= List of chairmen of the Verkhovna Rada =

This article lists the chairmen of the Supreme Soviet (Verkhovna Rada in Ukrainian) of Ukrainian SSR (1938–1991) and the chairmen of the Verkhovna Rada of Ukraine (since 1991).

== List of chairmen ==
=== Chairmen of the Supreme Soviet of the Ukrainian SSR ===
| No. | Portrait | Name | Term of office | | Party | Election | First Deputy | Deputy |
|---|---|---|---|---|---|---|---|---|
| 1 | | Mykhailo Burmystenko (1902–1941) | 25 July 1938 | 9 September 1941 | Communist (Bolsheviks) | 1938 | | |
| 2 | | Oleksandr Korniychuk (1905–1972) | 1947 | 1953 | Communist (Bolsheviks) | 1947 | | |
| 3 | | Pavlo Tychyna (1891–1967) | 1953 | 1959 | Communist | 1953 | | |
| 4 | | Oleksandr Korniychuk (1905–1972) | 1959 | 1972 | Communist | 1959 | | |
| 5 | | Mykhailo Bilyi (1922–2001) | 1972 | 1980 | Communist | 1972 | | |
| 6 | | Kostiantyn Sytnyk (1926–2017) | 1980 | 1985 | Communist | 1980 | | |
| 7 | | Platon Kostiuk (1924–2010) | 1985 | 15 May 1990 | Communist | 1985 | | |
| – (Note: temporarily heading) | | Ivan Plyushch (1941–2014) | 15 May 1990 | 4 June 1990 | Communist | 1990 | – | – |
| 8 | | Volodymyr Ivashko (1932–1994) | 4 June 1990 | 9 July 1990 | Communist | 1990 | Ivan Plyushch (Note: From July 9 to 23, Ivan Plyushch performed functions of Chairman ex officio as the First Deputy Chairman.) | Volodymyr Hrynyov |
| 9 | | Leonid Kravchuk (1934–2022) | 23 July 1990 | 24 August 1991 | Communist | 1990 | Ivan Plyushch | Volodymyr Hrynyov |

=== Chairmen of the Verkhovna Rada of Ukraine ===
According to the parliamentary regulations, a chair person of the Ukrainian parliament during his or her term at the position, officially votes in the parliament among the non-affiliated group.

| No. | Portrait | Name | Term of office | | Political alliance | Parliament (Election) | First Deputy | Deputy |
|---|---|---|---|---|---|---|---|---|
| 1 | | Leonid Kravchuk (1934–2022) | 24 August 1991 | 5 December 1991 | Independent (Note: Initially as an MP of the Communist Party of Ukraine which was dissolved after the 1991 August Putsch) | I (1990) | Ivan Plyushch | Volodymyr Hrynyov |
| 2 | | Ivan Plyushch (1941–2014) | 5 December 1991 | 11 May 1994 | Independent (Note: Initially as an MP of the Communist Party of Ukraine which was dissolved after the 1991 August Putsch) | I (1990) | Vasyl Durdynets | Volodymyr Hrynyov |
| 3 | | Oleksandr Moroz (born 1944) | 18 May 1994 | 7 July 1998 | Socialist Party of Ukraine | II (1994) | Oleksandr Tkachenko | Oleh Dyomin Viktor Musiyaka |
| 4 | | Oleksandr Tkachenko (1939–2024) | 7 July 1998 | 21 January 2000 | Communist Party of Ukraine | III (1998) | Adam Martyniuk | Viktor Medvedchuk |
| 5 | | Ivan Plyushch (1941–2014) | 1 February 2000 | 14 May 2002 | People's Democratic Party | III (1998) | Viktor Medvedchuk | Stepan Havrysh |
| 6 | | Volodymyr Lytvyn (born 1956) | 28 May 2002 | 6 July 2006 | For United Ukraine | IV (2002) | Hennadiy Vasyliev Adam Martyniuk | Oleksandr Zinchenko |
| 7 | | Oleksandr Moroz (born 1944) | 6 July 2006 | 4 December 2007 | Socialist Party of Ukraine | V (2006) | Adam Martyniuk | Mykola Tomenko |
| 8 | | Arseniy Yatsenyuk (born 1974) | 4 December 2007 | 12 November 2008 | Our Ukraine–People's Self-Defense Bloc | VI (2007) | Adam Martyniuk Oleksandr Lavrynovych (Note: From November 12 to December 9, 2008, Oleksandr Lavrynovych performed functions of Chairman ex officio as the First Deputy Chairman.) | Mykola Tomenko |
| 9 | | Volodymyr Lytvyn (born 1956) | 9 December 2008 | 12 December 2012 | People's Party (Lytvyn Bloc) | VI (2007) | Oleksandr Lavrynovych Adam Martyniuk | Mykola Tomenko |
| 10 | | Volodymyr Rybak (born 1946) | 13 December 2012 | 22 February 2014 | Party of Regions | VII (2012) | Ihor Kalietnik | Ruslan Koshulynskyi |
| 11 | | Oleksandr Turchynov (born 1964) | 22 February 2014 | 27 November 2014 | Batkivshchyna (Note: During his term as Chairman, Turchynov switched allegiance to People's Front, which was established on 10 September 2014. People's Front did not take part in the 2012 parliamentary election and it never had a political faction in parliament prior to the 2014 parliamentary election.) | VII (2012) | vacant | Ruslan Koshulynskyi |
| 12 | | Volodymyr Groysman (born 1978) | 27 November 2014 | 14 April 2016 | Petro Poroshenko Bloc "Solidarity" | VIII (2014) | Andriy Parubiy | Oksana Syroyid |
| 13 | | Andriy Parubiy (1971–2025) | 14 April 2016 | 29 August 2019 | People's Front | VIII (2014) | Iryna Herashchenko | Oksana Syroyid |
| 14 | | Dmytro Razumkov (born 1983) | 29 August 2019 | 7 October 2021 | Servant of the People | IX (2019) | Ruslan Stefanchuk | Olena Kondratiuk |
| 15 | | Ruslan Stefanchuk (born 1975) | 8 October 2021 | Incumbent | Servant of the People | IX (2019) | Oleksandr Kornienko | Olena Kondratiuk |

== See also ==
- Chairman of the Verkhovna Rada
- Presidium of the Verkhovna Rada
