= Ihor Kalietnik =

Ukrainian politician

- Ігор Калєтнік
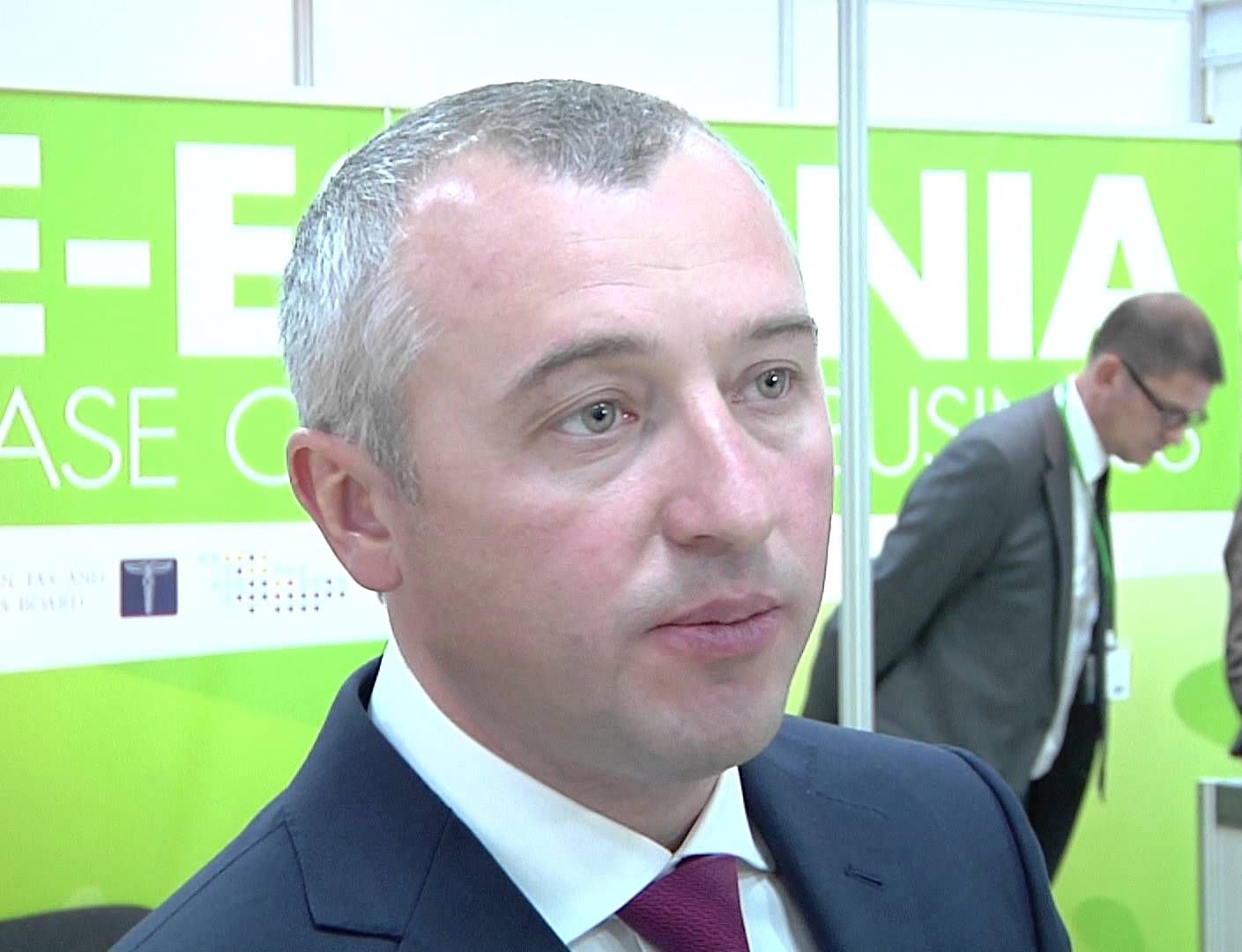
- Kalietnik in 2013

People's Deputy of Ukraine

6th convocation
- In office 23 November 2007 – 4 February 2011
- Constituency: Independent, No.16

7th convocation
- In office 12 December 2012 – 17 March 2014
- Constituency: Communist Party of Ukraine, No.7

Personal details
- Born: July 16, 1972 (age 53)

Ihor Hryhorovych Kalietnik (Ukrainian: Ігор Григорович Калєтнік; born 16 July 1972) is a Ukrainian politician, who was First Deputy Chairman of the Verkhovna Rada.

== Biography ==
Born in 1972 in village of Klembivka, Yampil Raion, Vinnytsia Oblast, Kalietnik graduated the Vinnytsia Agrarian University in 1993 as agronomist. From 1995 to 2005 he worked for the Ukrainian customs across the country. In 2001, Kalietnik graduated the law school of Kyiv University and in 2004 the Odesa Law Academy to receive title of the Candidate of Judicial Sciences.

For short period he worked as a judge of the Dnipro district court of Kyiv from 2005 to 2006. In spring of 2006 Kalietnik unsuccessfully ran for the Ukrainian parliament at the 2006 Ukrainian parliamentary election as an independent member of the People's Opposition Bloc of Natalia Vitrenko. In November 2007, he ran again at the 2007 Ukrainian parliamentary election as an independent member on a party list of the Communist Party of Ukraine finally becoming the People's Deputy of Ukraine. On 22 March 2010, Kalietnik was appointed the Head of Customs Service of Ukraine, yet his membership in parliament did not finish until 4 February 2011.

On 22 November 2012, he resigned as the head of Customs Service and again was reelected on party list to the Ukrainian parliament at the 2012 Ukrainian parliamentary election now as a member of the Communist Party of Ukraine. In 2012-2014 Kalietnik served as the first deputy chairman of the Verkhovna Rada. After the events of Euromaidan he resigned as the first deputy chairman and in June 2014 left the ranks of Communist Party of Ukraine.

In autumn 2014, Kalietnik ran again for the Ukrainian parliament at the 2014 Ukrainian parliamentary election as an independent candidate at the 41st electoral district in Donetsk (Budyonivsky and Petrivsky districts), Donetsk Oblast, however the election failed to take place in the electoral district due to the War in Donbas.

== See also ==
- Hryhoriy Kalietnik, Ihor's father, MP of the Party of Regions (2012–2014)
- Oksana Kalietnik, Ihor's cousin, MP of the Communist Party of Ukraine (2012–2014)
