= Park Zhovtnevyi =

Park in Chernivtsi, Ukraine

- Ukrainian: Парк «Жовтневий»
- IUCN category III (natural monument or feature)
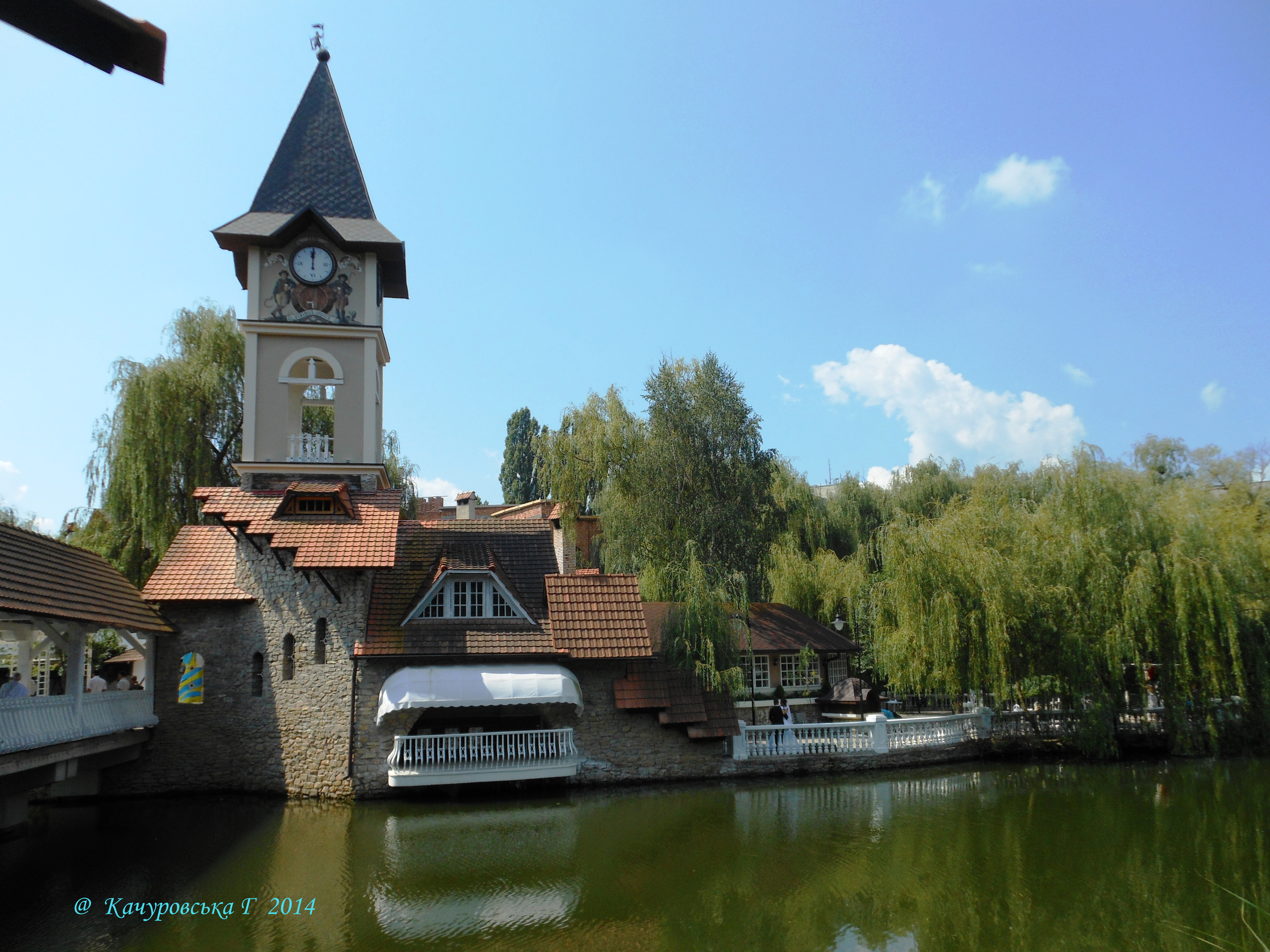
- Park Zhovtnevyi

- Location within Ukraine
- Location: Ukraine
- Nearest city: Chernivtsi
- Coordinates: 48.258°N 25.941°E
- Area: 70 hectares (0.27 mi^{2})
- Established: 1968

Park Zhovtnevyi (Ukrainian: Парк «Жовтневий») is a park-monument of garden design, located in the southern part of Chernivtsi, Ukraine. The park was founded in 1968.

== Topography ==
The park has an area of about 70 hectares (170 acres), making it the largest urban park in the city. Its territory includes walking trails, two artificial lakes, playgrounds and fields, and a skate park. An amusement complex located in the park was largely dismantled in 2024.

== History ==
The park was originally named Zhovtnevyi (lit. October), after the October Revolution. As a result of decommunization efforts, in January 2017, the park was renamed to Reformaciyi, after the Protestant Reformation. In March 2017 the decision was annulled by the court, with the park retaining its original name.

== Gallery ==
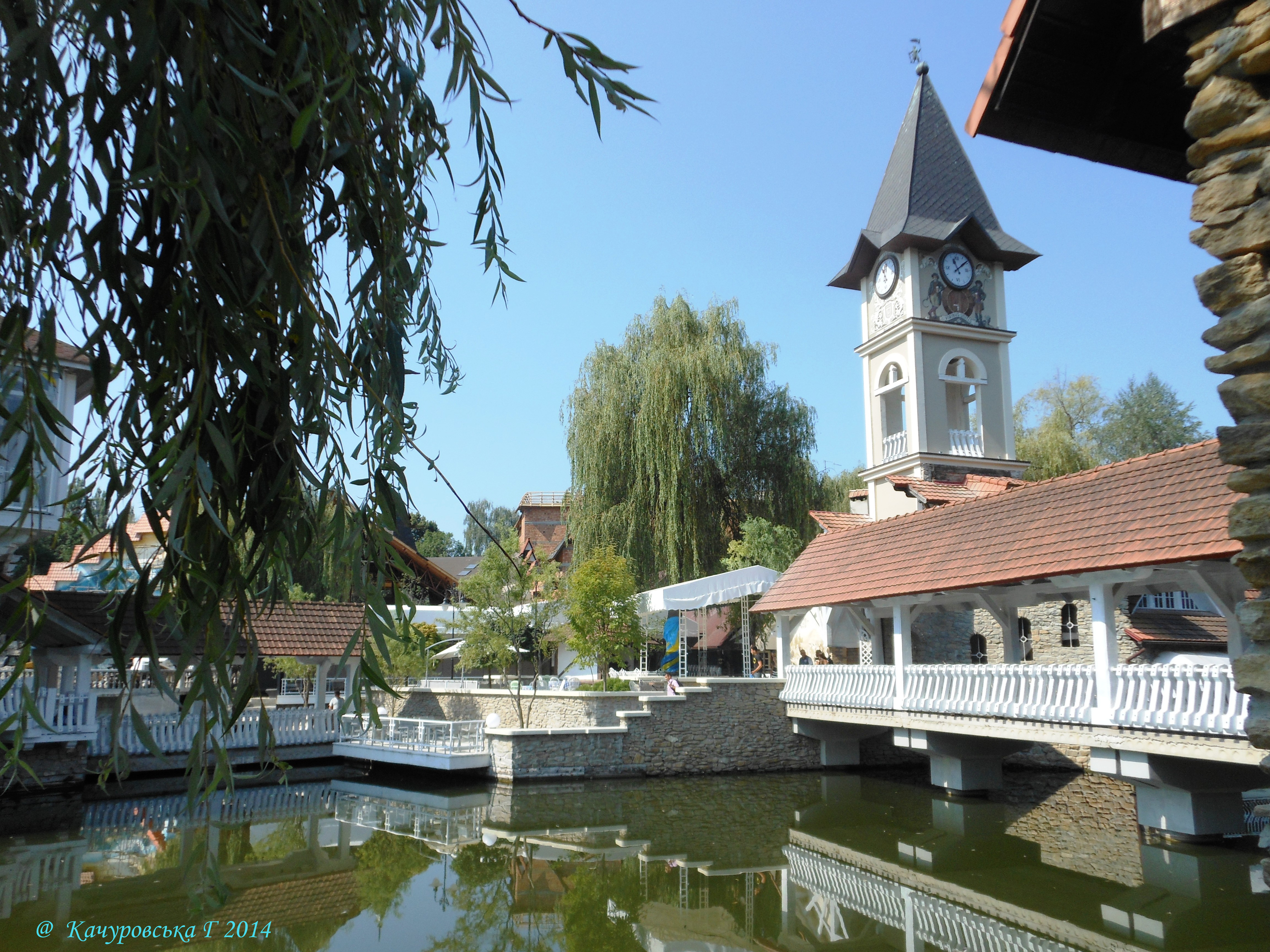

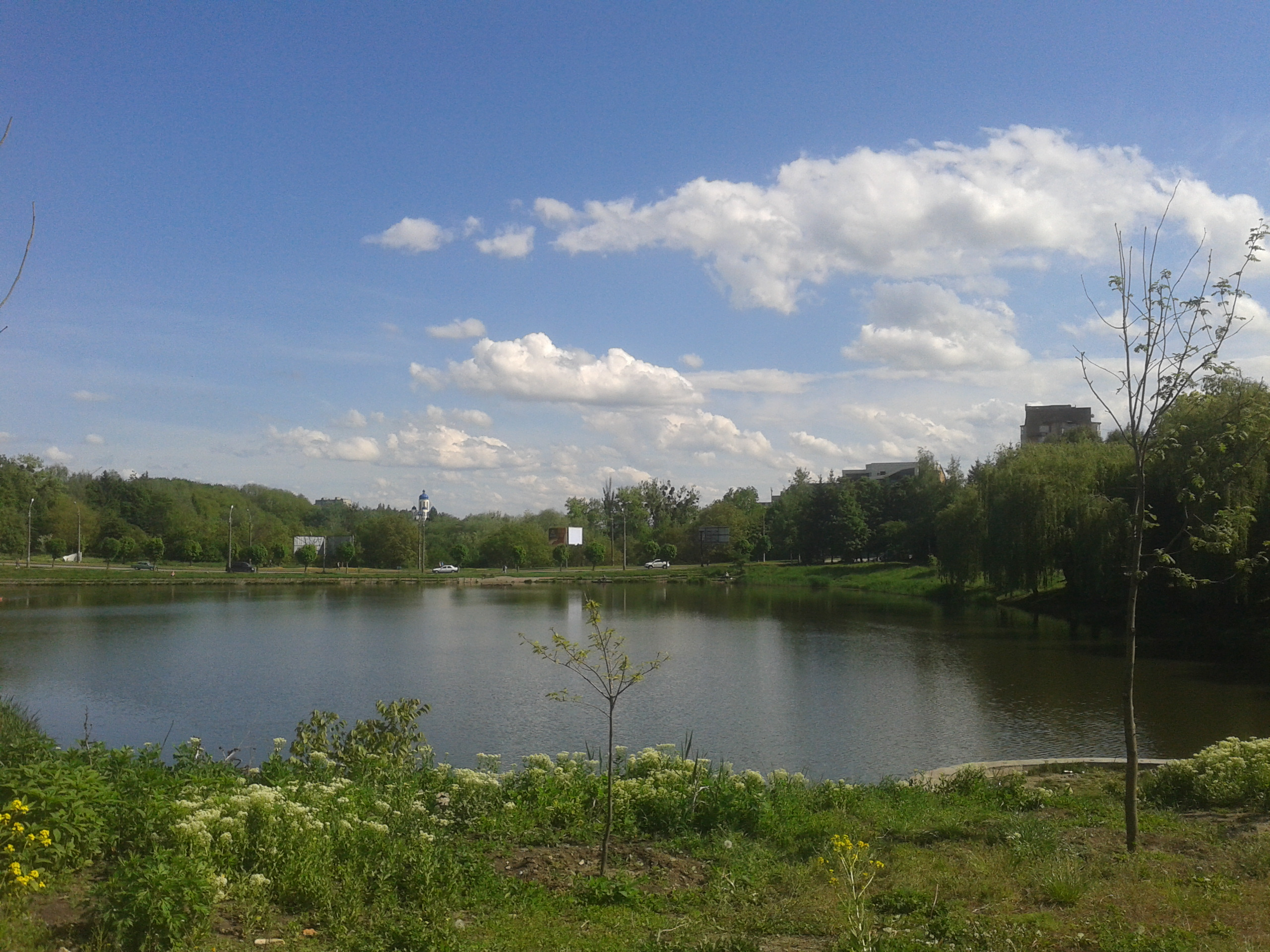

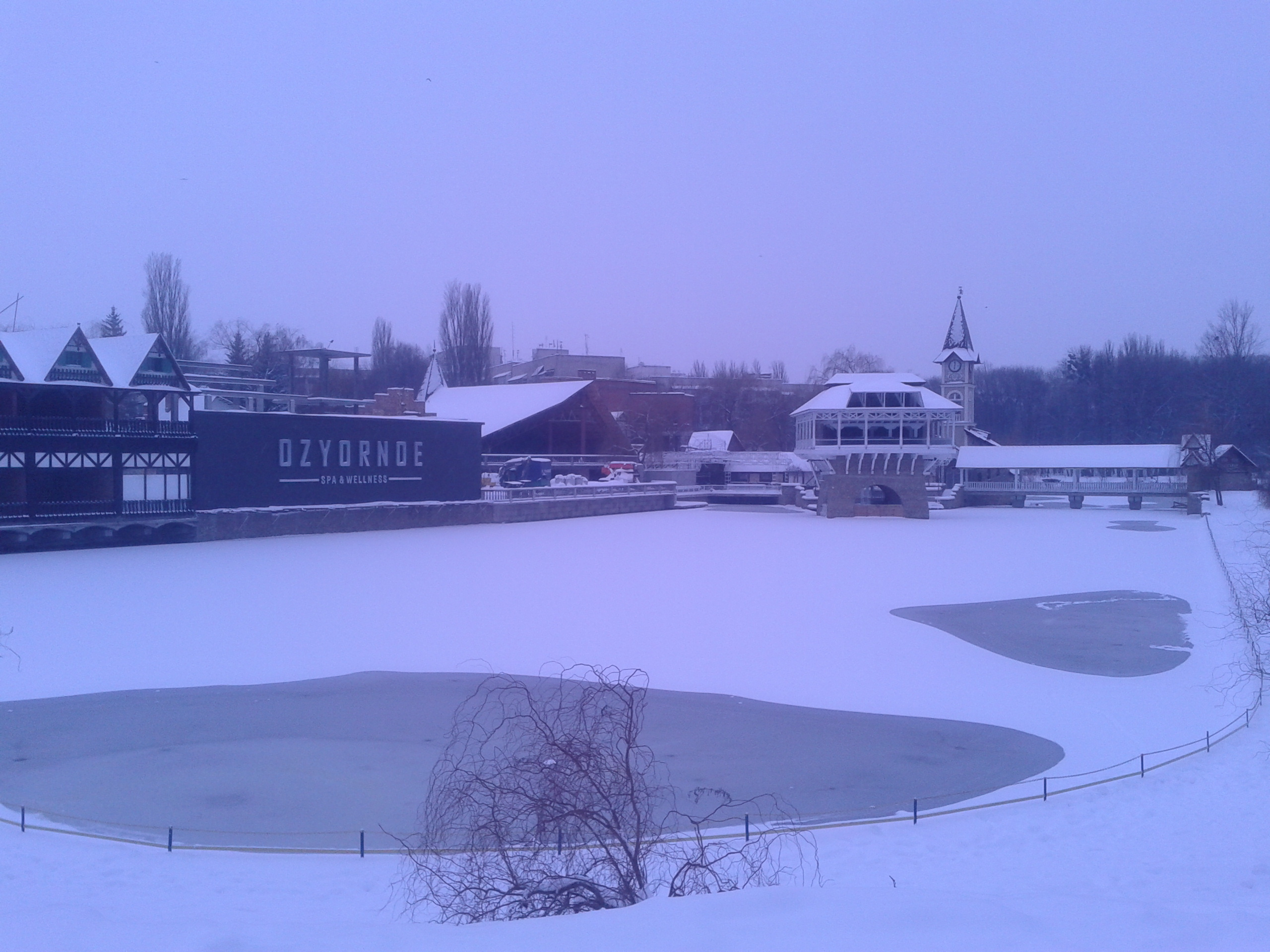

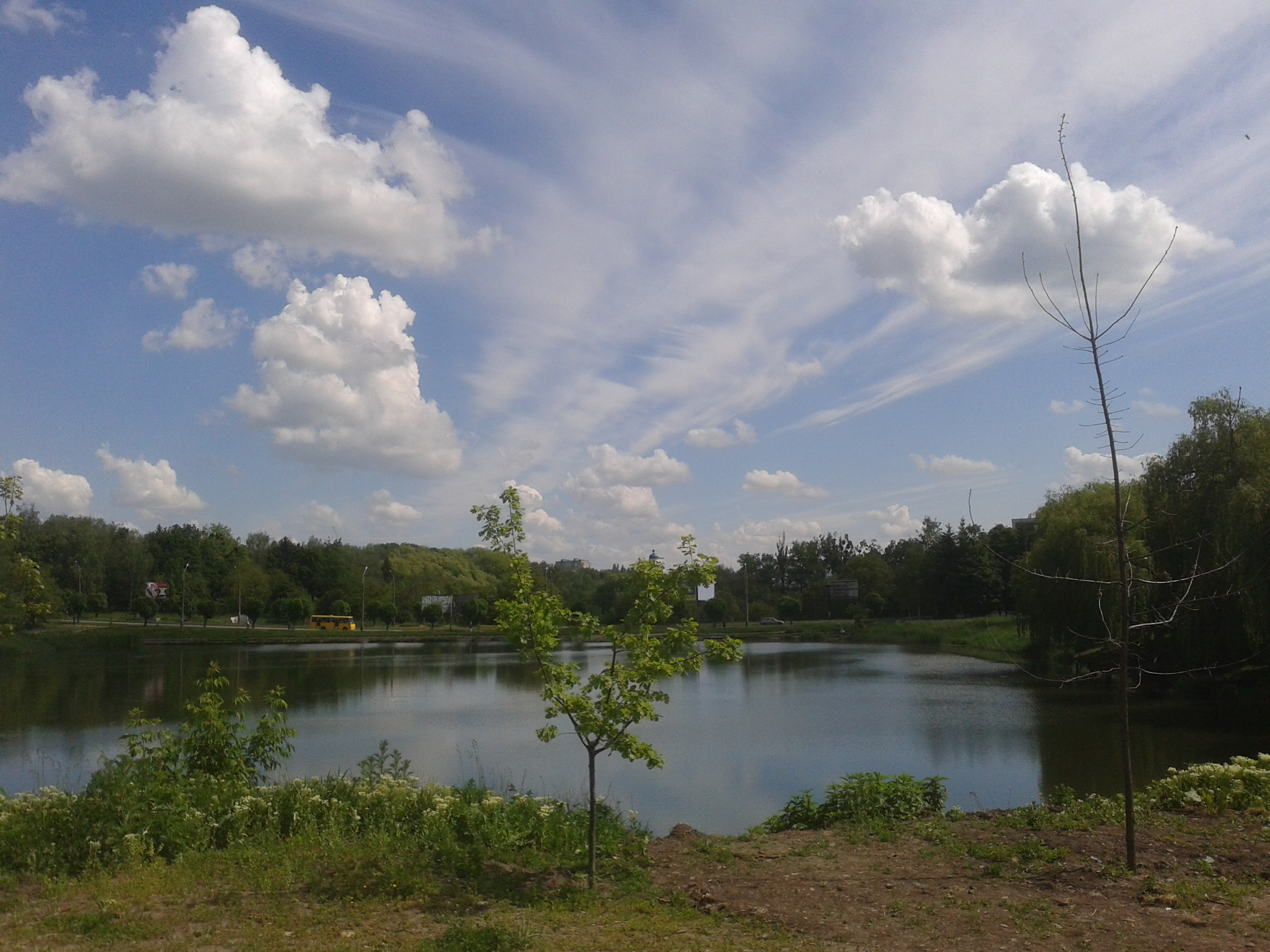

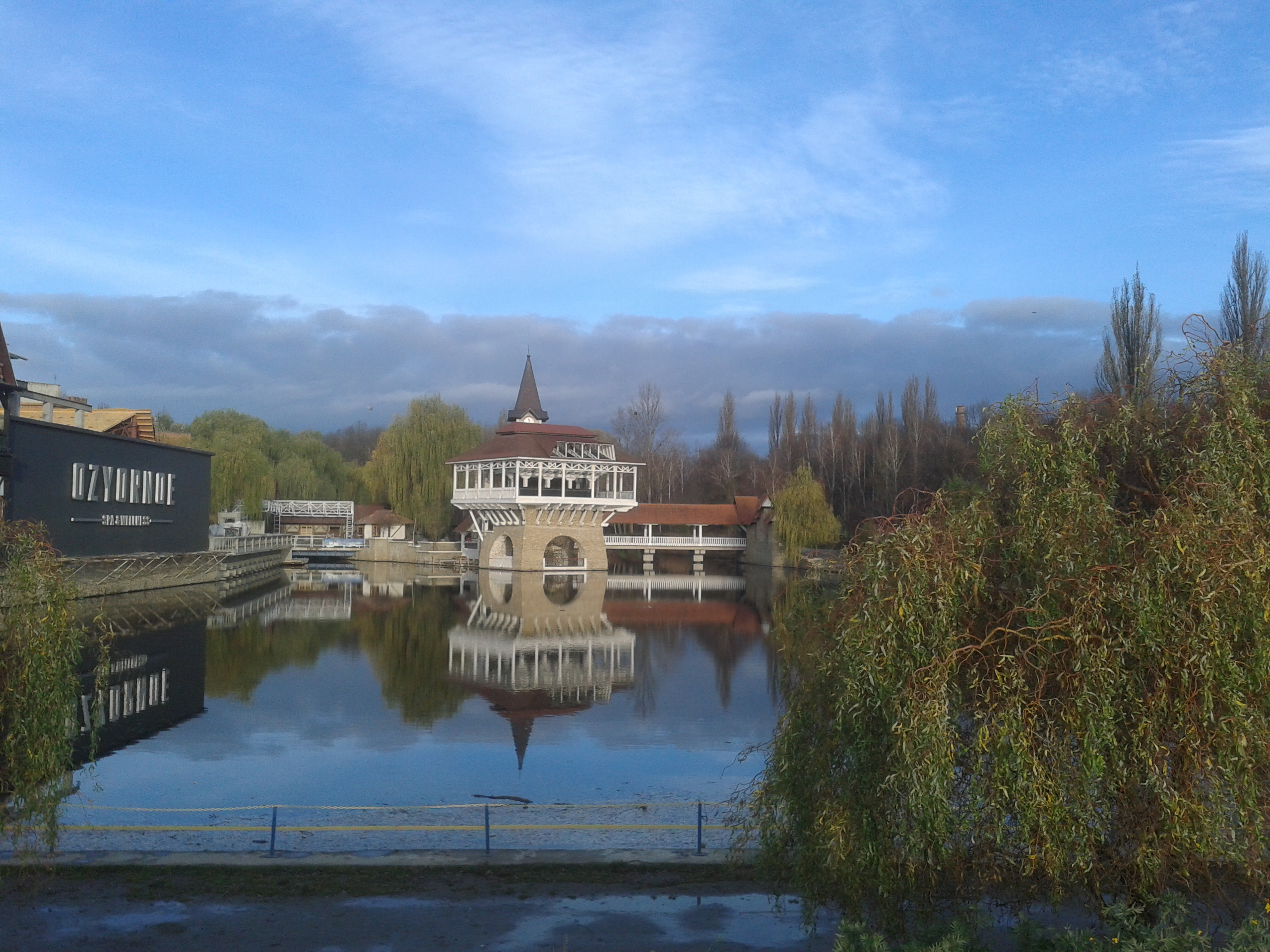
