= Ivan Plyushch =

Ukrainian politician (1941–2014)

Hero of Ukraine Ivan Plyushch
- Іван Плющ
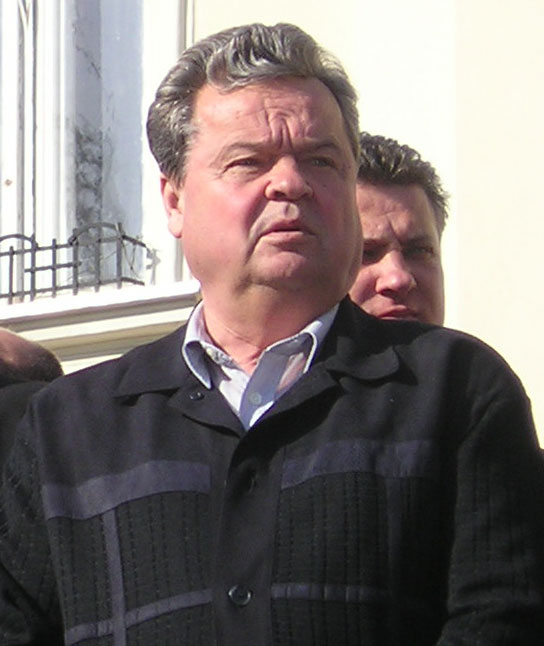
- Plyushch in 2004

Secretary of the Security and Defense Council
- In office 12 May 2007 – 26 November 2007
- President: Viktor Yushchenko
- Preceded by: Vitaliy Haiduk
- Succeeded by: Raisa Bohatyriova

Chairman of the Verkhovna Rada
- In office 1 February 2000 – 14 May 2002
- President: Leonid Kuchma
- Preceded by: Oleksandr Tkachenko
- Succeeded by: Volodymyr Lytvyn
- In office 5 December 1991 – 11 May 1994
- President: Leonid Kravchuk
- Preceded by: Leonid Kravchuk
- Succeeded by: Oleksandr Moroz
- In office Acting: 9 July – 23 July 1990
- Preceded by: Vladimir Ivashko
- Succeeded by: Leonid Kravchuk

First Deputy Chairman of the Verkhovna Rada
- In office 6 June 1990 – 5 December 1991
- Speaker: Leonid Kravchuk
- Succeeded by: Vasyl Durdynets
- In office 1985–1990
- Speaker: Volodymyr Ivashko

Chairman of the Kyiv Oblast Council
- In office 3 April – 24 July 1990
- Succeeded by: Vasyl Sinko

Chairman of the Kyiv Regional executive committee
- In office 25 December 1984 – 3 April 1990
- Preceded by: Vasyl Sinko
- Succeeded by: Vasyl Sinko

People's Deputy of Ukraine
- In office 23 November 2007 – 12 December 2012
- Constituency: Our Ukraine–People's Self-Defense Bloc, No. 23
- In office 15 May 1990 – 25 May 2006
- Constituency: Kyiv Oblast, No. 221; Chernihiv Oblast, No. 445; People's Democratic Party, No. 3; Chernihiv Oblast, No. 209

Personal details
- Born: 11 September 1941 Borzna, Chernihiv Oblast, Ukrainian SSR, Soviet Union
- Died: 25 June 2014 (aged 72) Kyiv, Ukraine
- Party: Communist Party of the Soviet Union; People's Democratic Party; Our Ukraine
- Education: National University of Life and Environmental Sciences of Ukraine
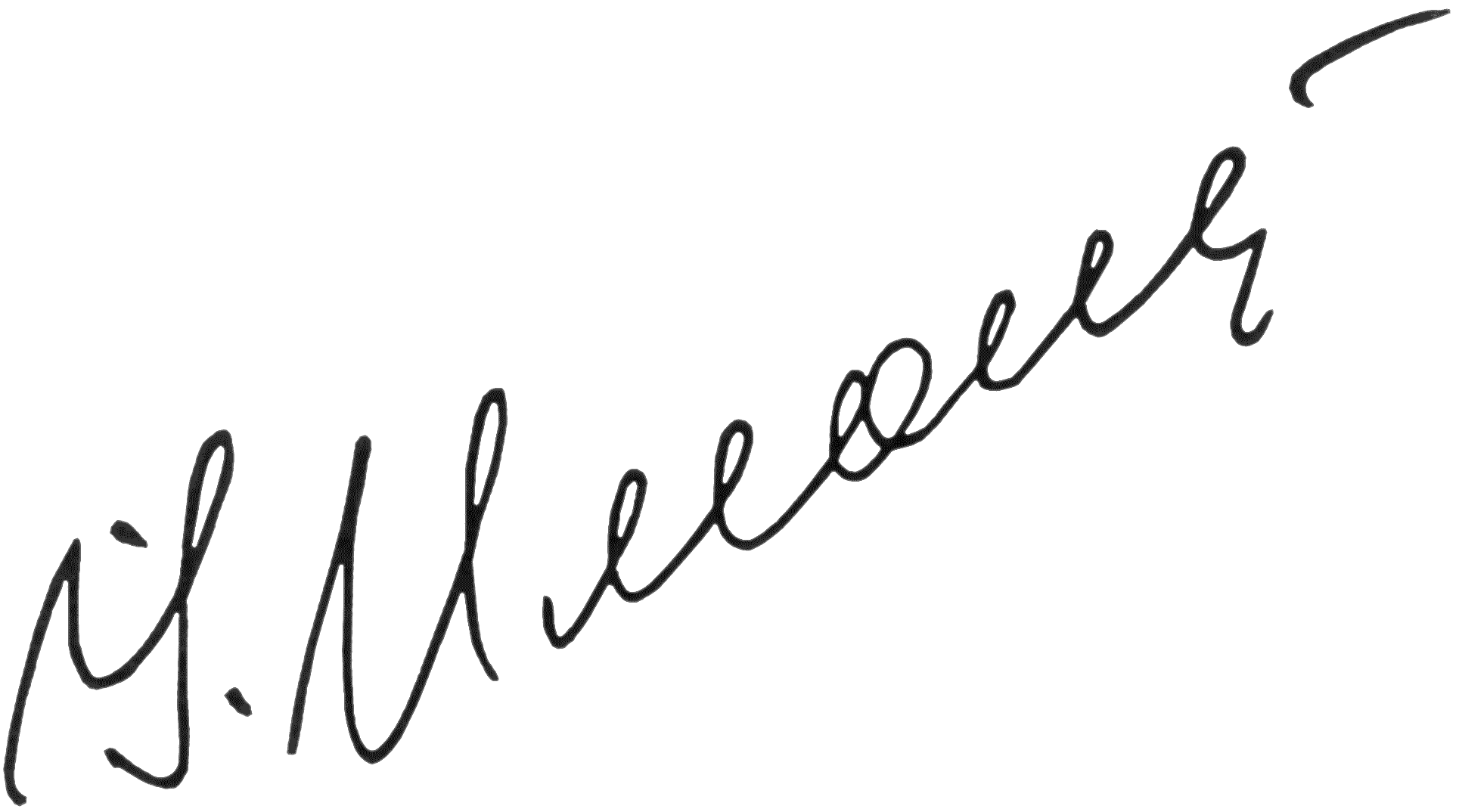
- Signature

Ivan Stepanovych Plyushch (Ukrainian: Іван Степанович Плющ; 11 September 1941 – 25 June 2014) was a Ukrainian politician. He thrice served as the Chairman of the Verkhovna Rada (parliament of Ukraine), from 9 July to 23 July 1990 (acting), from 5 December 1991 to 11 May 1994, and from 1 February 2000 to 14 May 2002.

== Biography ==
Ivan Plyushch was born on 11 September 1941, in Borzna in Chernihiv Oblast. After graduation in 1959 from Borzna Agricultural College he started his professional career as a mid-level worker, an agronomist, and the head of a division in a few state farms (Ukrainian: radhosp) and collective farms (Ukrainian: kolhosp) in Baryshivka Raion. Between 1967 and 1974 Plyushch was the head of Kirov collective farm and the head of Lenin state farm in Baryshivka Raion. Between 1975 and 1977 he was in Kyiv working as a vice-deputy of a Kyiv Oblast regional committee of the Communist Party of Ukraine. Between 1977 and 1979 Plyushch studied in Moscow at the Central Committee of the Communist Party Academy of Social Science. After his studies he continued working in Kyiv in the divisions of the Communist Party of Kyiv Oblast. In 1984 he became the vice-head, and later the head of Kyiv Oblast Administration. In 1990 he was elected the head of Kyiv Oblast Council.

In 1990, Plyushch was elected to the Verkhovna Rada, where he worked for four consecutive сonvocations. On three occasions he served as Chairman of the Supreme Council; 9 July to 23 July 1990 (acting), 5 December 1991 to 11 May 1994, and 1 February 2000, to 14 May 2002.

In 1994, Plyushch participated in the 1994 Ukrainian presidential election. He won 1.29% votes, and took the 6th place out of 7 candidates. Leonid Kuchma was elected as the President in the election.

In the 2006 Ukrainian parliamentary election, Plyushch was leading the Ukrainian National Bloc of Kostenko and Plyushch. The bloc won 1.87% of popular vote, short of the required 3% threshold, and obtained no seats in the parliament.

In May 2007, Plyushch was appointed secretary of the Ukrainian National Security and Defence Council by President Viktor Yushchenko. Plyushch interpreted the council's responsibilities to include economic, environmental and energy security as well as military matters. This made it a key instrument in the President's efforts to assert his authority over the government headed by Prime Minister Viktor Yanukovych.

In the 2007 Ukrainian parliamentary election, Plyushch was elected as a candidate of Yushchenko's Our Ukraine–People's Self-Defense Bloc. He opposed a coalition with the Yulia Tymoshenko Bloc and he was dismissed as Security and Defence Council Secretary by the President in November 2007, shortly before Yanukovych was replaced as prime minister by Yulia Tymoshenko.

Plyushch became a creating member of Reforms for the Future in February 2011.

In the 2012 Ukrainian parliamentary election Plyushch was not a candidate.

Plyushch died on 25 June 2014, at the age of 72 after a long battle with cancer.

== Awards ==
- Hero of Ukraine with the Order of the State (2001)
- The Order of Prince Yaroslav the Wise 5th (1996), 4th (2007) and 3rd (2011) Cl.
- Cross of Ivan Mazepa (2010)

Political offices
Preceded by Leonid Kravchuk	Chairman of the Verkhovna Rada; 1991–1994	Succeeded by Oleksandr Moroz
Preceded by Oleksandr Tkachenko	Chairman of the Verkhovna Rada; 2000–2002	Succeeded by Volodymyr Lytvyn
