= Communist Party of Workers and Peasants =

- Founded: 2001
- Banned: 30 September 2015
- Split from: Communist Party of Ukraine
- Ideology: Communism; Marxism–Leninism

The Communist Party of Workers and Peasants (Ukrainian: Комуністична партія робітників і селян, Komunistychna Partiya Robitnykiv i Selian, KPRS) was a political party in Ukraine, formed in 2001 following a split from the Communist Party of Ukraine (KPU). On 30 September 2015 the District Administrative Court in Kyiv banned the party.

== History ==
The first chairman of the party was Oleksandr Mykolayovych Yakovenko. In the 2002 Ukrainian parliamentary election, the party won 0.41% of the popular vote and no seats. Since then it has not taken part in any nationwide election. In 2011, the KPRS chairman Leonid Hrach was elected as the head of the party in February 2011; at the time he was member of the Ukrainian parliament. Hrach did not return to parliament after the 2012 Ukrainian parliamentary election after losing as an independent candidate in single-member districts number 1 (first-past-the-post wins a parliament seat) located in the Autonomous Republic of Crimea. His party did not participate in the election. The party was again absent in the 2014 Ukrainian parliamentary election.

In May 2015, decommunization in Ukraine came into effect in Ukraine, banning communist symbols, singing the Soviet national anthem or "The Internationale". Because of these laws, the Ministry of Justice stripped the party of its right to participate in elections on 24 July 2015. The party did not challenge this ban and was thus on 30 September 2015 terminated by the District Administrative Court in Kyiv.
