= Communist Party of Ukraine (renewed) =

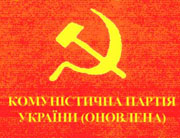
- Founded: November 2000
- Banned: 30 September 2015
- Split from: Communist Party of Ukraine
- Ideology: Communism; Marxism-Leninism
- Political position: Far-left

KPU(o) election poster

The Communist Party of Ukraine (renewed) (Ukrainian: Комуністична партія України (оновлена), romanized: Komunistychna Partiia Ukrainy (onovlena), KPU(o)) was a political party in Ukraine, formed in November 2000 following a split from the Communist Party of Ukraine (KPU). KPU(o) was led by Mykhaylo Savenko, previously a member of Parliament of the pro-president Kuchma Labour Ukraine. On 30 September 2015, the District Administrative Court in Kyiv banned the party.

== History ==
The party was formed in November 2000 as a split from the Communist Party of Ukraine (KPU). The first party leader was Mykhaylo Savenko. Savenko had been a Member of Parliament supporting President Leonid Kuchma in Labour Ukraine.

The KPU claimed that the formation of the KPU(o) was instigated by the political establishment to take votes from the KPU. In the 2002 Ukrainian parliamentary election, the party won 1.4% of the popular vote and no seats although only six other parties had spent more on their election campaign. In the 2007 Ukrainian parliamentary election, the party garnered only 0.29% of the popular vote. The party did not participate to the 2012 Ukrainian parliamentary election and the 2014 Ukrainian parliamentary election.

In May 2015, decommunization in Ukraine came into effect in Ukraine, banning communist symbols, singing the Soviet national anthem or "The Internationale". Because of these laws, the Ukrainian Interior Ministry stripped the party of its right to participate in elections on 24 July 2015. The party did not challenge this ban and was thus on 30 September 2015 terminated by the District Administrative Court in Kyiv.
