= Oksana Kalietnik =

Ukrainian businesswoman and politician

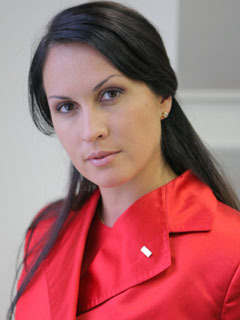

People's Deputy of Ukraine

7th convocation
- In office 12 December 2012 – 27 November 2014

Personal details
- Born: 10 December 1972 (age 53) Khmilnyk, Ukrainian SSR, Soviet Union
- Party: Communist Party of Ukraine (2012–14)
- Education: Taras Shevchenko National University of Kyiv

Oksana Mykolayivna Kalietnik (Ukrainian: Оксана Миколаївна Калетник; born 10 December 1972) is a Ukrainian businesswoman and politician who served as a People's Deputy of Ukraine in the seventh convocation.

== Early life and education ==
Kalietnik was born on 10 December 1972 in Khmilnyk to forestry worker Mykola Kalietnik (b. 1943) and Russian literature teacher Halyna Loseva (b. 1947). The family moved to Kyiv, where Kalietnik herself graduated from high school No. 183 (1989) and joined the Komsomol.

Her father Mykola Kalietnik headed the department of the Ukrainian Ministry of Forestry in the 1990s. Years later, Oksana noted that she was proud of her father, "because he is just from the series of 'hardened communists,' in a good sense". Her father's brother and uncle, is a Ukrainian politician, people's deputy of several convocations G. N. Kaletnik, whose son, also a Ukrainian politician and people's deputy Igor Kaletnik, is her cousin.

Kalietnik received two degrees at the Taras Shevchenko National University of Kyiv, where in 1990-1995 she studied at the Faculty of General Psychology and Sociology as a psychologist, and at the same time in 1992–1996 she studied at the Faculty of Law as a lawyer. Subsequently, speculation appeared in the media that her law degree was fake, but Kalietnik denied this.

== Business career ==
As a student in 1991, Kalietnik began working as an advertising manager (headed the advertising department) at the phytodesign company "Roksolana" (a legal foreign trade association). She recalled: "I ended up in Roksolana by accident. Walking along Andriivskyi Descent, I saw a beautiful display case with flowers, looked around, liked it, went in and asked for the director. And then I told him that I can do this, this and this, and I want to work for them. He was taken aback by such insolence, but took the job. This was my first and last hired job. And we had to do a lot, even despite the position of manager: we packed the flowers ourselves, and collected the bouquets, and agreed on delivery."

From 1992 to 1995, Kalietnik was president and co-founder of the advertising agency "Dali" (investments in television and media projects), and from 1994 to 1995, she was general director and co-founder of the production studio "Master Video" that grew out of "Dali", which was engaged in the creation of television programs for the TV channel Inter. At the same time, she invested in the Pyramid advertising agency and its team of Borys Lozhkin (Telenedelya project, all-Ukrainian weekly magazine). From 1995 to 1996, she worked at the law firm Alkom Kyiv in which she co-founded. From 1996 to 2003, she was vice president of the BM Group construction corporation, which belonged to her ex-husband, entrepreneur Dmytro Elmanov. At the same time, from 1999 to 2003, she headed the representative office of the Danish investment holding Dannmar Scandinavia Aps in Ukraine. In 2003, she became the founder and until 2010 the general director of the group of companies "FIM Consulting" (“Finance, Investments, Management Consulting”), which worked in the market of residential, commercial and industrial real estate, as well as the restaurant business, among its assets there were more than a dozen commercial and residential real estate located in Kyiv Oblast. Over time, FIM became the management company Dannmar Scandinavia Aps, implementing a broad investment program in Ukraine, Kalietnik was its certified specialist (2006-2009). Now she is the owner of FimGroup, which is engaged in trade, transportation, real estate and restaurant activities.

Kalietnik won the national program "Person of the Year - 2007" in the "Manager of the Year" nomination. From 29 June 2010 to October 2012, she was a member of the National Council for Television and Radio Broadcasting (under the parliamentary quota from the Communist Party of Ukraine). She noted that she left the business, which she transferred to management, being a shareholder.

In 2012, she declared almost 7 million hryvnia of income, 63 million hryvnia in her accounts, owns Land Rovers produced in 2008 and the BMW 85z produced in 2004. In 2013, Focus magazine estimated her fortune at $35 million; she took 190th place in the ranking of "200 richest people in Ukraine".

== Political career ==
In the 2012 parliamentary elections, Kalietnik was elected as a non-party self-nominated candidate in single-mandate majoritarian constituency No. 16 in the Vinnytsia Oblast, receiving 43.22% of the votes. Oleksiy Poroshenko (father of Petro Poroshenko), who was considered Kalietnik’s main competitor in the election race, withdrew his candidacy even before the elections. She became the richest woman in parliament. Having become a member of the Communist Party of Ukraine and joining its parliamentary faction, she became the only member of the faction elected from a majoritarian constituency. She was Deputy Head of the Budget Committee of the Verkhovna Rada of Ukraine.

On 8 April 2014, Kalietnik took part in repelling an attack by representatives of the VO “Svoboda” on the leader of the Communist Party of Ukraine Petro Symonenko, who was speaking from the rostrum of parliament, exerting physical pressure on the Svoboda deputy Yuriy Mykhalchyshyn who attacked him. In May 2014, she left the Communist Party.

== Personal life ==
Kalietnik lives in a country house in the Kyiv neighborhood of Koncha-Zaspa. Divorced, she has a daughter, Olha (b. 1993), who studies in London. She is a believer, regularly reads the Bible and prays. She is also interested in “Vedic” philosophy and reads Rami Blekt.
