= Adam Martyniuk =

Ukrainian politician

- Адам Мартинюк
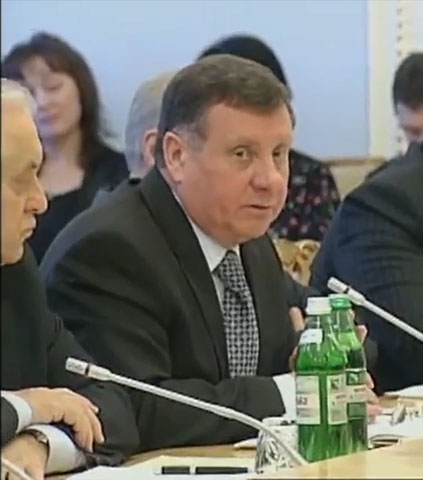
- Martyniuk in 2012

People's Deputy of Ukraine

3rd convocation
- In office May 12, 1998 – May 14, 2002
- Constituency: Communist Party of Ukraine, No.6

4th convocation
- In office May 14, 2002 – May 25, 2006
- Constituency: Communist Party of UkraineNo.6

5th convocation
- In office May 25, 2006 – November 23, 2007
- Constituency: Communist Party of Ukraine, No.2

6th convocation
- In office November 23, 2007 – December 12, 2012
- Constituency: Communist Party of Ukraine, No.6

7th convocation
- In office December 12, 2012 – November 27, 2014
- Constituency: Communist Party of Ukraine, No.8

Personal details
- Born: August 16, 1950 (age 75) Vetly, Volyn Oblast, Ukrainian SSR, Soviet Union

Adam Ivanovych Martyniuk (Ukrainian: Ада́м Іва́нович Мартиню́к; 16 August 1950) is a Ukrainian politician, one of leaders of the Communist Party of Ukraine who on several occasions served as the first vice-speaker of the Ukrainian parliament.

== Biography ==
Martyniuk was born in 1950 in a village of Vetly (Zarohizne khutir), Lyubeshiv Raion near the border with Belarus.

In 1972 he graduated the Lutsk State Pedagogical Institute as a teacher of history and social studies and after that worked as a history teacher in school of Velyka Hlusha, Lyubeshiv Raion. In 1972-76 Martyniuk attended aspirantura of the Institute of Social Studies (today – Krypiakevych Institute of Ukrainian Studies, National Academy of Sciences of Ukraine) receiving science degree Candidate of Sciences in history. During that period in 1974-75 he also served in the Soviet Army.

In 1976-81 Martyniuk worked as a scientist for the Institute of Social Sciences. In 1981-88 he worked for the Lviv regional committee of CPU, particularly as a lecturer at the House of Political Science. In 1988-91 Martyniuk held leading positions of the Communist Party in the city of Lviv and was an instructor of ideological department of the Communist Party of Ukraine.

With fall of the Soviet Union, in 1991-93 Martyniuk joined the Socialist Party of Ukraine. During that time he was a security guard in Kyiv for the agrarian company "Ukrayina" and from 1992 the chief editor of newspaper "Tovarishch". With the revival of the Communist Party of Ukraine in 1993, he switched to it and was the chief editor of newspaper "Kommunist" (until 1997). In 1994 he lost in parliamentary elections placing fourth in his electoral district (Lviv Oblast).

In 1998 Martyniuk was finally elected to the Verkhovna Rada as sixth on the party list for the Communist Party of Ukraine. Initially a member of the Communist faction in the parliament, in 1998-2000 he was part of non-affiliated. At the end of 2000 Martyuniuk returned to the faction of Communist Party of Ukraine. Since that time he was elected to the Ukrainian parliament for the next four convocations and was member of Communist faction until 2014.

In 2004 Martyniuk's daughter, Nataliya Adamivna Martyniuk as passenger of government vehicle that was involved in a car accident in result of which died an Olympic runner-up and Ukrainian athlete Alexander Beresch.

For the 2006 elections Martyniuk was second on the party list and on several occasions he held the position of the first vice-speaker of the parliament. In 2007 Martyniuk headed a temporary special commission (TSC) to present changes to the Constitution of Ukraine. In 2012 with regulation infringements, he headed the session of parliament that voted for the law on languages in Ukraine. Martyniuk chaired several parliamentary committees such as on parliamentary regulations (2002–03) and national security and defense (2012–14).

In the October 2014 Ukrainian parliamentary election Martyniuk was second on the Communist party election list; but the party did not seats since it came 1.12% short to overcome the 5% election threshold.
