= Decommunization in Ukraine =

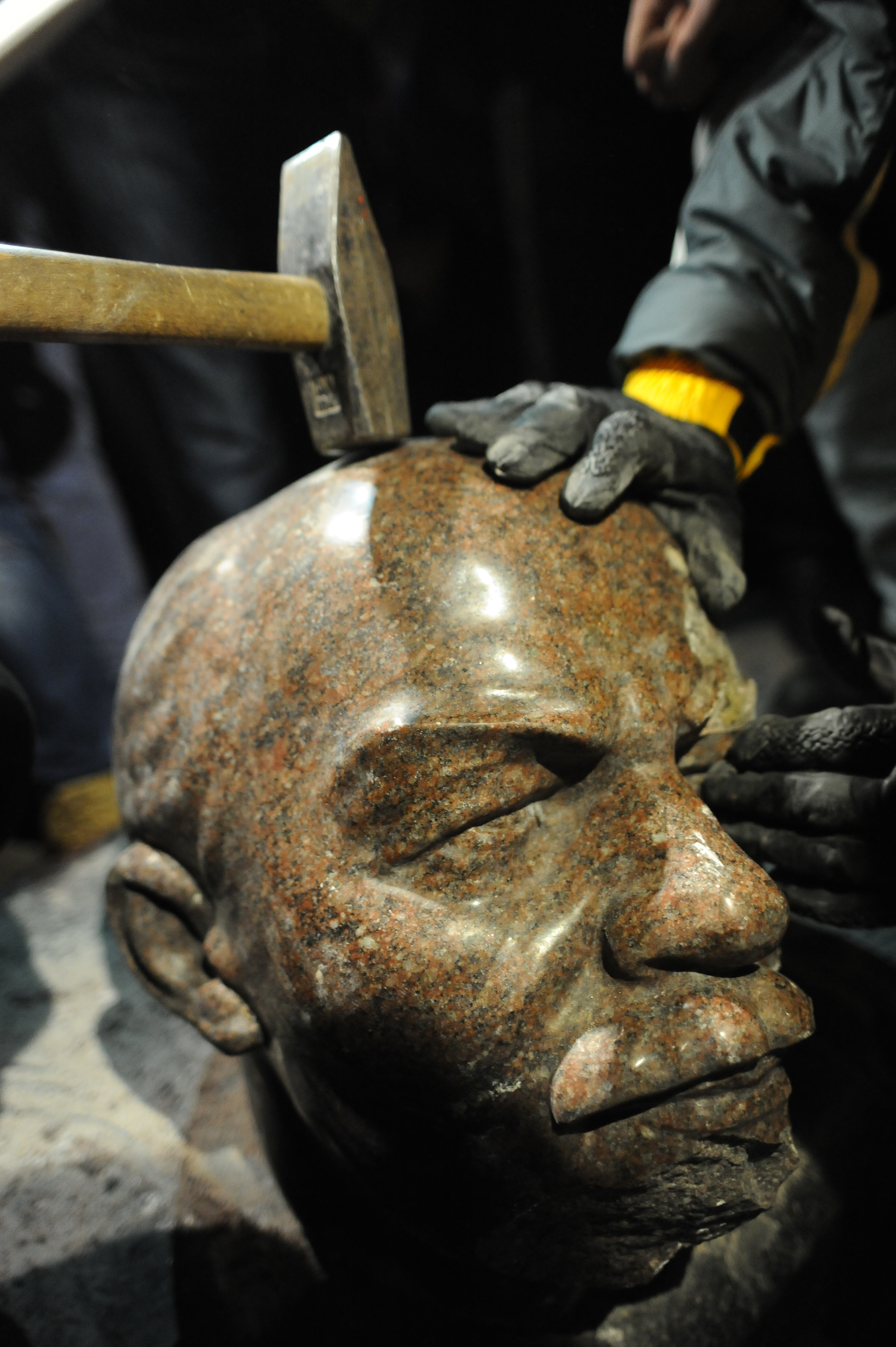
Destruction of the statue of Lenin in Kyiv during the 1 December 2013 Euromaidan protests

Decommunization in Ukraine started during the dissolution of the Soviet Union in 1991 and expanded afterwards. Following the 2014 Revolution of Dignity and beginning of the Russo-Ukrainian War, the Ukrainian government approved laws that banned communist symbols, as well as symbols of Nazism as both ideologies were deemed to be totalitarian.

On 15 May 2015, President Petro Poroshenko signed a set of laws that started a six-month period for the removal of Soviet communist monuments (excluding World War II monuments) and renaming of public places that had been named after Soviet communists. At the time, this meant that 22 cities and 44 villages were set to get new names. Until 21 November 2015, municipal governments had the authority to implement this; if they failed to do so, the oblasts had until 21 May 2016 to change the names. If the settlement still kept its old name, the Cabinet of Ministers of Ukraine could give a new name to the settlement. Violation of the law carries a penalty of a potential media ban and prison sentences of five to ten years.

In the early stages of the Russo-Ukrainian conflict, Oleksandr Turchynov alleged that the Communist Party of Ukraine had been helping pro-Russian separatists and Russian proxy forces in the country. In July 2015, the Ministry of the Interior stripped the Communist Party, the Communist Party of Ukraine (renewed), and the Communist Party of Workers and Peasants of their right to participate in elections and stated it was continuing court actions to end the registration of communist parties in Ukraine. By December 2015, these parties had been banned, for involvement in violating Ukraine's sovereignty and territorial integrity, inciting a violent overthrow of the state, and supporting Russian proxy forces. The Communist Party of Ukraine appealed the ban to the European Court of Human Rights.

By 2016, 51,493 streets and 987 cities and villages were renamed (with either the restoration of their historic names or new names), and 1,320 Lenin monuments and 1,069 monuments to other communist figures removed.

== History ==
=== Early unofficial reforms ===
An unofficial decommunization process started in Ukraine after the dissolution of the Soviet Union and the following independence of Ukraine in 1991. Decommunization was carried out much more ruthlessly and visibly in the former Soviet Union's Baltic states and Warsaw Pact countries outside the Soviet Union. Ukraine's first president after the country's 1991 independence from the Soviet Union, Leonid Kravchuk, had also issued orders aimed at "de-sovietisation" in the early 1990s.

In the following years, although at a slow rate, historical monuments to Soviet leaders were removed in Ukraine. This process went on much further in Western Ukraine than in Eastern Ukraine, which was more industrialised and largely Russian-speaking. Decommunization laws were proposed in the Ukrainian parliament in 2002, 2005, 2009, 2011, and 2013, but none of them were passed.

=== Post-Euromaidan reforms ===
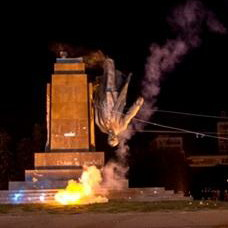
Pulling down the statue of Lenin in Kharkiv on 28 September 2014.

During and after Euromaidan, starting with the fall of the monument to Lenin in Kyiv on 8 December 2013, several Lenin monuments and statues were removed or destroyed by protesters.

In April 2014, a year before the formal, nationwide decommunization process in Ukraine, local authorities removed and altered communist symbols and place names, as in Dnipropetrovsk.

On 9 April 2015, the Ukrainian parliament passed legislation on decommunization. It was submitted by the Second Yatsenyuk Government, banning the promotion of symbols of "Communist and National Socialist totalitarian regimes". One of the main provisions of the bill was the recognition of the Soviet Union's regime as "criminal" and one that "pursued a state terror policy". The legislation prohibits the use of communist symbols and propaganda and also bans all symbols and propaganda of national-socialism and its values and any activities of Nazi or fascist groups in Ukraine. The ban applies to monuments, place and street names. The ban does not apply to World War II monuments and when symbols are located in a cemetery.

Expressing pro-communist views was not made illegal. The ban on communist symbols did result in the removal of hundreds of statues, the replacement of street signs and the renaming of populated places including some of Ukraine's biggest cities like Dnipro. The city administration of Dnipro estimated in June 2015 that 80 streets, embankments, squares, and boulevards would have to be renamed. Maxim Eristavi of Hromadske.TV estimated late April 2015 that the nationwide renaming would cost around $1.5 billion.

The legislation also granted special legal status to veterans of the "struggle for Ukrainian independence" from 1917 to 1991 (the lifespan of the Soviet Union). The same day, the parliament also passed a law that replaced the term "Great Patriotic War" in the national lexicon with "World War II" from 1939 to 1945 (instead of 1941–45 as is the case with the "Great Patriotic War"), a change of great significance.

On 15 May 2015, President of Ukraine Petro Poroshenko signed the Decommunisation Laws. This started a six-month period for the removal of communist monuments and renaming of public places named after communist-related themes.

Symbols of the Ukrainian Soviet Socialist Republic (flag and emblem).

The Ukrainian decommunization law applies, but is not limited to:

- the Flag of the Soviet Union
- the flags of the Ukrainian Soviet Socialist Republic and of the 14 other republics of the Soviet Union, as well as the flags of the socialist countries of Eastern Europe and abroad (Note: This ban does not include the national flags of the People's Republic of China, Cuba, Czech Republic, Hungary, Laos, Poland and Vietnam.)
- the State Emblem of the Soviet Union and its constituent republics as well as the socialist countries of Eastern Europe and abroad (Note: The ban is not extended to the national emblems of Belarus, Cuba, Laos, North Macedonia, Tajikistan and Uzbekistan.)
- the State Anthem of the Soviet Union and the republics (Note: This does not affect the Anthems of Russia, Belarus, Uzbekistan, Tajikistan and formerly, Kazakhstan and Turkmenistan. They all retained their Soviet-era melody with new lyrics written in its place.)
- the Red star
- the Hammer and sickle
- images bearing the likeness of Vladimir Lenin, Leon Trotsky, Joseph Stalin, Mao Zedong, Kim Il Sung, and Che Guevara
- Soviet military uniforms

The laws were published in Holos Ukrayiny on 20 May 2015; this made them come into force officially the next day.

On 3 June 2015, the Ukrainian Institute of National Memory published a list of 22 cities and 44 villages subject to renaming. By far most of these places were in the Donbas region in East Ukraine; the others were situated in Central Ukraine and South Ukraine. Under the Decommunisation Laws the municipal governments had until 21 November 2015 to change the name of the settlement they govern. For settlements that failed to rename, the provincial authorities had until 21 May 2016 to change the name. If after that date the settlement still retained its old name the Cabinet of Ministers of Ukraine renamed the settlement.

In a 24 July 2015 decree based on the decommunization laws, the Ukrainian Interior Ministry stripped the Communist Party of Ukraine, Communist Party of Ukraine (renewed) and Communist Party of Workers and Peasants of their right to participate in elections and it stated it was continuing the court actions (that started in July 2014) to end the registration of Ukraine's communist parties.

On 3 September 2015, the District Administrative Court in Kyiv banned the parties Communist Party of Workers and Peasants and Communist Party of Ukraine (renewed); they both did not appeal.

In October 2015, a statue of Lenin in Odesa was converted into a statue of Star Wars villain Darth Vader.

On 16 December 2015, the Kyiv District Administrative Court validated the claim of the Ministry of Justice in full, banning the activities of the Communist Party of Ukraine. The party appealed this ban at the European Court of Human Rights.

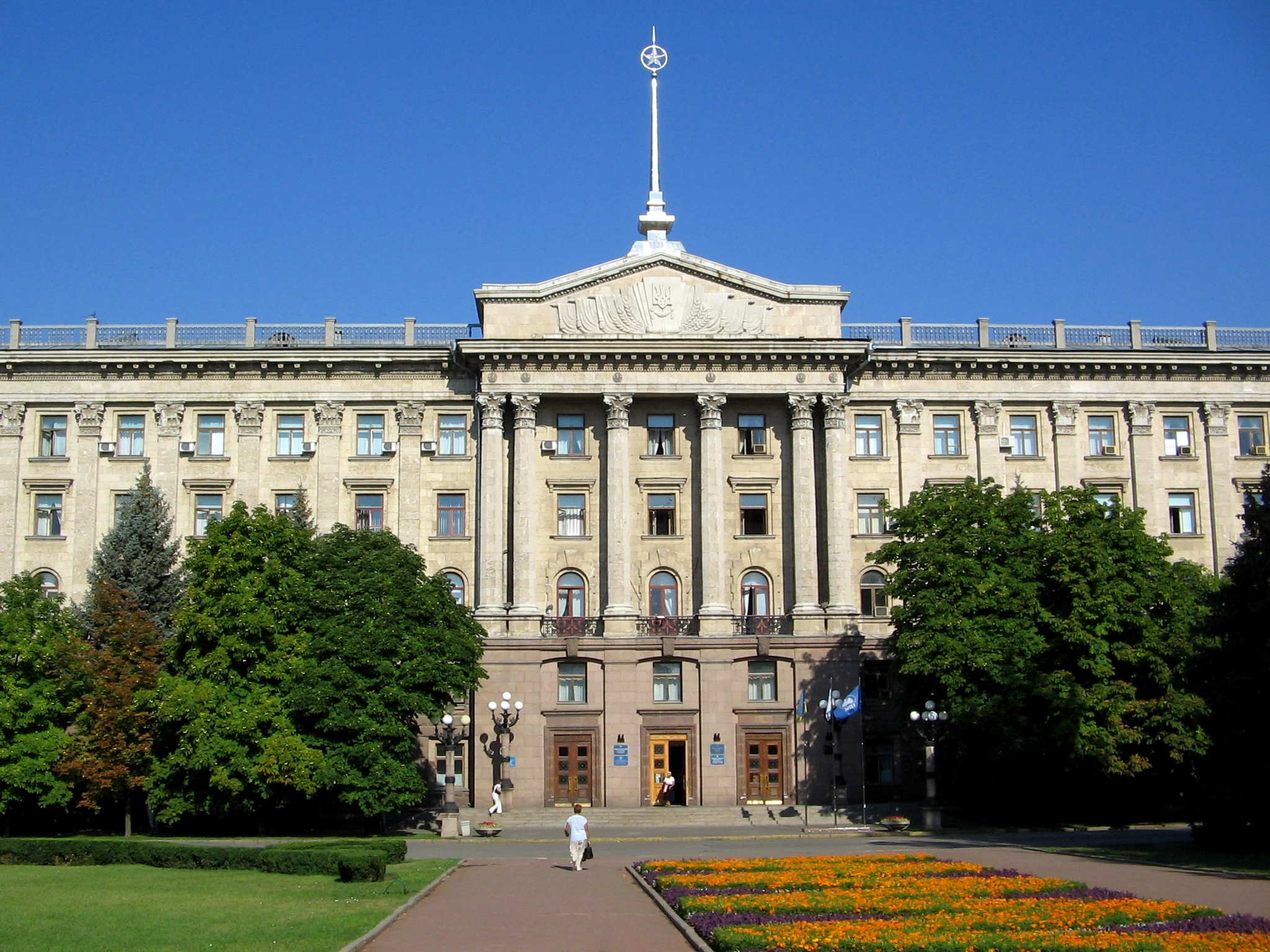
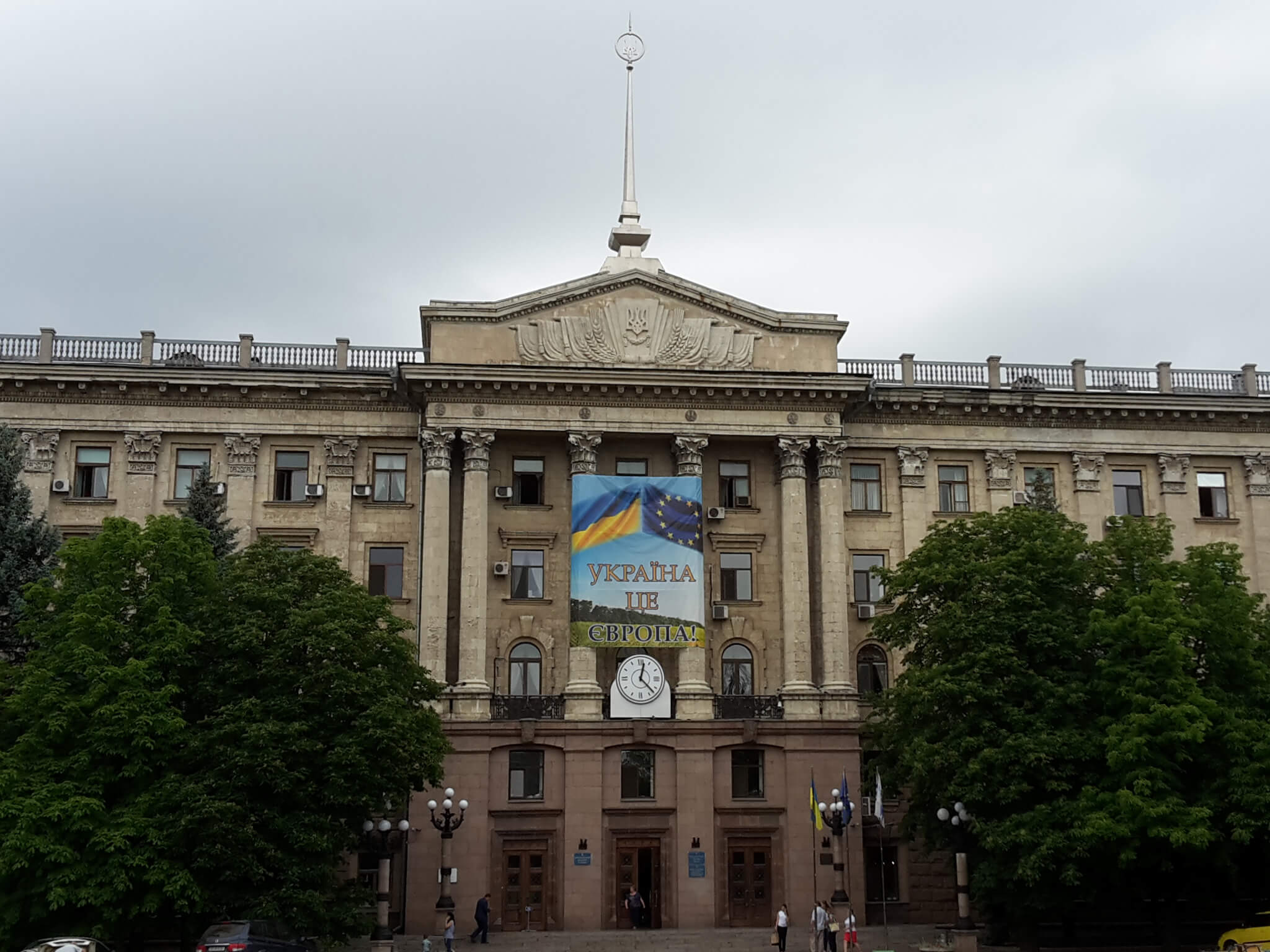
The City Hall of Mykolaiv in 2006 (left) and 2017 (right). The star, reminiscent of the Soviet era Red star still visible in the 2006 picture, was replaced in November 2016 by the coat of arms of Ukraine.

In March 2016, statues of Lenin, Felix Dzerzhinsky, Sergey Kirov and a Komsomol monument were removed or taken down in the eastern city of Zaporizhzhia. The statue overlooking the Dnieper Hydroelectric Station (formerly named Lenin Dam) was the largest remaining Lenin statue in Ukraine.

On 19 May 2016, the Ukrainian parliament voted to rename Ukraine's fourth-largest city Dnipropetrovsk to "Dnipro". The renaming of various locations was signed into the law on 20 May 2016.

The Ukrainian parliament declared in July 2016 that the new names of places in Crimea, (Note: Since the annexation of Crimea by the Russian Federation, the status of the Crimea and of the city of Sevastopol is under dispute between Russia and Ukraine; Ukraine and the majority of the international community considers the Crimea and Sevastopol an integral part of Ukraine, while Russia, on the other hand, considers the Crimea and Sevastopol an integral part of Russia, with Sevastopol functioning as a federal city within the Crimean Federal District.) under full Russian control since the 2014 Russian annexation of Crimea, "will enter force with the return of temporarily occupied territory of the Autonomous Republic of Crimea and Sevastopol under the general jurisdiction of Ukraine."

In May 2017, 46 Ukrainian MPs, mostly from the Opposition Bloc party, appealed to the Constitutional Court of Ukraine to declare the 2015 decommunization laws unconstitutional.

Director of the Ukrainian Institute of National Remembrance Volodymyr Viatrovych stated in February 2018 that "De-communism in the context of depriving the symbols of the totalitarian regime has actually been completed". Although according to him the city of Kyiv was lagging behind.

In February 2019, the Central Election Commission of Ukraine refused to register the candidacy of (leader of Communist Party) Petro Symonenko for the 2019 Ukrainian presidential election due to the fact that the statute, name and symbolism of the Communist Party of Ukraine did not comply with the 2015 decommunization laws. Symonenko appealed the decision, but the court of appeal confirmed decision of the Central Election Commission of Ukraine.

It was proposed that the oblast of Dnipropetrovsk would be renamed to "Sicheslav".

On 16 July 2019, the Constitutional Court of Ukraine upheld the 2015 Ukrainian decommunization laws.

On 7 November 2020 in the village Mala Rohan, an Emblem of the Ukrainian Soviet Socialist Republic was dismantled from the facade of a school.

=== Reforms following the Russian invasion of Ukraine ===
On 27 April 2022 (during the Russian invasion of Ukraine), the 27-foot (8 m) Soviet-era bronze statue under the People's Friendship Arch in Kyiv, representing Russian–Ukrainian friendship, was removed by order of Mayor of Kyiv Vitali Klitschko.

The Motherland Monument in Kyiv in 2002 with the Soviet emblem (left), and 2024 with the tryzub (right).

On 1 August 2023, the Soviet emblem was removed from the Motherland Monument (part of the National Museum of the History of Ukraine in the Second World War) in Kyiv. Its replacement, the Ukrainian Trident, was fully installed on 24 August 2023 (the Independence Day of Ukraine). The monument was also renamed to Mother-Ukraine.

On 24 October 2023 President Volodymyr Zelenskyy signed Law No. 8263 that abolished the concept of urban-type settlements in Ukraine. Law No. 8263 was meant to facilitate "de-Sovietization of the procedure for solving certain issues of the administrative and territorial system of Ukraine."

On 30 January 2024, the governor of Lviv Oblast said that the region was the first in Ukraine to remove all of its communist-era monuments.

== Criticism and reception ==
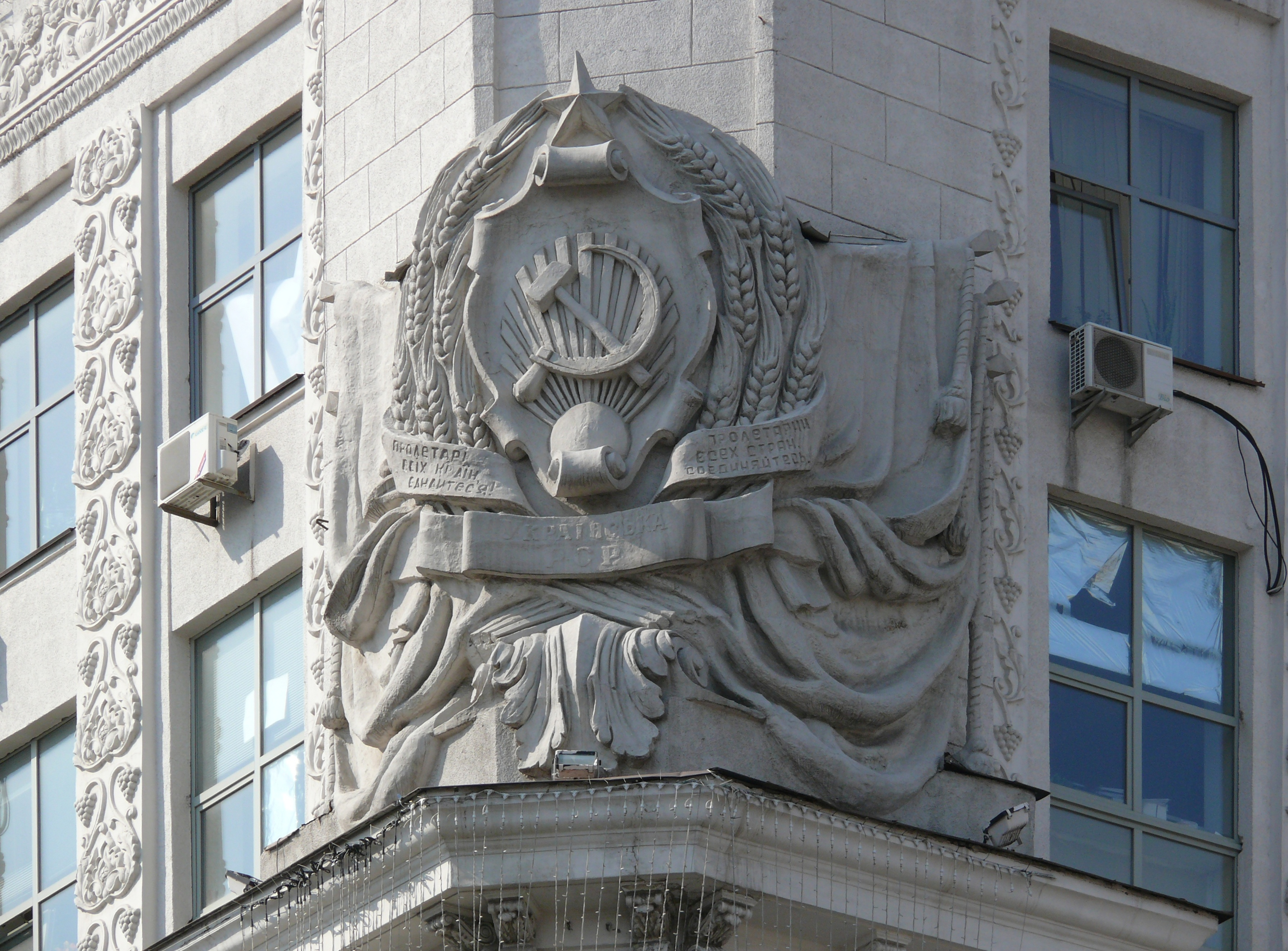
The Ukrainian SSR emblem seen in top of the city hall in Kharkiv.

On 18 May 2015, the OSCE expressed concern that the laws could negatively impact the freedom of the press in Ukraine. The OSCE also regretted what it perceived as a lack of opportunity of civil society to participate in public discussions about the laws.

The Kharkiv Human Rights Protection Group stated (in May 2015) the laws "(one of which) effectively criminalizes public expression of views held by many Ukrainians".

On 18 December 2015, the Venice Commission stated that Ukraine's decommunization laws did not comply with the laws of the Council of Europe. It was in particular critical about the banning of communist parties.

In April 2015, Russian lawmakers claimed that it was "cynical" to put communist and Nazi symbols on par with each other, and Russian-backed paramilitaries have condemned the law. The then leader and head of the self-proclaimed Donetsk People's Republic Alexander Zakharchenko stated in late February 2016 that when renamed cities "return under our jurisdiction", they would be renamed to their pre-decommunized name.

In his February 2022 Address concerning the events in Ukraine, Putin claimed that Ukraine's decommunization does not make any sense because "modern Ukraine was created by communist Russia, and specifically Lenin". Vitaly Chervonenko from the BBC noted how Putin's statement was a lie due to independent Ukrainian state formations of 1917–1920 and Kyiv's war with Lenin's Bolshevik government, whose purpose was to include Ukraine in Bolshevik Russia.

== Results ==
Former Soviet-era bas-reliefs at the Ukrainian House in Kyiv; removed in August 2016 (to comply with decommunization laws) and transferred to the Museum of Totalitarianism

Since 16 December 2015 three communist parties are banned in Ukraine (the Communist Party of Ukraine, Communist Party of Ukraine (renewed) and Communist Party of Workers and Peasants). The only party that appealed this ban was the Communist Party of Ukraine; this resulted in the court's decision to ban the Communist Party of Ukraine did not come into force. However, the April 2015 decommunization law contains a norm that allows the Ministry of Justice to prohibit the Communist Party from participating in elections.

Ukraine had 5,500 Lenin monuments in 1991, declining to 1,300 by December 2015. More than 700 Lenin monuments were removed and/or destroyed from February 2014 (when 376 came down) to November 2015. On 16 January 2017 the Ukrainian Institute of National Remembrance announced that 1,320 Lenin monuments were dismantled during decommunization.

On 16 January 2017, the Ukrainian Institute of National Remembrance stated that 51,493 streets, squares and "other facilities" had been renamed due to decommunization. By June 2016 there were renamed 19 raions, 27 urban districts, 29 cities, 48 urban-type settlements, 119 rural settlements and 711 villages. The fourth largest city was renamed from Dnipropetrovsk to Dnipro. In the second-largest city of Ukraine, Kharkiv, more than 200 streets, 5 administrative raions, 4 parks and 1 metro station had been renamed by early February 2016.

In all of 2016, 51,493 streets and 987 cities and villages were renamed, 25 raions were renamed and 1,320 Lenin monuments and 1,069 monuments to other communist figures removed. In some villages Lenin statues were remade into "non-communist historical figures" to save money. One of the most prominent examples was a Lenin monument in Odesa, which was remade into the monument to Darth Vader.

In February 2019, The Guardian reported that the two Lenin statues in the Chernobyl Exclusion Zone were the only two remaining statues of Lenin in Ukraine, if not taking into account occupied territories of Ukraine. In January 2021 "Radio Free Europe/Radio Liberty" located three remaining Lenin statues in three (Ukrainian controlled) small villages.

In January 2021, 24 Ukrainian streets were still named after former Russian cosmonaut and current United Russia member of the Russian State Duma Valentina Tereshkova (6 of them in parts of Ukraine occupied by Russia (Note: There were (also) Tereshkova streets in Lviv Oblast's Busk, Rivne Oblast's Radyvyliv and Sarny, Khmelnytskyi Oblast's Dunaivtsi and Cherkasy Oblast's Smila and in some other towns and villages.)), according to the 2015 decommunization laws they should have been renamed. They were renamed in 2022. The last Lenin statue in Ukraine (excluding territories currently annexed by Russia or occupied by separatists) was demolished in Stari Troyany, Izmail Raion, Odesa Oblast on 27 January 2021.

The director of the Ukrainian Institute of National Remembrance Volodymyr Viatrovych stated in February 2018 that the then-still existing Soviet hammer and sickle on the shield of the Motherland Monument in Kyiv should be removed to comply with the country's decommunization laws and replace it with the Ukrainian trident, which was subsequently done in 2023.

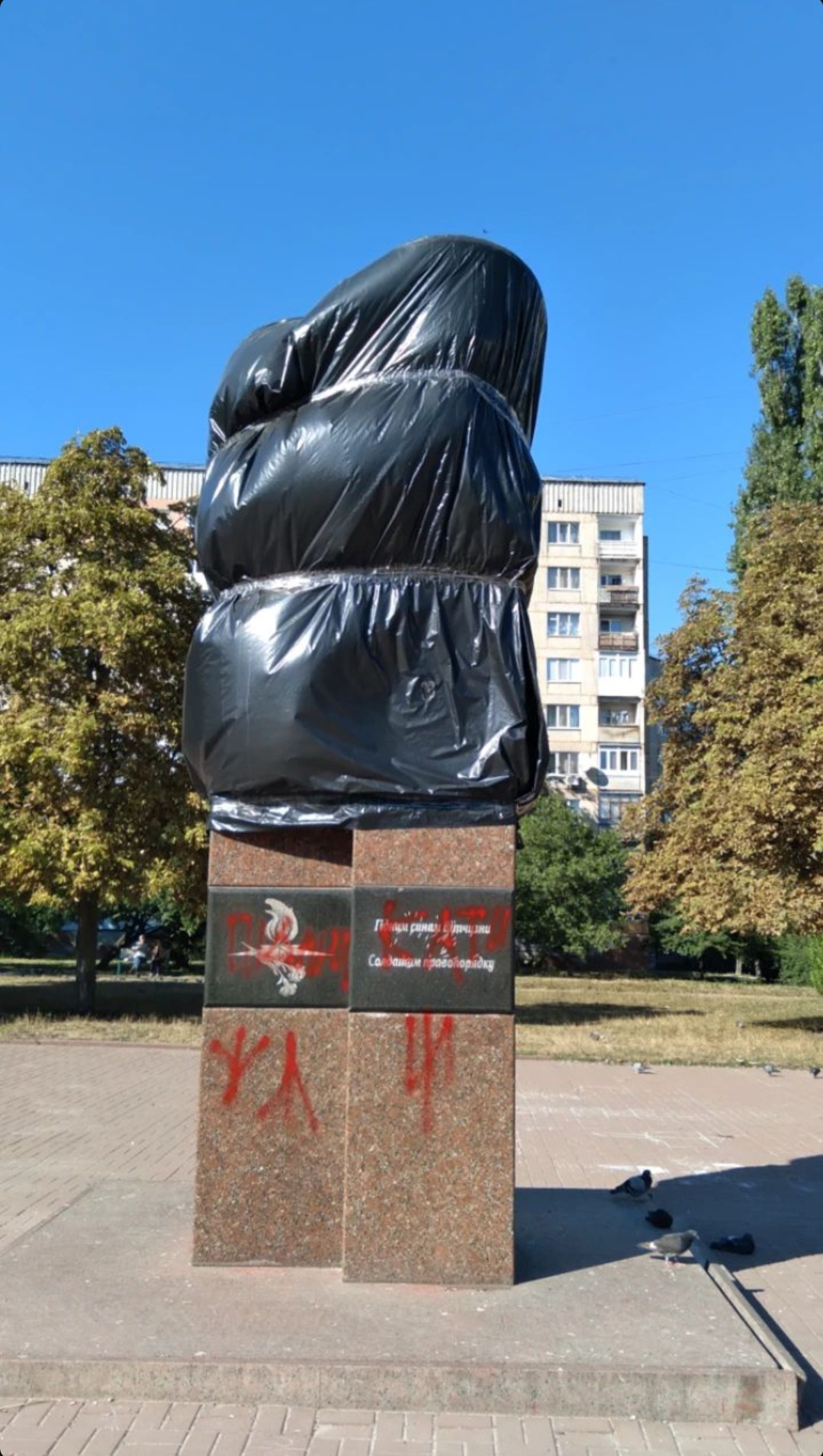
Memorial to the Cheka in Kropyvnytskyi, Ukraine, 2023

During the Russian invasion of Ukraine, many Lenin statues across Ukraine, which had been taken down by the Ukrainians in the preceding years, were re-erected by the Russians in the Russian-controlled areas.

== Polling ==
A November 2016 poll showed that 48% of respondents supported a ban on Communist ideology in Ukraine, 36% were against it and 16% were undecided. It also showed that 41% of respondents supported the initiative to dismantle all monuments to Lenin in the country, whereas 48% were against it and 11% were undecided.

As of 8 April 2022, according to a poll by the sociological group Rating, 76% of Ukrainians support the initiative to rename streets and other objects whose names are associated with the Soviet Union and Russia after the Russian invasion of Ukraine.

== See also ==
- Bans on communist symbols
- Decommunization
- Human rights in Ukraine
- Demolition of monuments to Vladimir Lenin in Ukraine
- List of communist monuments in Ukraine
- List of Ukrainian toponyms that were changed as part of decommunization in 2016
- Lustration in Ukraine
- Derussification in Ukraine
- Soviet imagery during the Russo-Ukrainian War
