= Oleksandr Tkachenko (politician, born 1939) =

Ukrainian politician (1939–2024)

- Олександр Ткаченко
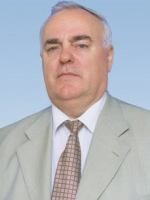
- Tkachenko as a member of parliament in 2006

4th Chairman of the Verkhovna Rada
- In office 7 July 1998 – 21 January 2000
- President: Leonid Kuchma
- Preceded by: Oleksandr Moroz
- Succeeded by: Ivan Plyushch

People's Deputy of Ukraine
- In office 10 May 1994 – 12 December 2012
- Constituency: Cherkasy Oblast, No. 430 (1994–1998); Cherkasy Oblast, No. 195 (1998–2002); Communist Party of Ukraine, No. 8 (2002–2006, 2007–2012); Communist Party of Ukraine, No. 9 (2006–2007)

Personal details
- Born: 7 March 1939 Shpola, Ukrainian SSR, Soviet Union
- Died: 4 January 2024 (aged 84) Kyiv, Ukraine
- Party: Peasant Party of Ukraine (1994–2002); Communist Party of Ukraine (2002–2012)

Oleksandr Mykolaiovych Tkachenko (Ukrainian: Олександр Миколайович Ткаченко; 7 March 1939 – 4 January 2024) was a Ukrainian politician who served as a People's Deputy of Ukraine from 1994 to 2012, variously representing the Peasant Party of Ukraine and the Communist Party of Ukraine. Between 7 July 1998 and 21 January 2000, Tkachenko was the Chairman of the Verkhovna Rada. Awarded with the robe of Prince Yaroslav the Wise.

== Biography ==
Tkachenko was born on 7 March 1939, in Shpola, Kiev Oblast to a peasant family. In 1963, he graduated from the Bila Tserkva Agriculture Institute. Between 1963 and 1981, he worked in Tarashcha Raion, Kyiv Oblast, first as an agronomist and later as a local Communist Party leader. In 1981, he became an inspector of the Central Committee of the Communist Party of Ukraine. In 1982, he was appointed Governor of Ternopil Oblast, and in 1985, he was appointed Minister of Agriculture of the Ukrainian Soviet Socialist Republic.

In 1991 and 1999, he was a candidate in the elections for President of Ukraine. On both occasions he withdrew his candidacy, in favour of Leonid Kravchuk in 1991 and Petro Symonenko in 1999.

Tkachenko was a member of the 11th convocation of the Supreme Soviet of the Ukrainian SSR, and in 1994 was elected to the Verkhovna Rada (parliament of Ukraine) for the first of five consecutive terms. Between May 1994 and April 1998 he was the First Deputy Chairman of the Parliament, and was Chairman of the Verkhovna Rada from 7 July 1998 to 21 January 2000, when was dismissed for violating parliamentary session regulations.

He died on 4 January 2024, and was scheduled to be buried at Baikove Cemetery next to his wife. The 10 years prior to his death he had been ill and used a wheelchair.

Political offices
Preceded by Oleksandr Moroz	Chairman of Verkhovna Rada; 1998–2000	Succeeded by Ivan Plyushch
Preceded by ?	Minister of Rural Economy; 1991–1992	Succeeded by Vasyl Tkachuk
Preceded by ?	State Minister of Agrarian Policy and Food Supply; 1991–1991	Succeeded by ?
Preceded by Anatoliy Statynov	First Deputy Chairman of Council of Ministers; 1990–?	Succeeded by ?
Preceded by Mykhailo Khorunzhyi	Minister of Agriculture; 1985–1989	Succeeded by ?
