= Communist Party of Ukraine =

Banned political party in Ukraine

- Ukrainian name: Комуністична партія України
- Russian name: Коммунистическая партия Украины
- Abbreviation: KPU / КПУ
- First Secretary: Petro Symonenko
- Second Secretary: Igor Alekseyev
- Founded: 19 June 1993 (33 years, 139 days)
- Banned: 16 December 2015 (10 years, 324 days) (banned in court) 6 July 2022 (4 years, 122 days) (ban upheld in court)
- Split from: Socialist Party of Ukraine
- Preceded by: Communist Party of Ukraine (Soviet Union)
- Newspaper: Komunist (since 2000)
- Youth wing: Komsomol of Ukraine
- Membership (2001): 140,000
- Ideology: Communism; Marxism–Leninism; Left-wing populism Left-conservatism; Soviet patriotism By 2010s: Russophilia; Social conservatism
- Political position: Far-left
- National affiliation: Left Opposition (2015–2022)
- Continental affiliation: UCP–CPSU
- International affiliation: IMCWP
- Colors: Red

Party flag

Website
- kpu.ua (archived)

The Communist Party of Ukraine (CPU or KPU) (Note: Ukrainian: Комуністична партія України, romanized: Komunistychna partiya Ukrayiny; Russian: Коммунистическая партия Украины, romanized: Kommunisticheskaya partiya Ukrainy; Abbreviation: KPU, from Ukrainian and Russian "КПУ") is a banned Marxist-Leninist political party in Ukraine. It was founded in 1993 and claimed to be the successor to the Soviet-era Communist Party of Ukraine, which had been banned in 1991. In 2002 it held a "unification" congress when both "old and new" parties merged. The party is a member of the Moscow-based Union of Communist Parties, an umbrella organisation for all communist parties of the former Soviet Union. The party has been led by Petro Symonenko since it was founded.

Communist parties have a long history in Ukraine. With the fall of the Soviet Union, members of the Soviet-era Communist Party of Ukraine formed the Socialist Party of Ukraine. After being revived in 1993, the Communist Party was represented in the Ukrainian parliament from 1994 until the 2014 Ukrainian parliamentary election, which ended a period of parliamentary representation for communists stretching back to 1918. The Communist Party and its predecessor were the largest party in Ukrainian parliamentary elections for the first eight years of free and fair election, from 1990 until 1998.

According to Ukrainian sociologist Volodymyr Ishchenko, by the 2010s the party had "degenerated into a conservative and pro-Russian rather than pro-working class grouping, gradually losing its voters and membership".

During the 2013–2014 Euromaidan protests, the party voted for anti-protest laws. However, it also voted to remove President Viktor Yanukovych from office in the Revolution of Dignity. During the Russo-Ukrainian War which followed, the Security Service of Ukraine said the party was actively helping pro-Russian separatists and Russian proxy forces, which it denied. Regional party cells formed the pro-separatist Communist Party of the Donetsk People's Republic. In May 2015, Ukraine banned Soviet communist symbols. Because of these laws, and the Communist Party's support for Donbas separatists, the party was barred from standing in elections. In December 2015, the Communist Party was banned, for actions "aimed at violating Ukraine's sovereignty and territorial integrity, collaboration with Russian proxy forces, and inciting ethnic hatred". The party appealed the ban to the European Court of Human Rights and various Ukrainian courts, and participated in some elections by joining umbrella groups and running candidates as independents. The Central Election Commission of Ukraine prohibited Symonenko's candidacy for the 2019 Ukrainian presidential election.

Party officials reportedly supported the 2022 Russian invasion of Ukraine. As a result, its ban was upheld and its assets were seized by the state in July 2022.

== History ==
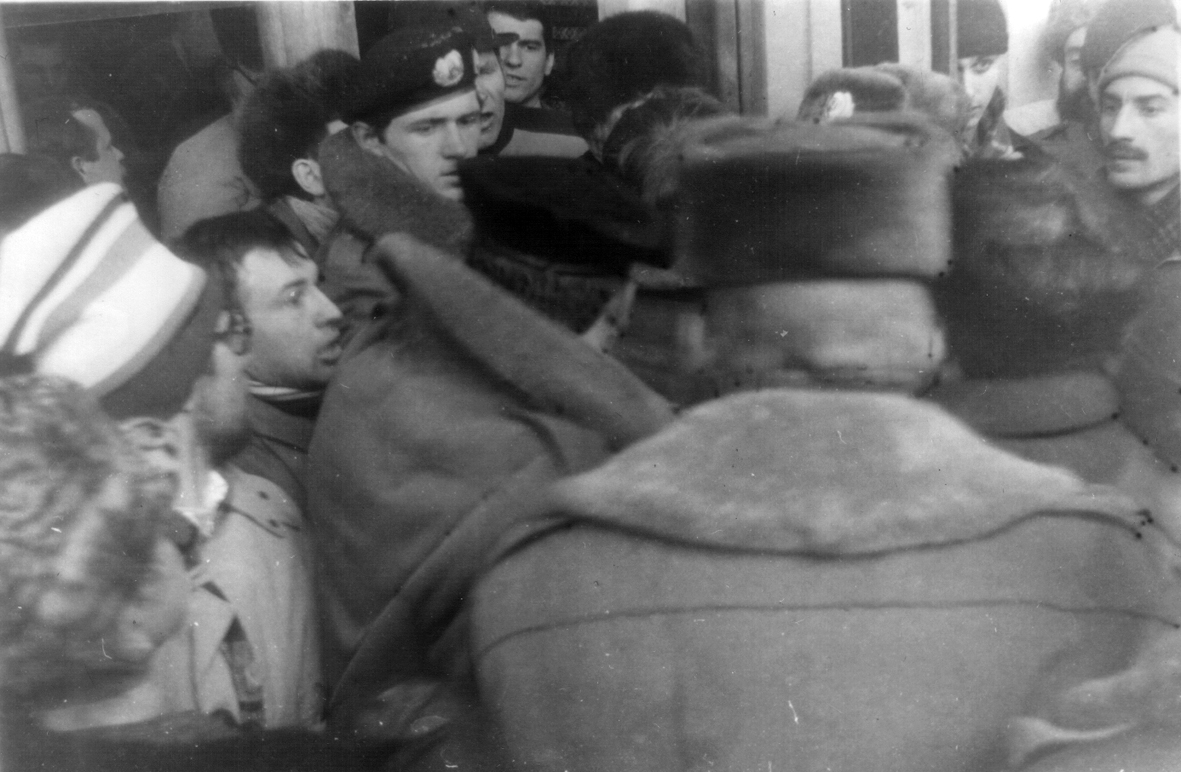
Activists of the People's Movement of Ukraine picketing the reestablishment congress of the Communist Party in Makiivka, 6 March 1993

The KPU's old flag, adopted before Ukraine's 2015 decommunization laws, depicted a hammer and a sickle.

=== Early years and electoral successes ===
The KPU considers itself to be the direct successor to the original Communist Party of Ukraine, a branch of the Communist Party of the Soviet Union (CPSU) which was founded on 5 July 1918 in Moscow. The original communist party existed until 30 August 1991, when the CPSU and its branch in Ukraine were banned. Between 1991 and 1993, several small communist organizations were created throughout Ukraine. "Without clear legality", communists from all over Ukraine convened on 6 March 1993 for the All-Ukrainian Conference for Communists in an attempt to reestablish the KPU. In reaction, the Verkhovna Rada (the Ukrainian parliament) legalized the establishment of communist parties two months later. On 19 June 1993, the 1st Congress of the newly founded KPU was convened. Officially, it was designated as the 29th Congress to denote it as a direct successor to the Soviet KPU and it elected Petro Symonenko as First Secretary.

In the 1994 presidential election, the KPU supported the candidacy of Oleksandr Moroz from the Socialist Party of Ukraine (SPU). The relationship between the KPU and SPU was strong throughout the 1990s, with Moroz even speaking to the 22nd KPU Congress (held in 1999).

In the 1998 Ukrainian parliamentary election the party gained 24.65% of the vote and 123 seats, becoming the largest party in Parliament. The first ten members on the party list were Petro Symonenko (MP), Omelian Parubok (MP), Anatoliy Nalyvaiko (tunneler of the Karl Marks Mine (Yenakieve)), Borys Oliynyk (MP), Valeria Zaklunna-Myronenko (actress of the Lesya Ukrainka Theater (Kyiv)), Adam Martynyuk (the 2nd secretary of the Central Committee of CPU), Anatoliy Draholyuntsev (mechanic-electrician at Luhanskteplovoz), Vasyl Sirenko (Koretsky Institute of State and Law (NANU), unaffiliated), Borys Molchanov (tool craftsman at Dniproshyna) and Anatoliy Strohov (pensioner). The KPU won 121 seats, constituting 19.5% of the seats in the Verkhovna Rada.

The good result in the 1998 election led the KPU to field their own candidate in the 1999 presidential election as they nominated party leader Symonenko. Symonenko received 23.1 percent of the votes in the first round, trailing behind Leonid Kuchma who received 38,0 percent of the votes. In the second round Symonenko received 38,8 percent, losing to Kuchma who received 57,7 percent of the vote.

In 2000, two parties split from the party, namely the Communist Party of Ukraine (renewed) and the Communist Party of Workers and Peasants. The KPU argued that the creation of parties was encouraged by President Leonid Kuchma in order to syphon votes away from their party.

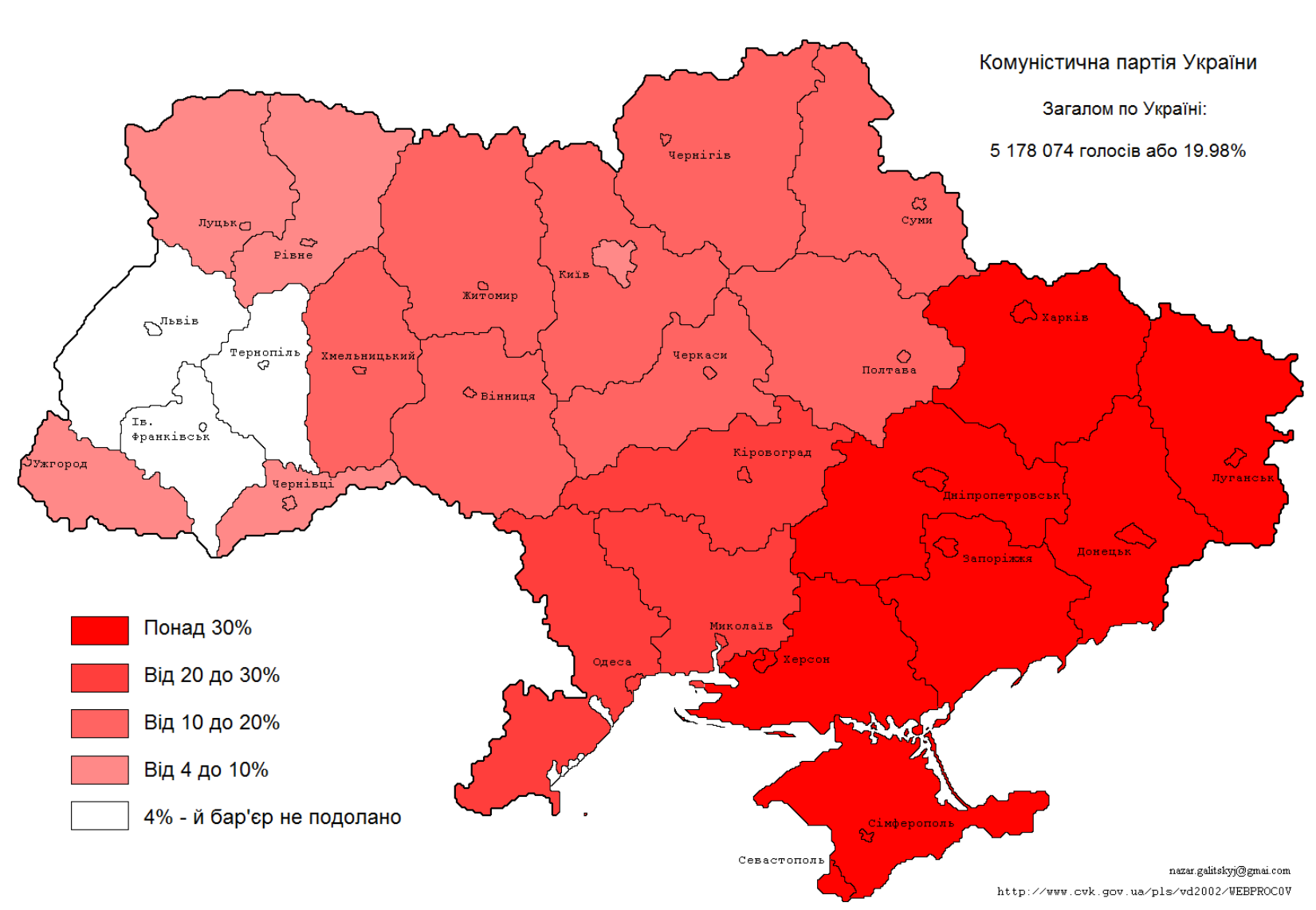
Percentage of votes for Communists in the 2002 parliamentary election

The Constitutional Court of Ukraine recognized in 2001 that the ban on the Communist Party of Ukraine violated the Constitution of Ukraine.

At the parliamentary election on 30 March 2002, the party won 19.98% of the popular vote and 66 out of 450 seats in the Verkhovna Rada. The first ten members on the party list were Petro Symonenko (MP), Omelian Parubok (MP), Ivan Herasymov (Head of the Veterans of Ukraine Organization, unaffiliated), Borys Oliynyk (MP), Valeria Zaklunna-Myronenko (MP), Adam Martynyuk (MP), Stanislav Hurenko (MP), Oleksandr Tkachenko (MP), Anatoliy Nalyvaiko (MP) and Oleh Blokhin (MP, unaffiliated).

=== Electoral decline ===
Symonenko's support sharply declined at the time of the 2004 presidential election. Symonenko received 5% of the votes and came in fourth place, unable to get into the controversial runoff which caused the Orange Revolution.

Since then, the party lost much support, particularly after the Orange Revolution. In the 2006 parliamentary election, the party won 3.66% and 21 seats. The first ten members on the party list were Petro Symonenko (MP), Adam Martynyuk (MP), Ivan Herasymov (MP), Kateryna Samoilyk (MP), Omelian Parubok (MP), Valeria Zaklunna-Myronenko (MP), Oleksandr Holub (MP), Valentyn Matvyeyev (MP), Oleksandr Tkachenko (MP) and Petro Tsybenko (MP).

No later than 2006, the Communist Party office in Donetsk on regular basis provided material and logistical assistance to the separatist organization Donetsk Republic (banned in 2007) which with the assistance of the Communist Party was spreading printed information materials of separatist orientation in authorship of the ideologist of Donetsk internationalism Dmitriy Kornilov as well as by collecting signatures for "independence of Donbass" agitated for violation of territorial integrity of Ukraine through seceding several oblasts of Ukraine from Ukraine and uniting them into one quasi state formation based on Donetsk, Dnipropetrovsk, Luhansk, Zaporizhzhia and Kherson "republics". Even after the Donetsk Republic Party was banned for separatism on 6 November 2007 by the Donetsk district administrative court on the suit of the Chief Justice Administration of Donetsk Oblast based on materials of the Security Service of Ukraine, the Donetsk branch of Communists did not cease to assist separatists with its tents and printing capabilities periodically conducting joint campaigns with them.

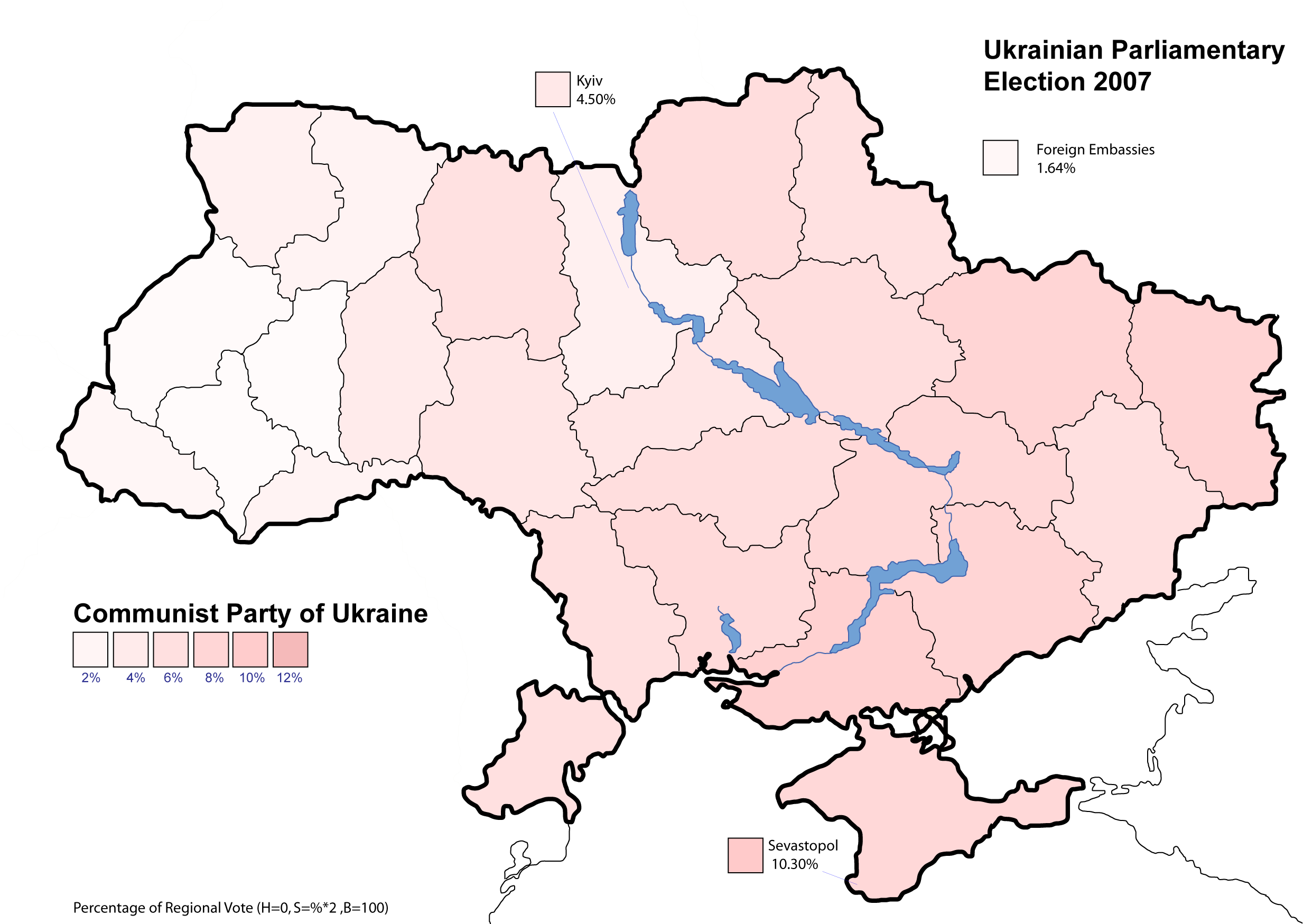
Percentage of vote for Communists in the 2007 Ukrainian parliamentary election

In the parliamentary election on 30 September 2007, the party won 5.39% of the popular vote and 27 out of 450 seats. The first ten members on the party list were Petro Symonenko (MP), Yevhen Volynets (tunneler of the Vasily Chapayev Mine (Shakhtarsk)), Maryna Perestenko (Head of the Mars farm (Simferopol Raion)), Ivan Herasymov (MP), Yuriy Haidayev (Minister of Healthcare, unaffiliated), Adam Martynyuk (1st deputy Chairman of parliament), Valeriy Bevz (Deputy Minister of Emergencies), Oleksandr Tkachenko (MP), Oleksandr Holub (MP) and Ihor Aleksyeyev (MP). The party participated in the 2010 presidential election as part of the Election bloc of left and central left political forces.

The party participated in the 2010 presidential election as part of the Election bloc of left and central left political forces.

The Communist Party was part of the parliamentary coalition called "Stability and Reforms" that supported the First Azarov government.

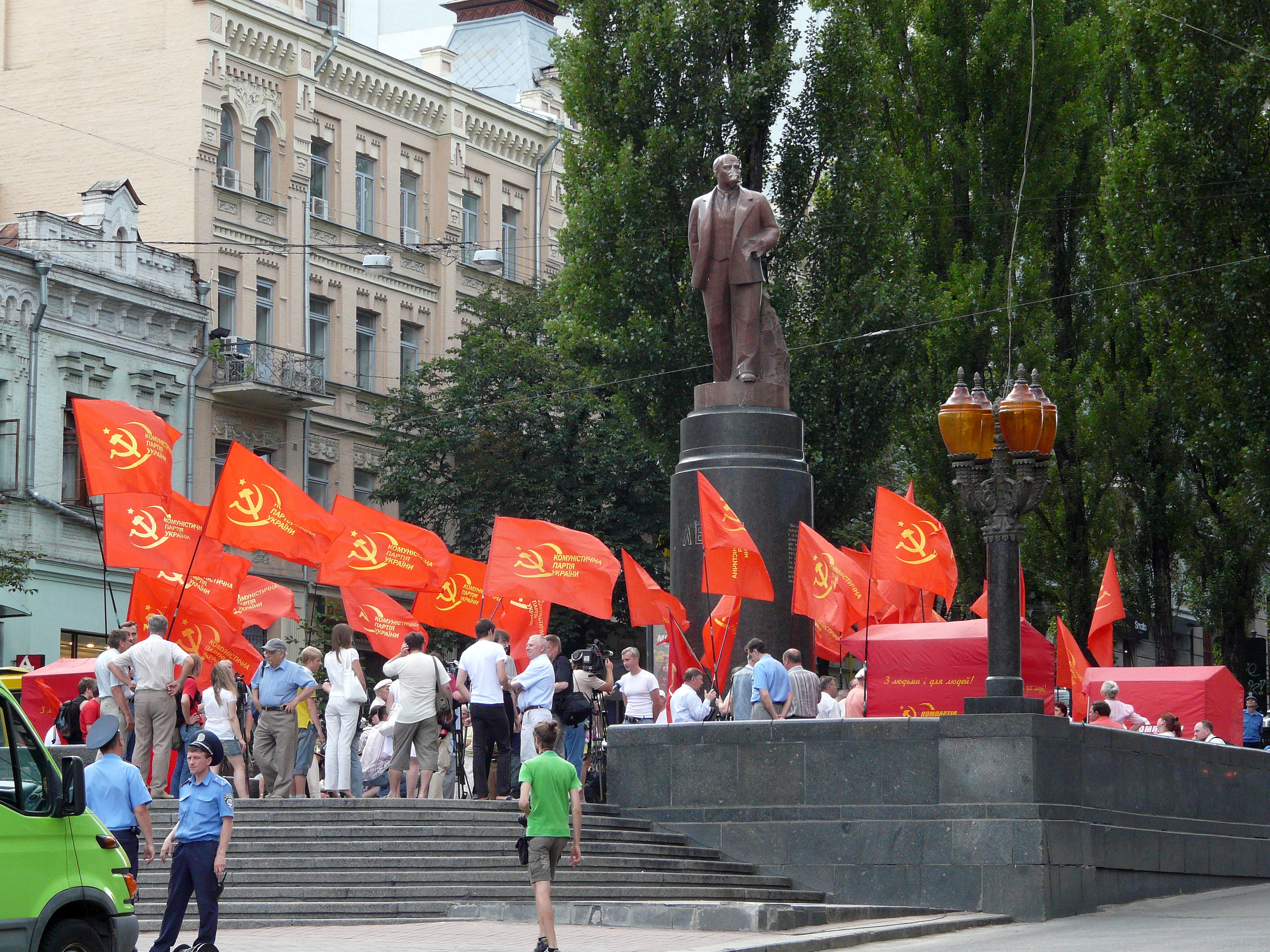
A communist demonstration near the Lenin monument in Kyiv, 2009

On 28 November 2006, the Ukrainian Parliament adopted the Law of Ukraine "About the 1932–1933 Holodomor in Ukraine". The first article of the document states: "The Holodomor is a genocide against the Ukrainian people". The second article states that the public denial of the Holodomor as a genocide is recognized as desecration of the memory of millions of victims, disparaging of Ukrainian people and is unlawful. On 13 January 2010, the Kyiv Appellate Court reviewed the criminal case on the fact of committing genocide (crime against humanity) and agreed with the conclusions of the investigation that the leadership of the Soviet Union, including Joseph Stalin and others, had purposely created such living conditions designed to physically eliminate a part of the Ukrainian national group. The court found Stalin and others guilty of indirectly committing the crime. Less than four months after the ruling, on 5 May 2010, the Communist Party branch office in Zaporizhzhia Oblast publicly unveiled a monument of Stalin in Zaporizhzhia. Members of the Communist Party were criticized for hindering journalist activity and cursing at protesters during the event. Three people also reportedly fainted from the heat during the unveiling ceremony, and one woman later died from a heatstroke. The Communist Party was criticized for a statement it later issued in memory of the woman who died, which said, "She died a worthy death in front of Stalin."

In the 2010 local elections, the party scored between 5% and 12% of the votes in all Ukrainian Oblasts, except in Western Ukraine and Kyiv Oblast, where they almost had no voters.

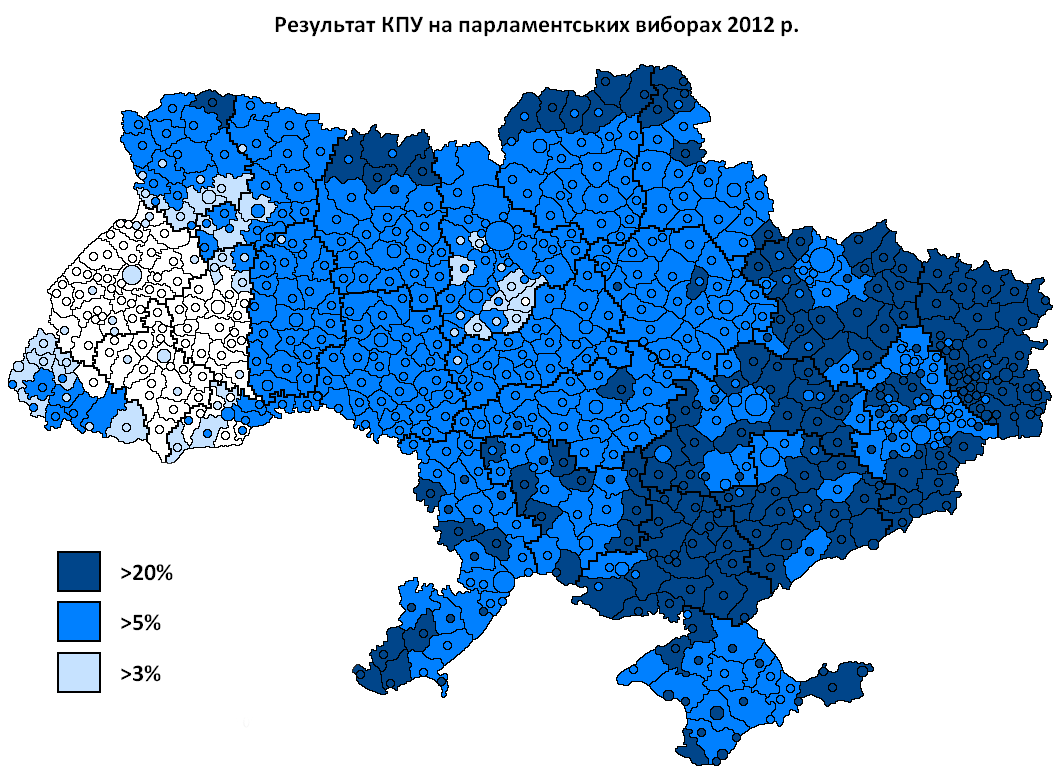
Support of Communists in the 2012 parliamentary election

In the 2012 Ukrainian parliamentary election, the party won 13.18% of the national votes and no constituencies (it had competed in 220 of the 225 constituencies) and thus 32 seats. The party did win about one and a half million more votes compared with the results of the previous election. Independent candidate Oksana Kaletnyk joined the Communist parliamentary faction on 12 December 2012. Importance of Kaletnyk joining the Communists was due to parliamentary regulations on obtaining its own parliamentary factions which required to have at least one deputy who came to parliament by winning a constituency. Oleh Tyahnybok tried to challenge the creation of Communist faction, but on 30 January 2013 the Higher Administrative Court of Ukraine declined his petition. Kaletnyk left the faction (at her own request) on 29 May 2014. The first ten members on the party list were Petro Symonenko (MP), Petro Tsybenko (MP), Iryna Spirina (Head of Psychiatric Department (Dnipropetrovsk Medical Academy)), Spiridon Kilinkarov (MP), Oleksandr Prysyazhnyuk (unemployed), Ihor Aleksyeyev (MP), Ihor Kalyetnik (Head of the State Customs Service of Ukraine), Adam Martynyuk (1st deputy Chairman of parliament), Valentyn Matvyeyev (MP) and Yevhen Marmazov (MP). In 2007 and 2012, the electorate of the party was estimated to be very loyal to the party.

The party supported the vote of Mykola Azarov's candidacy for the post of Prime Minister that created the Second Azarov government. Symonenko stated on 28 December 2012 that the Communist Party of Ukraine and Azarov's (and President Viktor Yanukovych's) Party of Regions had not concluded any agreements concerning the Communist support, but that his party had supported Azarov's nomination because Azarov had told them his government was ready to implement the program on Ukraine's accession to the Customs Union of Belarus, Kazakhstan and Russia. Symonenko added that should Azarov fail to fulfill the promise of Ukraine's joining this customs union, the Communists would initiate his resignation. The government continued to negotiate with the European Union for Ukraine's integration in the European Union while (according to President Yanukovych) it was also in negotiations with Russia to "find the right model" for cooperation with the Customs Union of Belarus, Kazakhstan and Russia.

=== Ukrainian Revolution ===
From November 2013 until February 2014, there were large protests throughout Ukraine. They were sparked by President Yanukovych's sudden decision not to sign the political association and free trade agreement with the EU, instead choosing closer ties to Russia.

The Communist Party of Ukraine opposed the protests, but did not support Yanukovych. In January 2014 the party supported the anti-protest laws that severely restricted freedom of speech and the right to protest. In January and February 2014, clashes in Kyiv between protesters and Berkut special riot police resulted in the deaths of 108 protesters and 13 police officers.

On 22 February 2014, Ukraine's parliament voted 328–0 (about 73% of the parliament's 450 members) to remove Yanukovych from his post and to schedule an early presidential election for 25 May. The thirty deputies of the Communist Party voted for his removal.

In February 2014, the party came out in firm opposition to the violence and identified the protest movement as a "coup" to overthrow the elected government and replace it with a pro-NATO regime and in an open plea from the First Secretary called for all communist and left-wing movements around the world to condemn the events as such. However, the party did vote to remove Yanukovych.

=== During the Russo-Ukrainian war ===
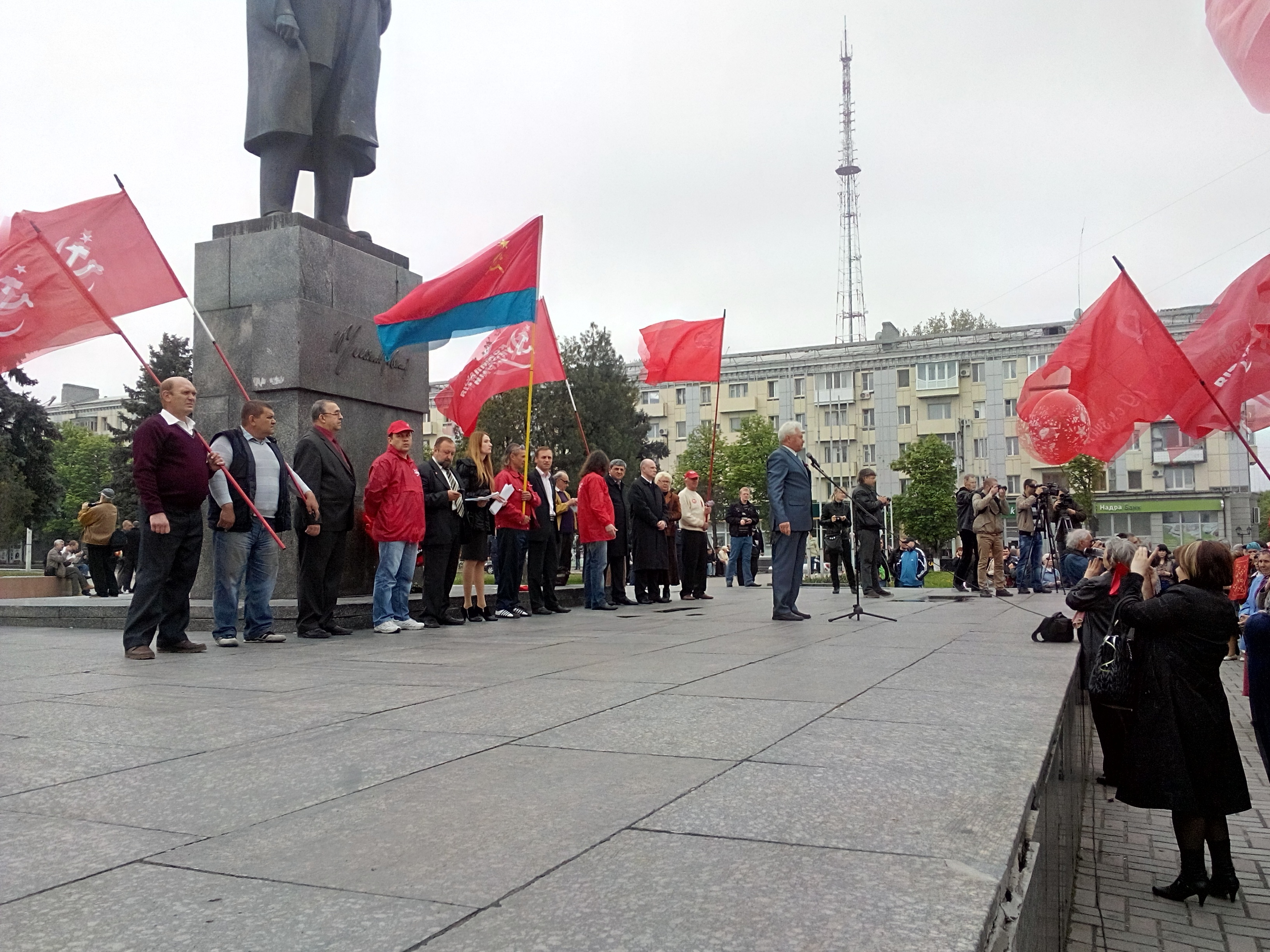
A Communist meeting in Luhansk, 2014

Immediately after the revolution, pro-Russian, counter-revolutionary protests erupted in southern and eastern Ukraine. Russia occupied and then annexed Crimea, while armed pro-Russian separatists seized government buildings and proclaimed the independent states of Donetsk and Luhansk, sparking the Donbas war.

The Security Service of Ukraine gathered intelligence that the Communist Party of Ukraine had been helping the Russian proxy forces. In May 2014, Ukraine's Acting President, Oleksandr Turchynov, asked the Ministry of Justice to examine whether the party was involved in actions aimed at violating Ukraine's sovereignty and territorial integrity, and to take steps to ban the party if this is proven.

On 11 April, there was a scuffle in the Verkhovna Rada between KPU leader Petro Symonenko and two MPs from the far-right "Svoboda" party, after Symonenko blamed them for the Russian annexation of Crimea and the pro-Russian unrest. After repeatedly calling for calm, the parliament chairman suspended the session for fifteen minutes. On 6 May, a majority of MPs voted to expel the Communist Party from the parliamentary session hall for making a pro-separatist declaration.

In the 2014 Ukrainian presidential election, Symonenko initially again ran as a candidate of his party, but he withdrew from the race on 16 May. The Central Election Commission was unable to remove his name from the ballot because he withdrew from the race after the deadline of 1 May. In the election, he received 1.5% of the vote.

On 8 July, the Ministry of Justice asked Kyiv's District Administrative Court to ban the activity of the party as a result of "a large amount of evidence regarding illegal activities and illegal actions on the part of the Communist Party" (according to Justice Minister Pavlo Petrenko). The Party of the European Left and the European United Left–Nordic Green Left grouping in the European Parliament condemned the possible ban and declared their solidarity with the KPU. Russia's State Duma denounced the ban too and said it was "an attempt by the new Kyiv authorities to force political and civil forces that do not agree with the path taken by the ultranationalist powers to shut up". The KPU also received solidarity from the National Union of Rail, Maritime and Transport Workers (RMT) in Britain.

On 1 July, six MPs left the Communist Party faction in parliament, reducing it to 23 members. On 22 July, a vote supported by 232 MPs gave the Chairman of the Verkhovna Rada (the speaker of Ukraine's parliament) the power to dissolve a faction that has lost some of its members compared to the number it had while it was formed during the first parliamentary session after the previous election, pending a signature from President Petro Poroshenko. Later that day, Poroshenko signed this bill, giving effect to this new parliamentary regulation. The next day, speaker and former Acting President Turchynov announced the party's impending dissolution and added to MPs: "We only have to tolerate this party for another day". The party's faction in parliament was dissolved on 24 July by Turchynov. That same day, it was announced that 308 criminal proceedings had been opened against members of the party. Communist Party members were accused of openly supporting the Russian annexation of Crimea, supporting the breakaway Donetsk People's Republic and Luhansk People's Republic, and agitating for Russian annexation of Dnipropetrovsk Oblast.

On 4 September, the Kyiv District Administrative Court indefinitely postponed the hearing about the ban of the party.

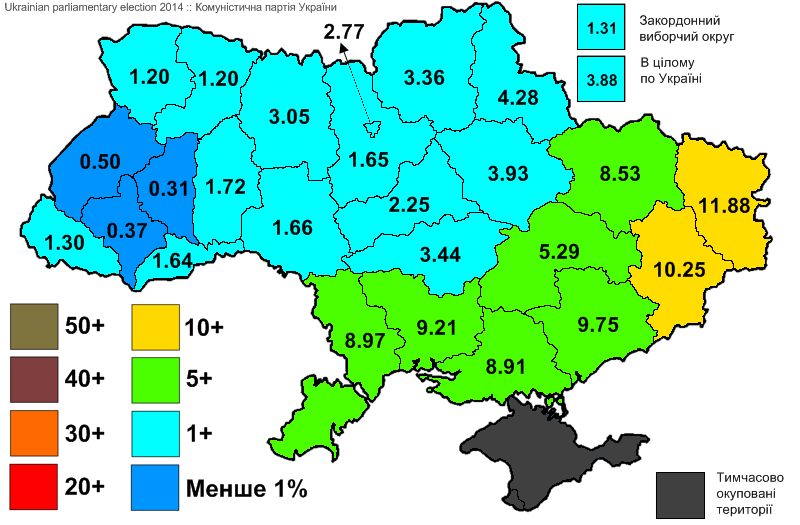
A map showing the results of the Communist Party of Ukraine in the 2014 elections

The October 2014 parliamentary election further marginalized the party as it won no constituency seats and came 1.12% short of reaching the 5% election threshold. This meant that for the first time since 1918, Communists were not represented in Ukrainian national politics. The first ten members on the party list for the 2014 Ukrainian parliamentary election were Petro Symonenko (MP), Adam Martynyuk (MP), Kateryna Samoylyk (senior), Vasyl Sirenko (Koretsky Institute of State and Law, non-partisan), Petro Tsybenko (MP), Ihor Aleksyeyev (MP), Serhiy Hordiyenko (MP), Yevhen Marmazov (MP), Spiridon Kilinkarov (MP) and Serhiy Khrapov (unemployed).

In May 2015, laws that banned Soviet communist symbols (the so-called "decommunization laws") came into effect in Ukraine, meaning that the party could not use communist symbols or sing the Soviet national hymn or "The Internationale". In a 24 July decree based on these laws, the Ukrainian Interior Ministry stripped the party of its right to participate in elections and stated that it was continuing the court actions (which started in July 2014) to end the registration of Ukraine's communist parties.

On 30 September, the District Administrative Court in Kyiv banned two smaller communist parties: the Communist Party of Workers and Peasants and the Communist Party of Ukraine (renewed). However, the Communist Party was not banned because it had filed an appeal against the Justice Ministry's decree on its activity termination.

The party decided to take part in the October 2015 local elections as part of the umbrella party Left Opposition. According to the Interior Ministry, this was legal as long as the new party did not use communist symbols. Other party members took part in this election as Nova Derzhava. The political party Nova Derzhava was established in 2012. On 1 August, it elected a new leader Oleh Melnyk. Formally along with the Communist Party, it is also a member of the Left Opposition Association.

In late 2015, 19 local party leaders from the party's South and East Ukraine organizations resigned from the central committee to protest against the repression of internal dissent they blamed on Symonenko.

==== Banning ====
On 16 December 2015, at the request of the Ministry of Justice, the District Administrative Court in Kyiv banned the Communist Party for actions aimed at violating Ukraine's sovereignty and territorial integrity, collaboration with Russian proxy forces, and inciting ethnic hatred. This ban was criticized by John Dalhuisen of Amnesty International, who said the ban was "the same style of draconian measures used to stifle dissent" in the Soviet Union. On 25 January 2016, the Supreme Administrative Court of Ukraine denied the party in the consideration of the cassation of the (16 December 2015) ban. The court suspended the appeal for the time being until the Constitutional Court determines the legitimacy of the law on decommunization. Nevertheless, the party appealed its ban at the European Court of Human Rights. The attempts to ban the party never did forbid individual members of the party to take part in elections as an independent candidate.

The party still sends in its required financial reports and is still listed on the website of the Ministry of Justice and the website of the Department of State Registration and Notary. In February 2019, the Central Election Commission of Ukraine refused to register the candidacy of Symonenko for the 2019 Ukrainian presidential election due to the fact that the statute, name and symbolism of the Communist Party did not comply with the 2015 decommunization laws.

According to a Kyiv Polytechnic professor, who published an article in The Guardian, the party came into conflict with the Ukrainian government after the Revolution of Dignity due to prominent displays of support for ousted Ukrainian President Viktor Yanukovych during the Euromaidan protests and alleged involvement with the separatist movement in Donbas as well as the party's pro-Russian government agenda. However, the party did vote in favour of the impeachment of Yanukovych. Two days after the Ukrainian parliament changed its regulations regarding the required size of parliamentary groups, the Communist Party faction was dissolved on 24 July 2014.

According to political scientist Tadeusz A. Olszański, the party "effectively supports the separatist rebellion" during the Russo-Ukrainian War.

Explaining the withdrawal of the status of political party from the KPU and two of its satellites, the secretary of state security and defense Oleksandr Turchynov stated in July 2015 that the Communist Party took a treacherous position from the very first days of Russian aggression and acted as its Fifth Column.

==== Seizure of assets ====
On 6 July 2022, following the Russian invasion of Ukraine, the KPU was again banned after a Lviv court ruling which turned over all its assets, including party buildings and funds, to the Ukrainian state. In a statement, the Eighth Administrative Appeal Court said that it had satisfied the claims of the Ministry of Justice and ordered the party's banning. "The activity of the Communist Party of Ukraine is prohibited; the property, funds and other assets of the party, its regional, city, district organisations, primary centres and other structural entities have been transferred to the state."

During the Russian invasion, the party was reported to have taken a pro-Russian stance, and the party's leader Petro Symonenko in March had fled to Belarus with the assistance of Russian forces during the Kyiv offensive.

In October 2022, Symonenko took part in the International Meeting of Communist and Workers' Parties in Havana, Cuba. During the speech, he blamed the United States and the United Kingdom for the war, and said they wanted to "use Ukraine against Russia and Taiwan against China".

In August 2023, the Security Service of Ukraine opened an investigation against him on the charges of sedition and treason.

== Ideology ==
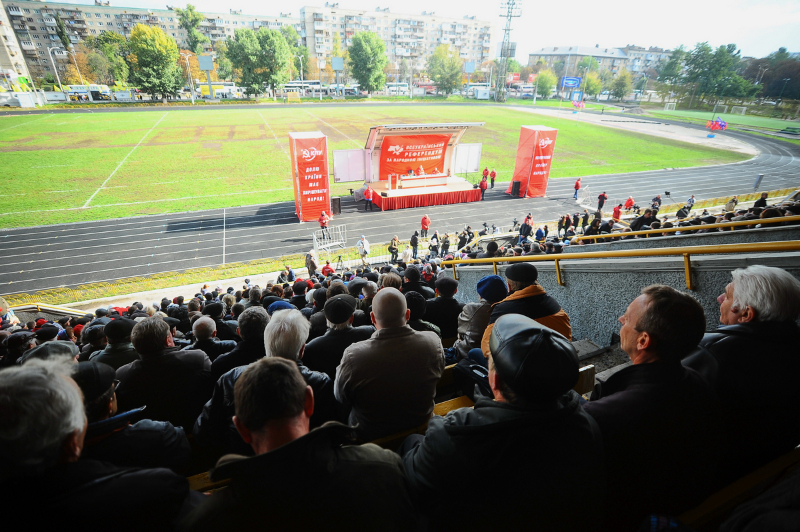
A congress of the Communist Party in Kyiv's Spartak Stadium, September 2013

In its statute, the Communist Party claims that "on voluntary basis it unites citizens of Ukraine who are supporters of the Communist idea". The party considers itself a successor of the Communist Party of Ukraine of the Soviet Union and calls itself a "battle detachment of RKP(b)–VKP(b)–KPSS". The party claims that prohibition of that party in August 1991 was unlawful, which was confirmed by the decision of the Constitutional Court of Ukraine on 27 December 2001. The party sets itself in an opposition to any government and seeks a full restoration of the socialist state in the country without any particular association with any other political parties.

=== Program ===
- Political sphere: liquidation of presidency as an institution, strengthening of democratic measures of state and public life; electoral legislation reform ensuring a proper share of representation of workers, peasants, intelligentsia, women, youth in Verkhovna Rada of Ukraine and local government; introduction of practice to recall deputies and judges who received vote of no confidence; election of judges of prime level; filling with real meaning and proper financial support regional and local government; introduction in the country a system of public control; creation of labor group councils vested with powers to monitor economic activity of businesses; suppression of corruption, organized crime, particularly in the upper echelon of power; elimination of benefits and privileges for officials; federalization of Ukraine; comprehensive development of Ukrainian language and culture, granting Russian language the status of state language; changing of Ukraine's state symbol, lyrics and music of the State anthem.
- Economic policy: modernization and public control over economy, nationalization of strategic businesses; establishing a competitive state sector of economy, energy independence; reforms in Agro-Industrial Complex, Housing and Communal Services, etc.; prohibition of private property.
- Social sphere: liquidation of poverty, social justice, system of progressive taxation and state price regulation, free medicine, secondary and tertiary education; full compensation of deposits in the Soviet Savings Bank.
- Spiritual sphere: quality youth politics; preservation of historical and cultural heritage including Soviet; increased punishment for distribution of narcotics, human trafficking, prostitution, promotion of pornography, violence; combating immorality, vulgarity, cynicism, national chauvinism, xenophobia, falsification of history, fascism, neo-Nazism, anti-Communism, anti-Sovietism; banning of neo-Nazi organizations in Ukraine, criminal penalties for acts of fascism; freedom of worldview and expression of faith, secular state.
- Foreign policy: non-aligned military status, independent foreign policy, active position on creation of a new European system of collective security, reform of the Armed Forces of Ukraine, review international agreements with WTO and IMF, membership and active position in the CIS, Customs Union and Eurasian Economic Community of the Russian Federation, Belarus and Kazakhstan.

=== Soviet legacy ===
The KPU was established as "the inheritor of the ideas and traditions of the KPU, as it existed until its banning in August 1991". In general, the party has laid weight on nostalgia for the Soviet Union to gain votes. In contrast to many parts of the former Soviet Union where leftist conservatives have tried to win votes by promoting local nationalism, the KPU supports a form of Soviet nationalism, considering the establishment of an independent Ukraine as illegal. The party has remained loyal to the legacy of the Soviet Union. In 1998, to celebrate the would-be 80th anniversary of the Soviet Union it published Historical Thesis, a text which painted a rosy picture of the former state. The Soviet Union is barely criticized and controversial events such as the Great Purge and Holodomor are not mentioned in the party press. There are some who are favorable to Joseph Stalin's legacy, giving the impression that things "only began to go wrong with [Nikita] Khrushchev's 'adventurism'". Despite all this, when the Soviet Union and the Communist Party of the Soviet Union (CPSU) is criticized at all, the favored line is that the party and state lost their belief in key Leninist principles. Vladimir Lenin, the founder of the Soviet Union, "is still considered sacrosanct" by the party and official pronouncements talk of the "Leninist Communist Party of Ukraine" and more precisely that the KPU continues "speaking in the words of Lenin".

Symonenko has criticized the label of conservative on the KPU, stating that the party is not willing to abandon its own history. He has referred to the dissolution of the Soviet Union as "the tragic events of the recent past". Further, the KPU believes the Soviet Union "was criminally destroyed". The party believes that Ukraine has been living off the legacy of the Soviet Union since its independence. However, certain concessions to the present have been made and at the 2nd KPU Congress it was stated that "it would be utopian to try and revive a socio-economic system of different relations, which existed in different conditions, under different principles and different organizations of production and distribution, different social-class structures of society, a different level of consciousness".

=== Marxism ===
The party adheres and believes in the Marxian concepts of class struggle and historical materialism. Their ongoing belief in historical materialism cements their views that the socialist mode of production will still be the society of the future. It could be said that the party believed stronger than ever in the possibility of a socialist future since the "careerists", symbolized by Mikhail Gorbachev, Boris Yeltsin and Leonid Kravchuk, were gone.

The KPU believes that since the West has developed into a post-industrial society, capitalism through globalization was actively "de-modernizing" Ukraine. This was in their favor since de-modernization would lead to the reestablishment of a dominant proletarian class. As Vasyl Tereshchuk, a former party theoretician expelled in 2005, noted: "People are surviving on what they accumulated in the years of Soviet power: that is, they are not yet a classic proletariat as they still have much to lose (a flat, a car, a dacha, etc.). But their full proletarianization will come sooner or later". Secondly, the dissolution of the Soviet Union directly led to the reestablishment of class antagonism in society. This antagonism led to the exploitation of the proletariat by "a comprador bourgeoisie ... behind which stands world imperialism headed by the USA". According to Symonenko, on this basis there was no chance for a social democratic movement ever to develop in Ukraine. The "softening of class antagonism in the West" which had led to the establishment of social democratic parties "was only possible because the local working class, as part of the 'golden billion', lived 'as parasites on the labour of the countries of the world periphery' to which Ukraine was rapidly being consigned. Ukraine could not expect any 'lessening of class antagonism, only the reverse". Symonenko appreciates the economical aid and partnership with China and believes the party should emulate the Chinese Communist Party, in order to give the country back to the working class and "build our country into a strong country like China".

=== Views on nationalism ===
At least in the beginning, the party is best described as Soviet patriotic. As Yurii Solomatin, a member of parliament, noted in 2000, "we are Soviet communists; we are Soviet people; we are Soviet patriots". The party continues speaking about the existence of a "Soviet people" and "Soviet homeland" and at the beginning no concessions were given to local Ukrainian nationalism. There has been no talk of establishing a national communism unique to Ukraine and the 1st KPU Congress even criticized the notion of establishing a unique "Ukrainian communism". Instead, the KPU has opted promoting Ukraine as a "bi-cultural state". At the 1st KPU Congress, Symonenko told the delegates that "'the interests, rights and specific traits of one nation above those of other nations and nationalities', and in which 'the Ukrainian language' should not be 'over'-privileged, but left alone to enjoy 'its natural development, purged of the imposed language of the diaspora. The Russian language, as the native language of half the population of Ukraine, [should be given] the status of a state language alongside Ukrainian". Their views on patriotism is highly nostalgic. When the Union of Communist Parties – Communist Party of the Soviet Union (UCP–CPSU), a loose organization of post-Soviet parties was formed, it was met with open arms. However, when the Communist Party of the Russian Federation proposed in 1995 to transform the organization into a modern-day Comintern, the KPU opposed because of their Soviet patriotic views.

In recent years, their commitment to Soviet patriotism has been partially replaced with a vaguer Eurasianism. Wishing not to reestablish a union with Russia "as a protectorate of the Russian bourgeoisie", "the Ukrainian Communists have rediscovered the natural link from Soviet to East Slavic or Eurasian nationalism in the supposed common 'economic civilization' and proclivity for collective labour of all the East Slavic peoples". As noted in the party journal Communist, the "'Soviet man ... did not emerge from nothing before him stood the courageous Slavic-Rusich, the labour-loving Ukrainian peasant, the self-sacrificing Cossack". At the 4th KPU Congress, the party conceded that Ukraine would not join any particular union as long as it weakened the country's sovereignty. At the same time, Petro Symonenko publicly backed Ukraine's membership in the Eurasian Customs Union.

Symonenko has often been referred to as a Ukrainophobe, despite being of Ukrainian ethnicity. Symonenko made controversy in 2007 when he accused the Ukrainian nationalist figure Roman Shukhevych of receiving two Iron Crosses from Adolf Hitler. Shukhevych's children submitted a lawsuit against Symonenko in response. The Pechersk District Court of Kyiv city declared that Symonenko failed to present any proof of his claim and obligated "to refute the false information he spread about Roman Shukhevych at the next plenary session of the Verkhovna Rada of Ukraine after the court's decision enters into force".

== Criticism ==
Writing on The Guardian, Ukrainian sociologist Volodymyr Ishchenko described the KPU as a "conservative and pro-Russian group", whose leaders "became a part of the bourgeois elite and invited business support for their cause", pointing out that the richest deputy of the 7th Ukrainian Verkhovna Rada (Oksana Kalietnik) was a member of the Communist faction. Thus, according to Ishchenko "the only things the party has in common with the determined Bolshevik revolutionaries of the past who spared neither themselves nor others are devotion to the Soviet symbols and appeals to empty 'Marxist-Leninist' phrases".

After the start of Euromaidan and the Revolution of Dignity, the party newspaper Komunist published an article comparing the protests to riots in Black ghettoes in the United States during the 1960s; the article, titled "White on the outside, black on the inside", stated that "at least in New York, Los Angeles and San Francisco the police sometimes make raids on such places and simply kill a few rabid Negroes. [...] Even the dark-skinned vendors in Kyiv second hand shops seem a bit more civilized than our 'light-skinned brothers' from the western regions of the country, who have gathered on the Maidan". The article was widely condemned as racist.

== Election results ==
=== Parliamentary elections ===
Verkhovna Rada
Year	Party-list			Constituency/total	Overall seats won	Seat change	Government
Year	Popular vote	%	Seats/total	Constituency/total	Overall seats won	Seat change	Government
1994	3,683,332	13.6%	—N/a	86/338	86 / 450	▲86	Government
1998	6,550,353	25.4%	84/225	27/220	121 / 450	▲35	Minority support
2002	5,178,074	20.8%	59/225	7/225	66 / 450	▼55	Opposition
2006	929,591	3.7%	21/450	—N/a	21 / 450	▼45	Coalition government
2007	1,257,291	5.4%	27/450	—N/a	27 / 450	▲6	Opposition
2012	2,687,246	13.2%	32/225	0/220	32 / 450	▲5	Minority support
2014	608,756	3.87%	0/225	0/198	0 / 450	▼32	Extra-parliamentary
2019	Registration denied		0/225	0/199	0 / 450	Steady	Extra-parliamentary

=== Presidential elections ===
Presidency of Ukraine
Election year	Candidate	First round		Second round	
Election year	Candidate	No. of overall votes	% of overall vote	No. of overall votes	% of overall vote
1994	Oleksandr Moroz (endorsed by the CPU)	3,466,541	13.3		
1999	Petro Symonenko	5,849,077	23.1	10,665,420	38.8
2004	Petro Symonenko	1,396,135	5.0		
2010	Petro Symonenko	872,877	3.5		
2014	Petro Symonenko	272,723	1.5		
2019	Petro Symonenko	Registration denied			

== Ministerial appointments ==
- March–December 2007: Yuriy Haidayev Ministry of Healthcare (Ukraine) (second Yanukovych government)
  - Haidayev was officially unaffiliated, but he was on the party list to parliament from the Communist Party

== Splinter parties ==
- Communist Party of Ukraine (renewed)
- Communist Party of Workers and Peasants
- Communist Party of the Donetsk People's Republic

== See also ==
- Antifascist Committee of Ukraine, a committee of the Communist Party of Ukraine acting as a separate organization
- Socialist Party of Ukraine
