= Banderite =

Far-right groups of Ukrainian nationalists

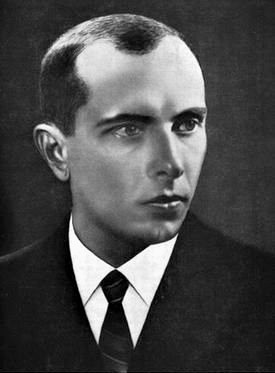
Stepan Bandera

A Banderite or Banderovite (Ukrainian: бандерівець, romanized: banderivets; Polish: banderowiec; Russian: бандеровец, romanized: banderovets) is a name for members of OUN-B, a faction of the Organization of Ukrainian Nationalists (OUN). The term, used from late 1940 onward, derives from the name of Stepan Bandera (1909–1959), the ultranationalist leader of the OUN-B faction from 1940 to 1959. Because of the brutality utilized by OUN-B members, the word "Banderite" quickly earned a negative connotation, particularly among Poles and Jews. By 1942, the expression was well-known and frequently used in western Ukraine to describe the Ukrainian Insurgent Army partisans, OUN-B members or "apparently, other Ukrainian perpetrators". The OUN-B had been engaged in various atrocities, including the murder of civilians, most of them ethnic Poles, Jews, and Romani people.

In Soviet propaganda, "Banderite" became a pejorative term for Ukrainian nationalists in general, regardless of their individual opinions of Bandera. In Soviet society, the word "Banderite" at times served as an ethnic slur for Ukrainian-speakers in general, especially for those from Western Ukraine; as such, "Banderstadt" (Russian: Бандерштадт, romanized: Bandershtadt) became a common nickname in the Soviet Union for Lviv. This usage persists in neighbouring Russia under Vladimir Putin, particularly following Bandera's posthumous decoration as a Hero of Ukraine in 2010. In Russian propaganda, "Banderites" has effectively served as a synonym for Euromaidan activists, and more broadly for any Ukrainians who support more Ukrainian sovereignty vis-à-vis Russia.

== OUN-B ==
The Organization of Ukrainian Nationalists (OUN) was a Ukrainian nationalist organisation founded in 1929 in Vienna. Bandera joined it that year, and quickly climbed through the ranks, becoming the second in command of OUN in Galicia in 1932–1933, and the head of the OUN national executive in Galicia in June 1933.

The OUN carried out the June 1934 assassination of Bronisław Pieracki, Poland's Minister of the Interior. The then 25-year-old Bandera provided the assassin with the murder weapon, a 7.65 mm calibre pistol. His subsequent arrest and conviction turned Bandera into an instant legend among the militant Ukrainian nationalists of the Second Polish Republic. He was tried and sentenced to death, but the sentence was commuted to life imprisonment.

During his five years in prison, Bandera was "to some extent detached from OUN discourses" but not completely isolated from the global political debates of the late 1930s thanks to Ukrainian and other newspaper subscriptions delivered to his cell.

Bandera escaped from Polish prison after the German invasion in September 1939 and moved to Kraków, the capital of General Government in the Nazi German-occupied zone of Poland, where he established close connections with the German military. Since August 1939, the OUN had been led by Andriy Melnyk, a founding member. He had been chosen for his more moderate and pragmatic stance with his supporters favouring Vyacheslav Lypynsky's conservatism and admiring Mussolini's fascism but publicly distancing themselves from Dmytro Dontsov's contemporary writings, which were by the late 1930s significantly influenced by Nazism. However, a younger and more radical faction of the OUN heavily influenced by Dontsov's works were dissatisfied, leading Bandera to make a challenge to Melnyk in February 1940 by setting up a 'Revolutionary Leadership' (OUN-R) in Kraków. At a congress of the OUN-R leadership in Kraków on 10 February 1941, the radical contingent refused to accept Melnyk's leadership and named Bandera as providnyk (leader) of the OUN, finalizing the fracturing of the organization in the spring of that year into two groups: OUN-B (Banderites or Banderivtsi), who were more militant, younger and supported Bandera, and OUN-M (Melnykites), who were generally older and more ideological.

After the start of the Axis invasion of the Soviet Union on 22 June 1941 (Operation Barbarossa), Yaroslav Stetsko, an OUN-B leader in occupied Lviv, declared an independent Ukrainian state on 30 June 1941, although the region was under the control of Nazi Germany, pledging to work closely with Germany, which was presented as freeing Ukrainians from Russian oppression. In response to Stetsko's declaration, the Nazi authorities suppressed the OUN leadership. In July 1941, Bandera himself was arrested and sent to Sachsenhausen concentration camp in Germany. He was imprisoned there until 1944.

The vast majority of anti-Jewish pogroms carried out by the Banderites occurred in Eastern Galicia and Volhynia, but also in Bukovina. The most deadly of them was perpetrated in the city of Lviv by the people's militia formed by OUN at the moment of the German arrival in the Soviet-occupied eastern Poland. There were two Lviv pogroms, carried out in a one-month span, both lasting for several days; the first one from 30 June to 2 July 1941, and the second one from 25 to 29 July 1941. The first pogrom took the lives of at least 4,000 Jews.

In October 1942, during Bandera's imprisonment, the OUN-B established the Ukrainian Insurgent Army (UPA). The OUN-B formed Ukrainian militias that carried out pogroms and massacres, both independently and with support from the Germans. The OUN-B spread antisemitic and racist propaganda among the ordinary peasants and other Ukrainians.

In late 1944, Bandera was released by the German authorities and allowed to return to Ukraine in the hope that his partisans would unite with OUN-M and harass the Soviet troops, which by that time had handed the Germans major defeats. Germany sought to cooperate with the OUN and other Ukrainian leaders. According to Richard Breitman and Norman Goda in Hitler's Shadow, Bandera and Stetsko refused to do this, and in December 1944 they fled Berlin, heading south. (Note: From page 76: Berlin hoped to form a Ukrainian National Committee with both OUN factions and other Ukrainian leaders. The Committee was formed in November, but Bandera and Stetsko refused to cooperate. They escaped from Berlin in December and fled south, emerging after the war in Munich.)

In February 1945, at a conference of the OUN-B in Vienna, Bandera was made the representative of the leadership of the Foreign Units of the OUN (Zakordonni Chastyny OUN or ZCh OUN). At a February meeting of the OUN in Ukraine, Bandera was re-elected as leader of the whole OUN-B. It was decided by the leadership that Bandera would not come back to Ukraine, but remain abroad and make propaganda for the cause of the OUN-B. Roman Shukhevych resigned as the leader of the OUN-B, and became the leader of OUN-B in Ukraine.

=== Post-WWII ===
In the aftermath of the war, the OUN-B joined the Central Representation of the Ukrainian Emigration in Germany (TsPUEN), a pluralistic grouping of Ukrainian nationalist movements that included the OUN-M, the Hetmanate movement, and the UNDO, though the OUN-B was the largest of these with 5,000 members in West Germany. The TsPUEN sought to gain recognition from the Western Allies of a Ukrainian nationality, though the OUN-B subsequently engaged in an uncompromising exclusivist effort whereby it gained power in the self-administration of most of the Ukrainian displaced persons (DP) camps, especially those in the British occupation zone. (Note: The Western Allies didn't officially recognise a Ukrainian nationality for fear of agitating the USSR, designating Ukrainians in the camps as 'stateless', 'undetermined', or 'others'. Historian Jan-Hinnerk Antons asserts that they created purely Ukrainian DP camps due to the number of conflicts arising between Ukrainians and Poles and the fear that remaining mixed would hurt general repatriation efforts.) According to historian Jan-Hinnerk Antons, this was due to the demographics of the OUN-B's mainly working class and peasant base and the concentration of intellectuals in Ukrainian DP camps in the American occupation zone. Until the practice was halted in 1946, OUN-B networks assisted Ukrainian displaced persons in evading forced repatriation to the Soviet Union. As well as holding official positions, the Banderites ruled the DP communities they held influence in with a strategy of clandestine intimidation, violence, and coercive taxation, which the head of an anti-Banderite DP organisation characterised in an appeal to British military officials as a 'terror regime', and regularly honoured its prewar martyrs.

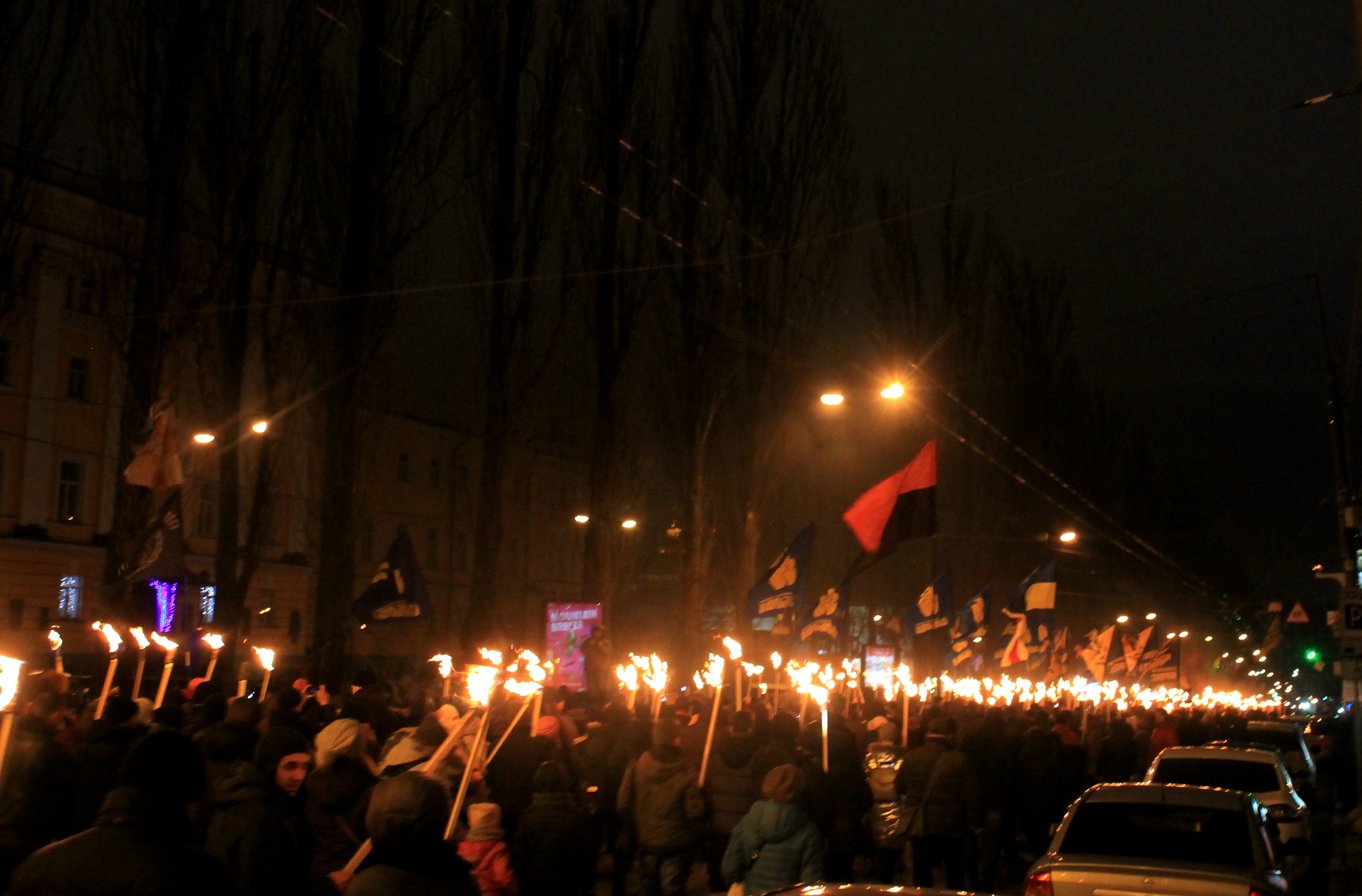
Torchlight procession in honor of the birthday of Stepan Bandera (Kyiv, 1 January 2018).

According to political scientist and historian Georgiy Kasianov, during perestroika in the late 1980s nationalist émigré groups exported a cultural memory to Soviet Ukraine of the OUN as 'freedom fighters against two totalitarian regimes' whereby activists advocated for the rehabilitation and ennobling of Bandera, the OUN-B, and the UPA, leading to the proliferation of memory politics in independent Ukraine. Myroslav Yurkevich, of the Canadian Institute of Ukrainian Studies, wrote in the third volume of the Encyclopedia of Ukraine published in 1993: "The power and influence of the OUN factions have been declining steadily, because of assimilatory pressures, ideological incompatibility with the Western liberal-democratic ethos, and the increasing tendency of political groups in Ukraine to move away from integral nationalism." After Ukraine's independence in 1991, the OUN-B created 'façade structures' such as the Congress of Ukrainian Nationalists party (KUN), the Youth Nationalist Congress (YNC), and the Center for Research of the Liberation Movement (TsDVR).

Set up in 2002, the TsDVR became one of the most prominent proponents of 'memory activism' with director of the TsDVR (2002–2010) Volodymyr Viatrovych becoming the head of the archival department of the Security Service of Ukraine (SBU) in 2008, before being dismissed in 2010. In 2014, Viatrovych was appointed director of the Ukrainian Institute of National Memory (UINP) by the first Yatsenyuk government. When asked by historian Alexander J. Motyl whether he identified as a Banderite, Viatrovych noted the Soviet propaganda use of the term and stressed that he did not identify with interwar Ukrainian nationalism. Amid growing controversy around his work and protestations from Western and Ukrainian historians, (Note: Motyl asserts that Viatrovych occupied a middle ground between nationalist and Soviet-era revisionists.) Viatrovych was dismissed in 2019 by the Cabinet of Ministers shortly after the inauguration of Volodymyr Zelenskyy as president. His replacement, Anton Drobovych, asserted the need to restore balance to the UINP's memory policy and prevent it from "being perceived as a mouthpiece for agitation, ideological struggle, or propaganda". Kasianov argues that this episode and others, seized upon by Russian propaganda, contributed to the pretexts that Vladimir Putin used to justify his full-scale invasion of Ukraine in February 2022 in spite of the lack of popularity of these forces. In November 2018, the KUN, together with Right Sector, C14, and the OUN-M under Bohdan Chervak, endorsed Svoboda deputy leader Ruslan Koshulynskyi in the 2019 Ukrainian presidential election. Koshulynskyi later received 1.6% of the votes.

== As an insult ==
In Soviet secret records, the word "Banderites" for the first time emerged in late 1940 and began to be used in Soviet propaganda starting in late 1942. The term became a crucial element of the Soviet propaganda discourse and was used as a pejorative description of Ukrainians, sometimes all western Ukrainians in the most negative way. Historian Andrii Portnov noted that "The common noun 'Banderivtsi' ('Banderites') emerged around the time of ethnic cleansing of the Polish population in Volhynia, and it was used to designate all Ukrainian nationalists, but also, on occasion, western Ukrainians or even any person who spoke Ukrainian."

The term has been used by Russian state media against Euromaidan activists to associate a separate Ukrainian national identity with the most radical nationalists. Today, in Russian propaganda, the word is used to refer to all in Ukraine who back the idea of sovereignty from Russia, emphasizing Ukrainian nationalist collaboration with Nazi Germany.

=== Yid-Banderite ===
Yaroslav Hrytsak argues that the term 'Yid-Banderite' (zhydobanderivtsi) has principally been used as a slur, tracing its heritage as far back as 1907–1909 to the usage of zhydomazepynets (Yid-Mazepists). References to Yid-Banderites became part of the Fofudja internet meme where the term was used ironically to mock Ukrainophobia and Great Russian chauvinism. In the aftermath of the Revolution of Dignity, the term saw usage, for the most part, as a way for Ukrainian Jews to identify themselves with Ukrainian nationalists, express support for Ukrainian sovereignty, and mock people who accused the new government of antisemitism. Since 2014, Yid-Banderite has seen use as a slur, ironically, and sometimes as a marker of proud self-identification.

In July 2023, a digitally-altered image went viral of Jewish Ukrainian oligarch Ihor Kolomoyskyi wearing a T-shirt in the UPA's red and black colours with the phrase "Yid-Banderite" below a Ukrainian tryzub altered to have 4 additional prongs (making it resemble a Jewish menorah).

== See also ==
- Hiwi (volunteer)
- Trawniki men
