= Leiba Dobrovskii =

Leyba-Itzko Dobrovsky or Dobrovskii (Лейба Іцик Добровський; 1910–1969) was a Jewish Ukrainian soldier of the Soviet Red Army who was captured prisoner and hid his ethnic identity to survive the Holocaust.

== Early life and education ==
Dobrovskii was born in 1910 in Olshanitsa of the Rokitnyansky district in the Kiev region to parents Josip and Perl. He went on to graduate from the Law Faculty of the Kiev State University and was accepted into the Communist Party of Ukraine, with membership No. 24170.

== War combat ==
Dobrovskii was drafted for military service on 22 June 1941, in the 5th Army, as soon as Nazi Germany invaded, and was sent to the Railway District's Military Committee of the city of Kiev assigned to work there as administrative clerk at one of the evacuation points.

In the first days and weeks of the German invasion, the 5th Army fought against forces from the German Army Group South, defending areas leading to Lutsk. The 5th Army suffered defeats and heavy losses, retreating to Poltava. On 20 September 1941, the remnants of the army were surrounded by the Germans and their commander was seriously wounded and captured. Dobrovskii was among those taken prisoner but managed to escape from captivity. In subsequently discovered Soviet documents, he was listed as having "disappeared" by October 1941.

== Ukrainian nationalist forces ==
The accounts about Dobrovskii's actions after his escape differ among historians. In the 21st century, Ukrainian historian Volodymyr Viatrovych described Dobrovskii as a Jew who fought alongside the Ukrainian Insurgent Army (UPA) against the Nazis and the Soviets. An account by Dobrovskii's alleged niece, living in Israel, ostensibly confirmed the Viatrovych version of events, in which Dobrovskii worked for the Ukrainians openly as a Jew and published pamphlets inviting people living in the country of all ethnic backgrounds to join in the struggle of the UPA. Viatrovych presented the case of Leiba Dobrovskii, who he said rose to become political advisor to a UPA commander while openly being Jewish, and published leaflets about "the [peaceful] coexistence of Jews and Ukrainians for thousands of years", as evidence of the lies of "[Soviet propaganda] allegations of anti-Semitism [within] the Ukrainian national liberation movement". Viatrovych also described the participation of Ukrainians from Bukovina in the extermination of Jews in Babi Yar as a "Soviet myth". The BBC subsidiary in Ukraine supported this version of events.

Historian Jared McBride, in a 2017 Haaretz article, dismissed the "myth of Jews happily serving with Ukrainian nationalists," which grew, as he said, after the Orange Revolution and historian Viatrovych's increased prominence within the Ukrainian government wherefrom he promoted the Dobrovskii "legend". According to McBride, the escaped prisoner Dobrovskii went to north-western Ukraine, where he accidentally met local Ukrainian nationalists "connected to the local collaborationist police and administration", including the local mayor and later UPA member, Mykola Kryzhanovskii. McBride notes that Kryzhanovskii was "well-known for his brutality towards Jews", but the nationalists, not suspecting that Dobrovskii was Jewish, recruited him to produce propaganda on account of his education. Dobrovskii concealed his Jewishness and, moreover, was "not an enthusiastic supporter of Ukrainian nationalism". The basis for McBride's version of events is Dobrovskii's arrest file kept in the Security Service of Ukraine archives, which was presented publicly in 2008 as part of an exhibition organized by the Ukrainian Institute of National Remembrance, with the assistance of Viatrovych himself.

== Implications ==
The case of Leiba Dobrovskii has been presented as evidence of the Ukrainian nationalist forces' alleged lack of antisemitism. A similar argument was made with the case of an alleged Jewish UPA fighter named Stella Krenzbach, whose ostensible memoirs were first published in the Ukrainian diaspora in 1954 and in Ukraine in 1993. Historian John-Paul Himka, in 2011, dismissed the Krenzbach "legend" as a fabrication of UPA and the Organization of Ukrainian Nationalists and their promoters, who, he stated, "have to resort to falsifications to defend their innocence vis-à-vis the Holocaust."

== See also ==
- Mizocz Ghetto
- Reichskommissariat Ukraine
- Ukrainian nationalism
- Stella Krenzbach
