= Alina Shpak =

Ukrainian archivist

Alina Volodymyrivna Shpak
- Born: 24 December 1980 (age 45); Lutsk, Ukrainian SSR, USSR
- Education: Lesya Ukrainka Volyn National University
- Occupation: Archivist

Alina Volodymyrivna Shpak (born 24 December 1980, Lutsk) is a Ukrainian archivist. From 18 September 2019 to 11 December 2019 she was acting director of the Ukrainian Institute of National Memory. She is a leader in Decommunization in Ukraine.

== Life and work ==
Shpak graduated with a master's degree from the philological faculty of Lesya Ukrainka Volyn National University, majoring in English language and literature.

In 2002, she cofounded with Igor Guz and Igor Kulik, the Volyn regional organization "Youth Nationalist Congress."

In 2006–2008 she worked in the Lutsk City Council, was the head of the Department of International Cooperation.

In 2008–2010, she worked as a consultant, to the Security Service of Ukraine. At the invitation of Volodymyr Viatrovych, she was deputy director of the Department of Archival Support. She is First Deputy Head of the Secretariat of the Commissioner for the Protection of the State Language.

From 18 September 2019 to 11 December 2019, after the dismissal of Viatrovich, she performed the duties of the head of the Ukrainian National Labor Organization. On 19 February 2020, she was dismissed from the post of first deputy head of the Ukrainian Institute of National Remembrance.

On 31 August 2020, she was appointed the first deputy head of the Secretariat of the Commissioner for the Protection of the State Language.

== Personal life ==
Her parents are Volodymyr Markovych Shpak, born in 1952 and a resident of Lutsk and psychology teacher at VSU, and Alla Dmytrivna Shpak, born in 1959, from Lutsk.

Her brother is Vitaliy Volodymyrovych Shpak, born in 1986 in Lutsk. He was the chairman of the local council of the Lutsk township of the Ukrainian national scout organization "Plast" in 2005-2007. In 2007-2010, he held the position of chairman of the Kraiova Plastova Eldership, and in 2010-2012 he headed the Kyiv office of UCU. He moved to the United States in 2012.
