= Stella Krenzbach =

Possibly fictional person

Stella Krenzbach (alternatively Kreutzbach or Krentsbakh,) is a fictitious person, ostensibly a Jewish-Ukrainian member of the Organization of Ukrainian Nationalists (OUN) during World War II.

== Accounts of a life ==
In 1957, the war memoir of a "Stella Krentsbach", circulated in a collection edited by Ukrainian writer Petro Mirchuk. The text began: "The reason that I'm alive today and can devote all of my energy to the state of Israel is thanks only to God and the Ukrainian Insurgent Army." The memoir author writes that she was born in Bolekhiv, near Lwów, the daughter of a rabbi, and she was a childhood friend of Olya, the daughter of a Greek Catholic priest. According to the memoir, she graduated from the Philosophy department of the University of Lviv in 1939. When the war broke out, she joined the Ukrainian Insurgent Army (UPA), where she served as a nurse and an intelligence officer. In the spring of 1945, with the Soviet forces having recaptured the whole of (current) Ukraine, the NKVD allegedly arrested her during a meeting she had with a contact in Rozhniativ. She was jailed and sentenced to death, but UPA fighters managed to free her. In the summer of 1945, she crossed the Carpathians with other Ukrainian insurgents. On 1 October, she reached the English zone of occupation in Austria, from where she traveled to Israel. In her new country, she worked in the Ministry of Foreign Affairs.

== Resonance ==
The story of "Stella Krentsbakh" received significant attention in the Ukrainian diaspora press. Journalists attempted to locate her in Israel, but she could not be found. Stories and rumors started circulating in émigré circles that the woman had been murdered in Israel, supposedly for telling the truth about the UPA's attitude to the Jews.

Historian Filip Friedman, a survivor of the Holocaust from Western Ukraine, remarked that "the only data about her was published in an Organization of Ukrainian Nationalists paper." He searched through The Washington Post of that period and could not find the memoirs, as he wrote. After making an inquiry to Israel's Ministry of Foreign Affairs, he received the reply, as he reported, that they never had an employee there by that name and also that a case of a homicide in Israel with a victim by that name was "entirely unknown". Friedman stated he undertook a "careful analysis of the text" of the memoir and the examination led him to the conclusion that "the entire story is a hoax".

Bohdan Kordiuk, one-time leader of the Home Executive of UPA, repudiated in the newspaper Suchasna Ukraina (Contemporary Ukraine), issue no. 15/194, 20 July 1958, the memoirs as fake, soon after their original publication. Kordiuk wrote that "none of the UPA men known to the author of these lines knows the legendary Stella Krenzbach or have heard of her. The Jews do not know her either. It is unlikely that anyone of the tens of thousands of Ukrainian refugees after the war met Stella Krenzbach." He concluded: "It seems to us that until there are proper proofs, the story of Dr. Stella Krenzbach has to be regarded as a mythification."

== Historiography ==
Both supporters and deniers of the veracity of the "Stella Krenzbach" life story have accused the other side of propaganda. Historian Grzegorz Rossoliński-Liebe denoted the 1957 memoir as fake and as being part of the "memory narrative in which Ukrainians appeared as heroes and victims, but not as perpetrators", a narrative that, as he stated, was "from a political perspective, advantageous to the nationalist factions of the Ukrainian diaspora during the Cold War". Historian John-Paul Himka stated that the "Stella Krentsbakh/Kreutzbach forged biography" shows that the OUN, the UPA, and their "promoters" have to "resort to falsifications to defend their innocence vis-à-vis the Holocaust", which "indicates that they lack real evidence [in] their possession [about the alleged Jewish element among the nationalist organizations]", and concluded that "no one grabs for fig leaves when they are wearing clothes". Historian Jared McBride compared "Stella Krenzbach" to that of Leiba Dobrovskii, an attempt to whitewash antisemitism in the history of Ukrainian nationalism, as "not the first time that nationalist activists have spread a fake narrative about Jews and nationalists" and described her as "a fictitious Jewess who, according to her 'autobiography', forged by a nationalist propagandist in the 1950s, thanked 'God and the Ukrainian Insurgent Army" for having survived the war and the Holocaust.'"

Ukrainian historian Volodymyr Viatrovych of the Ukrainian Institute of National Memory has repeatedly proclaimed the veracity and accuracy of the Krenzbach life story, as related in the published text, attributing the denials to those who "accuse the OUN" of having been "anti-Semitic".

== See also ==
- Leiba Dobrovskii
- Jewish–Ukrainian relations in Eastern Galicia
- Nachtigall Battalion
