= Varshavska (Kyiv Metro) =

Metro station in Kyiv, Ukraine

General information
- Coordinates: 50°30′14.5″N 30°25′45″E
- System: Kyiv Metro Station
- Owner: Kyiv Metro
- Line: Syretsko–Pecherska line
- Platforms: 2
- Tracks: 2

Construction
- Structure type: Underground
- Depth: 15

History
- Opened: Under construction

Services
Preceding station	Kyiv Metro	Following station
Terminus	Syretsko–Pecherska line	Mostytska towards Chervonyi Khutir
Location

Varshavska (Ukrainian: Варшавська), formerly known as Prospekt Pravdy (Ukrainian: Проспект Правди), is a station currently under construction on the Kyiv Metro's Syretsko–Pecherska Line. This station is a part of the extension to Vynohradar. It has been under construction since 2021.

== History ==
In November 2018 Kyiv Metro signed a contract to build the Mostytska and Prospekt Pravdy subway stations and a branch line toward the Vynohradar station; the deadline for completion was set for 2021. In August 2020 Kyiv mayor Vitali Klitschko promised to complete construction of the two new metro stations by the end of 2021. On 1 February 2021 he stated that they will be opened by the summer of 2021. On 8 July 2021 Kyiv Metro stated that the construction of the new metro stations Mostytska and Prospekt Pravdy was on schedule would open by the end of 2021. It was added that the city and the subway required the contractor to meet construction deadlines and complete all planned works on time (as planned - by the end of 2021), unless the Chamber of Commerce agreed on the existence of force majeure that would slow down the works. Early September 2021 the Chamber of Commerce agreed there was such and the expiration of the contract with the Kyiv Metro was to be postponed from November 2021 to May 2023. On 18 May 2023 Mayor Klitschko stated that the construction of metro in Vynohradar was continuing, during the Russian invasion of Ukraine ongoing since 24 February 2022. On the same day the future metro station Prospekt Pravdy was, by the Kyiv City Council, renamed to Varshavska (as part of a derussification campaign following the 2022 Russian invasion of Ukraine). In December 2023, Kyiv Metro terminated the contract with Kyivmetrobud due to failure to meet the deadline. Due to this, Kyivmetrobud had to return 4 billion hryvnias to the metro. On 17 June 2024, Autostrada became the only participant of the new tender for the construction. On 8 November 2024, the construction of the first phase of the metro to Vynohradar has resumed.
