= On the Condemnation and Prohibition of Propaganda of Russian Imperial Policy in Ukraine and the Decolonization of Toponymy =

2023 Ukrainian legislation

- Coat of arms of Ukraine

Verkhovna Rada
- Territorial extent: Ukraine
- Passed: 21 March 2023
- Enacted: 21 April 2023
- Holding: Text of Legislation
- Effective: 27 July 2023

Legislative history
- Introduced by: Denys Shmyhal
- Introduced: 5 April 2022
- Voting summary: 248 voted for; 1 voted against; 71 abstained
- Status: Current legislation

The Law of Ukraine "On the Condemnation and Prohibition of Propaganda of Russian Imperial Policy in Ukraine and the Decolonization of Toponymy" (Ukrainian: Закон України «Про засудження та заборону пропаганди російської імперської політики в Україні і деколонізацію топонімії) is a piece of Ukrainian legislation, passed by the Verkhovna Rada of Ukraine on 21 March 2023.

The law has been widely described as providing a legal framework for the process of the derussification and decolonization of Ukraine, which officially began after the collapse of the Soviet Union in 1991 and considerably intensified after the Russian invasion of Ukraine in 2022.

== Background ==
The Russian invasion of Ukraine that began in 2022 has increased the rate of derussification in Ukraine, especially the removal of names associated with Russia and Russian imperialism. Ukrainian advocates for the process refer to it as decolonization. Street names associated with Russia were changed in major Ukrainian cities like Lviv, Dnipro, Kyiv, and Kharkiv. Ivano-Frankivsk became the first city to remove all its Russian toponyms altogether.

== History ==
On 5 April 2022, the Verkhovna Rada registered a draft law of an amendment to Ukraine's laws regarding the decolonization of toponymy and regulating the use of geographic names of populated places. On 12 April 2022, Oleksiy Danilov, the secretary of the National Security and Defense Council of Ukraine, said that the total derussification of many spheres of Ukrainian society was inevitable, claiming "we won't have anything Russian left here".

On 14 March 2023, several public organizations signed a petition calling on the Verkhovna Rada to adopt a law on decolonization in parliament. On 21 March 2023, the Verkhovna Rada of Ukraine adopted the law. It passed with 248 votes for, 1 against, and 71 abstaining. On 21 April 2023, Ukrainian president Volodymyr Zelenskyy signed the law. On 27 July 2023, the law entered into force.

== Contents and implementation ==
The law prohibits "publicly honoring and promoting names with symbols of Russian imperial policy, its landmarks, memorable, historical, and cultural places, settlements, dates, events, and representatives." The law requires that as of 27 January 2024, all toponyms related to the Russian Empire, the Soviet Union, or the Russian Federation be removed from places in Ukraine.

The law provides a list of steps to be taken by local authorities in the process. Local councils are instructed to form a commission, of whom at least half are members of the public (activists and academics), then collect and process proposals for new names. The commissions will be required to communicate with citizens about the new toponyms, which "will allow choosing the most appropriate version of the name that will meet the request of residents or the historical features of the area". Documents like birth certificates and real estate are not required to be updated to match new names. The law also requires that toponyms that have been Russified in the past must be brought in line with Ukrainian spelling, listing Yuzhne, Sievierodonetsk, and Yuzhnoukrainsk as examples.

In addition to toponyms, imperial monuments are also to be removed from public spaces. Types of monuments to be removed include those "dedicated to persons who held senior positions in government and administrative bodies, political organisations, parties, armed formations of State entities of Russia and who participated in or contributed to the implementation of Russian imperial policy", as well as those "dedicated to individuals who publicly supported, glorified or justified Russian imperial policies, called for Russification or Ukrainophobia."

On 20 November 2023, the Ukrainian Institute of National Memory prepared a collection of recommendations and documents regarding how the requirements of the law would be carried out. It lists examples of imperialistic toponyms, such as:

- The village Kniaze-Hryhorivka (now Kozatska Sloboda), whose name literally meant "Prince Grigory", in reference to the Imperial Russian statesman Grigory Potemkin
- The village Suvorovske (now Podilske), formerly named in honor of Imperial Russian general Alexander Suvorov

The collection also relays requirements for the selection of new names. Among other restrictions, new names are not allowed for living people, should be easy to pronounce, and should ideally reflect long-standing historical names of localities.

== See also ==
- Ukrainian decommunization laws
- List of Ukrainian placenames affected by decommunization
- Naming Commission, an American government commission tasked with recommending renamings of American military objects with names related to the Confederacy
- Law of Ukraine "On the Protection of the Constitutional Order in the Field of Activities of Religious Organizations"
