= Decolonization in Ukraine =

Processes of decolonization in Ukraine began during the dissolution of the Soviet Union and accelerated during the Revolution of Dignity, the Russo-Ukrainian War and especially the Russian invasion of Ukraine.

The term as used by the people of Ukraine is generally collective, encompassing both decommunization and derussification in the country.

During the war, the main component of Ukraine's politics of memory is decolonization, as a continuation of decommunization, which began in 2015, and deRussification, which was launched by some local authorities and right-wing activists after the Russian invasion. Decolonization of memory involves the removal of symbols from the public space, including names and memorial signs that are viewed as markers of Russian imperial policy. Ukraine aims to distance itself from the influence of Russian historiography, create its own national historical narrative, and develop politics of memory connected with the European tradition only. The intended outcome of decolonization is to sever the cultural and historical ties between Ukraine and Russia, thereby impede anyone from considering Ukrainians and Russians as "brotherly nations", especially the younger generations.

Implementation of the decolonisation politics involves several components:

- Legislative regulation of historical memory. It has been legally implemented through four Ukrainian decommunization laws, as well as the 2023 law "On the Condemnation and Prohibition of Propaganda of Russian Imperial Policy in Ukraine and the Decolonization of Toponymy".
- Destruction of monuments, renaming of toponyms (as part of decommunization and derussification). Following the full-scale invasion, monuments and toponyms associated with Russia and the USSR began to be perceived as markers of the invader, through which the empire "branded" its territory.
- Installation of monuments to the victims of Russian aggression.
- Reevaluation of holidays.
- Modifications in the school history curriculum. The colonial status of Ukraine within the Russian Empire and USSR becomes the central narrative.
- Removal of Russian and Soviet literature from libraries.

== See also ==
- Decolonization in Latino culture
- Russian imperialism
- Russification of Ukraine
- Soviet empire

== Sources ==
- Latysh, Yurii (2023). ""Get away from Moscow!": Main Trends of Ukraine's Politics of Memory during the Russo-Ukrainian War". In Bazhenova, Hanna (ed.). Russia's War in Ukraine: Implications for the Politics of History in Central and Eastern Europe (PDF). Lublin: Instytut Europy Środkowej (Institute of Central Europe). ISBN 978-83-67678-37-7. This article incorporates text from this source, which is available under the CC BY 4.0 license.
