= Olena Kopanchuk =

Ukrainian politician (born 1978)

- Олена Копанчук
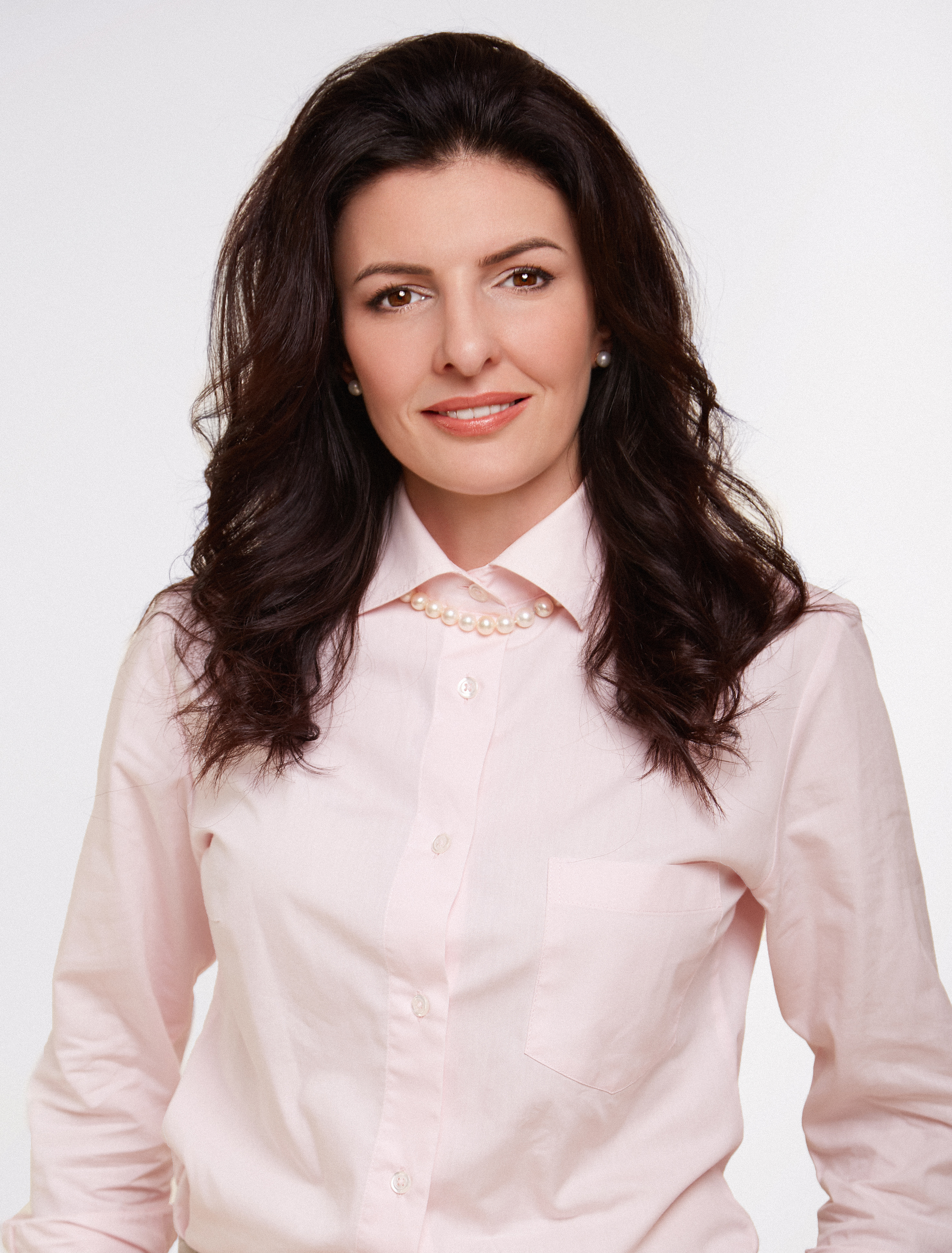
- Kopanchuk in 2019

People's Deputy of Ukraine
- Incumbent
- Assumed office 29 August 2019
- Preceded by: Andriy Shynkovych
- Constituency: Khmelnytskyi Oblast, No. 189

Personal details
- Born: 1 November 1978 (age 47) Lviv, Ukrainian SSR, Soviet Union (now Ukraine)
- Party: Servant of the People

Olena Yevhenivna Kopanchuk (Ukrainian: Олена Євгенівна Копанчук; born 1 November 1978) is a Ukrainian politician currently serving as a People's Deputy of Ukraine from Ukraine's 189th electoral district as a member of Servant of the People since 29 August 2019. She is also chairman of the Verkhovna Rada Budget Committee.

== Biography ==
Kopanchuk was the candidate of Servant of the People in Ukraine's 189th electoral district during the 2019 Ukrainian parliamentary election. She was elected.

Co-chair of the group for interparliamentary relations with the Principality of Monaco.

Kopanchuk has been criticised by the anti-corruption non-governmental organisation Chesno for gross violations of the rules of procedure of the Verkhovna Rada and the Constitution of Ukraine, such as an instance of piano voting instead of Viacheslav Rublyov during the vote on the bill amending the law "On building codes". In connection with the violation of the regulations, as a punishment she promised to give her monthly salary to charitable foundations.
