= Oleksandr Alfiorov =

Ukrainian historian, radio host, public and political figure (born 1983)

- Олександр Анатолійович Алфьоров
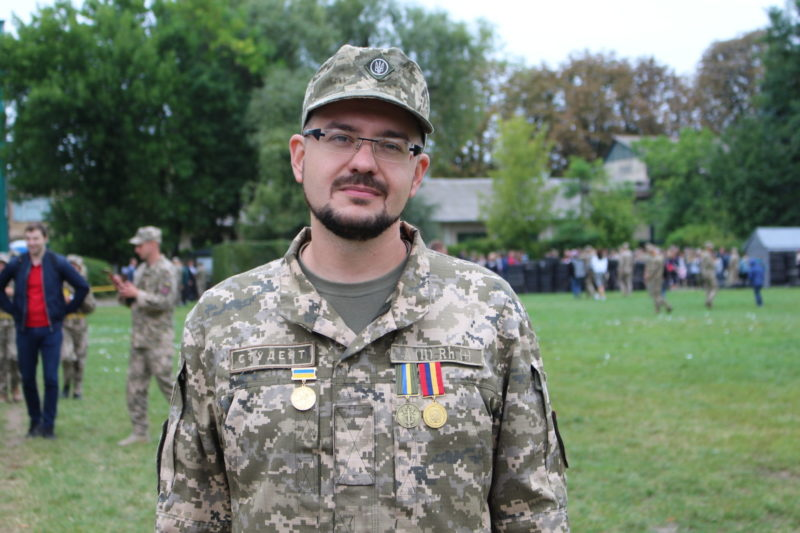
- Alfiorov in 2019
- Born: 30 November 1983 (age 42); Kyiv
- Education: National Pedagogical Drahomanov University
- Occupations: Historian, radio host, public and political figure
- Awards: Order of Merit, 3rd class

Oleksandr Alfiorov or Alfyorov and Alf’orov (Ukrainian: Олександр Анатолійович Алфьоров; born 30 November 1983) is a Ukrainian historian, radio host, public and political figure, Candidate of Historical Sciences, researcher at the Institute of History of Ukraine of the National Academy of Sciences of Ukraine, Head of the Ukrainian Institute of National Memory, Major of the Armed Forces of Ukraine.

== Biography ==
=== Family ===
He comes from the Ukrainian noble family of the Alfiorovs. He was born in Kyiv, in a family of scientists: his father, Anatolii Alfiorov, Candidate of Biological Sciences, worked for a long time with Mykola Amosov; his mother, Yevheniia Alfiorova, is a teacher. He and his wife Tetiana are raising five children.

=== Education ===
In 2001, he graduated from secondary school No. 137 (Kyiv). During his studies at the school, he took an active part in the competition of the Junior Academy of Sciences of Ukraine: he won the all-Ukrainian stage of the Junior Academy of Sciences (2001) in history. In 2006, he graduated with rector's honors from the Institute of Historical Education of the National Pedagogical Drahomanov University with a degree in history and law. In 2012, he defended his PhD thesis in History of Ukraine on the topic "The Role of the Cossack and Yeomanry Holuby Family in the History of Ukraine in the XVI–XVIII Centuries". From 2012 until the beginning of the war, he was a part-time student at the Kyiv Orthodox Theological Academy (2 courses).

=== Career ===
From 2008, he has been working as a radio host at the Ukrainian Radio Culture (from 2012, he has been hosting the author's program "Historical Frescoes"). From 2010, he has been a junior researcher (from 2012, a researcher) at the Institute of History of Ukraine of the National Academy of Sciences of Ukraine.

In 2014–2018, he was the press secretary of the far-right politician, People's Deputy of Ukraine Andrii Biletskyi, and from winter 2014 to June 2015, he was the head of the press service of the Azov Regiment.

From 2019, he has been a TV presenter at the Public Television UA: Culture.

In 2020-2021, he coordinated the Ukrainian chapter of the Princeton University project "Framing the Late Antique and Medieval Economy".

From April 2022, he was an officer of the Azov-Kyiv Special Forces, and from September an officer of the 3rd Assault Brigade, head of the humanitarian training and information support group of the staff psychological support department. He was also the head of the expert group on de-Russification in Kyiv.

In his interview to RBC-Ukraine on 2 February 2024, Alfiorov objected to comparing Vladimir Putin to Adolf Hitler because Hitler "received German education, was an artist, and was brought up on the philosophy and the culture of Germany". He also said that it is impossible to compare the peoples of Nazi Germany and today's Russia because Nazi Germans were "brought up in the spirit of law, obedience, with powerful Christian ethics".

On 27 June 2025, the Cabinet of Ministers of Ukraine appointed Oleksandr Alfiorov as the head of the Ukrainian Institute of National Memory.

== Scientific activity ==
Author of more than 100 scientific articles; author and co-author of books:

- Алфьоров О. Особові печатки правобережної України: кінець XVIII — перша половина XIX ст. — Біла Церква: Вид. О. В. Пшонківський 2004. — 100 с.
- Алфьоров О. А., Однороженко О. А. Українські особові печатки XV—XVII ст. за матеріалами київських архівосховищ. — Харків: Вид. «Просвіта», 2009. — 200 с.
- Алфьоров О. Старшинський рід Алфьорових: генеалогія, соціально-політичне та майнове становище слобідської гілки другої половини XVII — початку ХХ ст. — Біла Церква: Вид. О. В. Пшонківський, 2009. — 150 с.
- «Договори і постанови…» / Упорядник О. Алфьоров. — Київ: Вид. «Темпора» 2010. — 152 с.
- Тисяча років української сфрагістики. Каталог виставки. /у співавторстві/ К.,2014. — 505 с.
- Реєстри Сумського полку. 1660—1664 / Упорядники О. Алфьоров, О. Різниченко. — Київ: Вид. Інституту історії країни НАН України, 2016. — 534 с.
- Реєстри Полтавського полку 1654 р. /Упорядники О. Алфьоров, О. Монькін. — Київ: Вид. Інституту історії країни НАН України, 2018. — 266 с.
- Переписна книга Сумського полку 1691 р. / Упорядники О. Алфьоров, О. Різниченко. — Київ: Вид. Інституту історії країни НАН України, 2019. — 635 с.
- Михайло Чайковський. Шляхта обирає авантюризм / упорядник О.Алфьоров. — Київ: Вид.: Пропала грамота, 2020. — 608 с.
- Алфьоров О., Різніченко О. Переписна книга Білопільської сотні 1673 року. — Київ-Білопілля, 2021. — 219 с.
- Алфьоров О. Особові печатки з Правобережної України: середина XVII — початок ХІХ ст. Матеріали до каталогу. — Київ, 2021. — 210 с.
- Алфьоров О. Печатки Київської митрополії XI—XIV ст.: клір та інституції. Каталог колекції Музею Шереметьєвих. — Київ: Видавничий дім «Антиквар», 2021. — 240 с[5].
- Присяга козацьких полків, що були у поході 1718 року / Упорядники О. Алфьоров, О. Різниченко. — Запоріжжя, 2023. - 200 с.
- Переписна книга Сумського полку 1691 р. / Упорядники О. Алфьоров, О. Різниченко. — Запоріжжя, 2024. - 528 с.
- Seibt W., Alf'orov O. Byzantine Seals and Rus’ian Seals in the Byzantine Style Found on the Territory of Ukraine. - Kyiv, 2024. - 418 p.
- Відповідальний секретар наукових збірників «Сфрагістичний щорічник» (Вип. 1-5), «Спеціальні історичні дисципліни: питання теорії та методики» (Вип. 25-26).
- Алфьоров О. , Петраускас А. ГОРОДНИЦЬКИЙ СКАРБ: СРІБНИКИ ВОЛОДИМИРА СВЯТОСЛАВИЧА // Український нумізматичний щорічник. — 2021. — № 5. — C. 25.

=== Contribution to the development of science ===
- In 2009, he found a copy of the "Constitution of Pylyp Orlyk" in the Russian State Archives of Ancient Documents (Moscow).
- In 2010–2017, he co-organized 7 international sfragist conferences.
- 2017 – Curator and author of the exhibition "Sviatoslav I: The Spirit of the Age" (Golden Gate Museum of the National Reserve "Sophia of Kyiv").
- 2018 - Founder of the "Historical Radio".
- In 2020, he discovered the previously unknown Metropolitan Nikephoros III of Kyiv, who ranks between Metropolitans Kirill III (1247–1281) and Maximos (1285–1305). Judging by the inscription on the seal, which was first presented at an international conference on the history of Kievan Rus' in Warsaw on 2 February 2020, Nikephoros III was metropolitan for just over a year. Or perhaps he died on the road, because his seal (from the collection of O. Sheremetiev) was found in Chersonesus (Sevastopol).
- 2020 – took part in the transfer of the Horodnytsia treasure to the state.
- Author of the coat of arms of Cherniakhiv Raion, Zhytomyr Oblast.

== Public and political activities ==
In 2001–2007, he was the head of the youth branch of the Union of Hetman Statesmen. Member of the Ukrainian Heraldry Society.

From 2016 – member of the Supreme Council of the National Corps political party, party spokesperson. From 2018, he is the head of the all-Ukrainian campaign "Memory of the Nation".

Head of the expert toponymic commission for processing proposals for renaming the objects of city subordination, the names of which are associated with the Russian Federation and/or its allies (satellites) at the Kyiv City State Administration.

Since 2019, he became an author of the popular science YouTube channel Oleksandr Alfiorov. His first video he published was about the Kyiv neighborhood Mysholovka. The next few videos were mostly about the local Kyiv history and its landmarks. Eventually he expanded his videos to other historical subjects.

Alfiorov serves as head of the expert group on Derussification in Kyiv. Among his proposals on this post is the replacement of Mykola Shchors monument with a statue of Symon Petliura and the installment of a monument to Pavlo Skoropadskyi on the site of the former Lenin monument in Bessarabska Square.

== Awards ==
- Order of Merit, 3rd class (6 June 2025)
- Presidential Award "For Participation in the Anti-Terrorist Operation" (2015)
- Dmytro Nytchenko Prize (2022)
- Medal for Sacrifice and Love for Ukraine of the Ukrainian Orthodox Church – Kyiv Patriarchate.
- Numerous commendations from the Ukrainian Museum in Chicago, the Ministry of Culture and Strategic Communications, the Junior Academy of Sciences of Ukraine, etc.
