= VNU =

VNU may refer to:

- Verenigde Nederlandse Uitgeverijen, a Dutch publishing company
- Vietnam National University, Hanoi (VNU), a public university system in Hanoi, Vietnam
- Vietnam National University, Ho Chi Minh City (VNU-HCM), a public university system in Ho Chi Minh City, Vietnam
- Lesya Ukrainka Volyn National University, a university in Lutsk, Ukraine
