= Derussification in Ukraine =

Removal of Russian influence in Ukraine

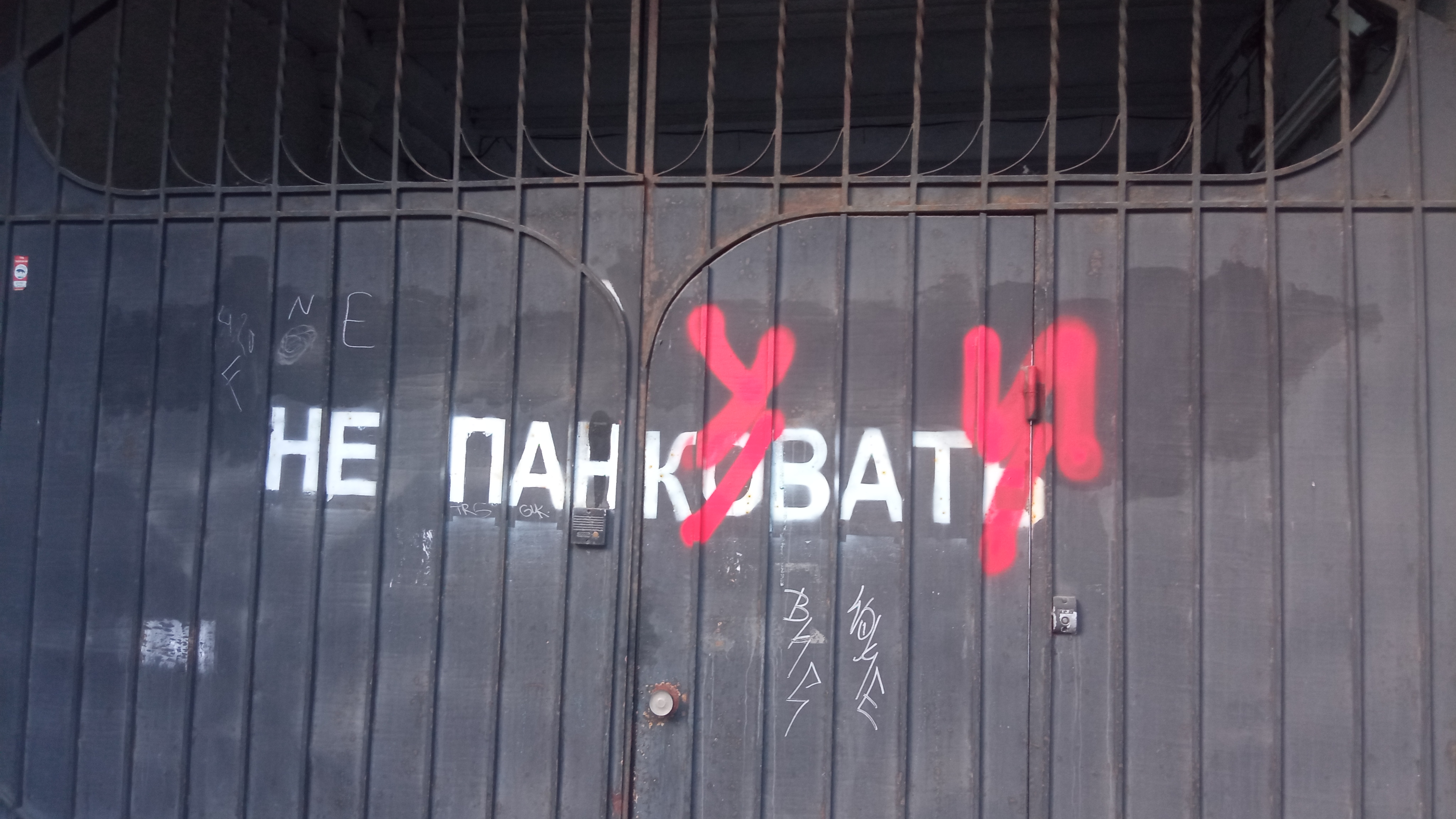
Change in a graffiti in Kyiv from Russian to Ukrainian spelling of a pun. The original Russian "не парковать" ("do not park") was first changed to не панковать ("do not punk", meaning "do not mess around"), later changed to Ukrainian "не панкувати".

Derussification in Ukraine (Ukrainian: Дерусифікація/деросіянізація в Україні, romanized: Derusyfikatsiia/derosiianizatsiia v Ukraïni) is a process of removing Russian influence from the post-Soviet country of Ukraine. This derussification started after the collapse of the Soviet Union in 1991 and intensified with the demolition of monuments to Lenin during Euromaidan in 2014 and the further systemic process of decommunization in Ukraine. The Russo-Ukrainian War gave a strong impetus to the process. Along with decommunization, derussification has been described as one of the components of a larger process of decolonization in Ukraine.

The process manifests itself in the renaming of toponyms named after Russian statesmen and cultural figures, or those that are believed to reflect Russianism and the Russian worldview, or are otherwise associated with Russia. Also part of the process is the dismantling of objects of the Russian rule (e.g., plaques, signs, monuments, busts, and panels). As of 8 April 2022, according to a poll by the sociological group Rating, 76% of Ukrainians support the initiative to rename streets and other objects whose names are associated with Russia.

In March 2023, the Ukrainian parliament passed the Law of Ukraine "On the Condemnation and Prohibition of Propaganda of Russian Imperial Policy in Ukraine and the Decolonization of Toponymy", which forbade toponymy associated with Russia. On 21 April 2023, President Volodymyr Zelenskyy signed the law. This law prohibits toponymy that symbolizes or glorifies Russia, individuals who carried out aggression against Ukraine (or another country), as well as totalitarian policies and practices related to the Russian Empire and the Soviet Union, including Ukrainians living in Russian-occupied territories. A series of toponyms have already been renamed based on this law.

== History ==
The process began with the collapse of the Soviet Union, but since the issue of decommunization was a much bigger problem, derussification received relatively little attention. After 2014, the two processes were closely intertwined and initially they took place mostly in a spontaneous and unsystematic way. As the decommunization process in Ukraine had almost been completed by 2022, the derussification process intensified after the Russian invasion of Ukraine. In villages and towns, street names were changed and Soviet-Russian monuments were demolished. Not only architectural structures, but also street names related to Russia were de-Russified. Changes were made in Lviv, Dnipro, Kyiv and Kharkiv. Ivano-Frankivsk became the first city in Ukraine to be completely free of Russian place names.

In June 2022, the city of Kyiv held an electronic consultation to select Ukrainian names with which to rename streets and squares bearing Russian names. 6.5 million Ukrainians took part in the consultation.

Minister of Culture and Information Policy Oleksandr Tkachenko stated that the derussification of Ukraine will take place naturally and that "it's time to say goodbye to the symbols of the Russian-imperial, Soviet ideology forever." He also noted that the Government of Ukraine approved the project of the document "On Amendments to the Law of Ukraine: On Protection of Cultural Heritage" With this, there will be legal grounds for the removal of cultural heritage monuments from the State Register of Immovable Monuments of Ukraine, which is a symbol of the Russian imperial and Soviet totalitarian politics and ideology.

On 21 April 2023, President Volodymyr Zelenskyy signed the Law of Ukraine "On the Condemnation and Prohibition of Propaganda of Russian Imperial Policy in Ukraine and the Decolonization of Toponymy". This law prohibits toponymy that symbolizes or glorifies Russia and the USSR, their memorial sites, dates, events, individuals who carried out aggression against Ukraine (or another country), as well as totalitarian policies and practices of the Soviet Union and Russia, including Ukrainians in Russian-occupied territories of Ukraine.

== Policies enacted ==
=== Promotion of the Ukrainian language ===
- On 17 October 2016, the Minister of Infrastructure of Ukraine Volodymyr Omelyan instructed his staff to rid Boryspil International Airport and other airports in Ukraine of Russian language and communist names. According to Omelyan, all information on electronic billboards and signs or announced by loudspeakers must be in Ukrainian and English only. "This is not only a question of using the state language – it is a question of self-respect", the Minister said.
- On 23 May 2017, the "Rules for placement of advertising media in the city of Kyiv" adopted by the Kyiv City Council came into force. From now on, all advertising in the capital must be in Ukrainian.
- On 5 October 2017, the Kyiv City Council adopted a decision "On measures to ensure a regional language policy in the city of Kyiv" and established that in the city of Kyiv Ukrainian is the language of work, record keeping and documentation of all local self-government bodies, enterprises, institutions and organizations of communal ownership, and the language of official announcements and messages.
- On 2 November 2017, the Zhytomyr Oblast Council adopted a decision on the de-Russification of the service sector in the region. In the decision "On overcoming the consequences of Soviet occupation in the language environment of Zhytomyr region", it is recommended to use Ukrainian as the language of work, record keeping and documentation of local self-government bodies, enterprises, institutions and organizations of communal ownership. In addition, advertisements, signs, posters, notices and other forms of audio, photo, video advertising products and price tags must be in the Ukrainian language.
- On 12 December 2017, the Cherkasy City Council adopted a decision "On measures to ensure the regional language policy in the city of Cherkasy", according to which Ukrainian is the main language in all spheres of life in the city. The menu of restaurants, advertising, signs and posters must be in Ukrainian.
- On 15 February 2018, the session of the Kropyvnytskyi City Council adopted the draft decision "On measures to ensure the regional language policy". The decision states that on the territory of the city, all names of institutions, enterprises, organisations, signs, posters, public notices, advertisements must be exclusively in the Ukrainian language. In addition, all catering establishments must have a menu in the national language, which they are obliged to offer to visitors in the first place. Staff must communicate with customers primarily in Ukrainian and switch to another language only at the request of consumers.
- On 16 February 2018, the Lviv City Council approved the resolution "On regulation of the language of service to citizens in the sphere of service provision, trade and provision of information about goods and services in the city of Lviv". The resolution recommends catering and service establishments to provide services in Ukrainian as well as English. The document also establishes that all signs, posters, notices and price tags in Lviv shall be in the state language.
- On 31 May 2018, the President of Ukraine, Petro Poroshenko signed the Decree "On urgent measures to strengthen the state status of the Ukrainian language and promote the creation of a unified cultural space of Ukraine." The decree aimed at ensuring compliance with constitutional guarantees regarding the comprehensive development and functioning of the Ukrainian language as the state language in all spheres of public life throughout the territory of Ukraine, strengthening its consolidating role in Ukrainian society as a means of strengthening state unity, taking into account the need to protect the national linguistic and cultural and linguistic information space, supporting the development of national culture, and encouraging the processes of its integration into the European and world cultural space.
- On 4 October 2018, 261 deputies of the Verkhovna Rada voted for the draft law "On supporting the functioning of the Ukrainian language as the state language" (No. 5670-d) in the first reading. Preparation of the draft law for the second reading lasted about four months. During this time, the Verkhovna Rada Committee on Culture and Spirituality worked out more than two thousand amendments that came from people's deputies.
- On 25 April 2019, the Verkhovna Rada adopted the law "On supporting the functioning of the Ukrainian language as the state language" in the second reading.
- On 14 May 2019, the Verkhovna Rada of Ukraine rejected draft resolutions that blocked the signing of the previously adopted law on the functioning of the Ukrainian language as the state language. Chairman of the Verkhovna Rada Andriy Parubiy signed the law on the functioning of the Ukrainian language as the state language.
- On 15 May 2019, President Petro Poroshenko signed the law "On supporting the functioning of the Ukrainian language as the State language" and the following day the law was published by Voice of Ukraine. The law enters into force in 2 months from the date of publication.

=== Demotion of the Russian language ===
- On 28 February 2018, the Constitutional Court of Ukraine issued a decision regarding the unconstitutionality of the 2012 Kolesnichenko-Kivalov Law, effectively canceling it. The law had acknowledged Russian and other minority languages as regional languages of Ukraine, thus allowing their use in courts, schools and other government institutions in areas of Ukraine where the national minorities exceeded 10% of the population.
- On 12 April 2018, the Mykolaiv Oblast Council rejected a motion on revoking the status of the Russian language as a regional language, granted in accordance with the repealed Kolesnichenko-Kivalov Law, which had recently been annulled by the Constitutional Court.
- On 25 April 2018, the Odesa City Council, by a majority of 50 of its 53 members, decided not to amend its regulations on the implementation of the Kivalov-Kolesnichenko Language Law, despite the fact that this law had recently been annulled by the Constitutional Court.
- On 6 December 2018, deputies of the Kharkiv Oblast Council voted to cancel the decision to grant regional status to the Russian language.
- On 6 May 2019, the Dnipropetrovsk District Administrative Court canceled the decision to grant the Russian language in the city of Dnipro the status of a regional language.
- On 7 June 2019, the Donetsk District Administrative Court canceled the decision to grant the Russian language in the Donetsk region the status of a regional language. The applicant is a well-known fighter for the rights of Ukrainians in Ukraine, associate professor of the programming department of Ivan Franko National University of Lviv, Svyatoslav Lytynskyi.
- Various village councils of the Luhansk Oblast canceled the decision to grant the Russian language the status of a regional language: on 26 September 2019, the Holubivsk village council; on 1 October 2019, the Novovodiansk village; on 3 October 2019, the Epiphany village council; on 4 November 2019, the Makeiv village council; on 7 November 2019, the Novomykilsk village council; on 21 November 2019, the Mykhailo village council.
- On 23 October 2020, the Zaporizhzhia District Administrative Court canceled the decision to grant the Russian language in the city of Zaporizhzhia the status of a regional language.
- On 4 December 2020, the Odesa District Administrative Court canceled the decision to grant the Russian language in the Odesa Oblast the status of a regional language.
- On 7 November 2025 the Dnipro city council introduce a moratorium on the public use of Russian language cultural products "created or reproduced in Russian"; this moratorium was set to end only after "the complete end of the occupation of the territory of Ukraine."

=== Renaming of toponyms ===
==== Kyiv ====
- On 14 December 2016, the Standing Committee of the Kyiv City Council on Culture, Tourism and Information Policy approved the draft decision "On renaming avenues, boulevards, streets, alleys, clarifying the names and returning the historical name in the city of Kyiv", which proposes to modify the names of two streets and an alley. The changes concern only the spelling of proper names.
- On 22 February 2018, the Kyiv City Council decided to de-Russify the names of nine streets and alleys in Kyiv.
- On 6 December 2018, the Kyiv City Council renamed Novorossiysk Square to Chernihivska, and Tolstoy Street to Volodymyr Bets Street.
- On 27 March 2023, Kyiv City Council renamed the city's Yuri Gagarin Street (was named after Soviet/Russian cosmonaut) to Leonid Kadeniuk Avenue (Kadeniuk was the first astronaut of independent Ukraine)
- On 18 May 2023, the Kyiv City Council renamed 26 more city objects, including the Kyiv Metro stations Ploshcha Lva Tolstoho ("Leo Tolstoy Square") to Ploshcha Ukrainskykh Heroiv ("Square of Ukrainian Heroes"), Druzhby Narodiv ("Friendship of Nations") to Zvirynetska, and the station under construction Prospekt Pravdy ("Pravda Avenue") to Varshavska. These renamings meant that 314 city objects had already received new names.

==== Rest of the country ====
- On 4 February 2016, the Verkhovna Rada launched an active decommunization and de-Russification policy by adopting the Resolution "On renaming certain settlements and raions", which renamed a number of settlements named after Russian statesmen.
- On 1 July 2017, the Chernivtsi City Council renamed the Moscow Olympics street to the Sich Riflemen street.
- On 14 December 2017, the Kyiv Oblast Council supported the renaming of Pereiaslav-Khmelnytskyi to Pereiaslav.
- On 30 October 2019, the Verkhovna Rada returned the historical name of Pereiaslav to the city of Pereiaslav-Khmelnytskyi. This was done under request of the city council.
- On 9 October 2020, the Cabinet of Ministers of Ukraine adopted the Resolution "On Renaming Certain Territories and Objects of the Nature Reserve Fund".
- On 13 April 2022, 37 streets connected with Russia were renamed in the Ivano-Frankivsk Municipality.
- In October 2022, the Krasnohrad City Council renamed their (among others) Pushkin and Yuri Gagarin streets.
- On 21 March 2023, the Verkhovna Rada outlawed toponymy with names associated with the Russian Empire and the Soviet Union. The law's explanatory note stated it is "a ban on assigning geographic objects names that glorify, perpetuate, promote, or symbolize the occupying state." The following month, President Volodymyr Zelenskyy signed the law.
- In May 2023 Poltava renamed (Soviet World War II General) Nikolai Nikitchenko Street in honor of Dzhokhar Dudayev.
- On 26 April 2024, the Kharkiv City Council renamed 367 streets and two Kharkiv Metro stations. One station was derussified: Pushkinska ("Pushkin") to Yaroslava Mudroho ("Yaroslav the Wise").
- On 26 July 2024, the Kharkiv Regional Administration renamed 48 streets and three Kharkiv Metro stations Prospekt Haharina ("Gagarin Avenue") to Levada, Heroiv Pratsi ("Heroes of Labour") to Saltivska, and Zavod imeni Malysheva ("Malyshev Factory") to Zavodska.
- On 19 September 2024, the Verkhovna Rada voted to rename 327 populated places and four raions. Among them were ten cities: Novomoskovsk to Samar, Pershotravensk to Shakhtarske, Pervomaisk to Sokolohirsk, Molodohvardiisk to Otamanivka, Sievierodonetsk to Siverskodonetsk, Chervonohrad to Sheptytskyi, Druzhba to Khutir-Mykhailivskyi, Krasnohrad to Berestyn, Pervomaiskyi to Zlatopil, and Vatutine to Bahacheve.
- On 9 October 2024, the Verkhovna Rada renamed the cities of Yuzhnoukrainsk and Yuzhne to Pivdennoukrainsk and Pivdenne respectively.

=== Demolition of monuments ===
- On 26 April 2022, the bronze statues accompanying the People's Friendship Arch depicting two men, Ukrainian and Russian, raising a Soviet emblem was dismantled in Kyiv. During the dismantling process, the head belonging to the statue's Russian figure fell off.
- On 21 April 2022, a Zoya Kosmodemyanskaya monument was destroyed in Chernihiv. The city would later demolish a Pushkin monument on April 30.
- The Monument to the founders of Odesa, also known as the monument to Empress Catherine II and her companions José de Ribas, François Sainte de Wollant, Platon Zubov and Grigory Potemkin, was removed on 28 December 2022.
- On 1 August 2023, work began to replace the Hammer and Sickle of the Motherland Monument in Kyiv with the Ukrainian coat of arms. The replacement was completed on 6 August, with the monument rechristened Mother Ukraine.
- On June 4 2026, a statue of Kyiv-born Russian author Mikhail Bulgakov was removed from Andriivskyi Descent.

=== Russian cultural centers ===
- On 25 October 2016, the Lviv Oblast Council decided to evict the Russian Cultural Center from the communal premises and rent the premises to groups involved in the Ukrainian army's operations in eastern Ukraine against pro-Russian separatists. On 13 October 2018, the "Warrior's House" – a centre for participants and veterans of the Russian-Ukrainian war – was opened in the building of the former Russian Cultural Centre.
- On 15 November 2017, in response to insinuations about the possible sale of the National Cultural Centre of Ukraine in Moscow, a group of Verkhovna Rada deputies asked for the closure of the Russian cultural centres in Ukraine claiming that they were used to provide a legal cover for the subversive activities of Russian special services.

=== Others ===
- During a meeting on 16 June 2022, a working group of the Ministry of Education and Science of Ukraine decided, in connection with the invasion of Russian Federation into Ukraine, to remove more than 40 works by Soviet and Russian authors from school textbooks.
- On 7 February 2023, millions of books, mostly in Russian language, were removed from the country public libraries.
- On 3 May 2023 (in its second reading), the Verkhovna Rada adopted the law "On Amendments to the Law of Ukraine On the Protection of Cultural Heritage", which legalized the removal of "Soviet and imperial cultural monuments" from the state register. The law was known as "Anti-Pushkin law".
- On 2 September 2024, the National Bank of Ukraine initiated the process of renaming the kopiika (1/100 hryvnia) to the historical shah.

== See also ==
- Chronology of Ukrainian language suppression
- Derussianization
  - Demolition of monuments to Alexander Pushkin in Ukraine
  - Demolition of monuments to Vladimir Lenin in Ukraine
  - Russification of Ukraine
- Decommunization
  - Decommunization in Russia
  - Decommunization in Ukraine
    - List of communist monuments in Ukraine
    - List of Ukrainian toponyms that were changed as part of decommunization in 2016
    - Ukrainian decommunization laws
- Human rights in Ukraine
- Language policy in Ukraine
  - Ukrainization in the 1920s and 1930s
  - Reversal of Ukrainization policies in Soviet Ukraine
- Lustration in Ukraine
- People's Friendship Arch, colloquial name "Yarmo" (Yoke)
- Ukrainian nationalism
  - Law of Ukraine "On supporting the functioning of the Ukrainian language as the State language"
  - Ukrainian independence awakening
  - Ukrainization

=== Related topics ===
- 2014 pro-Russian unrest in Ukraine
- Accession of Ukraine to the European Union
- Annexation of Crimea by the Russian Federation
- Anti-war protests in Russia (2022–present)
- Geopolitics of Russia
  - All-Russian nation
  - Eurasianism
  - Moscow, third Rome
  - Opposition to the Euromaidan
  - Russian separatist forces in Ukraine
  - Russian world
  - Ruscism
- International recognition of the Donetsk People's Republic and the Luhansk People's Republic
- Krasovsky case
- #KyivNotKiev
- Media portrayal of the Russo-Ukrainian War
- Russian imperialism
- Russian irredentism
- Russian nationalism
- Ukraine–NATO relations
- War crimes in the Russian invasion of Ukraine
  - Allegations of genocide of Ukrainians in the Russo-Ukrainian War
  - Bucha massacre
  - Child abductions in the Russo-Ukrainian War
