= Viacheslav Rublyov =

Ukrainian politician

- Вячеслав Рубльов
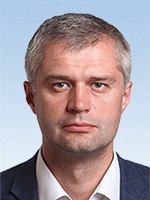
- Official portrait, 2019

People's Deputy of Ukraine
- Incumbent
- Assumed office 29 August 2019
- Preceded by: Serhiy Martyniak
- Constituency: Volyn Oblast, No. 20

Personal details
- Born: 25 February 1979 (age 47) Lutsk, Ukrainian SSR, Soviet Union (now Ukraine)
- Party: Servant of the People
- Other political affiliations: Independent
- Education: Lesya Ukrainka Volyn National University

Viacheslav Volodymyrovych Rublyov (Ukrainian: Вячеслав Володимирович Рубльов; born 25 February 1979) is a Ukrainian politician currently serving as a People's Deputy of Ukraine from Ukraine's 20th electoral district since 29 August 2019 as a member of Servant of the People.

Member of the Verkhovna Rada Committee on the Organization of State Power, Local Self-Government, Regional Development and Urban Planning, Chairman of the Subcommittee on Regional Policy and Local Budgets.

== Biography ==
Viacheslav Rublyov was born on 25 February 1979 in the city of Lutsk in Ukraine's western Volyn Oblast. In 1986 he went to the first grade of secondary school № 1 in Kostopil, Ukraine.

After graduating from the ninth grade in 1994, he entered the Kostopil Medical School, which he graduated in 1997. From 1997 to 2002 Rublyov studied at the Lesya Ukrainka Volyn National University, where he graduated as a biology teacher. From 2006 to 2008, he studied at the Institute for Advanced Training of the State Employment Service and qualified as a manager-economist.

In 2019, Rublyov was elected as a People's Deputy of Ukraine in Ukraine's 20th electoral district (Gorokhiv, Lokachyn, Lutsk, Rozhysche, Turia raions) from Servant of the People. At the time of the election: adviser to the chairman of the Volyn Oblast Council, non-partisan. Lives in Lutsk. The current deputy Serhiy Martyniak won.

Journalists of the anti-corruption non-governmental organisation Chesno have claimed that Rublyov has engaged in "voter bribery", namely when visiting kindergartens, schools and boarding houses donated sweets, printers, computers. He also advertised at the expense of the regional budget and the charity fund, delivering the necessary medicines and remedies for physicians.
