= Fofudja =

Ukrainian Internet meme

Fofudja (Russian: Фофудья [fɐˈfudʲjə], Fofudya) is an internet and social phenomenon in the Ukrainian segment of the LiveJournal community. While its name denotes a piece of religious clothing, it has been used lately as a satirical protest against alleged Russian imperialism, as well as xenophobia, anti-Ukrainian sentiment, antisemitism and religious intolerance. By application of reductio ad absurdum this phenomenon involves people assuming comically exaggerated xenophobic and antisemitic views with the aim to mock them. As such, members of the Fofudja community sarcastically purport to be members of the supposedly oppressed Russian-speaking minority in Ukraine suffering from nationalist and Zionist oppression. By adopting the language and many of the ideas of Russian nationalists and comically exaggerating them members of the fofudja community thus make an effort to repudiate them.

Many believe this original Ukrainian creation to be the means to combat prejudice and xenophobia exhibited towards Ukrainians in modern Russia, and to mock Russian nationalists within Ukraine proper.

The meme rapidly gained popularity in the Ukrainian segment of Internet as an ironical nickname of some Russian nationalists and Orthodox fundamentalists.

== Origins of the term ==
The word "fofudja" was quite obscure, not included in several editions of orthographic dictionaries in Ukraine and Russia, and long remained unknown to the general public.

According to the Brockhaus and Efron Encyclopedic Dictionary, fofudja (Russian: фофудья, Greek: φουφουδότης) is an oriental precious cloth woven with gold thread and often used in ceremonial garments in the Byzantine Empire during the time of Kievan Rus and similar to an ephod.

The birth of the internet meme with this name has an exact date: March 1, 2006. On this day a LiveJournal post described a question to the leader of Ukrainian communists Petro Symonenko during an Internet chat:

"Hello, I am from Kherson Oblast and I am an ethnic Russian. My daughter was prohibited from wearing a fofudja at school, a symbol of Russian culture — on the grounds that the state language is Ukrainian. I just wanted to ask you, Peter Nikolayevich, for how long [will it last]?

== Main features and usage ==
The main symbol of this phenomenon is the fofudja itself. In the view of some observers the name was probably selected because of a number of factors: because of its obscurity, because it sounds similar to a piece of clothing called "fufaika", a synonym for telogreika and also due to its Byzantine origin and orthodox symbolism. Members of the community sarcastically position themselves as semi-underground Russian minority in present-day Ukraine, proud Russian patriots and devout Orthodox Christians. They also pretend to be fiercely chauvinistic with well defined xenophobic and antisemitic views. As such, the generally accepted view of the community is that they are living on eternal Russian lands, speak the only acceptable and "normal" Russian language and patiently await imminent liberation from Ukrainian and Jewish oppression. The latter are termed with one derogatory word for both ethnicities: zhydobanderivtsi (Yid-Banderites).

Fofudja as a piece of religious clothing is meant to be a symbol of Russian Orthodoxy and of Russian culture.

Trying to express their admiration for the Imperial Russia some usage of the old style Cyrillic has also been noted. The symbol of "fofudja", the catchphrase "доколє" ("for how long" "until when", an archaic question word), the Russian-Ukrainian letter mix and the Imperial Cyrillic — these are the distinctive features of this Internet phenomenon that spread beyond the Live Journal blog and into the wider community in Ukraine. It is becoming commonly used in everyday speech in Ukraine, on numerous Internet blog sites and has been noted lately in print as well. The phenomenon of the catchphrase Dokole (Доколє) is believed to be in an attempt to exploit the language of the Orthodox and Russian nationalist zealots that have become popular in Russia.

== Examples of usage ==
The use of numerous abbreviations is also one of the characteristic features of the Fofudja community:

- І.З.Т. — ізвінітє за тавтологію (Pardon my tautology).
- І.З.І.Ж.Б.К. — ізвінітє за іспользованіє жидобандеровской клавіатурьі (Please excuse the use of Kike-Banderite keyboard).

== See also ==
- Ukrainophobia
- Padonki
- Preved
