= Anton Drobovych =

Ukrainian philosopher and academic

Anton Eduardovych Drobovych
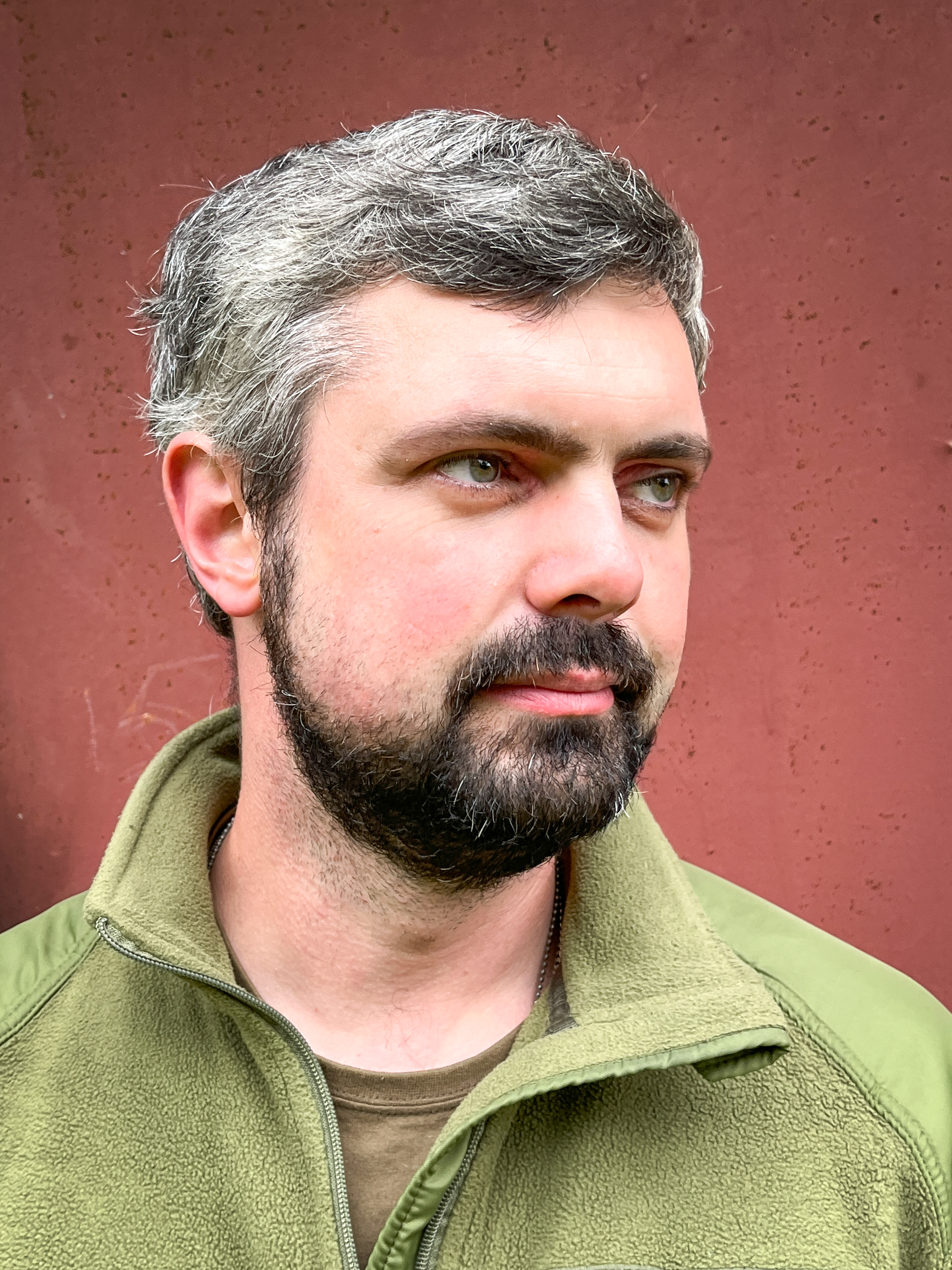
- Drobovych in 2022

Head of the Ukrainian Institute of National Remembrance
- In office 4 December 2019 – 13 December 2024
- Preceded by: Volodymyr Viatrovych
- Succeeded by: Yulia Hnatiuk (acting)

Personal details
- Born: March 28, 1986 (age 40) Kiev, Ukrainian SSR, Soviet Union
- Education: National Pedagogical Drahomanov University
- Occupation: Philosopher

Anton Drobovych (Ukrainian: Антон Дробович; born 28 March 1986) is a Ukrainian philosopher and academic, expert in the field of communications, education and culture, who was the fourth head of the Ukrainian Institute of National Memory.

== Biography ==
Anton Dobrovych was born in Kyiv in 1986. During his master's studies at the Institute of Philosophical Education and Science of the National Pedagogical Drahomanov University, he was recognized as the "Best Student of 2010".

He obtained a master's degree in philosophy from the university in 2010, and also became a candidate in political sciences in 2014, and then obtained another master's degree in law in 2018. He is also a graduate of the "Values and Society" program of the Aspen Institute in Kyiv, where he regularly moderated philosophical seminars. Dobrovych is also a laureate of the IV Stedley Art Foundation art competition, a member of the Board of the Youth Association of Religious Studies, a former head of educational programs of the Babyn Yar Holocaust Memorial Center and a member of the Institute of Socio-Economic Research. He became an associate professor at the Drahomanov University, and authored a series of lectures on mythology in art, as well as more than 50 scientific publications in the field of philosophy, cultural studies, and anthropology.

Dobrovych has worked in state institutions of culture and education, including in the position of advisor to the Minister of Education and Science of Ukraine, and as head of the planning and development strategy service of the Mystetskyi Arsenal National Art and Culture Museum Complex. He has the third rank of civil servant.

He is a representative of the Cabinet of Ministers of Ukraine in the Board of Trustees of the Foundation "Memory, Responsibility and Future" of the Federal Republic of Germany.

Following the 2022 Russian invasion of Ukraine, Drobovych joined the ranks of the Armed Forces of Ukraine and became a serviceman of the 112th separate brigade of Kyiv's ground defence and then in Ukrainian Air Assault Forces 78th Regiment.

== In the Institute of National Memory ==
After the dismissal of Volodymyr Viatrovych from the position of the head of the Ukrainian Institute of National Memory, a competition for this position was announced. In November 2019, 17 applicants remained, and according to the results of the interview at the National Agency for Civil Service, there were two, including Drobovych. After an interview at the Cabinet of Ministers, on 4 December 2019, he was appointed as head of the Ukrainian Institute of National Memory. The order of the Cabinet of Ministers was issued on 11 December 2019.

Before his appointment, Drobovych expressed his intention to make the policy of the Institute "more balanced and liberal" and to increase the level of "inclusiveness of official memory - to make more efforts to preserve the memory of the common history of Ukrainians and Ukrainian Poles, Jews, Armenians, Tatars, Greeks, Bulgarians and others". Dobrovych's appointment marks a return to form for the institute, which suffered a tarnished reputation as a result of Dobrovych's two controversial predecessors, Valeriy Soldatenko and Volodymyr Viatrovych. Drobovych has espoused "creative decommunisation", involving creating new research centres to reinterpret and preserve Ukraine's Soviet heritage without eradicating it completely.

During the initial period of the tenure, he restored working communication with the Polish Institute of National Remembrance, advocated the preservation of Ukrainian burials in Poland and the observance of bilateral agreements, in particular, regarding the preservation of the graves of Ukrainian rebels on Mount Monastyr. At the same time, the Institute launched a number of digital initiatives, including the Virtual Museum of Ukrainian Emigration, the digital Archive of Oral History and the Virtual Museum of Russian Aggression. The latter received an award from human rights activists as "the best initiative in the field of historical memory in relation to the Russian armed aggression".

Following the end of his term, Cabinet of Ministers has issued an order to dismiss Drobovych on 13 December 2024. Previously, Drobovych stated that he will not be reappointed for another five-year term, after he declined a proposal from the Minister of Culture and Strategic Communications Mykola Tochytskyi. Until the next head is appointed, Drobovych's first deputy Yulia Hnatiuk will serve as the acting head of the Ukrainian Institute of National Memory.

== Personal life ==
Drobovych lives in Kyiv and is married. He is a fan of poetry, and translated the ballad "The Rains of Castamere" from the TV series Game of Thrones into Ukrainian. Besides his native Ukrainian, he is fluent in Russian, English at the intermediate level, and Spanish at the pre-intermediate level.
