= Jared McBride =

Jared McBride (born December 7, 1987) is a historian at University of California who examines Russia, Ukraine, and Eastern Europe in the 20th century with a focus on nationalist movements, mass violence (holocaust studies), interethnic conflicts, and war crimes prosecution, related to both the Second World War and Cold War periods.

== Education ==
Jared McBride received his BA in history summa cum laude at Northeastern University in 2004 and completed his Ph.D. in history at UCLA in fall 2014.

== Research ==
Jared McBride was the first ever Margee and Douglas Greenberg Research Fellow from 2014-2015 then residence at the Mandel Center from September 1, 2015 to April 30, 2016.

2015 he started at Wilson Center the research project "Killing Neighbors: The Undoing of Multi-Ethnic Western Ukraine in World War II" evolved into his forthcoming book manuscript titled "Pathways to Perpetration: Mass Violence and the Undoing of Multi-Ethnic Western Ukraine, 1941–1944" were he draws on newly opened KGB archives and a decade of research in Russia and Ukraine to explain why local civilians perpetrated multi-layered ethnic violence against diverse victim groups in Nazi-occupied Ukraine.

== Awards ==
- In 2014 Mc Bride was the first recipient of the Margee and Douglas Greenberg Research Fellowship.
- 2025: Undergraduate Research Week Faculty Mentor Award.

== Bibliography ==
=== Books and Papers ===
- McBride, Jared (2016). Contesting The Malyn Massacre: The Legacy Of Inter-Ethnic Violence And The Second World War In Eastern Europe. Carl Beck Papers. Vol. 2405. doi:10.5195/cbp.2016.203.
- Mc Bride, Jared; Ivchyk, Nataliia, eds. (2027), The Holocaust in Ukraine. New Research on a Complex Past, New York: Cornell University Press

=== Articles ===
- McBride, Jared (2024). "A Return to Antenora? Observations on Collaboration During the Russo-Ukrainian War". In Diana, Dumitru; Moses, A. Dirk (eds.). The Russian Invasion of Ukraine. Victims, Perpetrators, Justice, and the Question of Genocide. London: Routledge. doi:10.4324/9781003496427. ISBN 9781003496427.
- Rudling, Per Anders; McBride, Jarred (2022). ""Giving Voice and Ending Silence," review article of John-Paul Himka, Ukrainian Nationalists and the Holocaust". Yad Vashem Studies. 50 (2): 185–196.
- Mc Bride, Jared (2022). "The Tuchyn Pogrom: The Names and Faces Behind the Violence, Summer 1941". Holocaust and Genocide Studies. 36 (3): 315–333. doi:10.1093/hgs/dcac041.
- McBride, Jared (2021). "The Many Lives and Afterlives of Khaim Sygal: Borderland Identities and Violence in Wartime Ukraine". Journal of Genocide Research. 23 (4): 547–567. doi:10.1080/14623528.2021.1902653.
- McBride, Jared (2017-11-09). "Ukraine's Invented a 'Jewish-Ukrainian Nationalist' to Whitewash Its Nazi-Era Past". Haaretz. Archived from the original on 2022-06-03.
- Mc Bride, Jared (2016). "Peasants into Perpetrators: The OUN-UPA and the Ethnic Cleansing of Volhynia, 1943–1944". Slavic Review. 75 (3): 630–654. doi:10.5612/slavicreview.75.3.0630.
- Mc Bride, Jared (2016), "Contesting The Malyn Massacre: The Legacy Of Inter-Ethnic Violence And The Second World War In Eastern Europe" (PDF), Carl Beck Papers, vol. 2405, no. 2405, doi:10.5195/cbp.2016.203
- McBride, Jared (2016). "Who's Afraid of Ukrainian Nationalism?". Kritika: Explorations in Russian and Eurasian History. 17 (3): 647–663. doi:10.1353/kri.2016.0039.
- McBride, Jared (2012). ""To Be Stored Forever". Book review of Taras Bul'ba-Borovets': Dokumenty". Ab Imperio. 2012 (1): 434–445. doi:10.1353/imp.2012.0029.

=== Lectures ===
- McBride, Jared (2026-02-10). The Returns of Summer 1941: Perpetrators & Pogroms in..., with Dr. Jared McBride (2-10-26) SSU-HGLS (Video).
- Mc Bride, Jared (2015-01-15). Constructing a Micro-History of the Holocaust in Western Ukraine - Jared McBride (YouTube).

=== Interviews ===
- McBride, Jared (2026-02-24). When Authority Collapsed: Pogroms & Ordinary Perpetrators, an interview with Dr. Jared McBride (Video).
- Knobel, Josh (2022-04-06). Endgame: The History and Future of Ukraine, a Q&A with Dr. Jared McBride (Video).
- Konończuk, Wojciech (2018-07-09). "Amerykański historyk patrzy na Wołyń" [American historian looks at Volhynia]. Tygodnik Powszechny (in Polish). 2018 (29): 54–58. Archived from the original on 2018-07-09.
