= Vynohradar =

Historical neighborhood in Kyiv

Coordinates: 50°30′35″N 30°25′13″E

Vynohradar (Ukrainian: Виноградар, pronounced [wɪnɔˈɦrɑdɐr]) is a historical neighbourhood in the Ukrainian capital Kyiv. Vynohradar is now located in the administrative Shevchenkivskyi and Podilskyi districts. Main roads in the area include the Yevropeiskoho Soiuzu (former Pravdy, renamed in 2024), Svobody, and Heorhiia Honadze (former Radianskoi Ukrainy, renamed in honour of Georgiy Gongadze in 2007) avenues.

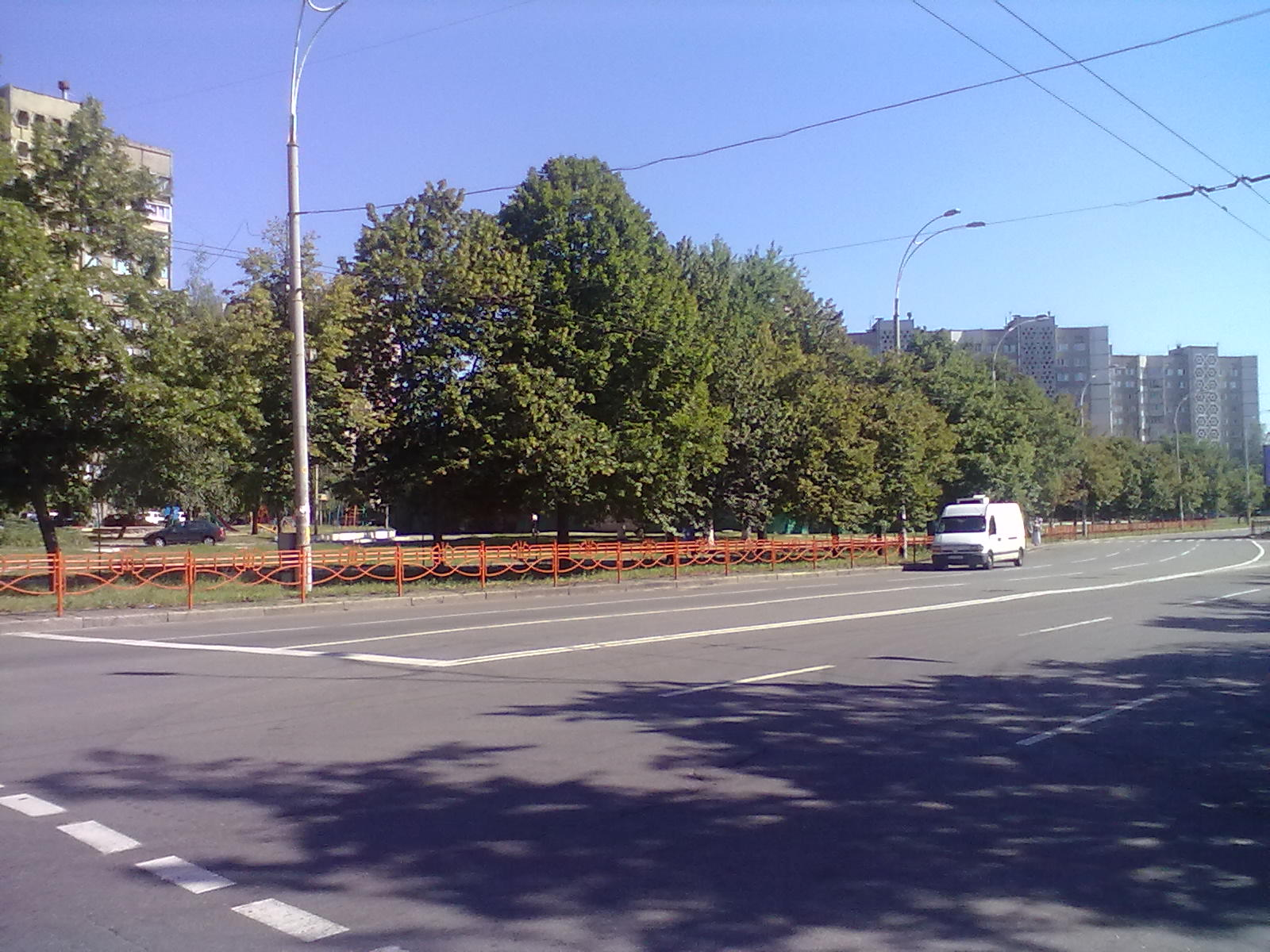
Gongadze Avenue

Vynohradar was founded in 1935 by farmer I.I. Bekasov, who planted grape vines here, hence the name. The Vynohradar kolkhoz was located here in the Soviet times. A residential estate was built in 1975–1987.
