= Ukrainian decommunization laws =

2015 laws banning communist symbols

Ukrainian decommunization laws were passed in 2015, in the early stages of the Russo-Ukrainian War. These laws relate to decommunization in Ukraine as well as commemoration of Ukrainian history, and have been referred to as "memory laws". They outlawed the public display of Soviet communist symbols and propaganda, and also outlawed the public display of Nazi symbols and propaganda. These laws have also restricted the public display of militarism and fascism symbols, including the rising sun flag.

The law mandated the removal of communist-era monuments, and the renaming of places associated with communists or the USSR in general. As a result, Ukraine's toponymy was radically changed, with many pre-1917 names restored and even more Ukrainianized names introduced. More than 51,493 settlements, streets, squares and buildings have been renamed.

The laws have raised some concerns about freedom of speech, as well as international concerns that they honor some organizations and individuals that participated in the mass murder of Jews, Poles, and Communists during the Holocaust in Ukraine and massacres in Volhynia.

== Passage ==
Instrumental in drafting the laws were Ukrainian historian Volodymyr Viatrovych and politician Yuri Shukhevych. The laws passed on 9 April 2015, in the Verkhovna Rada with overwhelming support and were enacted by president Petro Poroshenko on May 15 that year. This started a six-month period for the removal of communist monuments and renaming of public places named after communist-related themes. The laws were published in Holos Ukrayiny on 20 May 2015; this made them come into force officially the next day.

In May 2017, 46 Ukrainian MPs, mainly from the Opposition Bloc faction, appealed to the Constitutional Court of Ukraine to declare the laws unconstitutional. On 16 July 2019 this court upheld the laws.

== Content ==
The decommunization laws are composed of:

- Law no. 2558 "On Condemning the Communist and National Socialist (Nazi) Totalitarian Regimes and Prohibiting the Propagation of their Symbols" — banning Nazi and communist symbols, and public denial of their crimes. That included removal of communist monuments and renaming of public places named after communist-related themes.
- Law no. 2538-1 "On the Legal Status and Honoring of the Memory of the Fighters for the Independence of Ukraine in the 20th Century" — elevating several historical organizations, including the Ukrainian Insurgent Army and the Organization of Ukrainian Nationalists, to official status and assures social benefits to their surviving members.
- Law no. 2539 "On Remembering the Victory over Nazism in the Second World War"
- Law no. 2540 "On Access to the Archives of Repressive Bodies of the Communist Totalitarian Regime from 1917–1991" — placing the state archives concerning repression during the Soviet period under the jurisdiction of the Ukrainian Institute of National Remembrance.

== Controversy ==
In Ukraine as well as abroad, some scholars have expressed concerns about freedom of speech and research with regard to the above laws, issuing an open letter to the President. Particularly problematic is Article 6 of Law 2538-1 on "Responsibility for violating the legislation on the status of the fighters for Ukrainian independence in the 20th century", which stipulates that: "Citizens of Ukraine, foreigners, and also stateless persons who publicly insult the people specified in article 1 of said Law harm the realization of the rights of the fighters for independence of Ukraine in the 20th century and will be held to account in accordance with Ukrainian law", and that: "The public denial of the fact of the legitimacy of the struggle for Ukrainian independence in the 20th century mocks the memory of the fighters for independence of Ukraine in the 20th century, insults the dignity of the Ukrainian people and is illegal”. Critics have argued that this law is attempting to "legislate history" and restricts free speech.

The 2538-1 law has also been controversial abroad, since some of the organizations and individuals that it is to be honoring are recognized as having participated in the mass murder of Jews, Poles, and Communists during the Holocaust in Ukraine and massacres in Volhynia. The law was also passed on the day of the Polish presidential visit to Ukraine, and has been described by Polish politician Tomasz Kalita as "a slap in the face". Former Polish Prime Minister Leszek Miller declared in a televised interview that OUN was responsible for mass murders of Poles, and challenged the Ukrainian law enforcement to persecute him. Ukrainian politician and president of the Ukrainian parliament Volodymyr Groysman, who visited Poland shortly afterward, stated that the law is not intended to be anti-Polish, and was intended to be anti-Soviet and anti-Nazi instead.

== Effects on Ukraine ==
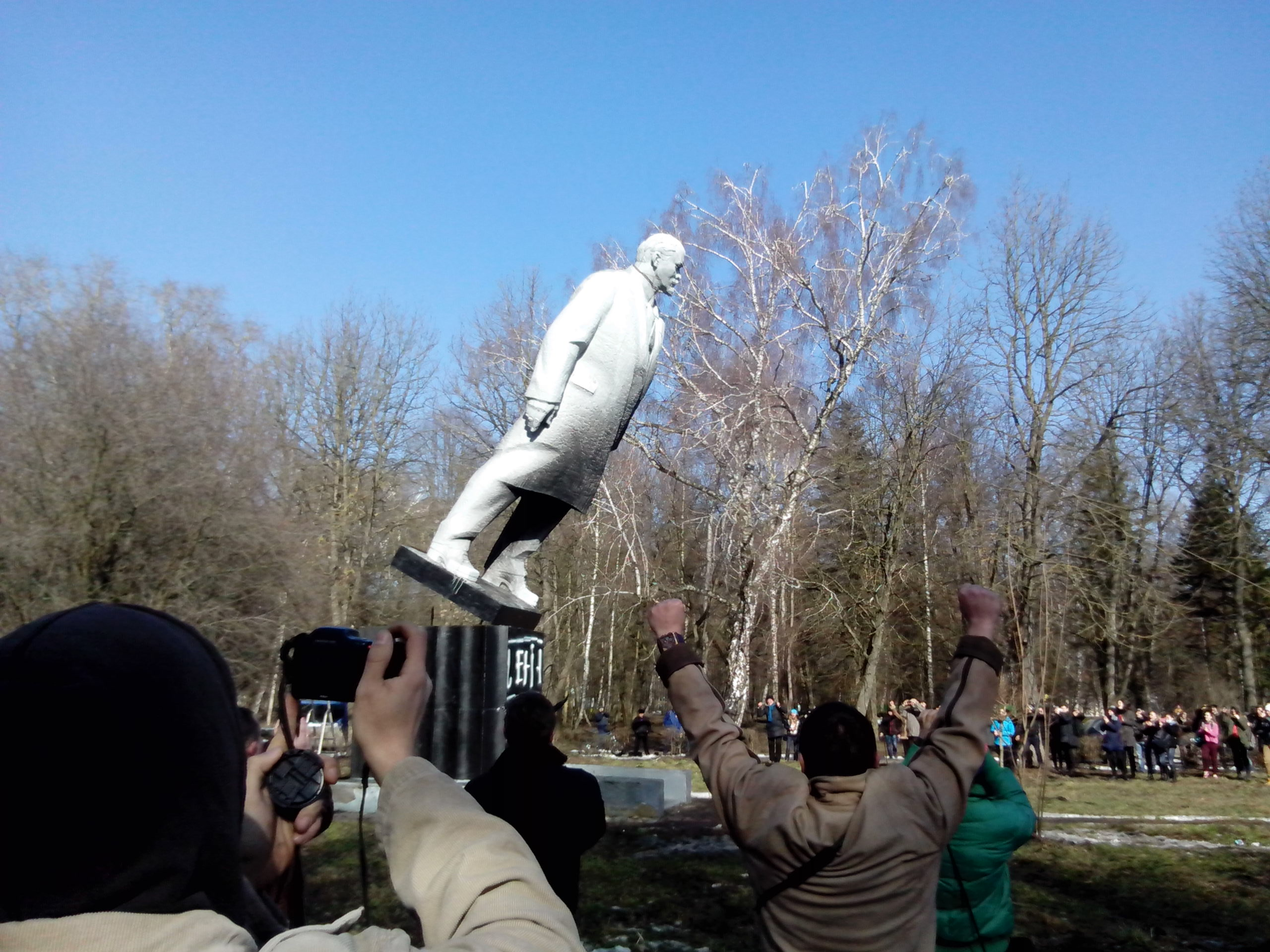
Removal of a Lenin monument in Khmelnytskyi on 21 February 2014 during the Euromaidan-protest

As a result of the law mandating the removal of communist-era monuments, and renaming places named after communist themes Ukraine's toponymy was radically altered and the face of whole cities has been changed. All in all more than 51,493 streets, squares and "other facilities" have been renamed. By June 2016 there were renamed 19 raions, 27 urban districts, 29 cities, 48 urban-type settlements, 119 rural settlements and 711 villages. The fourth largest city was renamed from Dnipropetrovsk to Dnipro. In the second-largest city of Ukraine, Kharkiv, more than 200 streets, 5 administrative raions, 4 parks and 1 metro station had been renamed by early February 2016. In all of 2016 51,493 streets and 987 cities and villages were renamed, 25 raions were renamed and 1,320 Lenin monuments and 1,069 monuments to other communist figures removed. In some villages Lenin statues were remade into "non-communist historical figures" to save money.

On 24 July 2015, the Ukrainian Interior Ministry used the law to strip the Communist Party of Ukraine, the Communist Party of Ukraine (renewed) and the Communist Party of Workers and Peasants of their right to participate in elections and stated it was continuing the court actions that started in July 2014 to end the registration of Ukraine's communist parties. By 16 December 2015, these three parties were banned in Ukraine. However, the Communist Party of Ukraine appealed the ban, which consequently failed to come into force. Later, the April 2015 decommunization law no. 2558 allows the Ministry of Justice to prohibit the Communist Party from participating in elections. The Central Election Commission of Ukraine prohibited the candidacy of Petro Symonenko for the 2019 Ukrainian presidential election due to the fact that the statute, name and symbolism of his party, the Communist Party of Ukraine, did not comply with the 2015 decommunization laws.

Late March 2019 former members of armed units of the Organization of Ukrainian Nationalists, former Ukrainian Insurgent Army members and former members of the Polissian Sich/Ukrainian People's Revolutionary Army (and members of the Ukrainian Military Organization and Carpathian Sich soldiers) were officially granted the status of veterans. This meant that for the first time they could receive veteran benefits, including free public transport, subsidized medical services, annual monetary aid, and public utilities discounts (and will enjoy the same social benefits as former Ukrainian soldiers Red Army of the Soviet Union). There had been several previous attempts to provide former Ukrainian nationalist fighters with official veteran status, especially during the 2005–2009 administration President Viktor Yushenko, but all failed.

In 2019, video game Mortal Kombat 11 was banned in Ukraine, because of the laws banning Communist symbols.

== Polling ==
A November 2016 poll, showed that 48% of respondents supported a ban on Communist ideology in Ukraine, 36% were against it and 16% were undecided. It also showed that 41% of respondents supported the initiative to dismantle all monuments to Lenin in the country, whereas 48% were against it and 11% were undecided.

== See also ==
- Act on the Institute of National Remembrance
- Decommunization in Ukraine
- On the Condemnation and Prohibition of Propaganda of Russian Imperial Policy in Ukraine and the Decolonization of Toponymy
