= Lesya Ukrainka Volyn National University =

Public university in Lutsk, Ukraine

Coordinates: 48.3042°N 38.0181°E

- ДЗВО "Волинський національний університет імені Лесі Українки"
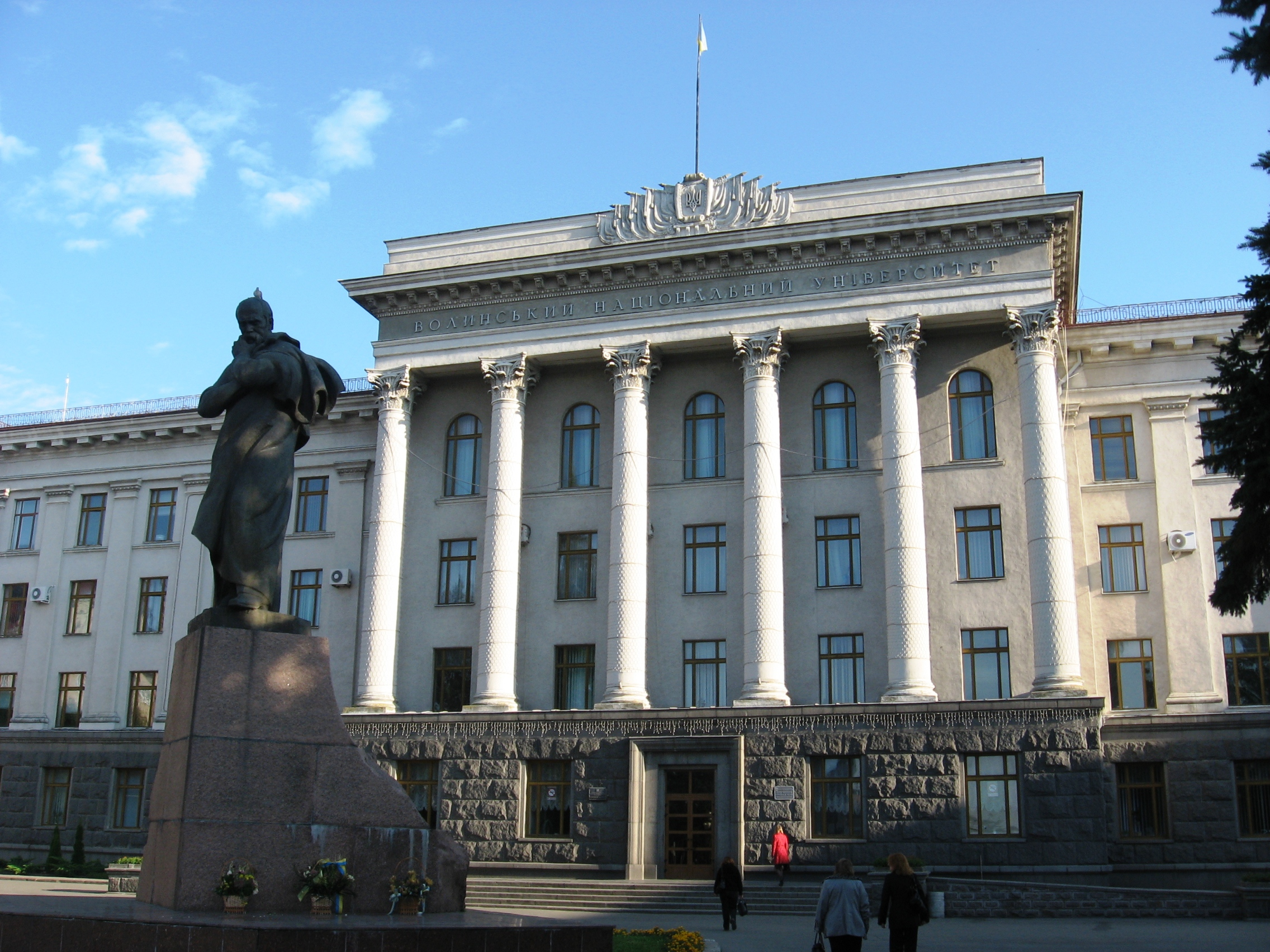
- University building
- Motto: Scientia Vinces
- Established: 1940
- Affiliations: Ministry of Education and Science of Ukraine
- Academic affiliations: Coalition for Advancing Research Assessment
- Rector: Anatolii Tsos
- Students: 12369
- Location: Prosp. Voli 13, Lutsk, 43025, Ukraine
- Campus: Urban
- Website: Official website

University rankings

Regional – Overall
- QS Emerging Europe and Central Asia: 401-450 (2022)

The Lesya Ukrainka Volyn National University (Ukrainian: Волинський національний університет імені Лесі Українки) is a Ukrainian state-sponsored university in Lutsk, named after Lesya Ukrainka.

== History ==
The history of this university began in 1940 with the founding of the Lutsk State Teachers’ Institute. During its first year of operation, 135 students were enrolled for the first-year program. The instruction was provided by a staff of fifty professors working within the departments of Ukrainian and Russian philology, physics, mathematics and geography.

The functioning of the university was interrupted by the outbreak of war in 1941, and did not resume until 1946. In September 1951, the college was reorganized and designated a pedagogical institute, and a year later, it was granted the use of the name of Lesya Ukrainka. At that time the university's only faculties were those of history, philology and mathematics. By the beginning of the 1990s nine faculties were operating in the institute.

On July 16, 1993, by a decree of President Leonid Kravchuk, the institute was given a higher status and received the name Lesya Ukrainka Volyn State University. In September 2007 President Viktor Yushchenko signed a decree granting the university the status of a national university. Then in August 2012, in accordance with a decree signed by President Viktor Yanukovych, Lesya Ukrainka Volyn National University received yet another new official designation: Lesya Ukrainka Eastern European National University in Volyn. This name was intended to reflect the aspirations of the university to establish real and/or symbolic ties with educational institutions in western Europe. On October 15, 2020, the return of the name “Lesya Ukrainka Volyn National University” to the higher education institution was officially confirmed.

== Buildings ==
Classroom and laboratory instruction is conducted in nine different buildings; in addition there are five student dormitories, the university library with holdings of over 400,000 items, four museums, a sanatorium and student polyclinic, a sports complex and a stadium. These facilities are located at various sites within the city of Lutsk. In addition to this, there is a student camp named “Hart”, which is situated at Lake Svitiaz.

== Institutes and faculties ==
Currently six institutes and twelve departments are functioning within the University:

- Institute of Social Sciences

Specialties: culturology, religious studies, sociology, philosophy.

- Institute of Physical Education and Health

Specialties: Olympic and professional sport; physical rehabilitation; physical education.

- Pedagogical Institute

Specialties: preschool upbringing, preschool education, primary teaching, primary education, social pedagogy.

- Institute of Fine Arts

Specialties: music art, visual arts, choreography.

- Psychology Department

Specialties: psychology.

- History Department

Specialties: documentation and informational activity; history; museology and the protection of historical and cultural sites; political science.

- Chemistry Department

Specialties: chemistry; ecology and environmental protection.

- Biology Department

Specialties: biology; forestry and landscape gardening management.

- Mathematics Department

Specialties: computer science; mathematics.

- Economics Department

Specialties: enterprise economics, accounting and auditing, finance and credit; management of innovational activity; management.

- Institute of Foreign Philology

Specialties: language and literature (English); language and literature (German); language and literature (French); Applied Linguistics.

- Department of Law

Specialties: jurisprudence.

- Department of Foreign Affairs

Specialties: country studies; international information; international relations; international economic relations.

- Institute of Philology and Journalism

Specialties: Ukrainian language and literature (with an additional qualification “teacher of foreign literature”); language and literature (Russian) (with an additional qualification “teacher of foreign (English) language”); language and literature (Polish) (with an additional qualification “teacher of foreign (English) language”); journalism; publishing and editing.

- Physics Department

Specialties: physics; physics-related computer studies.

- Geography Department

Specialties: geography; hotel management; economic and social geography; system of land use and surveying; tourism.

- Preparatory Department

The aim of the Preparatory Department is to provide suitable conditions for the effective training of citizens for passing of external independent scoring by means of thorough study of academic disciplines, entering high school and successful adaptation to studying in higher educational establishment. Also there is a preparatory department for foreign citizens.

- Teaching and Research Center of Postgraduate Education

Specialties:physical rehabilitation, Ukrainian language and literature, language and literature (English) Language and Literature (German), psychology, finance and credit, accounting and auditing, law, land management and cadastre, informatics, pre-school education.

== Awards and reputation ==
Lesya Ukrainka Volyn National University was awarded the honorary title “Leader of modern education” on the basis of the results of the Tenth International Exhibition of Educational Institutions “Modern Education in Ukraine 2007” and was awarded a bronze medal in the category “Modernization of higher education in the context of the Bologna Convention requirements”. For development and implementation of innovative educational technologies into its teaching and educational processes, the university was awarded a certificate of recognition, “Innovative educational technologies 2007”. The university was a winner in the “International cooperation in education and science 2007” category at the “Education and career – Student’s day” international exhibition (2008).

The active role of the university in the sphere of international relations has attracted attention both in Ukraine and abroad. On March 7–8, 2008 a delegation from the university took part in the Ninth International Education Fair “Perspektywy 2008”, which was held in Warsaw. In 2009 VNU won the competition of the Ministry of Education and Science of Ukraine in the category “International cooperation in the sphere of education and science”.

VNU was awarded a prize in the Ministry of Education and Science of Ukraine “International cooperation in the sphere of education and science” for the exhibition “Modern education in Ukraine 2009” which was held on February 25–27, 2009 in Kyiv.

== See also ==
List of universities in Ukraine
