= Volodymyr Viatrovych =

Ukrainian politician (born 1977)

- Володимир В'ятрович
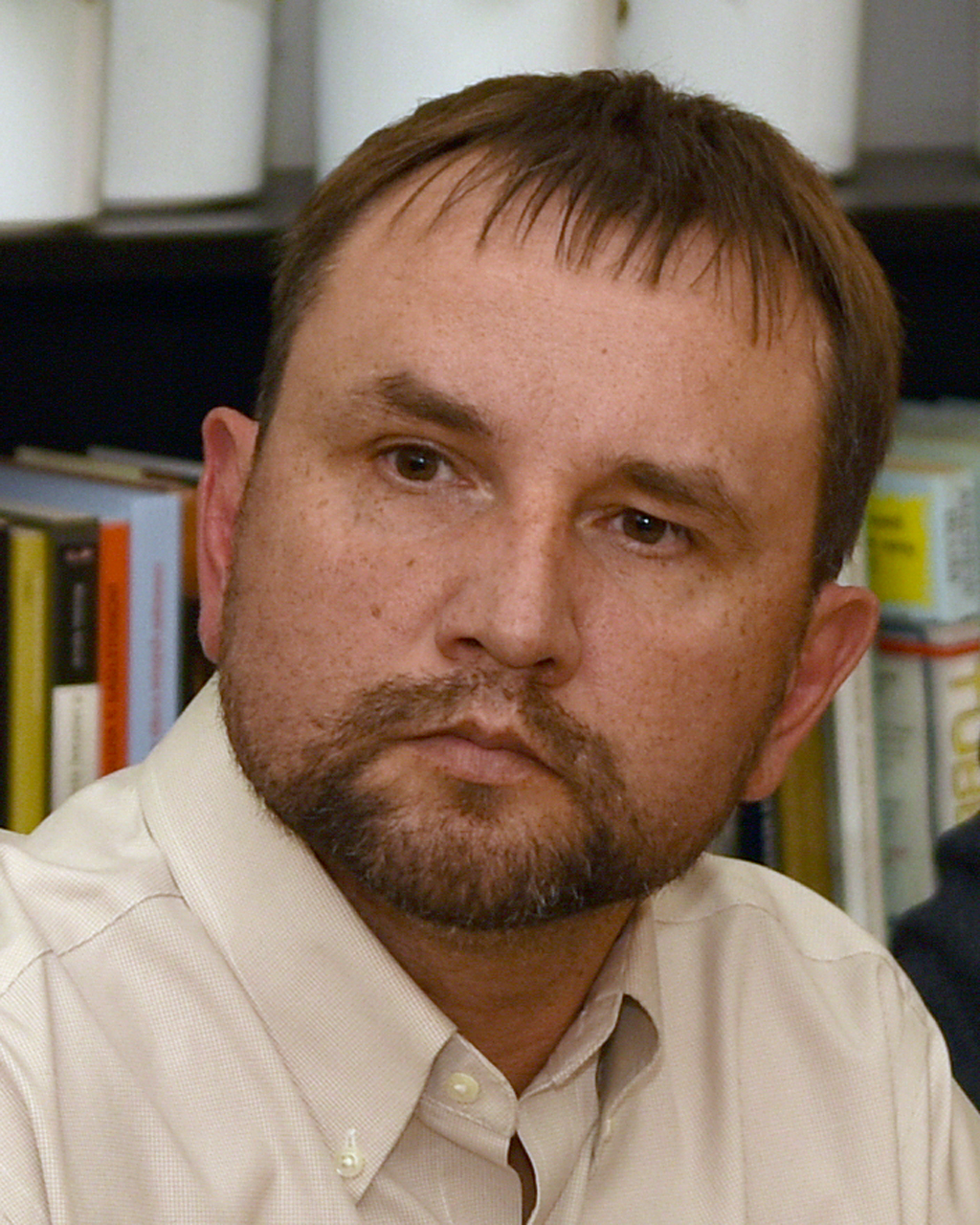
- Viatrovych in 2022

People's Deputy of Ukraine
- Incumbent
- Assumed office 3 December 2019

Head of the Ukrainian Institute of National Remembrance
- In office 25 March 2014 – 18 September 2019
- Preceded by: Valeriy Soldatenko
- Succeeded by: Anton Drobovych

Personal details
- Born: 7 July 1977 Lviv, Ukrainian SSR, Soviet Union
- Party: European Solidarity
- Education: Ivan Franko National University of Lviv
- Occupation: Historian; activist; politician
- Awards

Volodymyr Mykhailovych Viatrovych (Ukrainian: Володимир Михайлович В'ятрович; born 7 July 1977) is a Ukrainian historian, civic activist, and politician.

Viatrovych was the Director of the Center for Research of Liberation Movement from 2002 to 2010. Viatrovych is a member of the board of trustees of the National Museum-Memorial of Victims of the Occupation Regimes "Loncky street Prison" Museum. From 2008 to 2010, he was director of the Archives of the Security Service of Ukraine. From 2010 to 2011, he was senior visiting scholar at the Ukrainian Research Institute at Harvard University, working in particular with the archival documents of Mykola Lebed. He was Director of the Ukrainian Institute of National Remembrance from 25 March 2014 until September 2019.

As a historian, Viatrovych was criticized for whitewashing crimes by Ukrainian nationalists during World War II. He was dismissed from his post in September 2019, with Anton Drobovych succeeding him. In the 2019 Ukrainian parliamentary election, Viatrovych was number 25 on the election list of European Solidarity. Since 3 December 2019, he is a member of the Ukrainian parliament.

== Biography and academic career (1994–present) ==
From 1994 to 1999, Viatrovych was a student at the history faculty of Lviv University (West Ukraine) where he specialised in Ukrainian history. In 2004, he defended his doctoral thesis: "UPA raids beyond Ukrainian borders as part of the creation of an anti-totalitarian national-democratic revolution among the nations of East-Central Europe" (He had already issued a book on the subject in 2001).

From November 2002 to March 2008, Viatrovych was director of the Centre for the Study of the Liberation Movement, based in Lviv. In 2005 and 2006 he lectured at the Ukrainian Catholic University. During that time he drew up the first course in Ukrainian higher education on "The Ukrainian Liberation Movement from the 1920s to 1950s" for students of the historical faculties of the Catholic University and the Ivan Franko Lviv University.

From August 2005 to December 2007, Viatrovych was a research associate at the I. Kripyakevich Institute for Ukrainian Studies at the National Academy of Sciences in Kyiv.

From 2010 to 2011, he worked in the US at the Ukraine Research Institute at Harvard University.

Viatrovych subsequently became director of the Center for the History of State-Building in Ukraine at the National University of Kyiv-Mohyla Academy.

== National Remembrance (2007–2019) ==
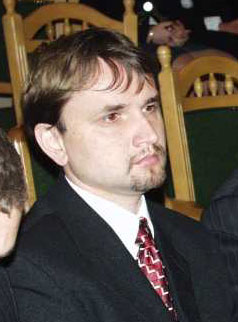
Viatrovych in 2006

Between May 2007 and January 2008, Viatrovych was a representative of the Ukrainian Institute of National Remembrance for Lviv Oblast.

In 2008, he served as research consultant to the international project, “Ukraine Remembers, the World Acknowledges” which aimed to popularise the subject of the Holodomor, the 1932-3 famine in Ukraine, and, through international lobbying, to gain world recognition that this was an act of genocide. From January to October 2008, Viatrovych was head of the archives department at Ukraine's Institute of National Remembrance.

From October 2008 to March 2010, Viatrovych was adviser on research to Valentyn Nalyvaichenko, the head of the SBU or Security Service of Ukraine (2006–2010). Viatrovych was a moving force behind the idea of putting Stalin and other Soviet leaders of the time on trial for genocide for their part in the Holodomor. They were found guilty in January 2010 by the Court of Appeal in Kyiv.

Viatrovych has been a trustee of the Lontsky Prison National Museum-Memorial to the Victims of Occupation Regimes (Nazi and Soviet) in Lviv, since it was set up and opened to the public in 2009. From March 2008 onwards he has chaired the research council of the Centre for the Study of the Liberation Movement (Lviv).

On 25 March 2014, Viatrovych was appointed Director of the Ukrainian Institute of National Remembrance by the First Yatsenyuk Government. In September 2019, the Honcharuk Government dismissed Viatrovych from the position of the Director.

According to the Jewish Policy Center, in 2017, Viatrovych described the Ukrainian Nazi collaborator Roman Shukhevych as an "eminent personality" and defended the legality of the public display of the symbol of the Galician SS division.

== Political activism (2004, 2013–2015) ==
When the Orange Revolution took place in 2004, Viatrovych took an active part, supposedly as a leader of the PORA ("It's Time!") youth movement.

During the Euromaidan protests in 2013, Viatrovych called for active measures against the authorities. He coordinated mass demonstrations and led a column of activists to block the government buildings and the parliament (Verkhovna Rada).

Speaking of the rotation of Euromaidan activists he recalled the activities of the Ukrainian Insurgent Army or UPA: "In the 1940s and 1950s conditions in the underground were worse: people did not leave temporarily to go back to work, but because a comrade had gone forever. That is why we shall succeed!" He also commented: "We do not intend to halt after the regime has changed in Ukraine, when we have got rid of the rule of Yanukovych".

In May 2015, President Petro Poroshenko approved four laws concerning decommunization in Ukraine. Volodymyr Viatrovych was involved in the drafting of two of these laws. The criminal sentences imposed by these acts and their phrasing came in for criticism within the country and abroad. The law "On access to the archives of repressive bodies of the communist totalitarian regime from 1917 to 1991" placed the state archives concerning repression during the Soviet period under the jurisdiction of the Ukrainian Institute of National Remembrance, then headed by Volodymyr Viatrovych.

Canadian historian David R. Marples initiated an open letter addressed to Ukrainian President Petro Poroshenko, calling on him not to sign the so-called anti-communism law and the law honoring the "heroes of the nation". This letter was signed by numerous historians involved with Ukraine. In a response, Viatrovych described the mass murders of Poles and Jews by Ukrainian nationalists as mere "individual opinions" and accused the signatories of spreading Russian propaganda.

== 2019 election to parliament ==
In the 2019 Ukrainian parliamentary election, Viatrovych was number 25 on the election list of European Solidarity. Only the first 23 candidates were elected. But, after Iryna Lutsenko gave up her mandate, Viatrovych did replace her and he was sworn in as People's Deputy of Ukraine on 3 December 2019. Number 24 of the election list European Solidarity, Nataliya Boyko, waived her right to enter parliament in favour of Viatrovych.

In the 2020 Ukrainian local elections, Viatrovych ran for the Ivano-Frankivsk Oblast Council as the first number on the list of European Solidarity. He did not take up his won seat.

== Decorations and awards ==
- Cross of Ivan Mazepa (2009), as department head at the Security Service of Ukraine.
- Vasyl Stus Prize (2012), for his book History marked 'Classified Material', 2011.

== Viatrovych as historian (2002–2012) ==
The first Volodymyr Viatrovych's book about the rallies of Ukrainian Insurgent Army (UPA) in Czechoslovakia was written based on his PhD thesis. It was devoted to a little explored area, and that this work has been appreciated and probably resulted in Viatrovich's appointment a director of TsDVR (Centre for the Study of the Liberation Movement).

=== Army of the Immortals (2002) ===
His third book Army of the Immortals (2002) was discussed some years later on the Polit.ru website by Professor Alexei I. Miller of the Central European University in Budapest and Ukrainian historian Georgy Kasyanov from the National University of Kyiv-Mohyla Academy. In Miller's view the book was essentially glorification of the Organisation of Ukrainian Nationalists (OUN) and the Ukrainian Insurgent Army (UPA). Many historical sources were disregarded in the book's writing, says Miller, and falsified stories were cited. Viatrovych preferred to ignore all criticism of the Army of the Immortals that originated within the academic community, says Miller.

In 2013, similar concerns about discussion of the past, the role and influence of Volodymyr Viatrovych, and the impact of divergent views on the present were raised in a discussion following a Columbia University workshop on “Russian and Ukrainian Nationalism: Entangled Histories”

=== OUN Attitudes Towards the Jews (2006) ===
This book provides a one-sided view on the OUN's attitude towards Jews. The book portrays the Ukrainian nationalists and UPA as a "national liberation" movement and deny any accusations in their collaboration with Nazi Germany and involvement in the Holocaust. In his book Viatrovich presents only one critical article on OUN's anti-semitism, with the only purpose to immediately dismiss it.

John-Paul Himka and Taras Kurylo describe Viatrovich's methodology as follows:

V'iatrovych manages to exonerate the OUN of charges of antisemitism and complicity in the Holocaust only by employing a series of highly dubious procedures: rejecting sources that compromise the OUN, accepting uncritically censored sources from émigré OUN circles, failing to recognize antisemitism in OUN texts, limiting the source base to official OUN proclamations and decisions, excluding Jewish memoirs, refusing to consider contextual and comparative factors, failing to consult German document collections, and ignoring the mass of historical monographs on his subject written in the English and German languages.

Other authors agree that this book is an attempt to deny the crimes of Organization of Ukrainian Nationalists (OUN) on Jews and to dismiss the allegations of its anti-Semitism. In the opinion of Kurylo and Himka, this work does less to understanding history, but does much to distort it, however it contains an interesting material and forms the basis for further discussions on the relationship of the OUN and UPA to Jews.

As an example of alleged collaboration of Jews with UPA and as an evidence of the Ukrainian nationalist forces' lack of anti-semitism, Viatrovych mentions Leiba Dubrovskii, an alleged Jewish member of UPA and genuine Ukrainian nationalist. However, in reality Dubrovskii was a Soviet POW who concealed his ethnicity when was captured by Germans. He never disclosed his real ethnicity to UPA members and was no enthusiastic supporter of Ukrainian nationalism.

=== The Second Polish-Ukrainian War (2011) ===
In this book, Viatrovych portrays the Volhynia massacres as mutual bloodletting as a result of civil war rather than a coordinated campaign of ethnic cleansing by Ukrainian nationalists against Poles. In attempts to exonerate Ukrainian nationalists, Viatrovich presents the UPA's massacre of Polish civilians as a part of a military conflict, i.e. as a war between Poles and Ukrainians, which he calls The Second Polish-Ukrainian War, thereby implying that the events he describes were a continuation of the Polish-Ukrainian war (1918–19). Viatrovych tries to prove that there was no order of OUN's leadership for the extermination of the Polish minority, and the Volynia massacre was just a spontaneous rebellion of Ukrainian peasants provoked by the Poles. "The Second Polish-Ukrainian war" was met in West Ukraine with uncritical enthusiasm.

Most scholarly reviews of the book were highly critical, criticizing Viatrovych for whitewashing well-known Ukrainian nationalist crimes. The only exception to this pattern was Alexander J. Motyl. Ivan Katchanovski (University of Ottawa) states that the aim of Viatrovych in disseminating his narrative was to "restore Bandera's good name" mostly in the mass media and in non-academic or unscholarly publications. In the opinion of Hryciuk, the version of events presented in the book was factually untrue. Other reviews published in scholarly media by Per Anders Rudling, Grzegorz Rossoliński-Liebe, Andrzej Leon Sowa Ihor Ilyushyn, Andrii Portnov, Grzegorz Motyka, Andrzej Zięba, were also negative.

According to Motyka, although the book's sections devoted to the SS-Galizien Division and the fate of the Ukrainian population in Poland in the years 1945-1947 are of some value, the book as a whole is an unsuccessful work. This view is shared by Andrzej Sowa. In his review, Jared McBride noted the sharp contrast between good quality publications about Ukrainian nationalism published by Western scholars and Viatrovich's The Second Polish-Ukrainian War, which he characterised as "a myopic, poorly researched apology for Ukrainian nationalist violence."

Per Anders Rudling states that the monograph lacks any scholarly value, and would recommend The Second Polish-Ukrainian war only as a primary source for studying far-right historical negationism. He also stated that the Harvard Ukrainian Research Institute, which supported Viatrovich's work with Lebed's archives, "have good reason to ponder the implication of associating Harvard University with this sort of activism".

== Viatrovych as a public figure ==
In May 2016, in Foreign Policy Josh Cohen claimed that Viatrovych was "whitewashing Ukraine's past". In a reply published some weeks later Viatrovych assured Cohen and readers of Foreign Policy that Ukraine's history "was in good hands".

As head of the Ukrainian Institute of National Remembrance, he initiated a moratorium on the exhumation of Polish gravesites in Ukraine following a series of destructions of Ukrainian monuments in Poland, which the Polish government refused to restore despite obligations under the 1994 Polish-Ukrainian agreement.

== Publications ==
According to Andreas Umland, "Viatrovych did not have then and apparently still does not have any relevant peer-reviewed academic publications".

=== Monographs ===
- Lieutenant "Burlaka" (Sotennyi "Burlaka" - Сотенний "Бурлака"), 2000.
- UPA Raids on Czechoslovak territory (Rejdy UPA terenamy Chekhoslovachchyny - Рейди УПА теренами Чехословаччини), Lviv, 2001 (the subject of his 2004 Ph.D. thesis).
- The army of immortals: Insurgents in images (Armiia bezsmertnykh. Povstans'ki svitlyny - Армія безсмертних. Повстанські світлини), Lviv, 2002.
- OUN attitudes towards the Jews: Formulation of a position against the backdrop of a catastrophe (Stavlennia OUN do ievreiv: formuvannia pozycii na tli katastrofi - Ставлення ОУН до євреїв: формування позиції на тлі катастрофи), Lviv, 2006.
- Polish-Ukrainian relations, 1942-1947, in the documents of OUN and UPA (ed.) (Pol'sko-ukrains'ki stosunky v 1942-1947 rokakh u dokumentakh OUN ta UPA - Польсько-українські стосунки в 1942—1947 роках у документах ОУН та УПА), Lviv, 2011.
- The Second Polish-Ukrainian war. 1942-1947 (Druha pol'sko-ukrains'ka viina. 1942-1947 - Друга польсько-українська війна. 1942—1947), Kyiv, 2011; 2nd revised edition, 2012; Engl. transl. by K. Maryniak, publ. by Horner Press as The Gordian Knot: The Second Polish-Ukrainian War, 1942–1947, Toronto, 2019.
- History marked "Classified Material" (Istoriia z hryfom "Sekretno" - Історія з грифом "Секретно"), Kyiv, 2011.
- History marked "Classified Material": New subjects (Istoriia z hryfom "Sekretno": Novi siuzhety - Історія з грифом "Секретно": Нові сюжети), Kyiv, 2012.

=== Collective works ===
- V. Viatrovych, R. Hryc'kiv, I. Derevianyi, R. Zabilyi, A. Sova and P.Sodol', The Ukrainian Insurgent Army: a history of the undefeated (Ukrains'ka Povstans'ka Armiia: istoriia neskorenykh - В. В’ятрович, Р. Грицьків, І. Дерев’яний, Р. Забілий, А. Сова, П. Содоль. Українська Повстанська Армія: історія нескорених), Lviv, 2008. (digital version)

== Literature ==
- Rudling, Per Anders (November 2011). "The OUN, the UPA and the Holocaust: A Study in the Manufacturing of Historical Myths". The Carl Beck Papers in Russian and East European Studies. No. 2107. p. 28-30. ISSN 0889-275X.
- Cohen, Josh (2 May 2016). "The Historian Whitewashing Ukraine's Past". Foreign Policy.
- Viatrovych, Volodomyr (17 June 2016). "Ukraine's History Is in Good Hands". Foreign Policy. Reply to Josh Cohen.

== See also ==
- Leiba Dobrovskii
