= Ukrainian Institute of National Memory =

Ukrainian governmental institute

- Український інститут національної пам'яті
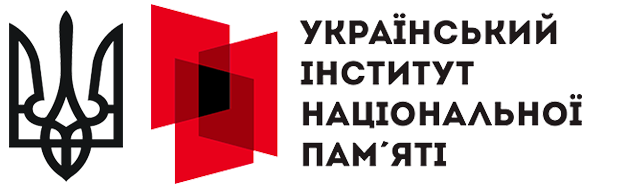
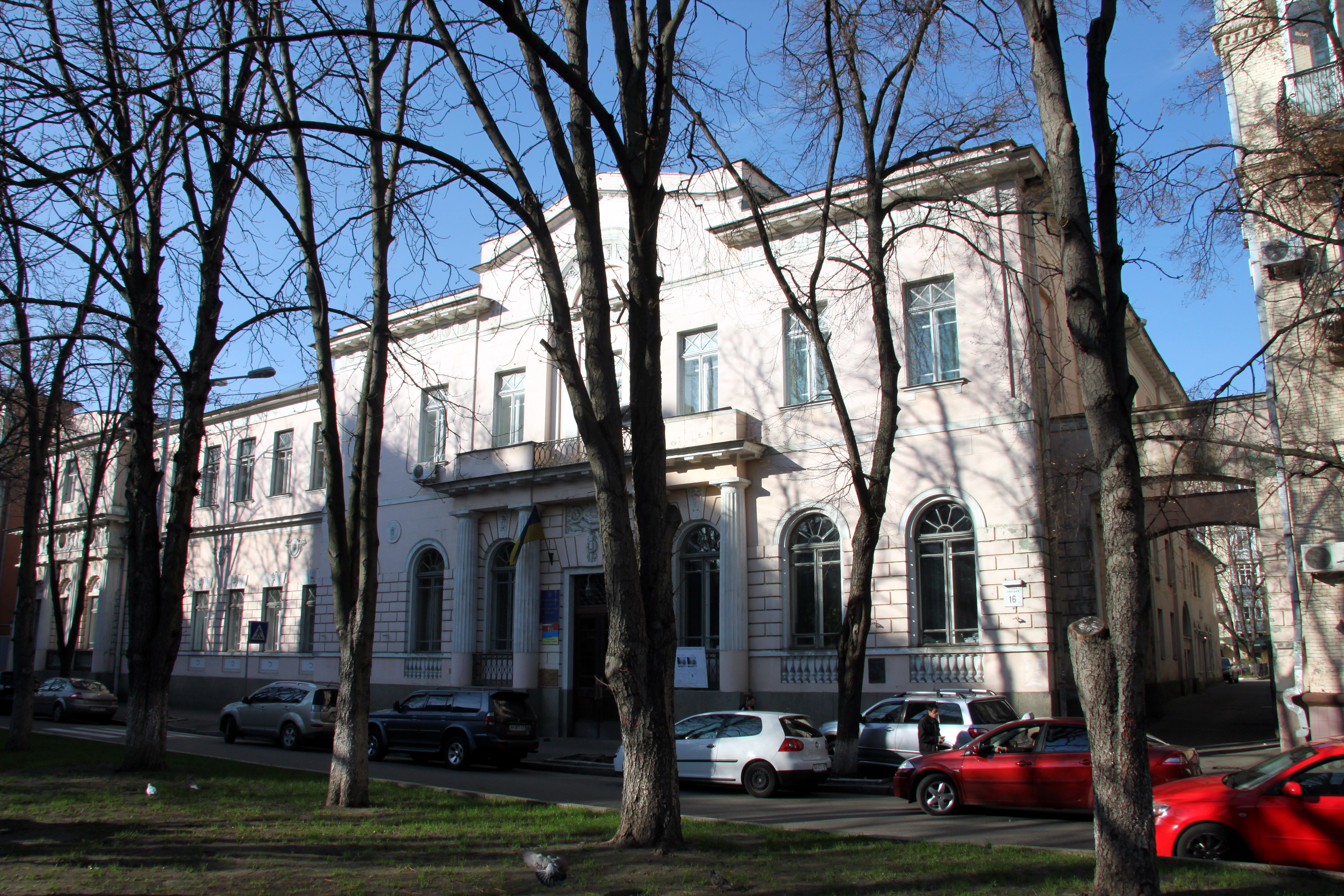
- Abbreviation: UINM
- Formation: 31 May 2006
- Headquarters: Kyiv, Ukraine
- Location: 16a Lypska Street, Kyiv
- Director: Oleksandr Alfiorov (as of June 2025)
- Website: uinp.gov.ua

The Ukrainian Institute of National Memory (UINM; Ukrainian: Український інститут національної пам'яті, romanized: Ukrainskyi instytut natsionalnoi pamiati), also translated as the Ukrainian Institute of National Remembrance, is a central executive body operating under the Cabinet of Ministers of Ukraine.

The Law of Ukraine "On the principles of state policy in respect to the national memory of Ukrainian people", which was adopted 21 August 2025, defines the institute as a central executive body with a special status, which provides the formation and realization of memorial policy.

A consultative centre dedicated to the search of information about victims of repression in Ukraine functions as part of the institute.

== History ==
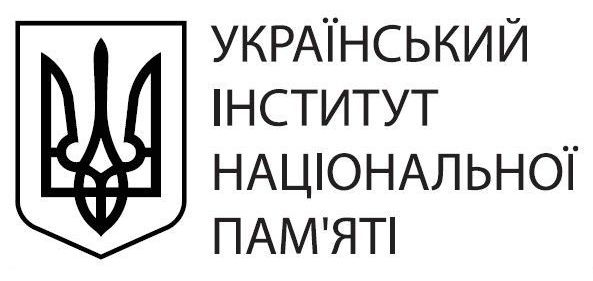
Logo of the institute (2014–2018)

The UINM was established on 31 May 2006 to restore and preserve the national memory of the Ukrainian people. From 2006 to 2010, the institute was a special status central governmental institution. From 2010 to 2014 it was a research budget institution.

On 9 December 2010, the UINM was discontinued by a decree issued by the Ukrainian president Viktor Yanukovych. On the same day the Cabinet of Ministers of Ukraine created the Ukrainian Institute of National Remembrance as a research institution, under the financial control of the Cabinet of Ministers of Ukraine.

== Directors ==
- Ihor Yukhnovskyi (22 May 2006 to 18 July 2010)
- Valeriy Soldatenko (19 July 2010 to 24 March 2014)
- Volodymyr Viatrovych (25 March 2014 to 18 September 2019) (Note: Viatrovych was the former head of the archives of the Security Service of Ukraine, who had been responsible for declassifying KGB documents.)
- Alina Shpak as acting director (18 September to 4 December 2019)
- Anton Drobovych (4 December 2019 to 13 December 2024) (Note: Drobovych was the former head of educational programs at the Babyn Yar Holocaust Memorial Centre.)
- Yuliia Hnatiuk as acting director (21 December 2024 to 27 June 2025)
- Oleksandr Alfiorov, (since 27 June 2025)

== Decommunization of Ukraine ==
In May 2015, President Petro Poroshenko signed four laws concerning decommunization in Ukraine. Viatrovych was involved in the drafting of two of these laws. The criminal sentences imposed by these acts and their phrasing came in for criticism within the country and abroad. The law "On access to the archives of repressive bodies of the communist totalitarian regime from 1917–1991" placed the state archives concerning repression during the Soviet period under the jurisdiction of the Ukrainian Institute of National Remembrance.

== Archive ==
A law creating the Branch State Archive of the Institute of National Memory was adopted on 21 May 2015. In June 2019 the archive was registered as a legal entity and moved to its premises in a building previously used by the National Bank of Ukraine. In 2021 the archive became a member of the Platform of European Memory and Conscience.

== Criticism ==
In 2015, David R. Marples initiated an open letter addressed to President Poroshenko, calling on him not to sign the so-called anti-communism law, and the law honouring the “heroes of the nation”. This letter was signed by historians that included Omer Bartov, Mark von Hagen, John-Paul Himka and Per Anders Rudling. In response, the head of the Ukrainian Institute of National Memory, Volodymyr Viatrovych, described the mass murders of Poles and Jews by the Organisation of Ukrainian Nationalists and Ukrainian Insurgent Army, as "only one of the opinions that has the right to exist" and accused the signatories of spreading Soviet propaganda. Poroshenko signed the law anyway.

According to the historian Georgiy Kasianov, the Institute of National Memory from 2015 was under control of Ukrainian nationalist forces, specifically the Centre for Liberation Movement Studies. These forces, which were not popular in Ukraine and which never managed well in general elections, suddenly received a significant instrument to influence Ukrainian education and politics. This influence was blown up by Russian propagandists; it was used as one of the pretexts of the Russian invasion of Ukraine.

According to the political scientist Andreas Umland, the memorial policy promoted by the institute contributed to the weakening of Ukraine's international position. The Ukrainian political analyst Mykola Riabchuk has argued, that such views overestimate the importance of the institution, which doesn't possess a monopoly on the memorial sphere in Ukraine and de facto operates on par with Ukrainian, and foreign media and a large part of the population, which support anti-nationalist views.

== See also ==
- Institute of National Remembrance (Poland)
- National Memory Institute (Slovakia)

== Bibliography ==
- Kasianov, Georgiy (2022). Memory Crash. Politics of History in and around Ukraine, 1980s–2010s (PDF). Budapest: Central European University Press. pp. 121–145. doi:10.7829/9789633863817. ISBN 978-963-386-381-7.
- Marples, David R. (2018). "Decommunization, Memory Laws, and "Builders of Ukraine in the 20th Century" (PDF). Acta Slavica Iaponica. 39 (1): 1–22.
- McBride, Jarred (2015-08-13). "How Ukraine's New Memory Commissar Is Controlling the Nation's Past". The Nation.
- Rudling, Per Anders (2021). "Managing Memory in Post-Soviet Ukraine: From "Scientific Marxism-Leninism" to the Ukrainian Institute of National Memory, 1991–2019". Journal of Soviet and Post-Soviet Politics and Society. 7 (2): 85–136.
- Umland, Andreas (2017). "The Ukrainian Government's Memory Institute Against the West. Band 2017". IndaStra. 2017 (3).
