= Statue of Lenin in Kharkiv =

Former monument in Kharkiv, Ukraine

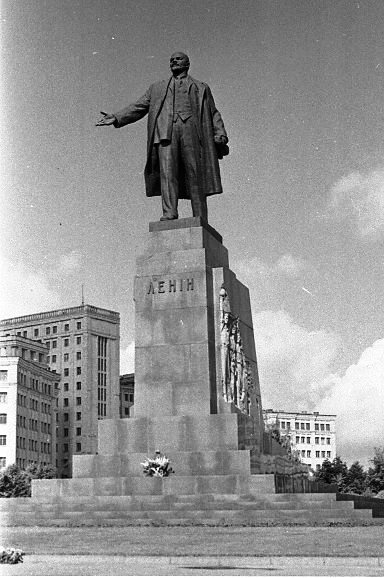
- Monument to Lenin in then-named Dzerzhinsky Square (now Freedom Square) in 1973
- Interactive map of Statue of Lenin in Kharkiv
- Location: Kharkiv, Ukraine
- Coordinates: 50°00′17″N 36°13′52″E
- Designer: Alexander Sidorenko
- Material: Granite, Bronze
- Length: 720 m (2,360 ft)
- Width: 125 m (410 ft)
- Beginning date: 5 November 1963
- Opening date: November 1964
- Dedicated to: Vladimir Lenin
- Dismantled date: 28 September 2014
- Status: Ukrainian decommunization laws forbid rebuilding the monument.

The Statue of Lenin in Kharkiv was a sculpture monument to Vladimir Lenin, located in Freedom Square, Kharkiv, Ukraine, that was toppled and demolished in 2014. It was the largest monument to Lenin in Ukraine, designed by Alexander Sidorenko after entering an open competition to design the monument in 1963, in the lead up to the anniversary of the October Revolution.

The monument ID was 63-101-0682.

== Description ==
The statue was composed of Lenin, gesturing towards the Kharkiv Regional Administration Building with his right hand and holding a crumpled cartouche in his left, atop a pedestal. The pedestal included two bas-reliefs: on one side a worker, sailor, and soldier under the Red Flag, and on the other a worker, a collective farmer, and a scientist who raised a model artificial satellite above his head. In the middle, the plinth was mainly empty, except for the inscription of Lenin's name in Ukrainian, held on by steel pins at its feet.

== History ==
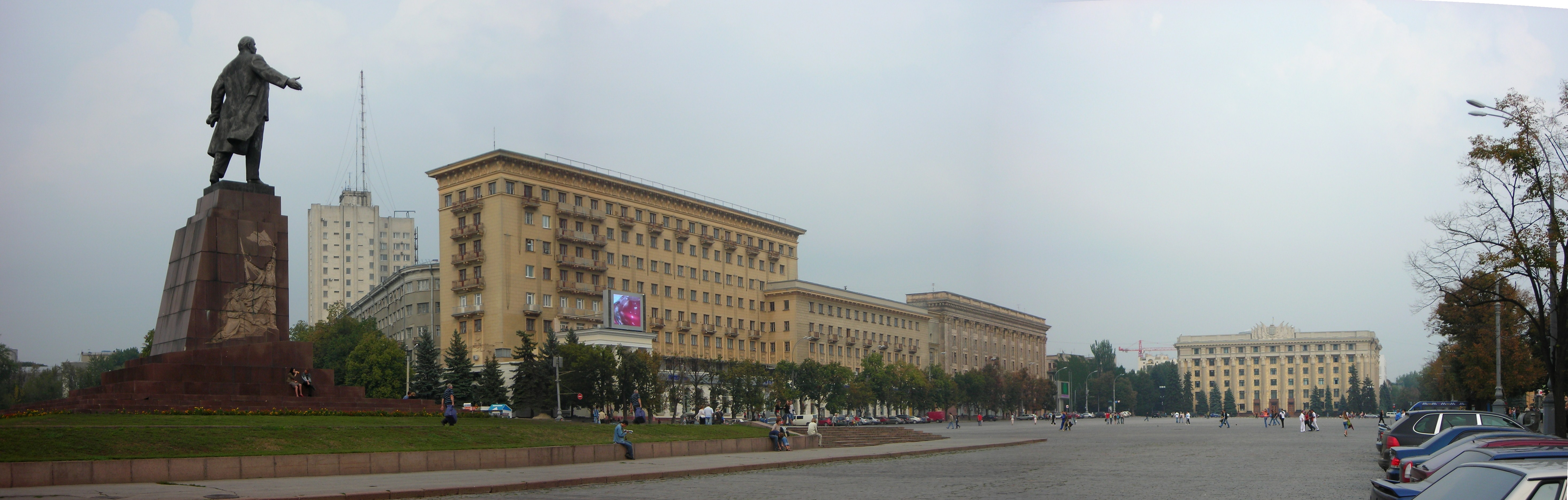
The statue pointing to the Kharkiv Regional Administration Building, in September 2007

The monument was placed and planned by the Kharkiv City Council through the memorandum placed to build the sculpture on the square in 1963. The commission was accounted by sculptor Alexander Sidorenko and the building was commissioned by Oleksiy Oliynyk and Makar Vronsky. The monument was opened in November 1964, the eve of the October Revolution festivities in the USSR.

After the collapse of the USSR and restoration of the independence of Ukraine, many activists, politicians, and individuals called for the destruction of the sculpture, to remove a remnant of the totalitarian Soviet era in the area.

By order of the Ministry of Culture No. 468 of 30 May 2013, the monument was entered in the State Register of Immovable Landmarks of Ukraine as a monument of monumental art of local significance, protection number 27-Ha.

=== Euromaidan and Revolution of Dignity ===
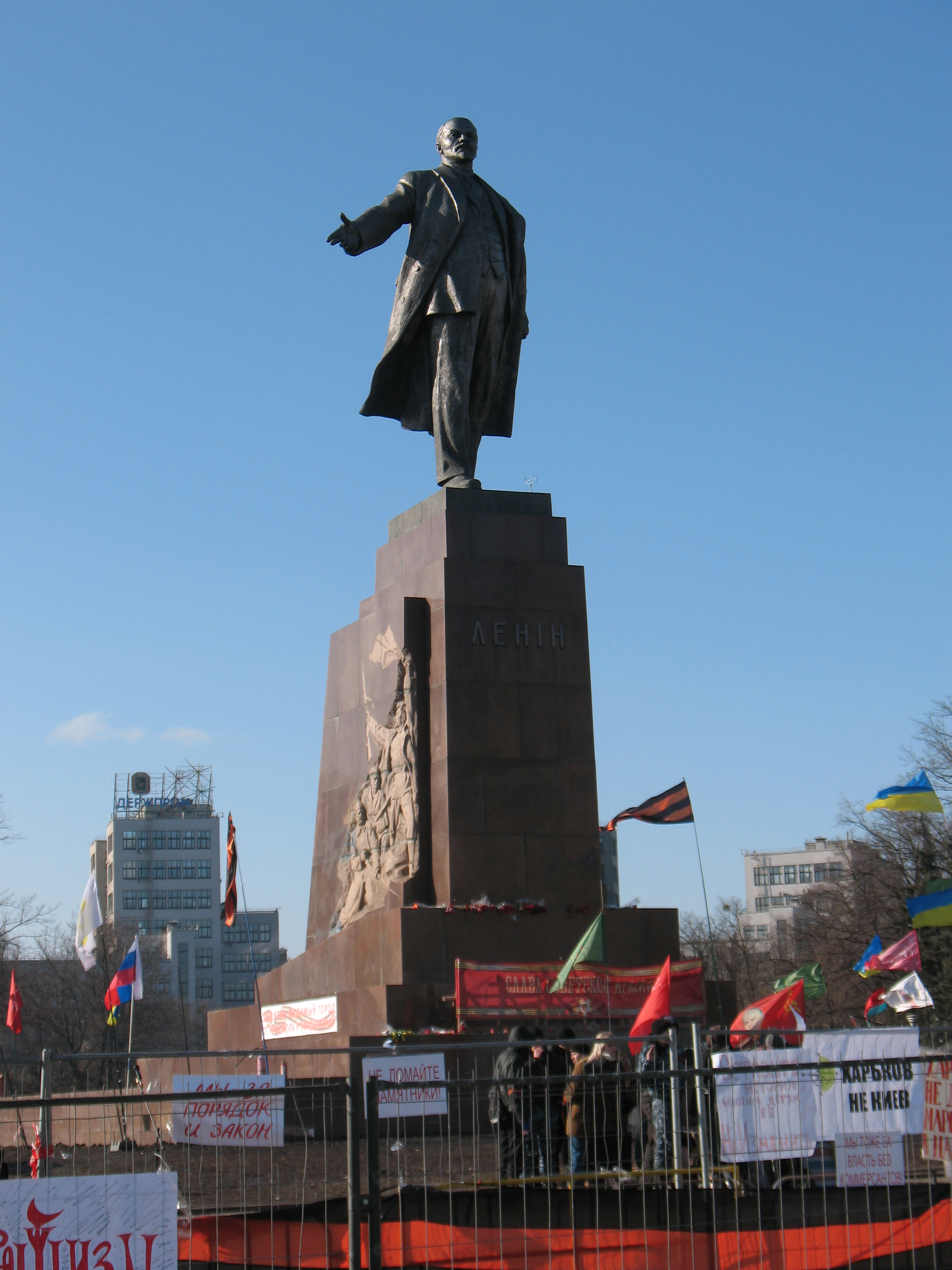
The monument on 22 February 2014, surrounded by protesters with Soviet and Russian flags, intending to protect it.

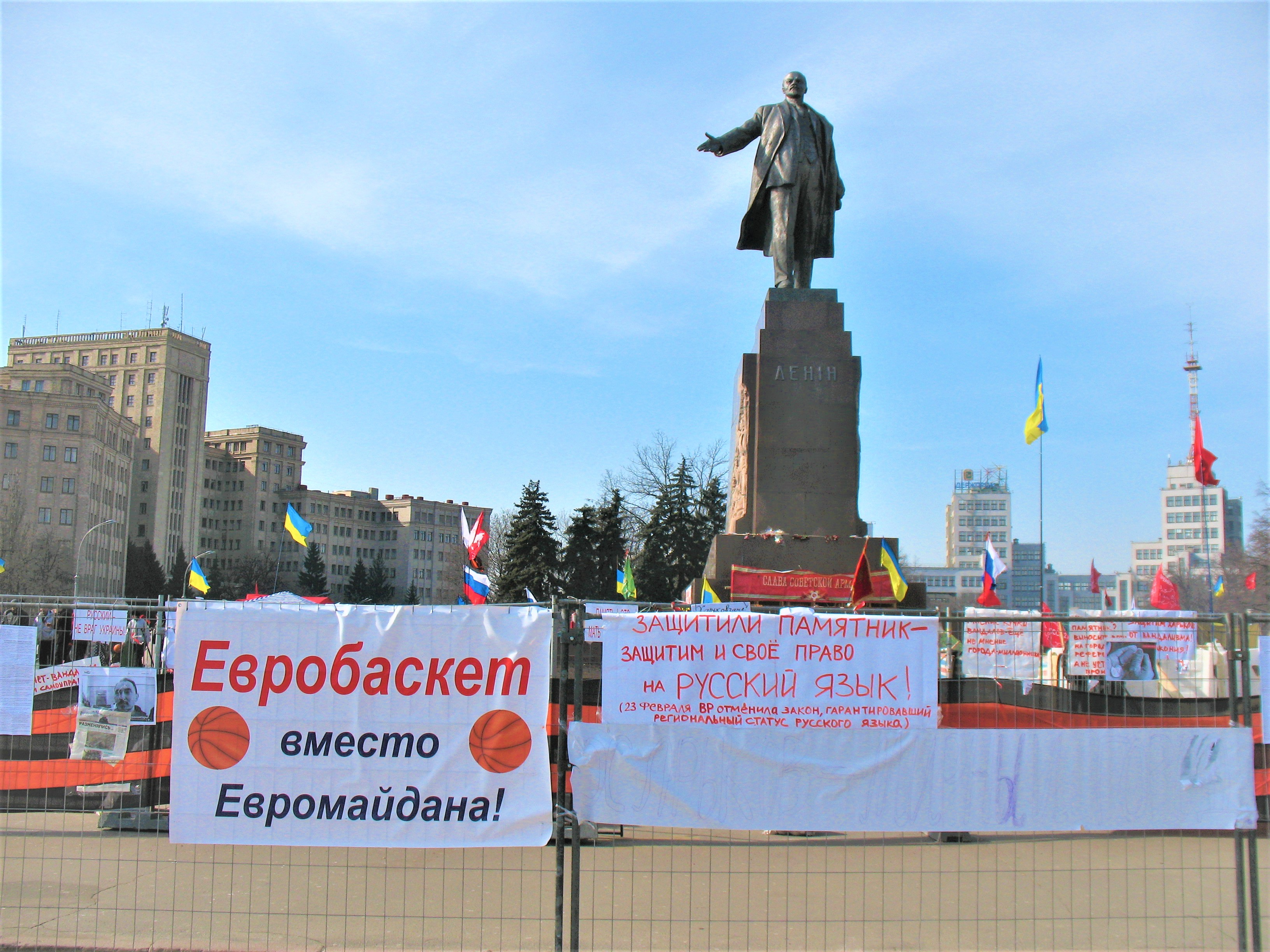
Pro-Russian demonstrations beneath the statue on 28 February 2014

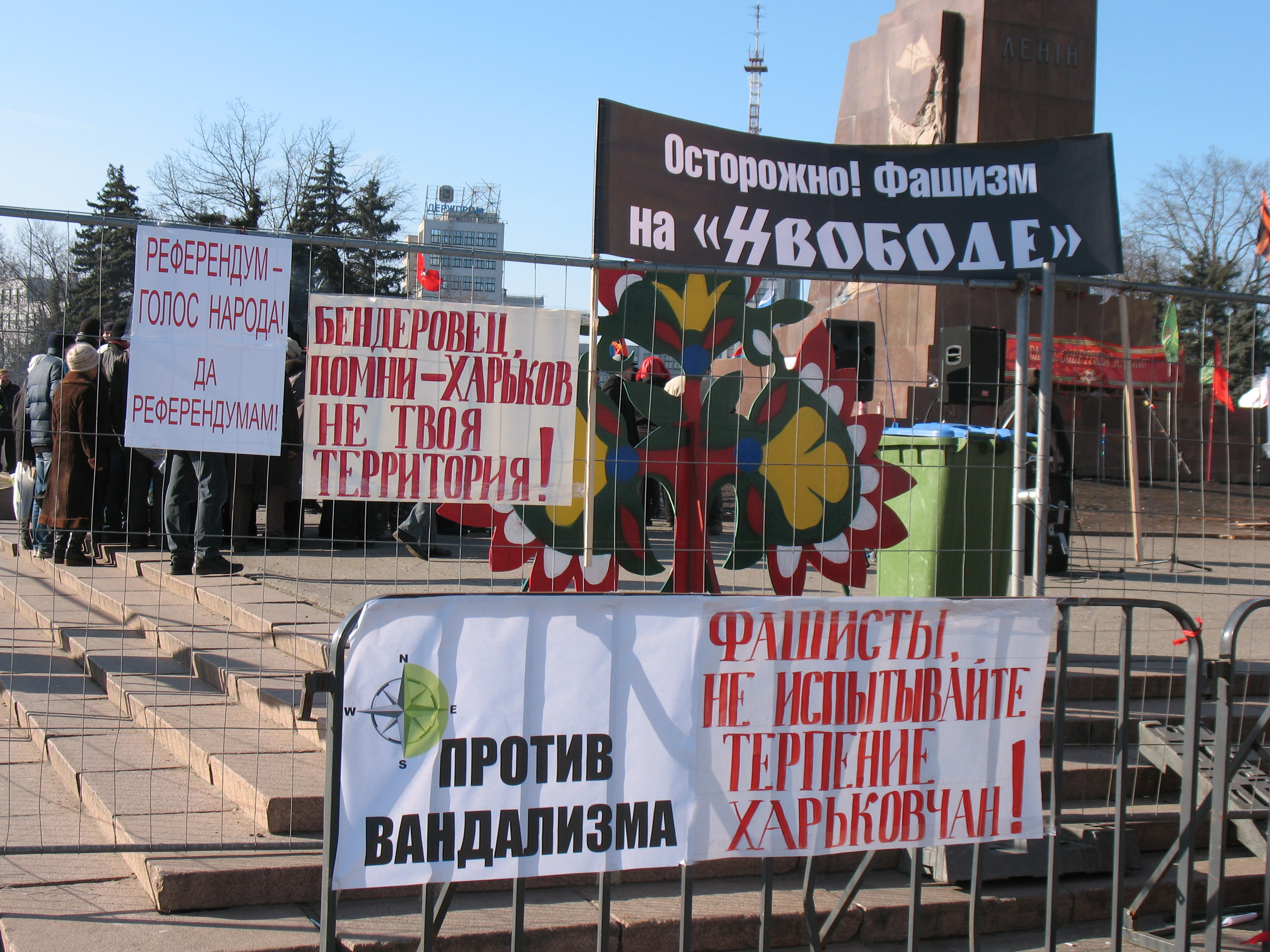
Pro-Russian signs around the statue bearing the words "Against vandalism", "Fascists, don't test the patience of Kharkov citizens!", "Caution! Fascism is set free!" and "Banderites! REMEMBER – KHARKOV IS NOT YOUR TERRITORY."

During the Euromaidan events in Ukraine on 22 February 2014, after thousands of Euromaidan activists marched from the Palace of Sports to Freedom Square, there were discussions about the mass demolition of the monument and all other insignias of the Soviet past. During the discussion, it was decided to demolish the monument after a decision in the Verkhovna Rada of Ukraine.

Groups of Kharkiv residents who identified themselves as the "St George's Ribbon" movement called for pro-Russian inhabitants and Anti-Maidan activists to defend the monument and organised round-the-clock protection. The Mayor of Kharkiv Hennadiy Kernes opposed the toppling of the monument.

Several months later, in the evening of 21 September 2014, Right Sector activists painted the monument and burned the St George's ribbons that remained there. The next day, the inscriptions were erased by utility workers.

=== Demolition ===
On 28 September 2014, a pro-Ukrainian march and rally was held in Kharkiv under the slogan "Kharkiv is Ukraine" with the participation of about 5,000 people. After the pro-Ukrainian action, most of its participants (about 3,000) gathered in Freedom Square and began to demolish the monument to Lenin. Participants included fighters of the Azov Battalion and activists of the Eastern Corps, Public Guard, Kharkiv Euromaidan, and Kharkiv Ultras.

Initially, it was planned to saw the monument in parts with the help of a car lift, and in particular to saw off the head and hands. But the police did not allow special equipment to the monument and blocked all entrances to the square. At the same time, activists with the flag of the Azov Battalion drilled the inscription "Glory to Ukraine" into the monument with a perforator, at about 19:00 UTC+2.

During the action to demolish the monument to Lenin, the pedestal was mined and inspected, but the report on the demining turned out to be false. In addition, according to Adviser to the Minister of Internal Affairs Anton Gerashchenko, law enforcement officers surrounded Freedom Square during the demolition of the monument to Lenin in order to prevent armed provocations.

During the first attempt to demolish the monument, the cable broke, injuring one of the activists. After this, the monument's legs continued to be sawn, and climbing ropes were replaced with steel ropes. One man who tried to harm this process was beaten by pro-Ukrainian activists.

At about 10:30 pm, activists tied two ropes to the figures and pulled them down and knocked down the monument to Lenin on Freedom Square in Kharkiv. After that, a crowd of people rushed to the monument, lighting fireworks and smoke bombs, as well as greeting each other shouting "Glory to Ukraine" once more. Kharkivites also tried to seize a piece of the monument as a souvenir. In total, the process of demolition of the monument took about four hours. Activists set Ukrainian flags in the shoes of the statue of Lenin that remained on the pedestal.

The sculpture was severely damaged, with the remaining pieces being just a torso without one arm, the head, the front abdomen, and the boots. The remains of the statue of Lenin were transported to the Malyshev plant and the Kharkiv regional highway near the ring road.

==== Aftermath ====
Initially, the police opened a criminal investigation into the attempt to topple the monument to Lenin under Part 2 of Article 298 (destruction, destruction or damage to cultural heritage sites) of the Criminal Code of Ukraine.

However, a few hours after the demolition, the city's official website published an order signed by the Governor of Kharkiv Oblast, Ihor Baluta, in which he “instructed the relevant structures to take measures to exclude the monument to Lenin, located on Svoboda Square in Kharkov, from the register of historical and cultural monuments, and also to take measures for the dismantling of the monument". Baluta then signed an order about "settling the situation regarding monuments to totalitarianism", according to which he decided to take urgent measures to dismantle the monument and remove it from the State Register of Immovable Monuments of Ukraine. On the basis of this order, the Minister of Internal Affairs Arsen Avakov announced the termination of the criminal proceedings regarding the damage to the monument. The next day, the Kharkiv police officially announced the termination of the criminal proceedings.

On 29 September 2014, the head of the Kharkiv Regional State Administration Ihor Baluta noted that the fall of the monument did not damage the structure of the subway system.

Later, activists of the Kharkiv public organization IT Sector offered to the mayor to exchange the sculpture's nose for an armoured personnel carrier or a T-80 tank for the Azov Volunteer Battalion, saying that otherwise they will hold an auction for the nose. Lenin's 35 kg ear from the monument was also put up for auction, and was exchanged for a thermal imager for the Kharkiv Territorial Defence Battalion.

On the morning of 4 October 2014, a cross 3.5 m high, 1.5 m wide, and over 100 kg in weight was installed on the top of the pedestal, with the inscriptions "Save and Preserve" and "Put a cross on Lenin", which stood temporarily.

In April 2015 a Kharkiv Court ruled that the destruction of the monument had not been illegal since, on 28 September 2014, then Governor of Kharkiv Oblast Ihor Baluta had decreed that the monument should be removed. In this court case, the Kharkiv City Council attempted to declare this decree by Baluta to have been illegal.

In November 2015, Kharkiv Mayor Hennadiy Kernes officially admitted that because of Ukrainian decommunization laws, the statue of Lenin could not be rebuilt. According to him, it was planned for architects, artists, and the city council to decide how to give Freedom Square a "European appearance" in the near future. Radio Free Europe reported that Kernes would be pushing for the building of a "modern fountain", similar to one that used to be located at the same spot as the toppled Lenin statue.

The pedestal and foundation of the statue were dismantled and removed in April 2016. In August 2016, pavers were laid on the site where the statue of Lenin stood. On 8 August 2016, the First Deputy Mayor of Kharkiv, Ihor Terekhov, stated that "Nothing will be built in place of a Lenin monument, signifying the square's return to its original image."

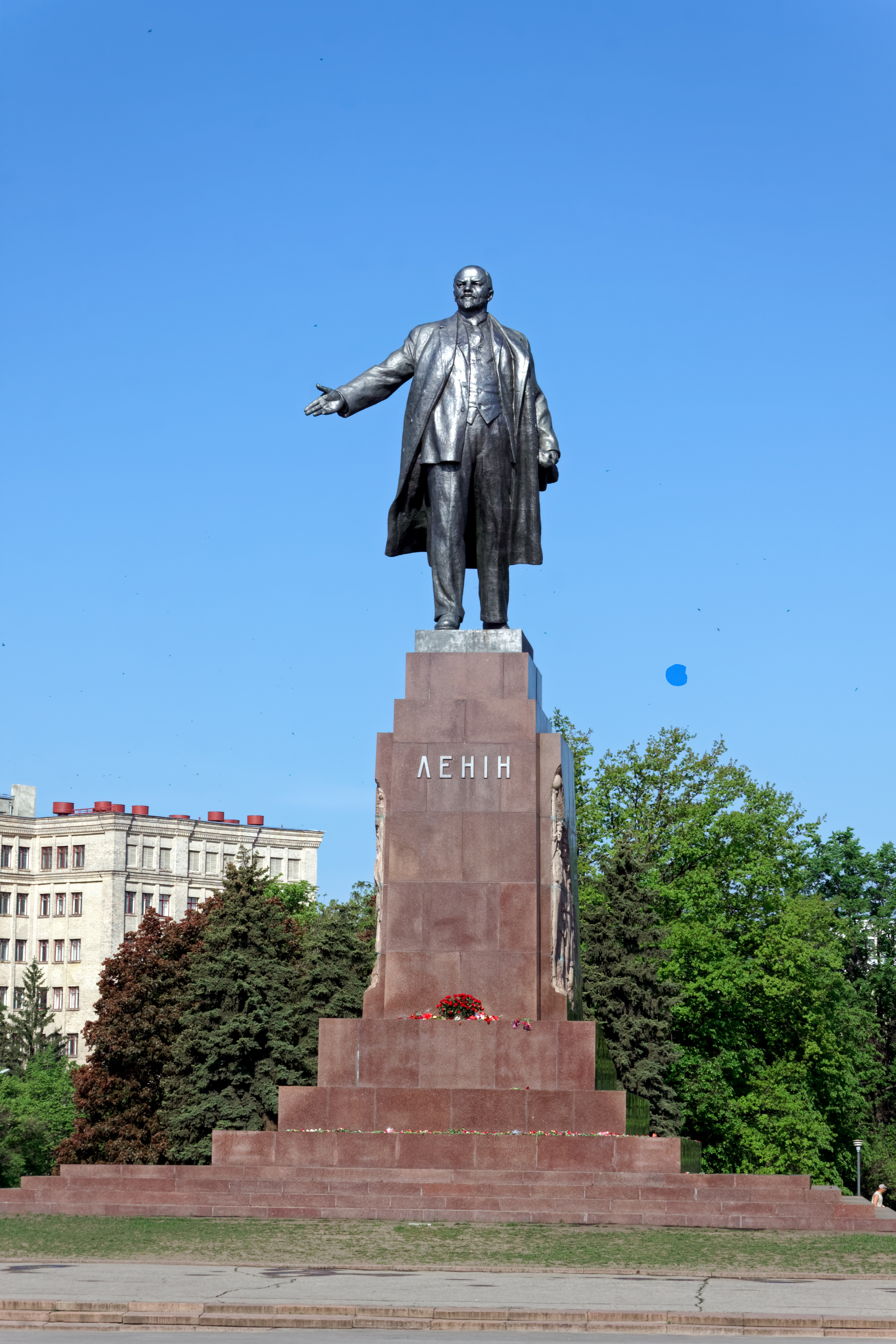
Monument prior to demolition in 2010

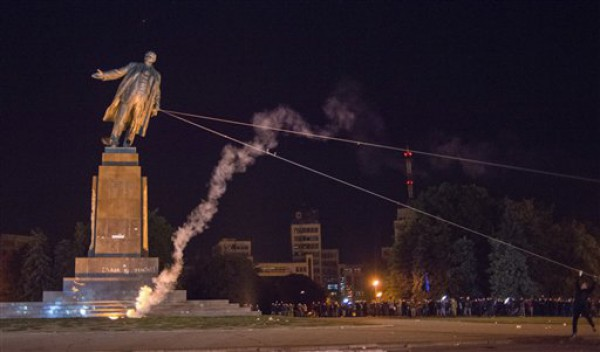
The statue in the process of being toppled

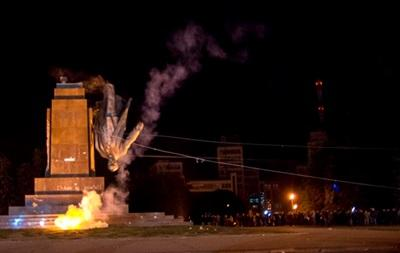
The moment when the statue was toppled

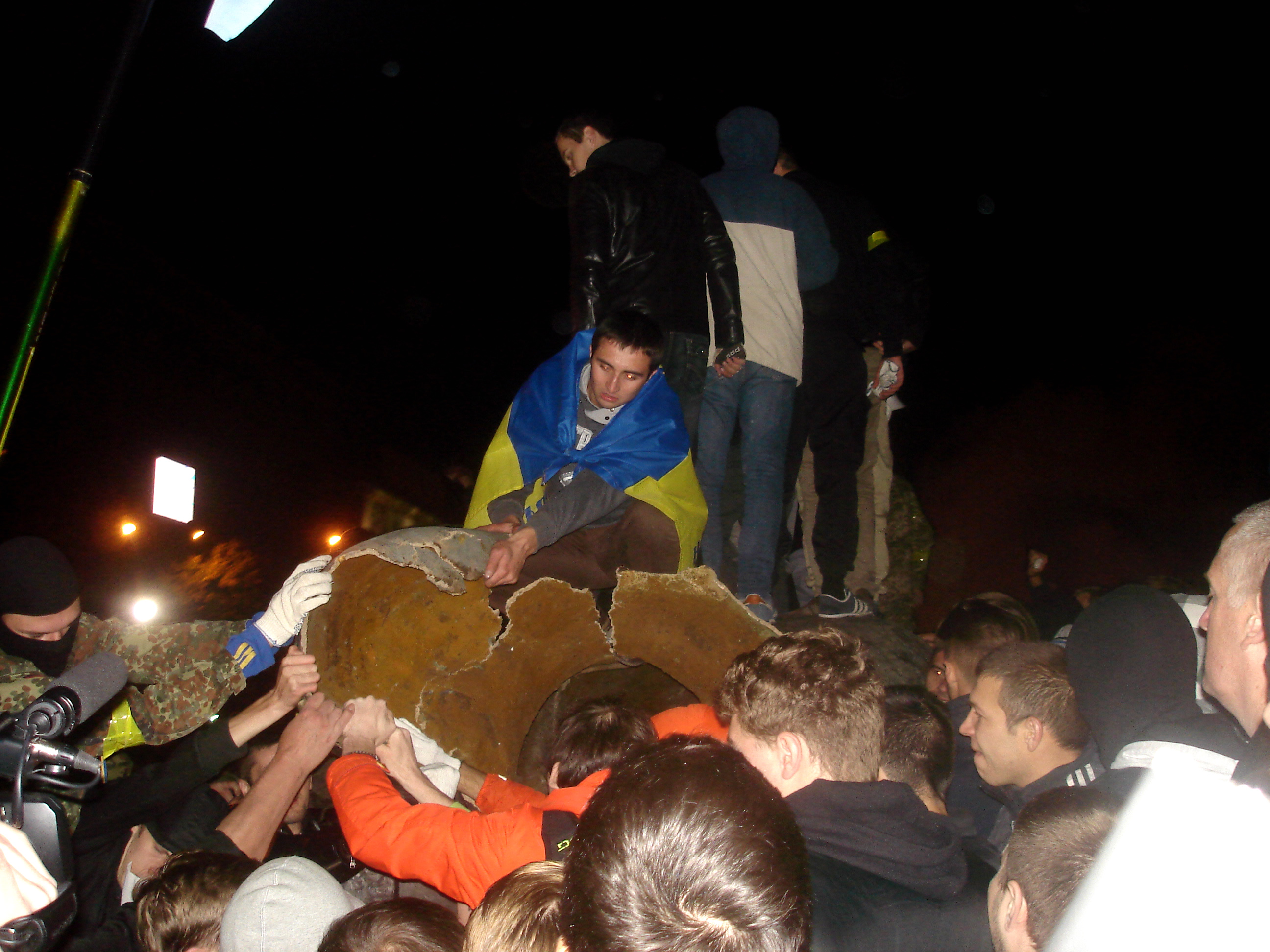
Protesters take pieces of the bronze statue after it was toppled

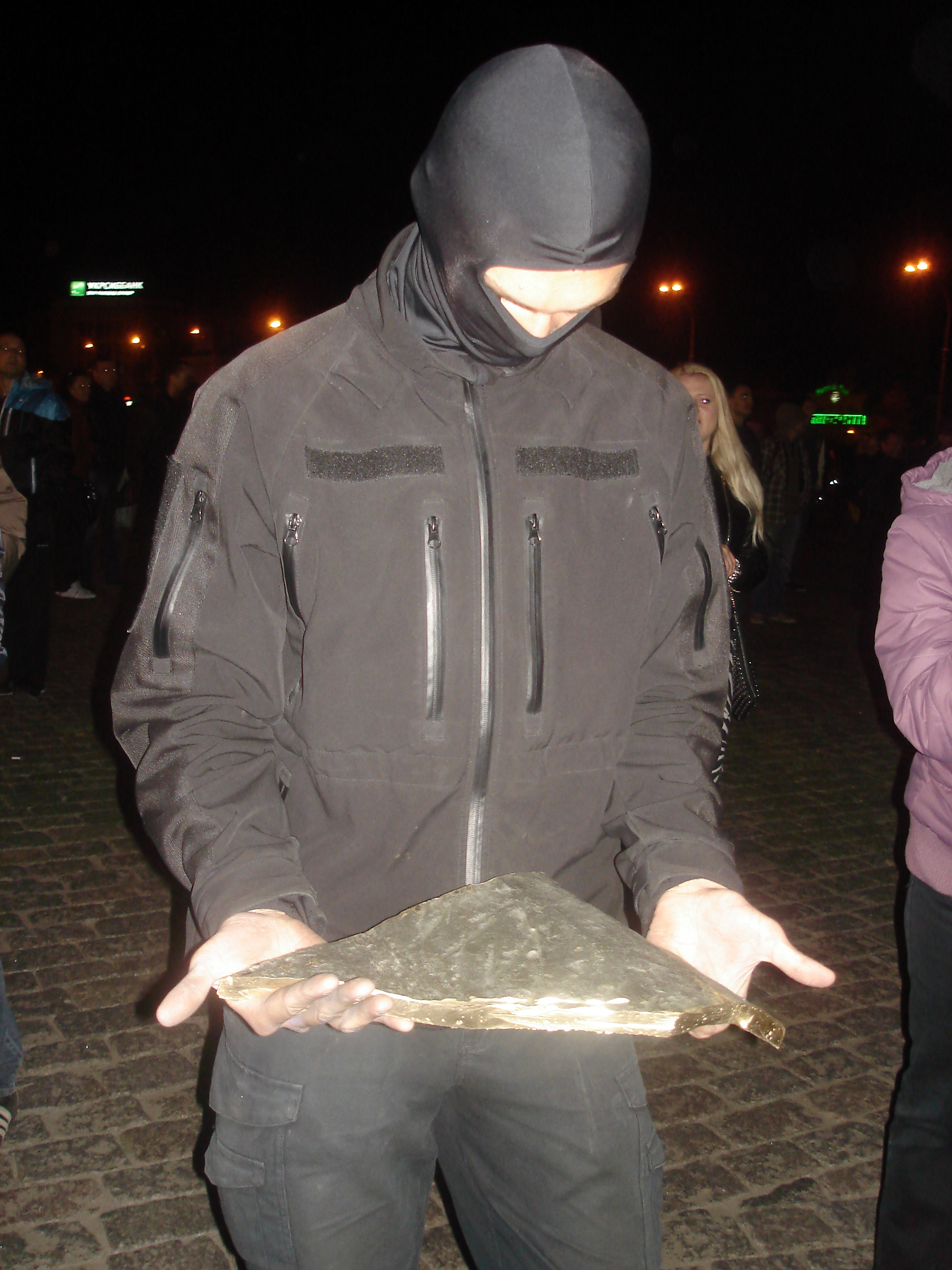
The first piece is taken as a souvenir by an unknown man

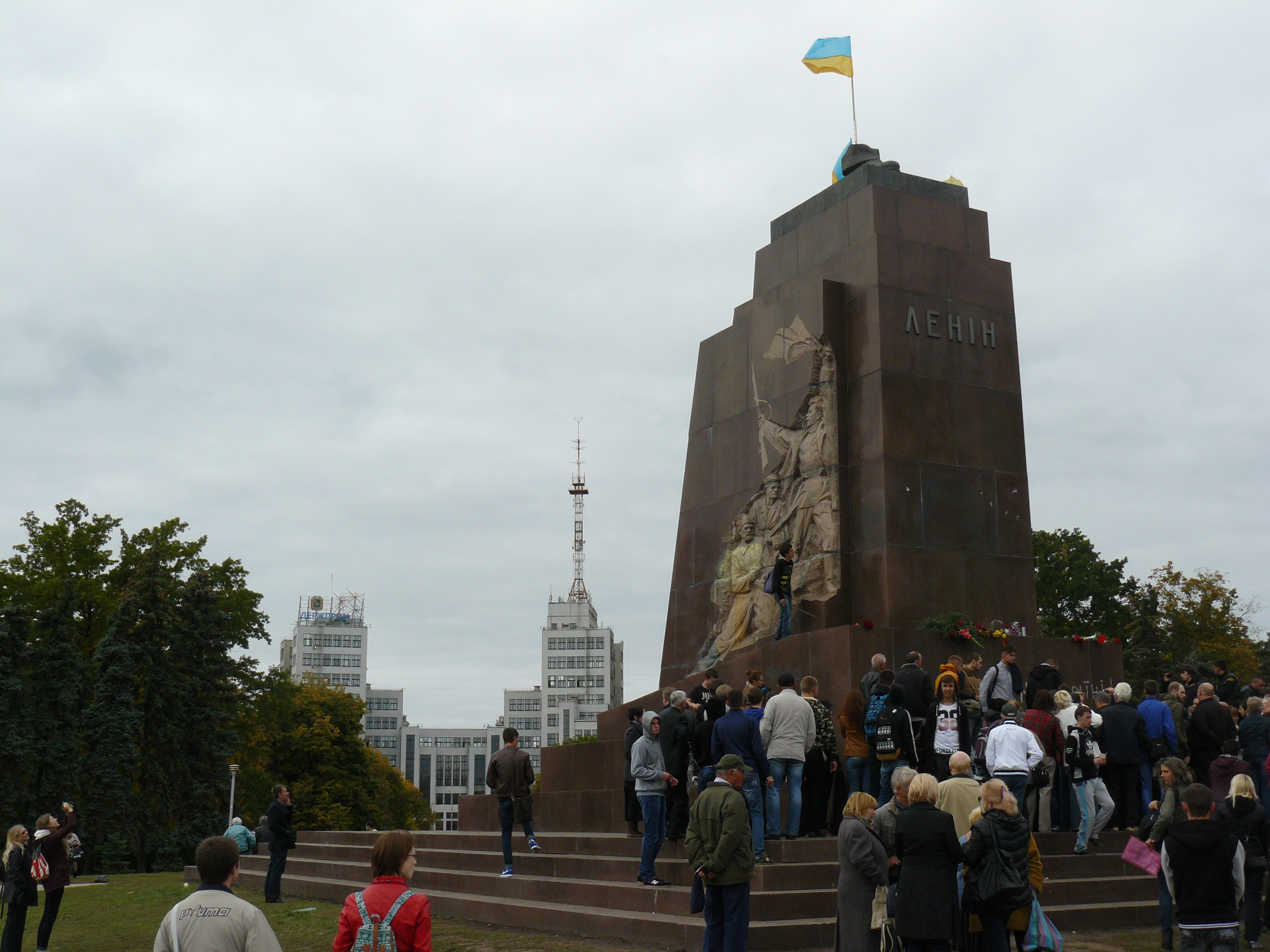
The vacant plinth on 29 September 2014

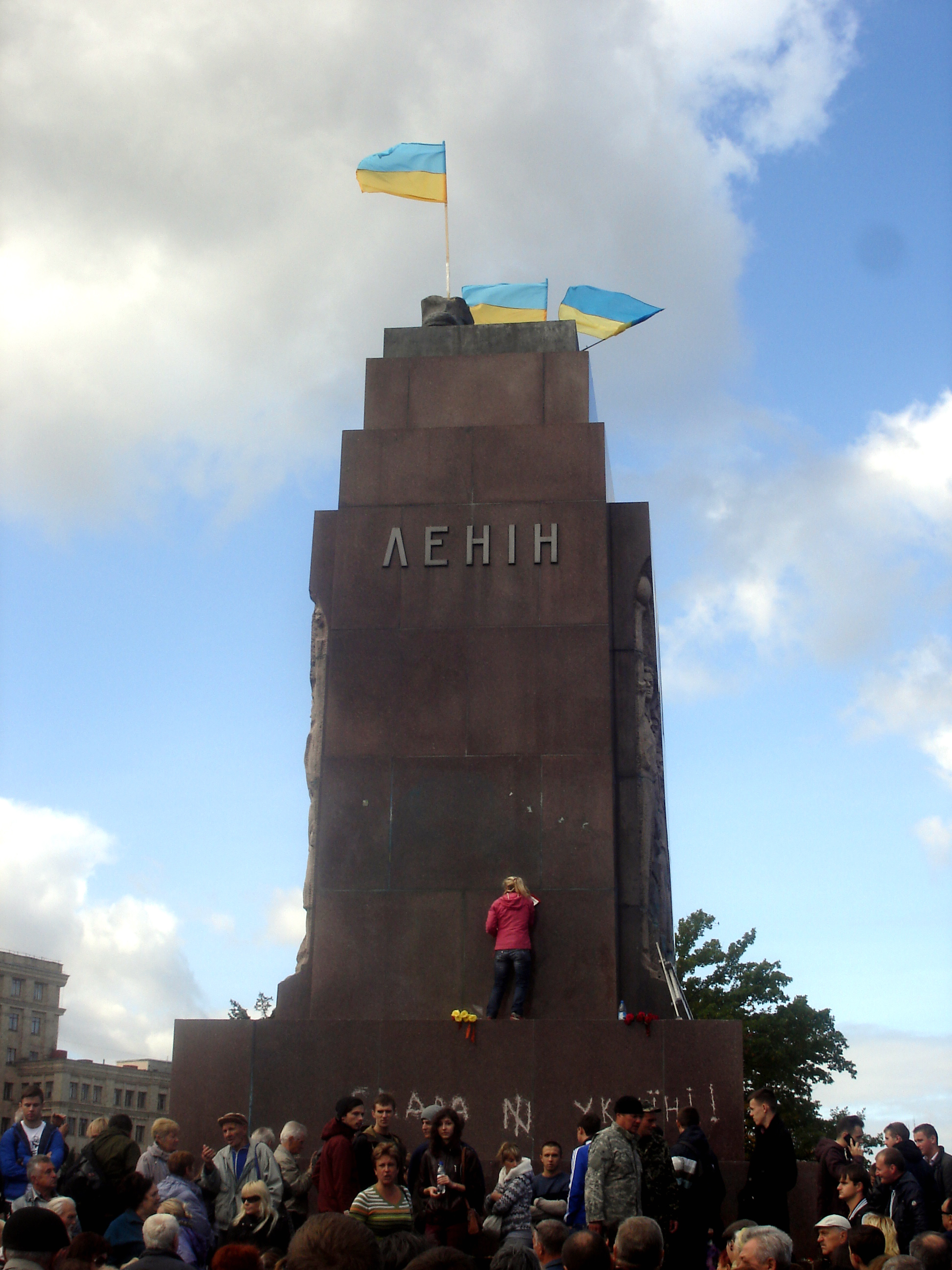
The vacant plinth on 29 September 2014

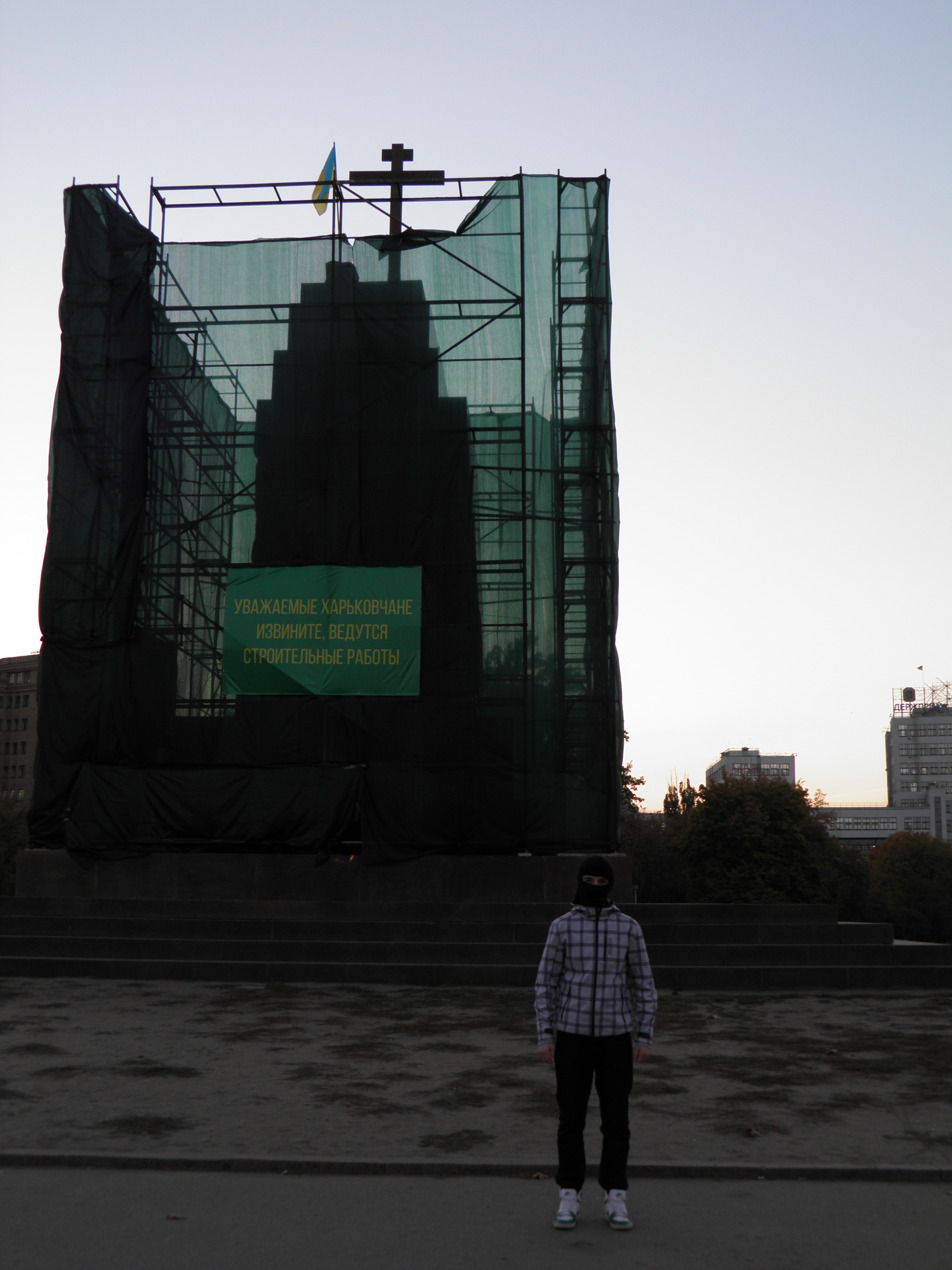
The dismantled Lenin statue on 7 October 2014. A cross and a Ukrainian flag are visible.

== Replacement fountain ==
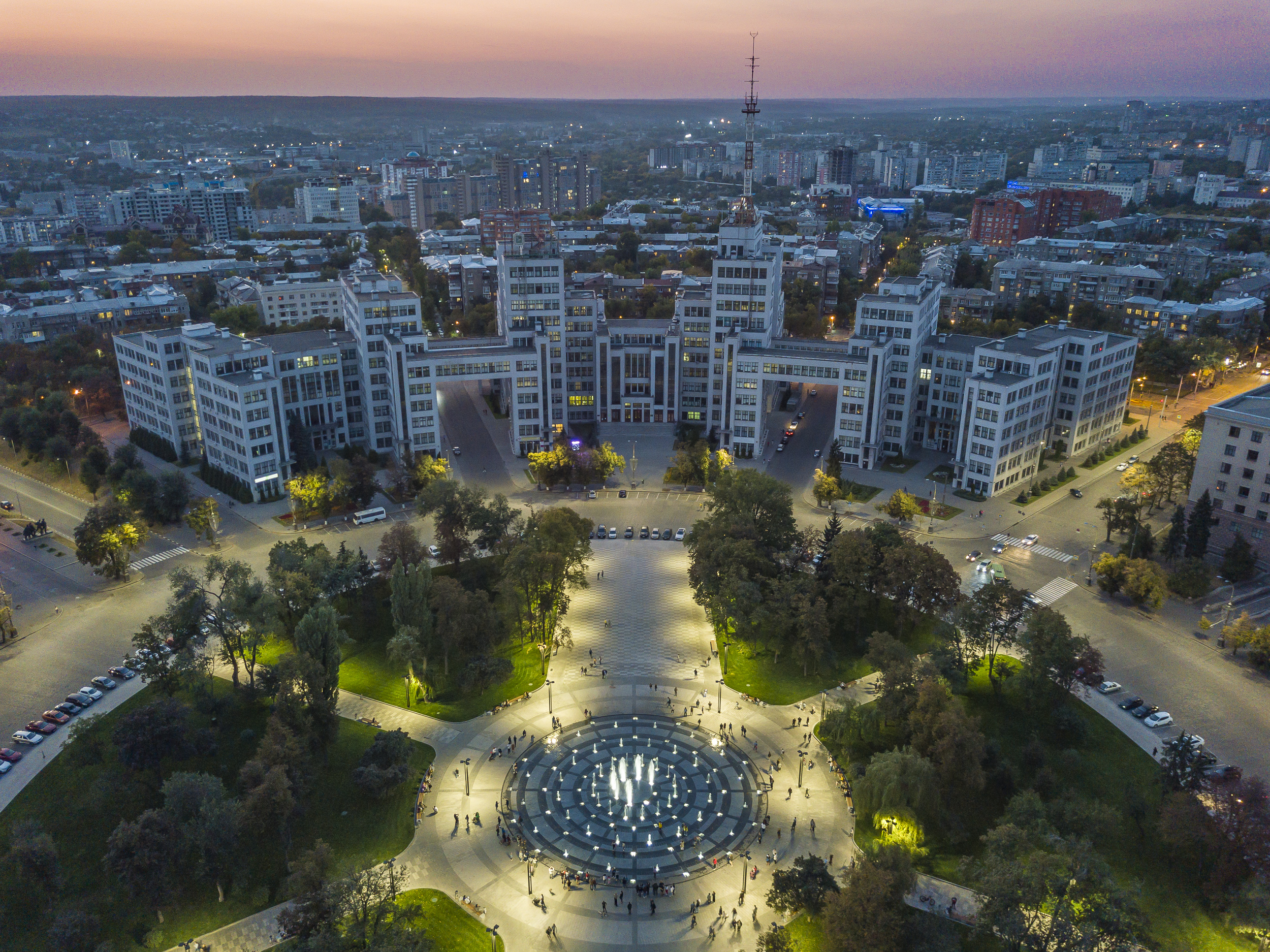
Modern fountain at opposite end of the park

After an open competition, it was decided on 3 February 2017 that Freedom Square would get a new 86 m tall monument. At its top, there was planned to be an angel with an Orthodox cross watching over four figures who somehow resonate with the history of Slobozhanshchina (Anacharsis, Igor Svyatoslavich, Semen Hulak-Artemovsky, and Mykhailo Petrenko). After the monument had been approved, residents in Kharkiv expressed opposition to the competition. According to them, the designed sculpture didn't fit in the context of the square, obliterating the symbolic value of the space. A petition demanding to cancel the decision on installing the column was registered on the official website of the Kharkiv City Council and more than 5000 people voted, establishing the minimum number for the Kharkiv City Council to give an official answer to the request. This petition was supported by Docomomo International.

The 86 m high monument was never built and on 17 April 2020, at a session of the Kharkiv City Council, Kharkiv Mayor Kernes announced that a new fountain would appear at the former site of the statue. This fountain was opened as the largest fountain in Ukraine, with a diameter of 36 meters, on 23 August 2020, Kharkiv's City Day. However, it is situated at the opposite end of Freedom Square, at a more central location.

== See also ==
- Demolition of monuments to Vladimir Lenin in Ukraine
- List of statues of Vladimir Lenin
- 2014 pro-Russian unrest in Ukraine § Kharkiv Oblast
