= Statue of Lenin in Bila Tserkva =

- Пам'ятник В.І.Леніну
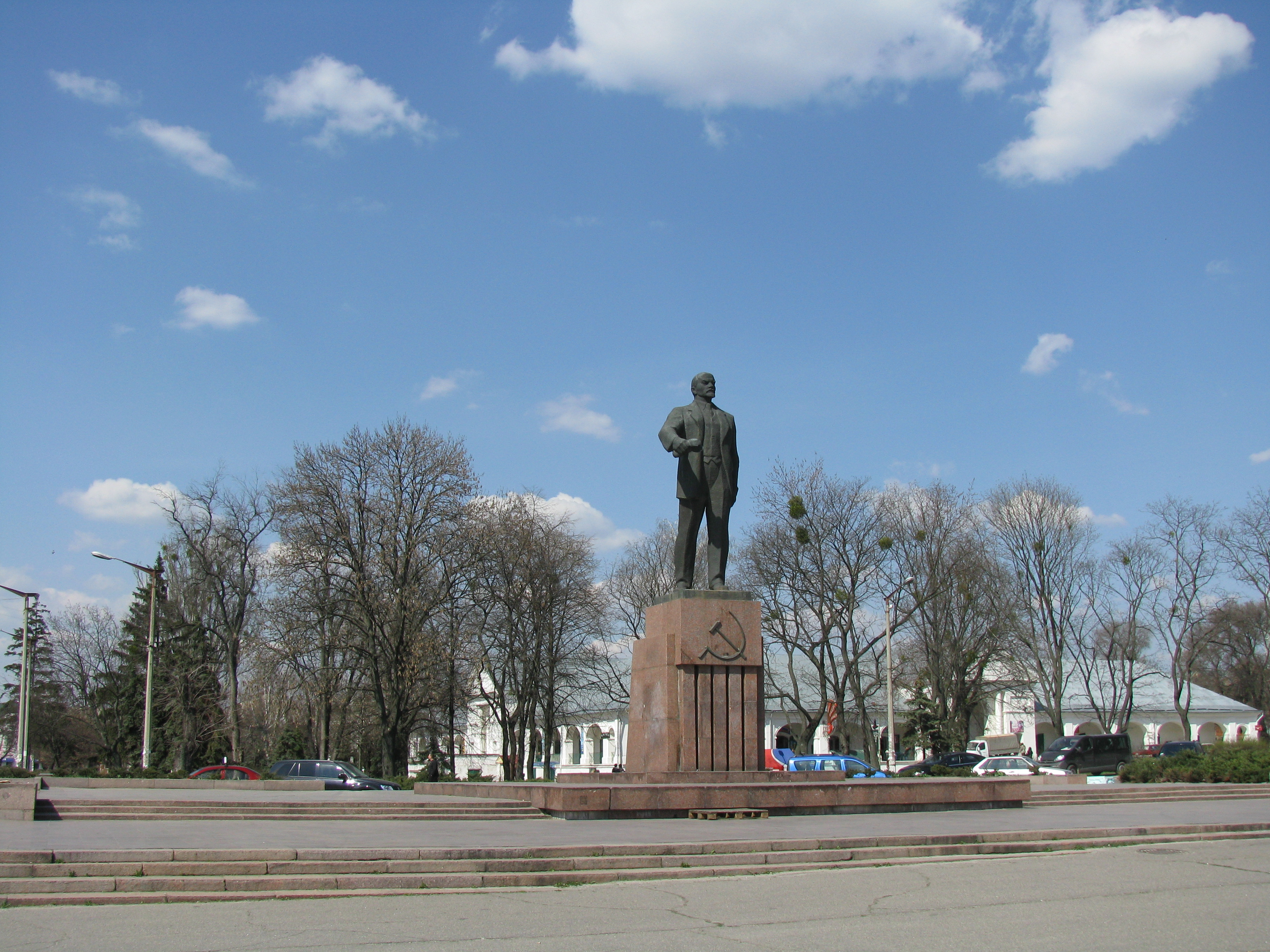
- The statue in 2009
- Interactive map of Statue of Lenin in Bila Tserkva
- Location: Bila Tserkva, Ukraine
- Coordinates: 49.7958°N 30.1162°E
- Dedicated to: Vladimir Lenin
- Dismantled date: 2014
- Because of Ukrainian decommunization laws the statue will not be rebuilt.

The Statue of Lenin in Bila Tserkva (in Ukrainian: Пам'ятник В.І.Леніну) was a sculpture monument to Vladimir Lenin, located in Bila Tserkva, Ukraine. It was built in 1983. The monument ID is 32-103-0093.

It was destroyed and dismantled during the Euromaidan Protests.

== See also ==
- Demolition of monuments to Vladimir Lenin in Ukraine
- List of statues of Vladimir Lenin
