= Statue of Lenin in Berdychiv =

Former monument in Berdychiv, Ukraine

- Пам'ятник Леніну В. І.
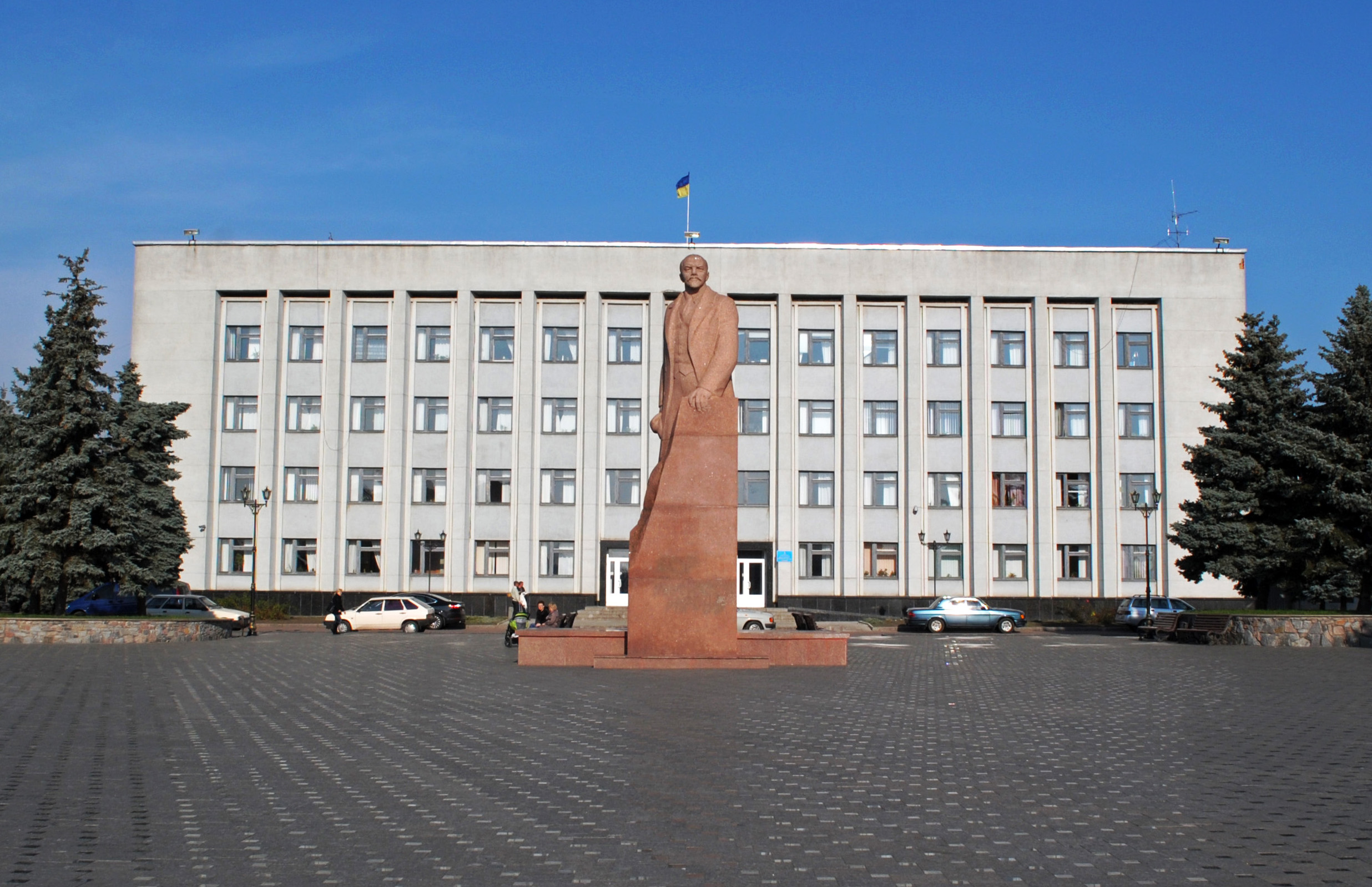
- The statue in 2013
- Interactive map of Statue of Lenin in Berdychiv
- Location: Berdychiv, Ukraine
- Coordinates: 49.8927°N 28.5911°E
- Material: Granite
- Height: 8.7 metres (29 ft)
- Completion date: 1982
- Dedicated to: Vladimir Lenin
- Dismantled date: 2014
- Because of Ukrainian decommunization laws the statue shall not be rebuilt.

The Statue of Lenin in Berdychiv (in Ukrainian: Пам'ятник Леніну В. І.) was a sculpture monument to the revolutionary Vladimir Lenin, located in Berdychiv, Ukraine.

The monument, a work by M. Vasylchenko, P. Biryukov and P. Perevoznyk, was made of granite with a total height of 8.7 metres (29 ft) (sculpture 4.0 m, pedestal 4.7 m). The monument ID is 18-104-0031.

It was toppled and destroyed during the Euromaidan on February 22, 2014.

== See also ==
- Demolition of monuments to Vladimir Lenin in Ukraine
- List of statues of Vladimir Lenin
