= Vladimir Lenin monument, Kyiv =

Destroyed monument to Vladimir Lenin in Kyiv, Ukraine

Coordinates: 50.4425°N 30.5194°E

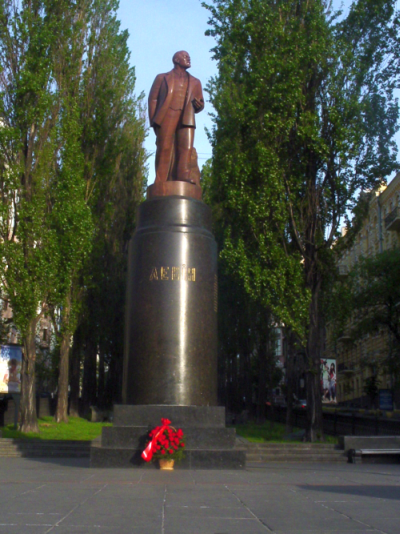
Monument to Lenin in Kyiv pictured in 2007

The Vladimir Lenin monument in Kyiv was a statue dedicated to Vladimir Lenin, the founder of the Soviet Union in Kyiv, the capital of Ukraine. The larger than life-size (3.45 meters [11.32 feet]) Lenin monument was built by Russian sculptor Sergey Merkurov from the same red Karelian stone as Lenin's Mausoleum. It was displayed at the 1939 New York World's Fair and erected on Kyiv's main Khreshchatyk Street (at the intersection of Shevchenko Boulevard, opposite the Bessarabsky Market) on 5 December 1946.

The statue was toppled from its pedestal and crushed by protesters on 8 December 2013, as part of the Euromaidan events, when many other Soviet statues were toppled. The plinth remains in place, and has become at times a site of political artwork, and arguments. Since 2016 various sculptures or installations have been exhibitioned in front of the plinth.

Since 2015 all monuments connected with communism-related themes and/or persons are illegal in Ukraine.

== History ==
=== Soviet era ===
The monument's installation near Bessarabska Square in 1946 was initially planned to be temporary. The monument's placement had been controversial among the public from the very beginning, as its location had been previously used as a place of mass hangings by Nazi and Communist authorities. The statue was also criticized for disrupting the visual axis of Shevchenko Boulevard, and its position facing the market was perceived by many as awkward. Nevertheless, the monument remained in its place for 67 years.

According to the decree of the former president of Ukraine, Viktor Yushchenko, this monument of the Soviet Union and the associated Communist period should have been removed after Ukraine gained independence. Nevertheless, due to the resistance of the Communist Party of Ukraine, whose members were elected to Verkhovna Rada, the last Kyiv monument to Lenin was left standing.

=== Early independence era (1991–2012) ===
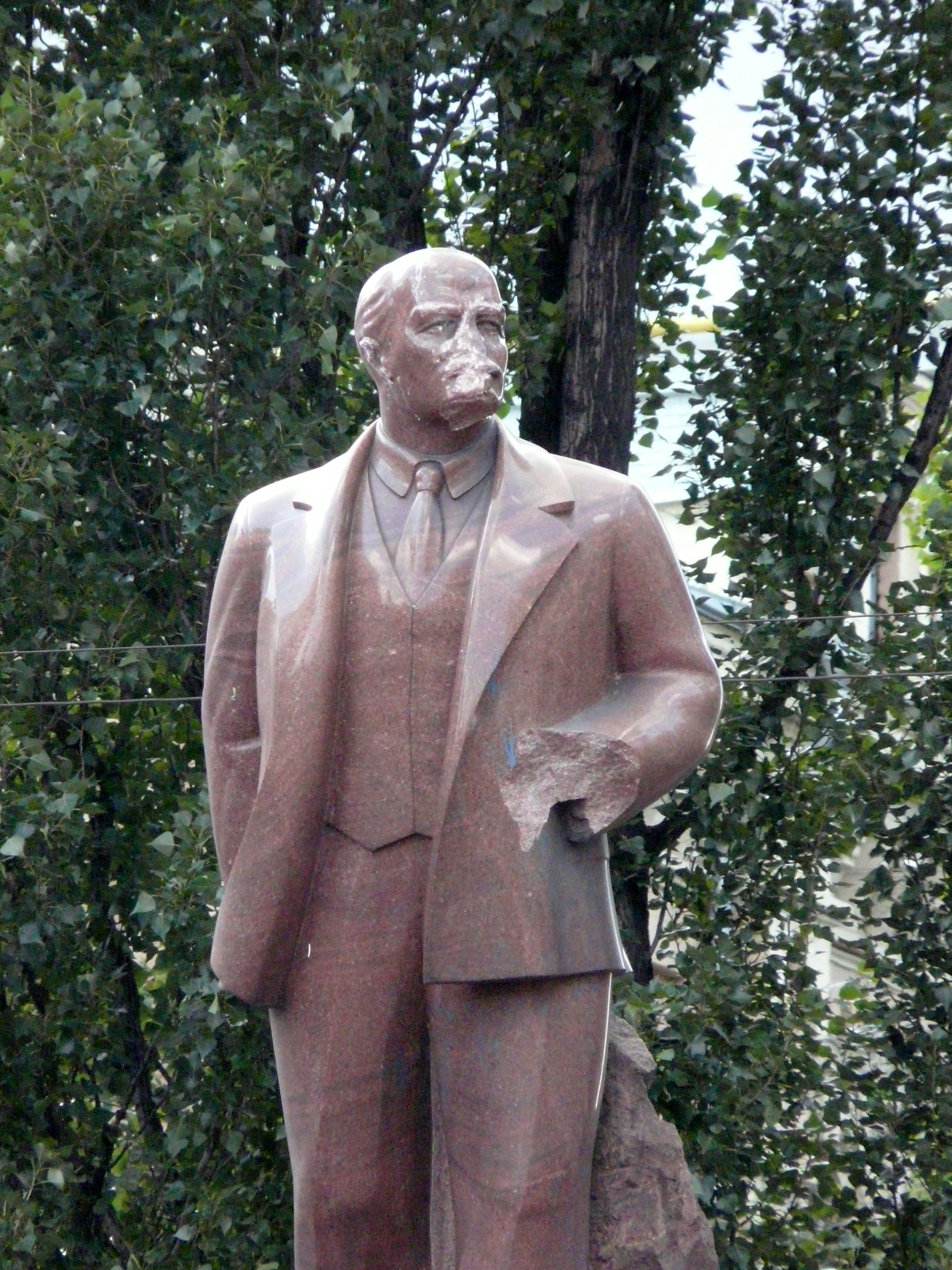
Vandalisation of the Vladimir Lenin monument on Khreshchatyk (30 June 2009).

After the fall of Soviet rule, the monument suffered numerous incidents of vandalism which led to both increased policing of the area and frequent vigilance by pro-Soviet communist activists.

According to Radio Svoboda, about 600 Lenin monuments were dismantled or removed from 2005 to 2008, primarily in the central oblasts of Ukraine, as well as a few western ones. There was no nationwide discussion on the topic of removing totalitarian symbols and toponymy in this period; the subject was usually limited to agitation in right-wing political circles, as well as representatives of the Ukrainian intelligentsia who reasoned it was time to get rid of these Lenin monuments.

When on 30 June 2009, a group of five young nationalist guys including Mykola Kokhanivskyi defaced the Vladimir Lenin monument on Khreshchatyk near the Bessarabska Square in a failed attempt to topple it, this caused widespread outrage; they were arrested and prosecuted, and even condemned by the nationalist organisation they were members of. While president Viktor Yushchenko had also previously asked for the statue to be removed, this proposal did not gain enough support at the time. The vandalised monument was eventually restored, and the decision postponed, marking the end of the second stage of Leninopad.

When the restored Lenin monument was unveiled again on Khreshchatyk on 27 November 2009, the Communist Party of Ukraine held a rally praising Lenin, while nationalists including members of Svoboda held a counter-protest. Two nationalist activists suddenly threw red paint on the monument, after which they were beaten by communist demonstrators, and then arrested by the police; one of them told the press that the monument would be removed sooner or later, and that their act would speed up the process. The Communist Party speaker told the crowd: "Dear comrades, such a scoundrel has no place on our Ukrainian land." The Communist Party of Ukraine then decided to guard the monument around the clock. As hiring a private security agency would have reportedly cost 50 USD per hour, the Party decided to assign eight men from its own Party members to guard the monument in teams of two men per 12-hour day-and-night shift. The Party paid them enough to buy lunch, but the guards said they were motivated by ideology rather than money, with one telling the Kyiv Post in June 2010: "Now everybody defames Lenin for his totalitarian rule and for destroying the Ukrainian nation. But there is nothing wrong with totalitarian rule, I think."

== Demolition ==
On 24 November 2013, the fourth day of the Euromaidan protests, at least 30 police officers reportedly guarded the Lenin monument by order of the city authorities, as it was state property, and protesters had earlier thrown eggs at it; Euromaidan protesters shouted "Shame on you!" (Ukrainian: Ганьба!, romanized: Hanba!) as they walked by. The Communisty Party had set up a tent with its own guards, but that tent was smashed by some activists that day.

Video of the monument being toppled

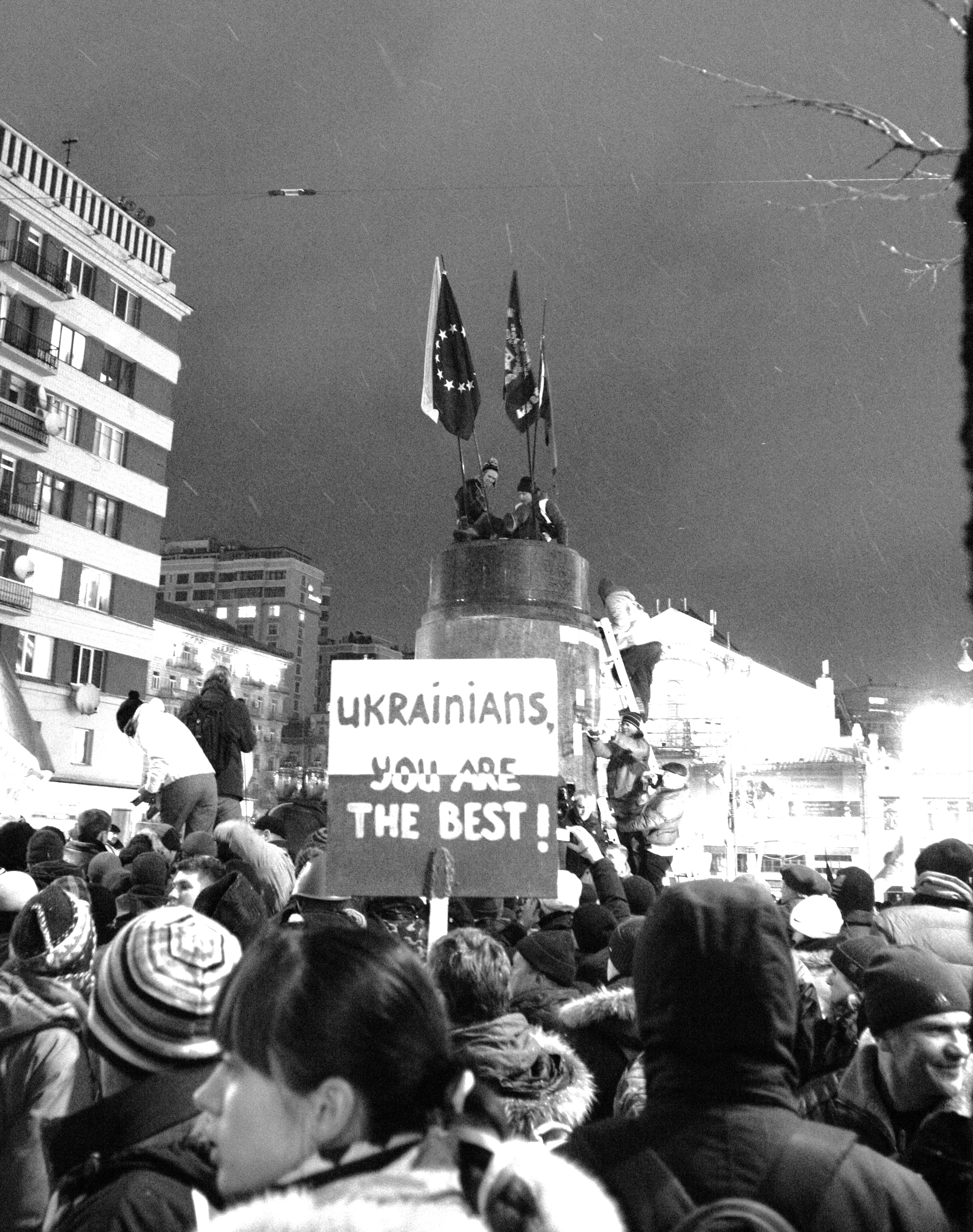
Demonstrators on the plinth of the statue after it was toppled

On 1 December 2013, at 8:45 p.m. a group of masked men attempted to topple the statue during the surge of the Euromaidan protests. Police immediately reacted by deploying a small Berkut riot police unit which was attacked, overwhelmed and forced to flee. The men threw a rope around the statue and tried to pull it down, but then the Berkut returned and drove them away. Euromaidan leaders immediately denounced both the monument attempt and the clash with police as an action of unaffiliated "provocateurs".

On 8 December 2013, around 11:45 a.m., the Kyiv Post reported only four police officers guarding the Lenin monument, along with a "light police" presence on Khreshchatyk. Around 6 p.m., several Ukrainian individuals subsequently claimed to be affiliated with the Svoboda political party toppled the statue with a steel wire rope, as Kyiv police silently looked on. The statue then broke from impact with the ground.

After the fall of the Lenin statue the crowd began to sing the national anthem of Ukraine. Later, pieces of the monument were picked up by protesters as souvenirs.

Over a hundred other Lenin statues and Soviet icons across Ukraine were destroyed from December 2013 to February 2014.

=== Response ===
==== Movement ====
The removal or destruction of Lenin monuments and statues gained particular momentum after the destruction of the Kyiv Lenin statue. Under the motto "Ленінопад" (Leninopad, translated into English as "Leninfall"), activists pulled down a dozen communist monuments in the Kyiv region, Zhytomyr, Khmelnytskyi, and elsewhere, or damaged them during the course of the EuroMaidan protests into spring of 2014. In other cities and towns, monuments were removed by organised heavy equipment and transported to scrapyards or dumps.

==== Political response ====
The reactions both inside and outside Ukraine were mixed, with some politicians condemning it, others supporting it. The toppling of this and later statues was celebrated by some as a symbolic act of revenge against dictatorial misrule, or acts of Ukraine's pro-European liberation from Russia, by others judged to be acts of vandalism, nationalism, or (by Ukrainian communists) downplayed as "isolated acts of hooliganism" that will be repaired eventually.

In Parliament, Deputy Ihor Miroshnychenko claimed responsibility for it on behalf of Svoboda, explaining: "I have been to many cities in Ukraine. And in each of them I was asked to take this "fool" away from Kyiv." Batkivshchyna Deputy Andriy Shevchenko said the Euromaidan headquarters did not initiate the toppling; however, the statue should have been removed a long time ago, because it had been "a point of tension" in the city. He added: "We look at the demolition of Lenin as the beginning of farewell to Sovietism. And let's not forget about the main demands: we are not at war with monuments, but with Yanukovych." UDAR deputy Valeriy Karpuntsov announced that Ukrainian police had started arrests of people present in the area during the fall of the last monument to Lenin in Kyiv, even if they had nothing to do with the toppling.

Spokesperson for former President Viktor Yushchenko and Chair of the Political Council of Our Ukraine Iryna Vannikova pointed out that the toppled monument fell outside the scope of Ukrainian legislation. She recalled that, in accordance with Decree No. 432/2009 ‘On Additional Measures to Honour the Memory of the Victims of the 1932–1933 Holodomor in Ukraine’, local state administrations and the Council of Ministers of the Autonomous Republic of Crimea were instructed to take additional measures, in accordance with established procedures, to dismantle monuments and memorials dedicated to individuals involved in organising and carrying out the famines and political repressions in Ukraine. Lastly, she rejected the accusation of vandalism or that the toppling had been a punishable offence, saying: "Totalitarian symbols and place names should have been removed long ago, and the fact that this has not been done to the full extent merely highlights the local authorities' inertia in implementing presidential decrees and their indifference to, or ignorance of, national history."

The Prime Minister of Ukraine, Mykola Azarov (Party of Regions), Petro Symonenko (Communist Party of Ukraine), and the Communist Party of the Russian Federation condemned the toppling of the last monument to Lenin in Kyiv. Azarov's spokesperson went as far as to claim that, after the Buddhas of Bamiyan (destroyed in 2001), this was the second time ever in modern history that an UNESCO World Heritage site had been destroyed. However, UNESCO press secretary Roni Amelan was quick to respond the next day that the Lenin statue in Kyiv wasn't actually on the World Heritage list, clarifying exactly which seven sites in Ukraine had UNESCO status at the time.

The governor of Kharkiv Oblast, Mykhailo Dobkin (Party of Regions), tweeted on 8 December 2013 about starting a crowdfunding campaign to restore the monument: "Tomorrow I will open the account for restoration of the monument to Lenin in Kyiv… Everybody, who hates Hutsuls for their stupidity, join". He stated that he would allocate the sum of ₴100,000 for the restoration of the monument.

==== Public opinion ====
According to a Research & Branding Group poll conducted amongst Kyivans in the immediate aftermath from 10 to 14 of December 2013, a slight majority of residents of Kyiv (69%) had a negative attitude to the removal of Lenin's monument during the mass protest actions, while 13% had a positive attitude and 15% remained indifferent.

According to a Harvard University conducted in March 2015, support for demolition of Lenin monuments had jumped to 53% in the City of Kyiv, and to 43% Kyiv Oblast, while support for keeping Lenin monuments in Kyiv Oblast dropped from 23% in March 2013 to 16% in March 2015.

==== Notable figures ====
- Singer Ruslana (one of the leading figures of the protests) was critical of the event, saying, "We do not need any barbaric actions. We condemn acts of vandalism, savagery, violence and anything that can divide and split Ukraine [...] doubling monuments and calls for aggression is nothing but a movement in the opposite direction of European integration and humane society."
- Singer-songwriter Maria Burmaka (participant in the 1989–1991 Ukrainian revolution) celebrated the event: "I don't care whether it's a provocation or not. This bloodthirsty tyrant has long since had no place here. Lenin is kaput!!!"
- Leading sociologist Volodymyr Paniotto of the Kyiv International Institute of Sociology said about Lenin statue topplings: "On one hand, it's a symbol of separating from the totalitarian past. But on the other, it's a characteristic of a radicalized society using uncivilized methods instead of civilized ones."
- Composer Valentyn Silvestrov commented on the demolition of the monument as follows:

"The monument has been torn down — a dubious achievement of the revolution, but an achievement nonetheless. The authorities managed to dismantle the Lenin monument on Maidan; they could just as easily have removed this one. And placed it in a museum, as it may well have some sculptural value. Who was it erected for, the Communists? After all, there isn't a single monument to Stalin in Kyiv. So why was the one to Lenin left standing – what makes him any better? He promised the peasants land and factories, but it all turned into nothing but mass murder. And we're supposed to erect a monument to this man?"

- Euromaidan activist Volodymyr Viatrovych (since 2019 Deputy for European Solidarity) remarked:

"Monuments from the era of totalitarianism are rarely removed through legal channels. For the most part, this happens spontaneously, during times of revolution. This was the case in the 1989–1990s in Eastern Europe and in Western Ukraine. Therefore, we should not dramatise the toppling of the Lenin statue in Kyiv. I think most people would agree that there is no place for such monuments in the capital of a European state."

== Later use of the site ==
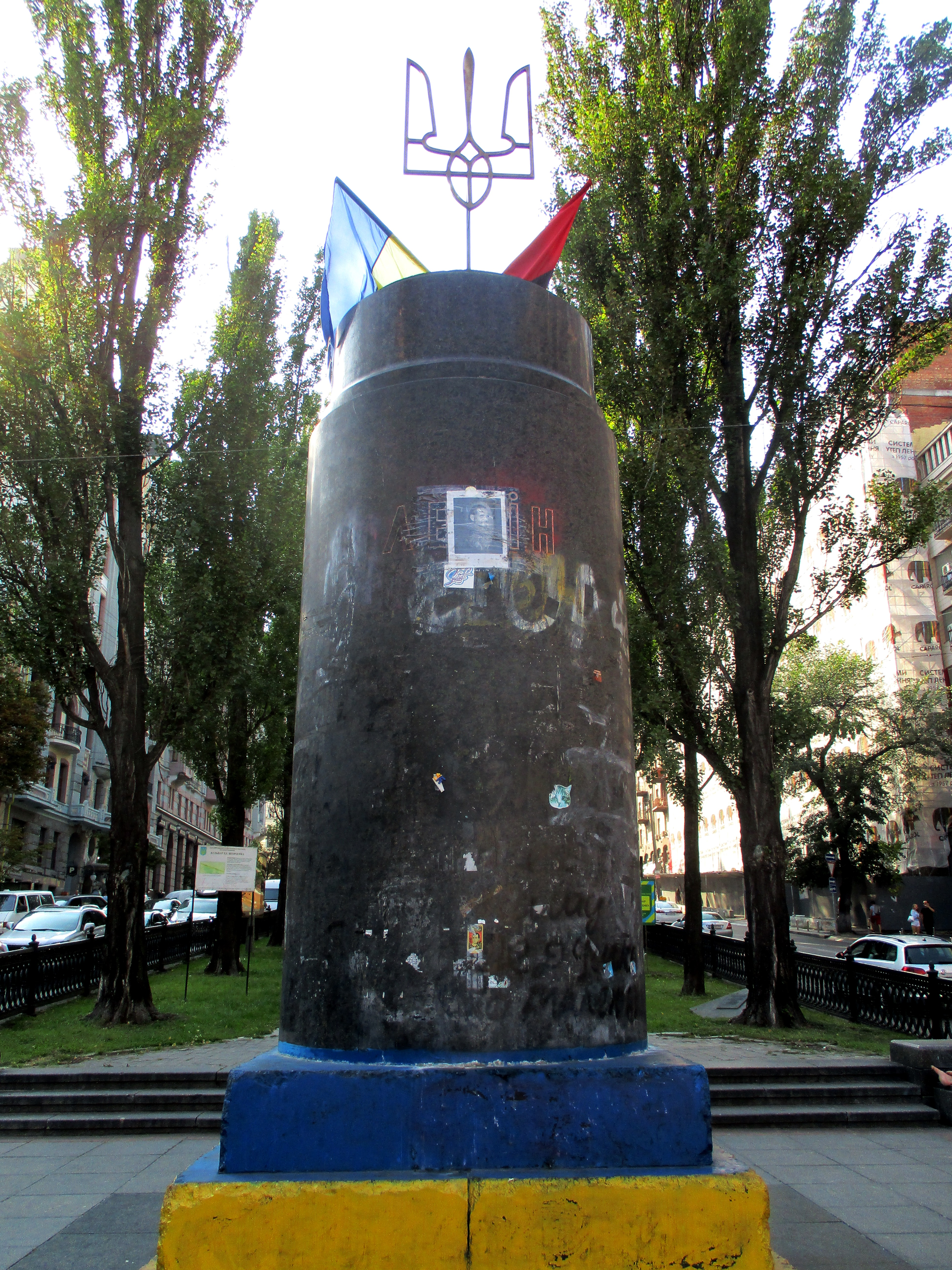
Coat of Arms of Ukraine in place of the demolished Lenin monument (pictured August 2019)

In early February 2014, as a joke, a golden toilet pot was put on the empty pedestal of the Lenin monument, which disappeared a few days later around 9 February. On 13 February, a group of about 100 golden mannequins was placed in front of the pedestal, which its 26-year-old conceptualist artist Tetyana Voitovych from Ivano-Frankivsk explained as a new generation taking control over their country and their future, an idea which received mixed responses.

On 15 May 2015, President of Ukraine Petro Poroshenko signed a bill into law that started a six-month period for the removal of all communist themed monuments in Ukraine.

Although the statue has been removed, the monument's plinth has remained in place. This plinth has become at times a site of political artwork, and arguments. Since 2016 various sculptures or installations have been exhibitioned in front of the plinth, including a gold-painted toilet inspired by Viktor Yanukovych's Mezhyhirya Residence, and a giant blue human hand created by Romanian artist Bogdan Rață. Starting from 2022, Kyiv city authorities have been proposing to install a fountain on the site of the demolished monument.

== Gallery ==
Pictures of the aftermath of the monument's toppling in December 2013
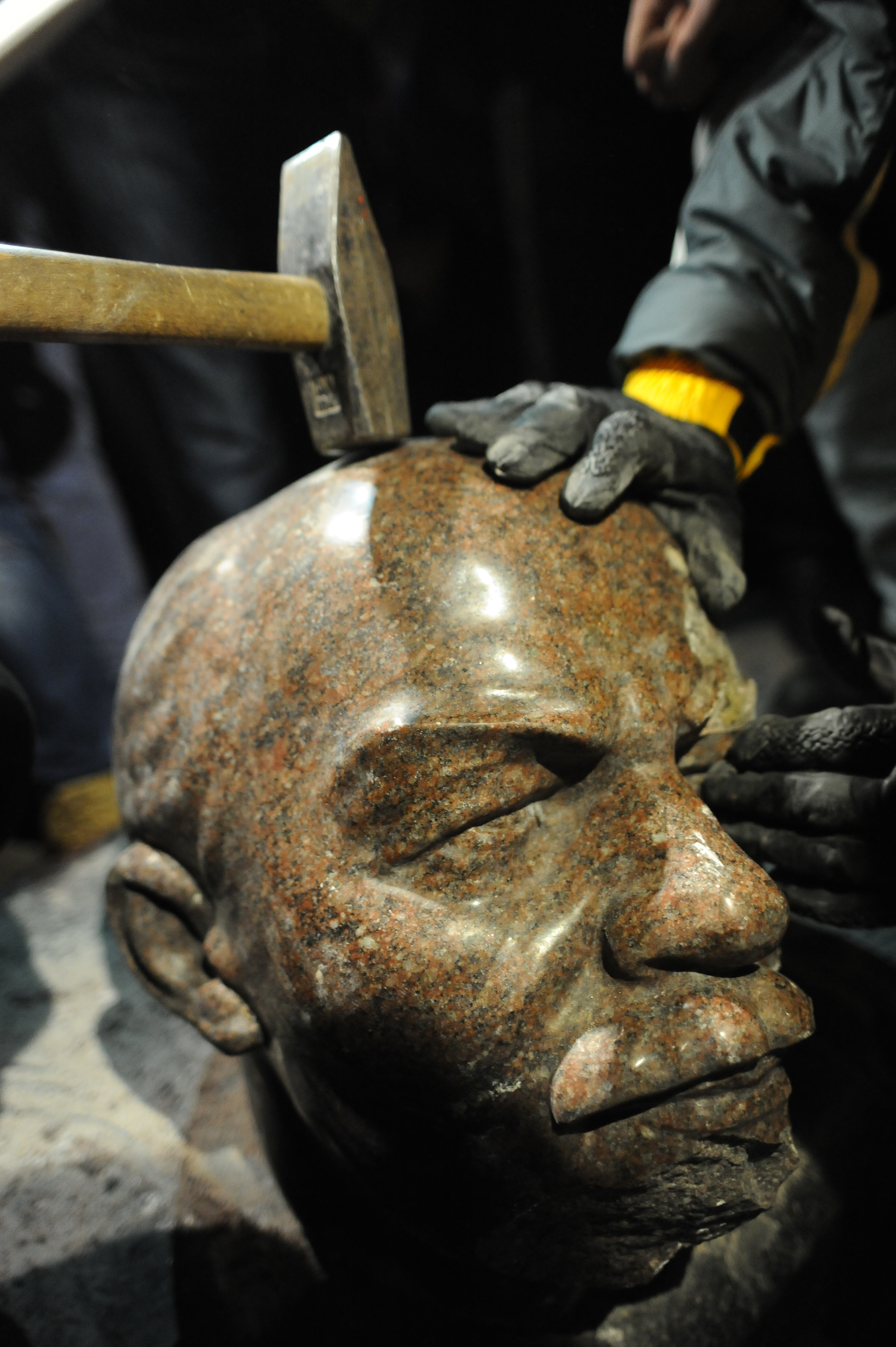

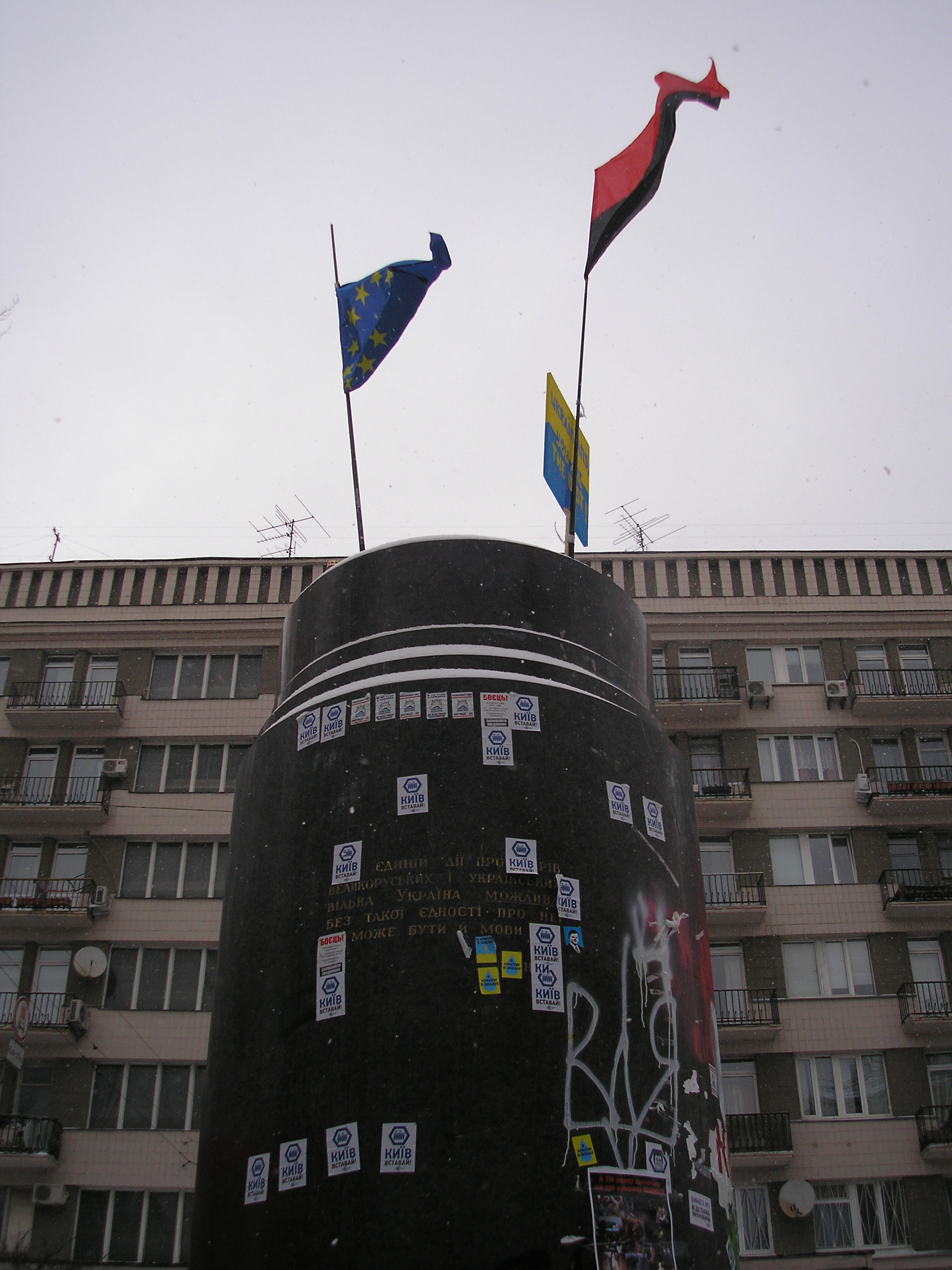

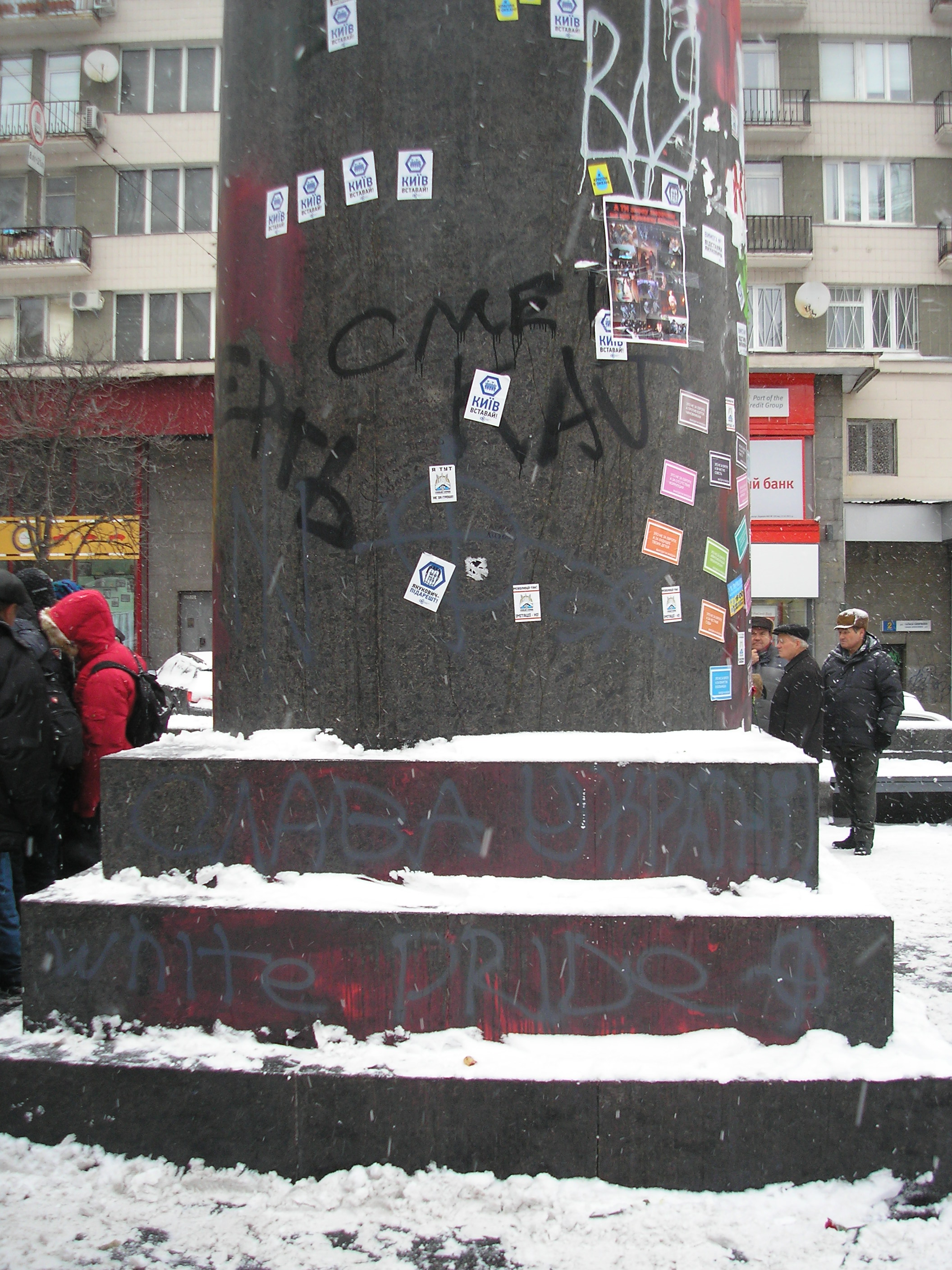

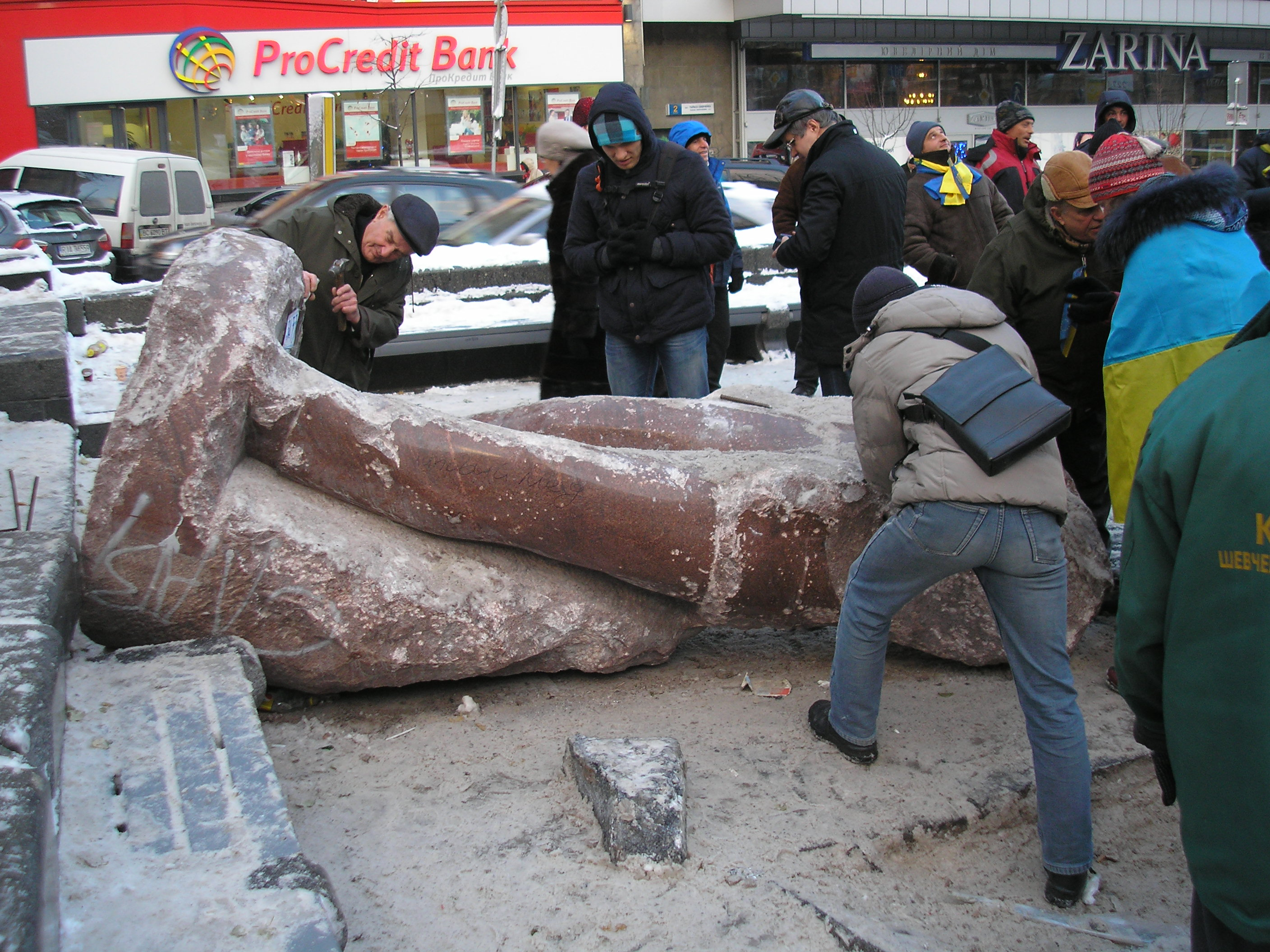

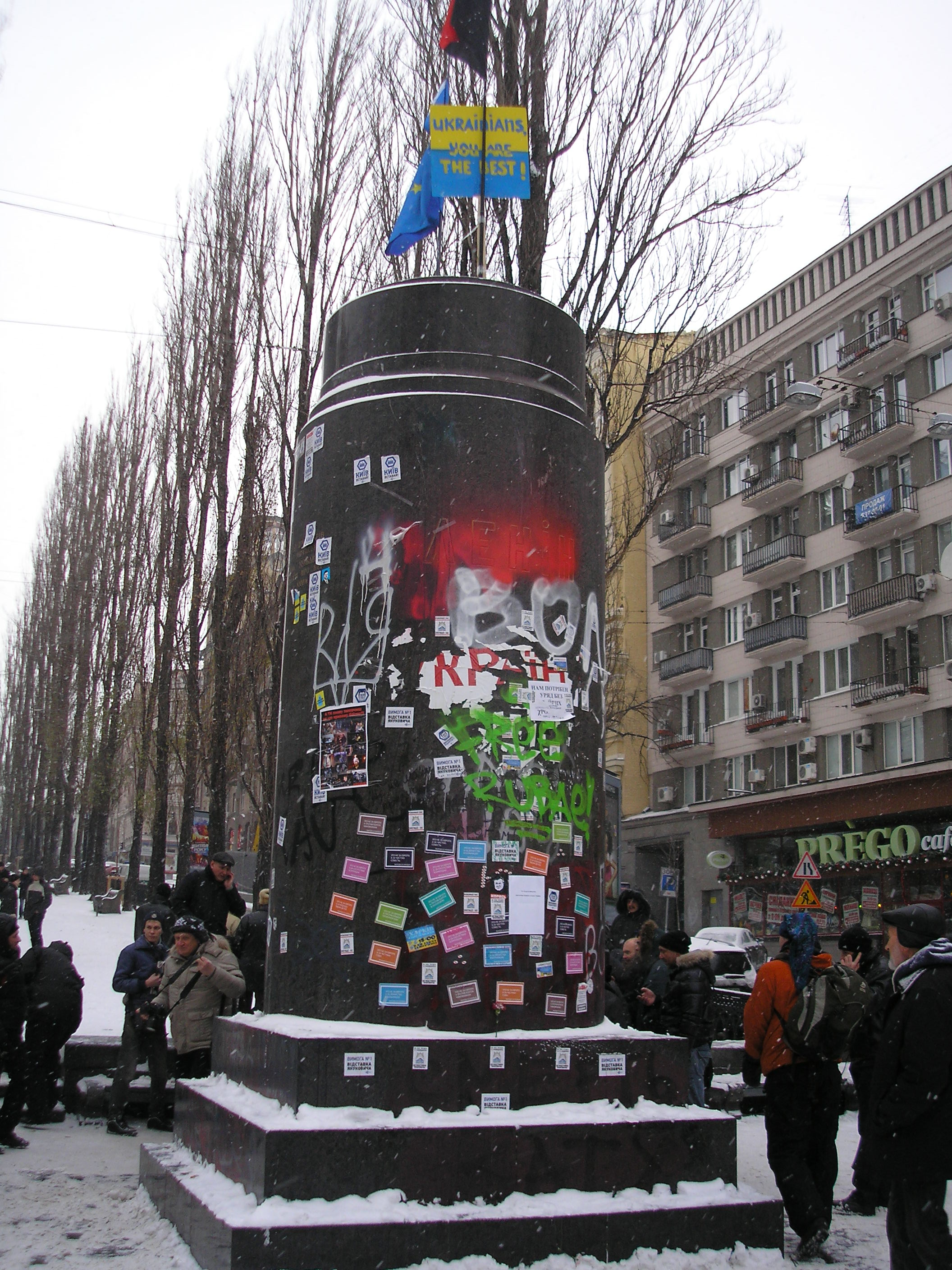

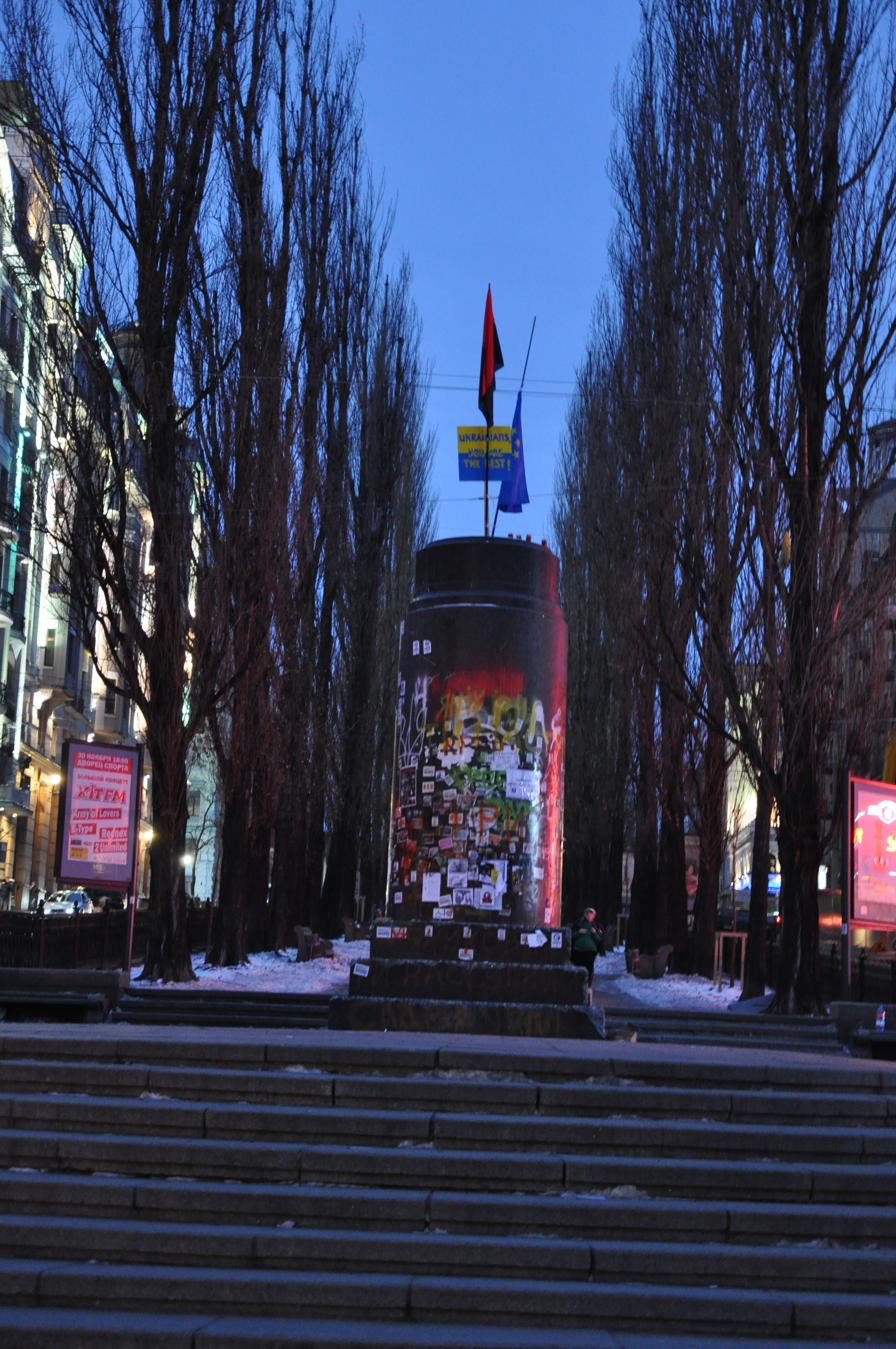

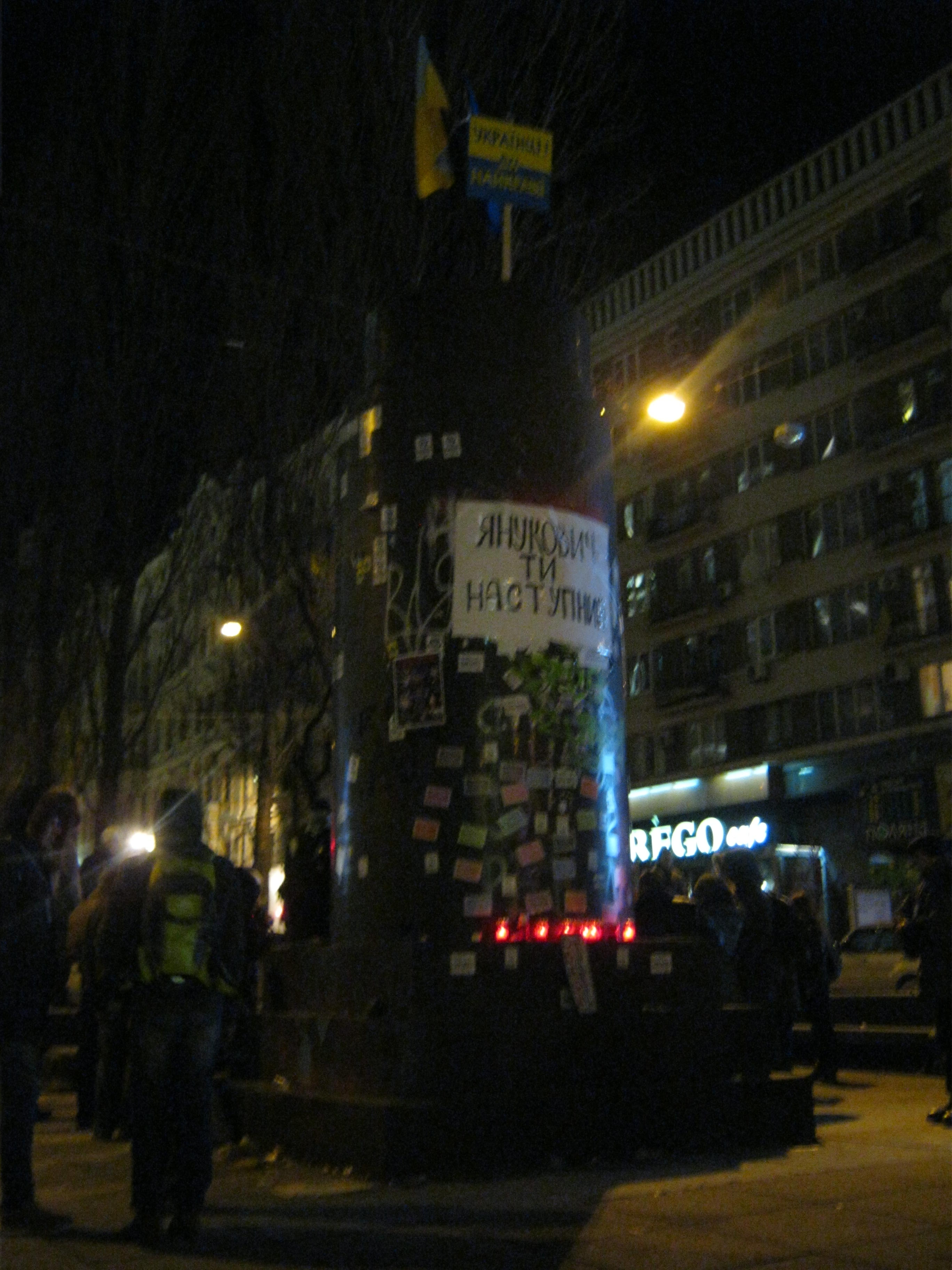

== See also ==
- Demolition of monuments to Vladimir Lenin in Ukraine
- List of communist monuments damaged during Euromaidan
- List of communist monuments in Ukraine
- List of statues of Vladimir Lenin
- Soviet imagery during the Russo-Ukrainian War
- Monument of the Great October Revolution
- Decommunization in Ukraine
