= Demolition of monuments to Vladimir Lenin in Ukraine =

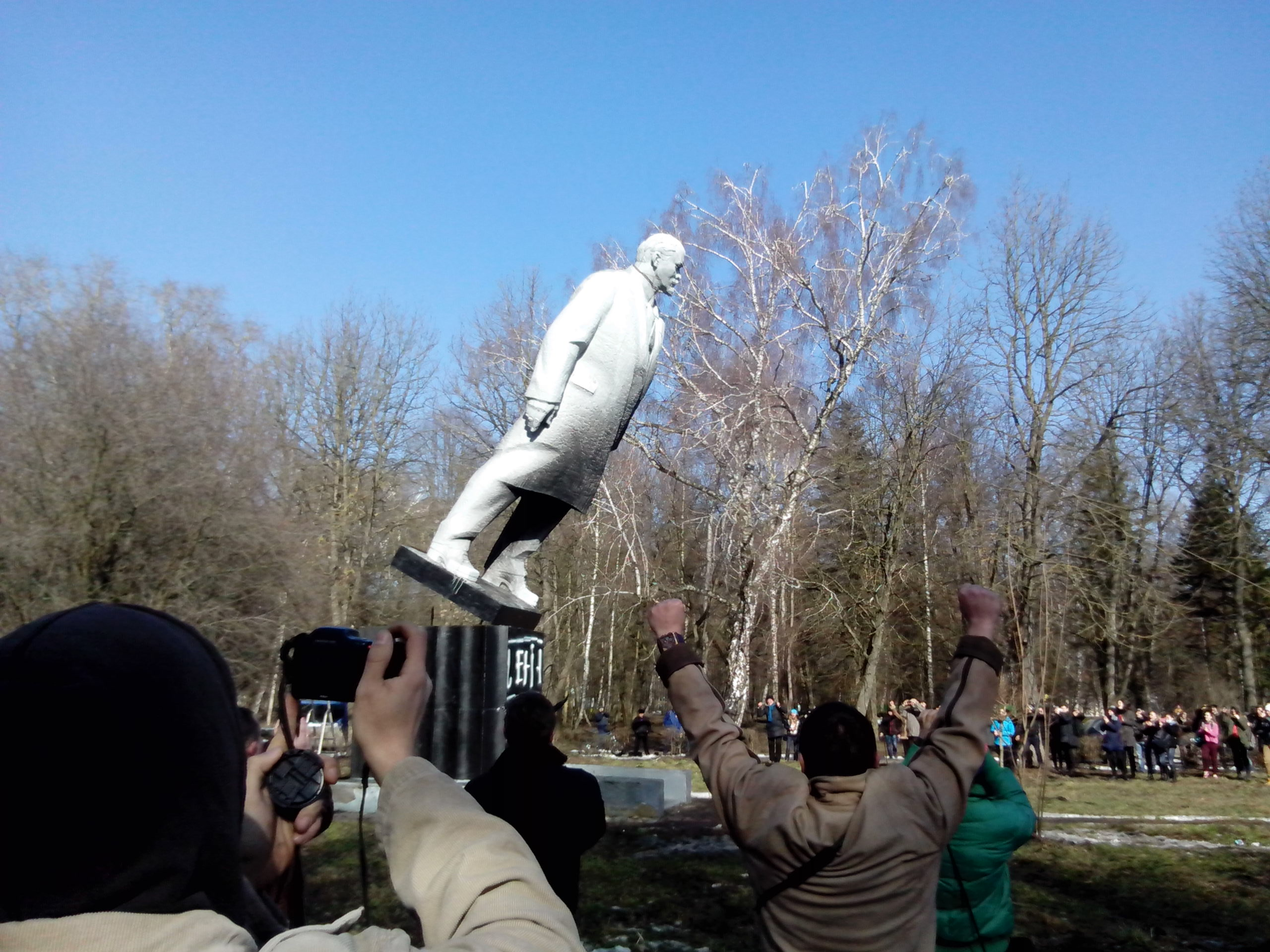
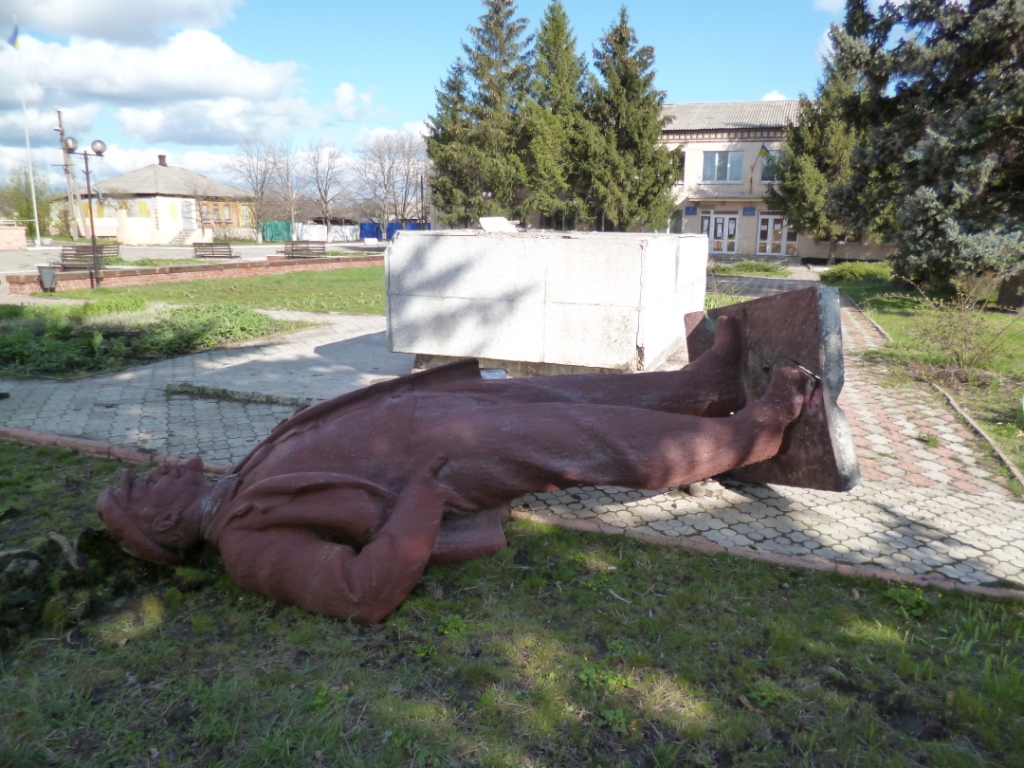
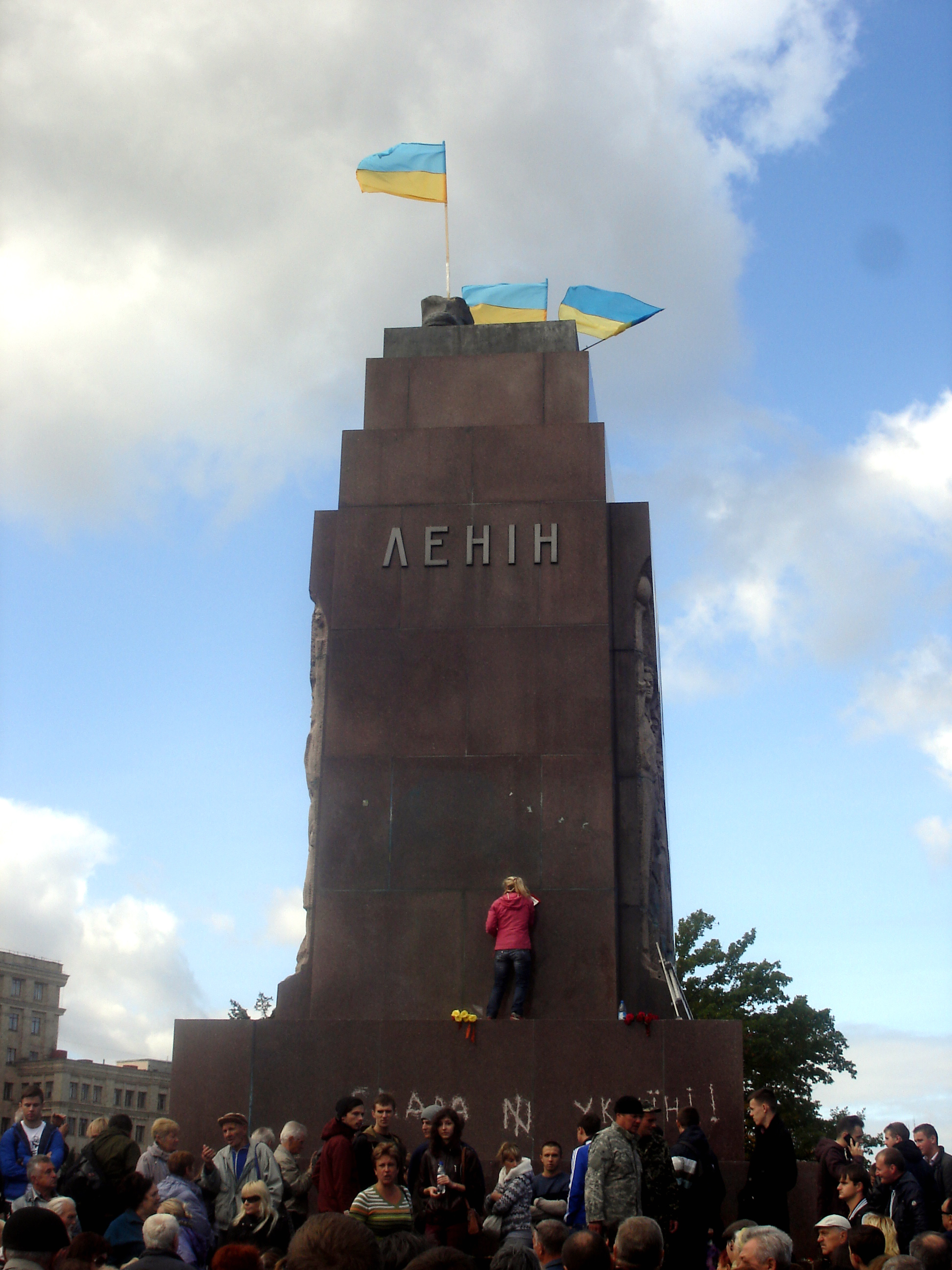
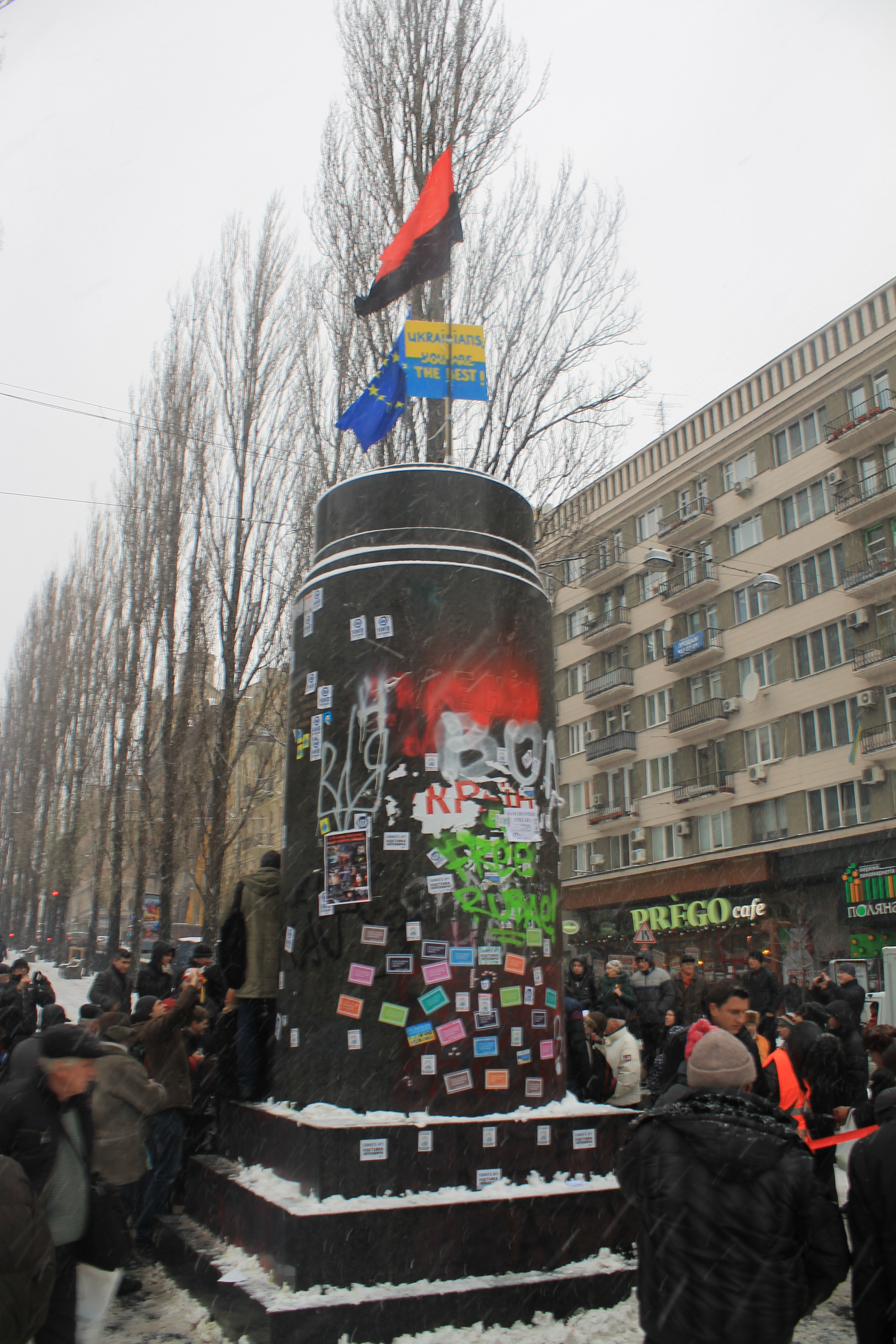
Clockwise from top left:
- A falling Lenin monument in Khmelnytskyi
- Statue of Lenin toppled near Stanytsia Luhanska
- The Lenin monument in Kyiv on 9 December 2013
- The statue of Lenin in Kharkiv on 29 September 2014

The demolition of monuments to Vladimir Lenin in Ukraine began during the collapse of the Soviet Union and continued on a smaller scale throughout the 1990s, primarily in some western towns of Ukraine. However, by 2013, most Lenin statues across Ukraine were still intact. During the 2013–2014 Euromaidan protests, the destruction of statues became widespread, a phenomenon that came to be popularly known as Leninopad (Note: Ukrainian: Ленінопад. Russian: Ленинопад. Compare листопад, lystopad, "leaf fall", the Ukrainian word for "November", though some cognates in related Slavic languages use it for "October" instead.) (or Leninfall in English.) The use of "-пад" being akin to English words suffixed with "fall" as in "waterfall" and "snowfall".

== History ==
=== Overview ===
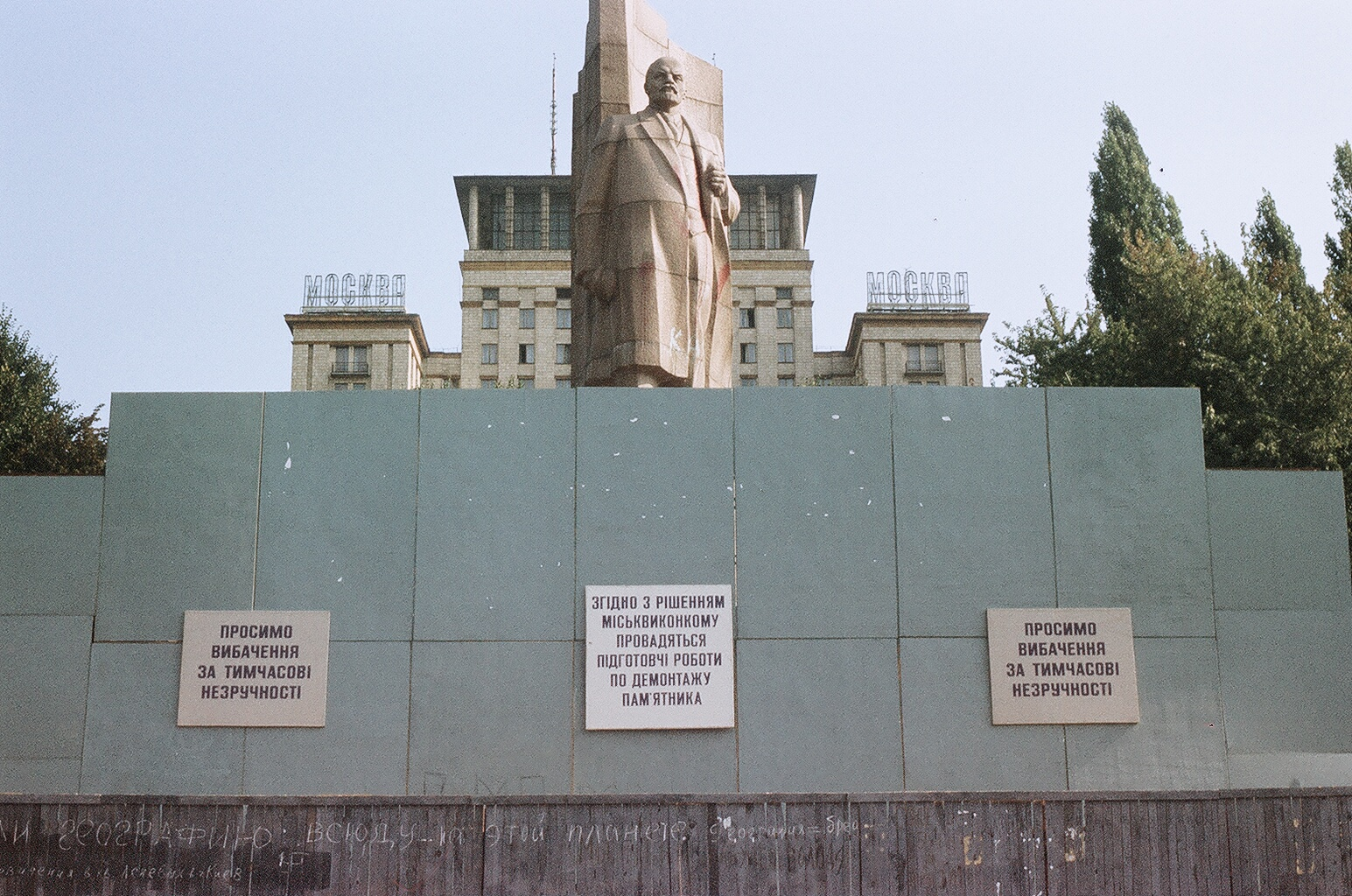
The Monument of the Great October Revolution was dismantled in September 1991, shortly after Ukraine's Declaration of Independence (24 August 1991). The signs say: "In accordance with the decision of the City Executive Committee, preparatory work is underway for the dismantling of the monument," and: "We apologise for any temporary inconvenience caused."

In 1991, Ukraine had 5,500 Lenin monuments. More than 700 Lenin monuments were removed and/or destroyed between February 2014 and December 2015. In November 2015, approximately 1,300 Lenin monuments were still standing.

According to a December 2024 report by Radio Svoboda, the demolition of Lenin monuments in Ukraine had so far happened in three stages:

1. During the 1990s, more than 2,000 Lenin monuments were demolished in western Ukraine, mostly in Volhynia and Galicia west of the river Zbruch;
2. in 2005–2008, more than 600 were demolished mainly in central oblasts, and some western oblasts; and
3. in 2013–2014, during Euromaidan and the Revolution of Dignity, 552 monuments were demolished.

=== 1990s ===
The first wave of demolitions of Lenin monuments happened in Western Ukraine in 1990–1991. On 1 August 1990 in Chervonohrad (renamed Sheptytskyi in 2024), a Lenin monument was demolished for the first time in the USSR. Under popular pressure the monument was dismantled, formally with the purpose of moving elsewhere. That same year, Lenin monuments were dismantled in Ternopil, Kolomyia, Nadvirna, Boryslav, Drohobych, Lviv and other cities of Galicia.

=== 2005–2008 ===
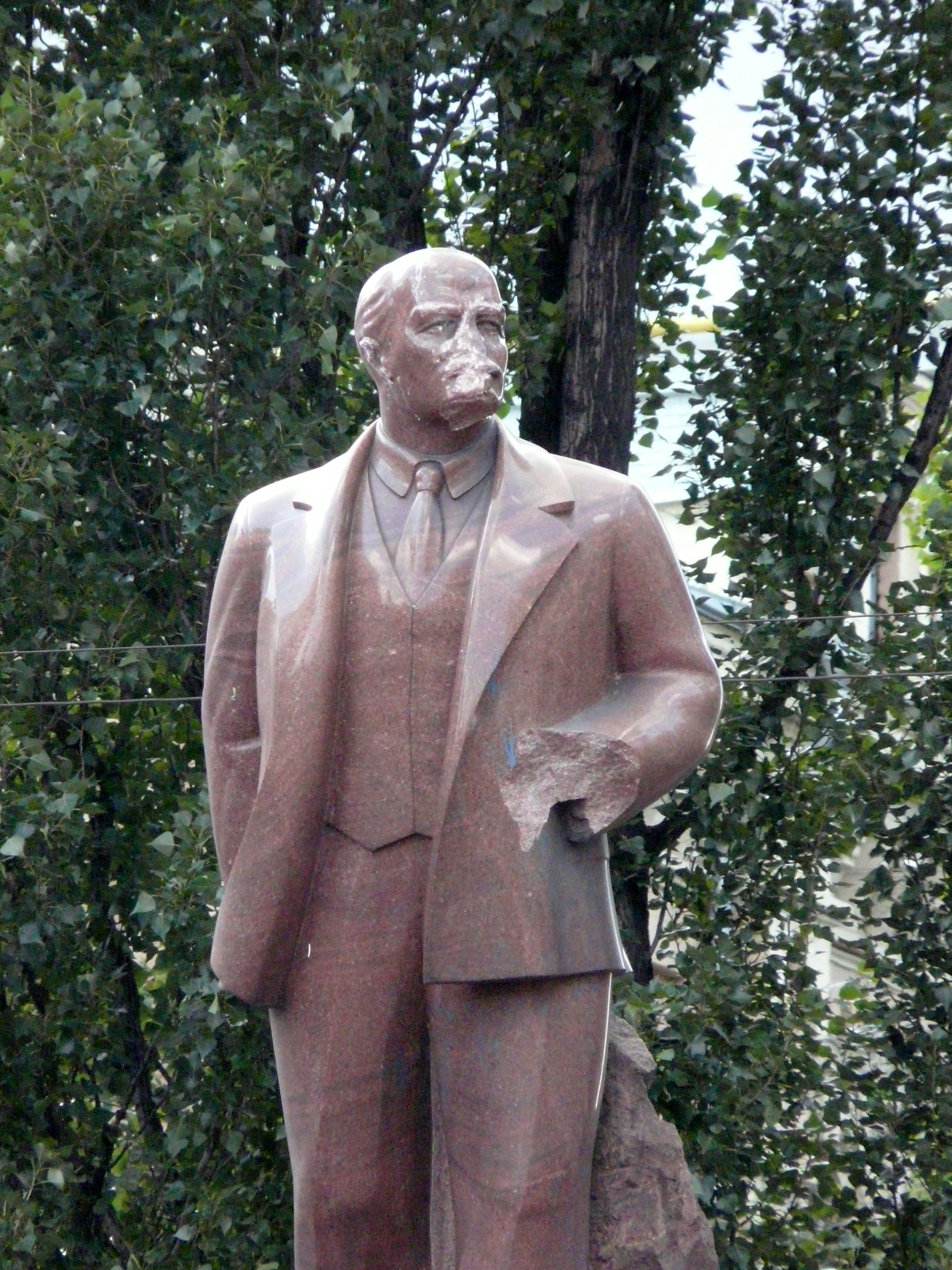
Vandalisation of the Vladimir Lenin monument on Khreshchatyk (30 June 2009).

According to Radio Svoboda, about 600 Lenin monuments were dismantled or removed from 2005 to 2008, primarily in the central oblasts of Ukraine, as well as a few western ones. Unlike the wild wave of the early 1990s in Western Ukraine that was accompanied by waving national flags and shouting "Glory to Ukraine!", this was usually a rather formal and administrative process. It was marked by signs such as "taken away for repairs", "fallen apart due to age", "removed due to a state of emergency", and so on. There was no nationwide discussion on the topic of removing totalitarian symbols and toponymy in this period; the subject was usually limited to agitation in right-wing political circles, as well as representatives of the Ukrainian intelligentsia who reasoned it was time to get rid of these Lenin monuments.

When on 30 June 2009, a group of five young nationalist guys including Mykola Kokhanivskyi defaced the Vladimir Lenin monument on Khreshchatyk near the Bessarabska Square in a failed attempt to topple it, this caused widespread outrage; they were arrested and prosecuted, and even condemned by the nationalist organisation they were members of. While president Viktor Yushchenko had also previously asked for the statue to be removed, this proposal did not gain enough support at the time. The vandalised monument was eventually restored, and the decision postponed, marking the end of the second stage of Leninopad.

=== Communist monuments toppled during Euromaidan (2013–2014) ===
Video of the Kyiv Lenin monument being toppled on 8 December 2013

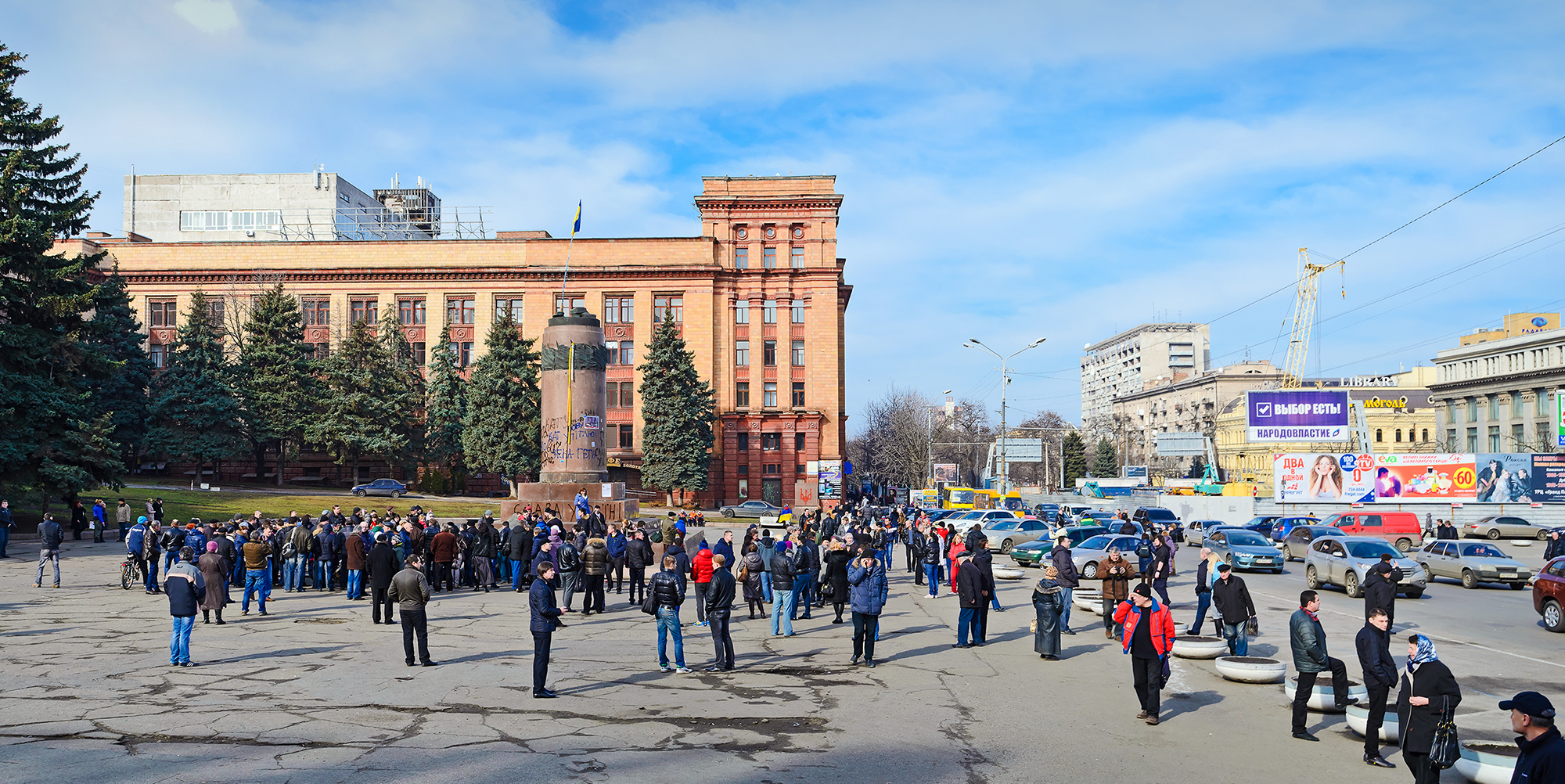
Lenin Square in Dnipro on 22 February 2014 with the demolished monuments to Vladimir Lenin.

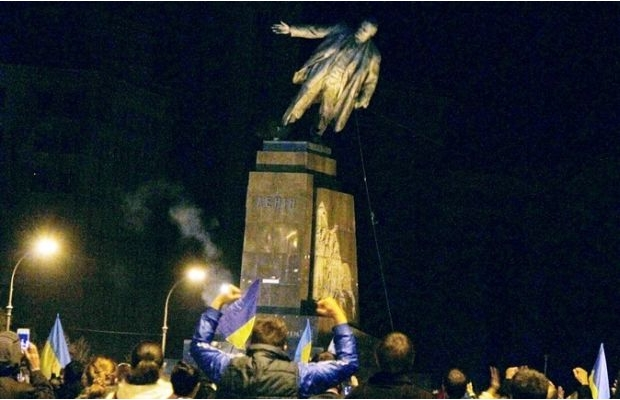
Toppling of the Statue of Lenin in Kharkiv on 28 September 2014

Starting on 8 December 2013, Euromaidan protesters toppled several statues of Vladimir Lenin in Ukrainian cities. The first Lenin to fall was the Khreshchatyk monument near Bessarabska Square in Kyiv, the same one that was vandalised but restored in 2009. Some estimates said that more than a hundred statues were toppled. In December 2015, The Ukrainian Week calculated that 376 Lenin monuments were removed or destroyed in February 2014 alone, when the Revolution of Dignity occurred. Radio Svoboda stated that between December 2013 and December 2014, "552 monuments to Lenin and several dozen more monuments to other Bolshevik leaders have been dismantled in Ukraine."

This is a partial list:

Landmark	Location	Date	Status	Notes	Image
Statue of Lenin	Andriievo-Ivanove	3 January 2014	Broken in two	Police launched an investigation based on a Criminal Code article entitled "Destruction of, or Damage to, Monuments of History or Culture".	
Statue of Lenin	Berdychiv	22 February 2014	Toppled and destroyed		Statue of Lenin in Berdychiv in 2013.
Statue of Lenin	Bila Tserkva	2014	Toppled and destroyed		Statue of Lenin in Bila Tserkva in 2009.
Statue of Lenin	Chernihiv	21 February 2014	Toppled		"Lenin has laid down"
Statue of Lenin	Chervona Sloboda	8 July 2014	Toppled	According to the Ukrainian Communist Party "a criminal case has been opened over the act of vandalism".	
Statue of Lenin	Kharkiv	28 September 2014	Toppled and destroyed		The destruction of the Kharkiv Lenin statue on 28 September 2014
Statue of Lenin	Kherson	7 February 2013	Destroyed		
Statue of Lenin	Khmelnytskyi	21 February 2014	Toppled		Toppling of the statue of Lenin in Khmelnitsky, 21 February 2014.
Statue of Lenin	Korosten	5 October 2014	Toppled		Empty plinth
Statue of Lenin	Kyiv	8 December 2013	Toppled and destroyed		Toppled Lenin statue being broken into pieces for souvenirs
Statue of Lenin	Melitopol	5 July 2015	Dismantled by the City Council		An empty pedestal of a Lenin statue
Statue of Lenin	Novomoskovsk	2 August 2015	Toppled		
Statue of Lenin	"Pressmash" Factory, Odesa	23 October 2015	Transformed into a statue of Darth Vader		
Statue of Lenin	Podilsk	8 December 2013	Broken into several pieces		
Statue of Lenin	Pryluky		Dismantled		
Bust of Lenin	Sievierodonetsk	1 October 2014	Set on fire and dismantled		
Statue of Lenin	Stanytsia Luhanska	16 April 2015	Toppled		
Statue of Lenin	Velyki Sorochyntsi		Dismantled		
Statue of Lenin	Zaporizhzhia	17 March 2016	Dismantled		
Statue of Lenin	Zhytomyr	21 February 2014	Toppled and destroyed		

=== Post-Euromaidan ===
On 9 April 2015, the Ukrainian parliament passed legislation on decommunization. On 15 May 2015, President of Ukraine Petro Poroshenko signed this bill into law that started a six-month period for the removal of communist monuments (excluding World War II monuments) and the mandatory renaming of settlements with names related to Communism. On 16 January 2017, the Ukrainian Institute of National Remembrance announced that 1,320 Lenin monuments were dismantled during decommunization.

A website "Raining Lenins" tracks the statistics of the fall of Lenin statues in Ukraine.

On 17 March 2016, the largest Lenin monument at the unoccupied territory of Ukraine, 19.8 meters high, was dismantled in Zaporizhzhia. In between the annexation of the Crimean Peninsula by the Russian Federation and 28 September 2014, the largest Lenin monument at the unoccupied territory was standing in Kharkiv (20.2 m high). This statue of Lenin in Kharkiv was toppled and destroyed on 28 September 2014.

In February 2019, The Guardian reported that the two Lenin statues in the Chernobyl Exclusion Zone were the only two remaining statues of Lenin in Ukraine, if not taking into account occupied territories of Ukraine. In January 2021 "Radio Free Europe/Radio Liberty" located three more remaining Lenin statues in three (Ukrainian controlled) small villages. This increased the number of remaining Lenin statues to five.

During the Russian invasion of Ukraine, many of these statues of Lenin, which had been taken down by Ukrainian activists, were re-erected by Russian occupiers in Russian-controlled areas.

=== Map ===
Map showing the removal, destruction and damage to monuments to Vladimir Lenin in Ukraine from 8 December 2013 to present

— Kyiv, in which the monuments were dismantled or demolished during the relevant period
— Oblast capitals, in which monuments were dismantled or demolished during the relevant period
— City, in which the monuments were dismantled or demolished during the relevant period

— Rural settlements, villages, Urban-type settlements, in which the monuments were dismantled or demolished during the relevant period

== Motivation ==
The start of the "Leninopad" in its mass was laid by the demolition of the Lenin monument in Kyiv on the Bessarabian Square. The event took place on 8 December 2013 at around 6:00 pm. Even more people began to massively destroy monuments of the Soviet past after reports about the Euromaidan activists who died during the protests in Kyiv.

In January 2015, the Ministry of Culture of Ukraine announced that it would encourage all public initiatives related to cleaning Ukraine of monuments to figures of the communist past. According to Minister Vyacheslav Kyrylenko, his department will initiate the removal from the State Register of Immovable Monuments of Ukraine of all monuments related to communist figures listed there. "The state will not oppose, but on the contrary, will in every possible way support all public initiatives that will fight for the cleansing of Ukraine from these relics of the totalitarian past," the minister emphasized.

In April 2015, the Verkhovna Rada of Ukraine voted in favor of the draft law "On the condemnation of the communist and national socialist (Nazi) totalitarian regimes in Ukraine and the prohibition of propaganda of their symbols", which, in particular, will oblige local authorities to dismantle monuments to communist figures on the territory of Ukraine.

== Reactions ==
The removal of the monuments evoked mixed feelings among the Ukrainian population. In some cases, like in Kharkiv in early 2014, pro-Russian Ukrainian crowds protected the monuments, including members of the communist and socialist parties, as well as veterans of World War II and the Afghan wars. The statue of Lenin in Kharkiv was toppled on 28 September 2014. Late October 2014, then Kharkiv Governor Ihor Baluta admitted that he thought that the majority of Kharkiv residents had not wanted the statue removed, but said "there was hardly any protest afterward either, which is quite telling".

In January 2015, the Ministry of Culture of Ukraine announced that it would encourage any public initiatives related to the cleansing of Ukraine from "relics of the totalitarian past".

"It is not by chance that the demonstrations that we saw after the annexation of Crimea in the east and southeast of Ukraine were organized in the squares around the monuments to Lenin, with red flags with a hammer and sickle. What is happening now in Ukraine, what was instigated by Russian aggression, is a clash between the new Ukraine and the old Soviet Union, to which the current Russia is trying to return with the help of Ukraine, seizing parts of its territories. It is not clear to me why monuments to Lenin are being demolished only now in various cities of Ukraine; why all these 24 years they continued to stand; why didn't the state administration of an independent country demolish them earlier?

— Yuri Felshtinsky, Russian American historian, February 2015

== See also ==
- List of statues of Vladimir Lenin
- List of communist monuments in Ukraine
- Decommunization in Ukraine
- Derussification in Ukraine
- Lustration in Ukraine
- Demolition of monuments to Alexander Pushkin in Ukraine
- Removal of Confederate monuments and memorials

== Bibliography ==
- Nikiforov, Yevhen (2017). Decommunized: Ukrainian Soviet Mosaics. Berlin: DOM publishers. ISBN 978-3-86922-583-8.
- Nikiforov, Yevhen (2020). Art for Architecture. Ukraine. Soviet Modernist Mosaics from 1960 to 1990. Kyiv: DOM Publishers. p. 300. ISBN 978-3-86922-601-9.
- Ackermann, Niels; Gobert, Sébastien (2017). Looking for Lenin. London: FUEL Publishing. p. 176. ISBN 978-0993191176.
