= Kharkiv Police Battalion =

- Ukrainian: Батальйон патрульної служби поліції особливого призначення «Харків»
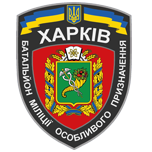
- Kharkiv Police Battalion insignia
- Active: 2015–present
- Country: Ukraine
- Branch: Ministry of Internal Affairs
- Type: Special Tasks Patrol Police
- Size: Battalion
- Engagements: War in Donbass; 2022 Russian invasion of Ukraine

The "Kharkiv" Police Battalion was formed in autumn 2015 from the special police unit battalion's "Kharkiv-1", "Kharkiv-2" and "Slobozhanshchyna". They have been involved in maintaining public order and guarding strategically important facilities in Mariupol.
