= List of diplomatic relations of Ukraine =

Ukraine has established diplomatic relations with numerous countries. Ukraine began moving towards independence from the Soviet Union with the Declaration of State Sovereignty of Ukraine on 16 July 1990. The ratification of Act of Declaration of Independence of Ukraine on 24 August 1991, by the Verkhovna Rada reestablished Ukrainian independence after the 1941 declaration of independence.

Two days after the 1991 Ukrainian independence referendum, neighboring Hungary became the first country to establish diplomatic relations with Ukraine on 3 December 1991, and Ukraine has since then established diplomatic relations with 183 of the 193 United Nations member countries, the Holy See, the State of Palestine, and the Sovereign Order of Malta.

By 2019, Ukraine had not suspended any diplomatic relations but relations with Russia and Syria were only nominal. Diplomatic relations with Russia were eventually cut on 24 February 2022, as a response to the 2022 Russian invasion of Ukraine. Diplomatic relations with Syria were cut on 30 June 2022, but were restored on 24 September 2025. Diplomatic relations with North Korea were cut on 13 July 2022. Diplomatic relations with Mali were cut on 4 August 2024. Diplomatic relations with Niger were cut on 6 August 2024. Diplomatic relations with Nicaragua were cut on 2 October 2025.

== Chronological list ==
List of countries which Ukraine maintains diplomatic relations with:

#	Country	Date
1	Hungary	3 December 1991
2	Lithuania	12 December 1991
3	Bulgaria	13 December 1991
4	Armenia	25 December 1991
5	Israel	26 December 1991
6	Belarus	27 December 1991
7	Moldova	27 December 1991
8	United States	3 January 1992
9	China	4 January 1992
10	Estonia	4 January 1992
11	Poland	4 January 1992
12	Argentina	6 January 1992
—	North Korea (suspended)	9 January 1992
13	Australia	10 January 1992
14	United Kingdom	10 January 1992
15	Sweden	13 January 1992
16	Mexico	14 January 1992
17	Greece	15 January 1992
18	Germany	17 January 1992
19	India	17 January 1992
20	Mongolia	21 January 1992
21	Iran	22 January 1992
22	Vietnam	23 January 1992
23	Austria	24 January 1992
24	France	24 January 1992
25	Egypt	25 January 1992
26	Sudan	25 January 1992
27	Japan	26 January 1992
28	Canada	27 January 1992
29	Portugal	27 January 1992
30	Chile	28 January 1992
31	Italy	29 January 1992
32	Spain	30 January 1992
33	Romania	1 February 1992
34	Turkey	3 February 1992
35	Norway	5 February 1992
36	Azerbaijan	6 February 1992
37	Burkina Faso	6 February 1992
38	Liechtenstein	6 February 1992
39	Switzerland	6 February 1992
40	Bolivia	8 February 1992
—	Holy See	8 February 1992
41	South Korea	10 February 1992
42	Brazil	11 February 1992
43	Denmark	12 February 1992
44	Latvia	12 February 1992
—	Russia (suspended)	14 February 1992
45	Croatia	18 February 1992
46	Czech Republic	18 February 1992
47	Cyprus	19 February 1992
48	Bangladesh	24 February 1992
49	Finland	26 February 1992
50	Malaysia	3 March 1992
51	New Zealand	3 March 1992
52	Malta	5 March 1992
53	Belgium	10 March 1992
54	Slovenia	10 March 1992
55	Cuba	12 March 1992
56	Pakistan	16 March 1992
57	South Africa	16 March 1992
58	Libya	17 March 1992
59	Cape Verde	25 March 1992
60	Iceland	30 March 1992
61	Singapore	31 March 1992
62	Syria	31 March 1992
63	Ireland	1 April 1992
64	Netherlands	1 April 1992
65	Guinea	4 April 1992
66	Philippines	7 April 1992
67	Benin	10 April 1992
68	Jordan	19 April 1992
69	Oman	19 April 1992
70	Yemen	21 April 1992
71	Cambodia	23 April 1992
72	Tajikistan	24 April 1992
73	Zimbabwe	25 April 1992
74	Thailand	6 May 1992
75	Peru	7 May 1992
76	Equatorial Guinea	18 May 1992
77	Uruguay	18 May 1992
78	Costa Rica	9 June 1992
79	Indonesia	11 June 1992
80	Ghana	17 June 1992
81	Morocco	22 June 1992
82	Tunisia	24 June 1992
83	Luxembourg	1 July 1992
84	Jamaica	7 July 1992
85	Tanzania	8 July 1992
86	Bahrain	20 July 1992
87	Georgia	22 July 1992
88	Kazakhstan	23 July 1992
89	Chad	27 July 1992
90	Algeria	10 August 1992
91	Colombia	18 August 1992
92	Uzbekistan	25 August 1992
93	Laos	17 September 1992
94	Kyrgyzstan	19 September 1992
95	Mauritania	30 September 1992
96	Namibia	5 October 1992
97	Turkmenistan	10 October 1992
98	Mauritius	12 October 1992
99	United Arab Emirates	15 October 1992
100	Ivory Coast	20 October 1992
—	Mali (suspended)	5 November 1992
101	Senegal	25 November 1992
—	Nicaragua (suspended)	30 November 1992
102	Nigeria	10 December 1992
103	Lebanon	14 December 1992
104	Iraq	16 December 1992
105	Guatemala	12 January 1993
106	Albania	13 January 1993
107	Nepal	15 January 1993
108	Sri Lanka	15 January 1993
109	Bosnia and Herzegovina	30 January 1993
110	Slovakia	30 January 1993
111	Burundi	22 February 1993
112	Paraguay	26 February 1993
113	Antigua and Barbuda	17 March 1993
114	Ethiopia	1 April 1993
115	Barbados	13 April 1993
116	Qatar	13 April 1993
117	Saudi Arabia	14 April 1993
118	Kuwait	18 April 1993
119	Zambia	22 April 1993
120	Ecuador	27 April 1993
121	Kenya	5 May 1993
122	Panama	21 May 1993
123	Madagascar	10 June 1993
124	Comoros	23 July 1993
125	Maldives	17 August 1993
126	Mozambique	28 August 1993
127	Gabon	1 September 1993
128	Rwanda	8 September 1993
129	Venezuela	29 September 1993
130	Angola	30 September 1993
131	Cameroon	21 October 1993
132	Eritrea	20 December 1993
133	Serbia	15 April 1994
134	Uganda	10 September 1994
135	Seychelles	30 September 1994
136	Afghanistan	17 April 1995
137	North Macedonia	20 April 1995
138	Central African Republic	14 July 1995
139	San Marino	30 October 1995
140	Marshall Islands	22 December 1995
141	Andorra	19 April 1996
142	Brunei	3 October 1997
143	São Tomé and Príncipe	16 April 1998
144	Eswatini	13 May 1998
145	Liberia	24 September 1998
146	Malawi	22 December 1998
147	Myanmar	19 January 1999
148	Democratic Republic of the Congo	13 April 1999
149	El Salvador	14 April 1999
150	Sierra Leone	20 May 1999
151	Republic of the Congo	3 June 1999
152	Gambia	2 July 1999
153	Togo	1 September 1999
154	Federated States of Micronesia	17 September 1999
155	Trinidad and Tobago	27 September 1999
156	Vanuatu	29 September 1999
157	Belize	1 October 1999
—	Niger (suspended)	1 October 1999
158	Lesotho	1 June 2000
159	Dominican Republic	21 September 2000
—	State of Palestine	2 November 2001
160	Guyana	15 November 2001
161	Honduras	18 September 2002
162	Bahamas	27 September 2003
163	Timor-Leste	27 September 2003
164	Botswana	4 March 2004
165	Montenegro	22 August 2006
166	Suriname	20 September 2006
167	Monaco	26 July 2007
—	Sovereign Military Order of Malta	9 February 2008
168	Guinea-Bissau	22 February 2009
169	Djibouti	17 March 2009
170	Haiti	23 September 2010
171	Saint Lucia	24 September 2010
172	Solomon Islands	27 September 2011
173	South Sudan	25 September 2012
174	Tuvalu	27 September 2012
175	Fiji	23 September 2013
176	Samoa	23 September 2013
177	Saint Kitts and Nevis	8 June 2015
178	Dominica	25 April 2019
179	Saint Vincent and the Grenadines	25 September 2019
180	Grenada	26 September 2019
181	Palau	16 June 2024
182	Somalia	11 April 2025
183	Papua New Guinea	25 September 2025

== No relations ==
Sovereign states which do not maintain diplomatic relations with Ukraine:

- Bhutan
- Kiribati
- Mali (Since 4 August 2024)
- Nauru
- Nicaragua (since 2 October 2025)
- Niger (Since 6 August 2024)
- North Korea (Since 13 July 2022)
- Russia (Since 24 February 2022)
- Tonga

== See also ==
- Foreign relations of Ukraine
