= Volodymyr Hrynyov =

Ukrainian politician

- Володимир Гриньов
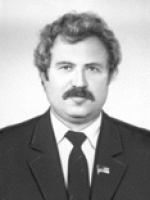

People's Deputy of Ukraine
- In office May 1990 – May 1994
- Preceded by: Position established
- Succeeded by: Volodymyr Aleksieiev
- Constituency: Kharkiv Oblast, Industrialnyi District

Personal details
- Born: 26 July 1945 (age 81) Bolshetroitskoye, Kursk Oblast, Russian SFSR, Soviet Union
- Party: Party of Democratic Revival of Ukraine
- Other political affiliations: Communist Party of the Soviet Union; Inter-regional Bloc of Reforms (MBR)
- Education: Kharkiv Polytechnical Institute (DTN, 1981)
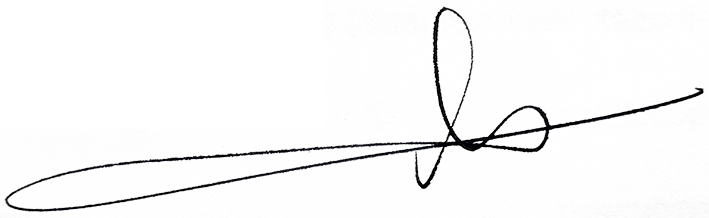
- Signature

Volodymyr Borysovych Hrynyov, also Hryniov (Ukrainian: Володимир Борисович Гриньов; Russian: Владимир Борисович Гринёв, romanized: Vladimir Borisovich Grinyov; born 26 July 1945) is a Ukrainian politician who was a People's Deputy of Ukraine from 1990 to 1994, representing Kharkiv's Industrialnyi District. He was an unsuccessful candidate in the 1991 Ukrainian presidential election.

== Biography ==
Volodymyr Borysovych Hrynyov was born on 26 July 1945, in the village of Bolshetroitskoye, in the Kursk Oblast of the Russian Soviet Federative Socialist Republic (now Belgorod Oblast, Russia). In 1968 he graduated with honors from the Kharkiv Polytechnical Institute. In 1972 he defended his Candidate of Sciences dissertation, and in 1981, his doctoral dissertation.

Hrynyov was a candidate in the 1990 Ukrainian Supreme Soviet election in the city of Kharkiv's Industrialnyi District. In the first round, none of the five candidates obtained the required 50% of votes; in the second round he obtained 53.49% votes and was elected to the Verkhovna Rada (Ukrainian parliament). In Verkhovna Rada, Hrynov was elected vice chairman. He served in the position until his voluntary resignation in June 1993.

Hrynov participated in the first presidential elections in Ukraine. He was supported by 1,329,758 voters (4.17%), and took fourth place out of six candidates. In 1993 he became the president of International Fund "Business Diaspora of Ukraine". In the same year he organized the Party "Inter-regional Bloc of Reforms", of which he was the leader until May 1999.

On 27 March 1994, Hrynyov participated in the parliamentary elections in the same electoral district in Kharkiv. He obtained less than 50% of votes in the first round. In the second round his opponent withdrew from elections, and Hrynyov obtained 75.64%. Because Hrynov was the only candidate, and the elections required alternatives, Hrynov was not recognized as being elected to the Verkhovna Rada.

Hrynyov attempted to run for the President of Ukraine position in the ahead-of-schedule presidential elections of 1994, but he withdrew in favor of Leonid Kuchma, who was elected president. Hrynov was appointed as an advisor to the President.

In 1998 Hrynyov participated in the parliamentary elections as one of the leaders of SLON, but his block obtained less than one percent of votes and no seats in the parliament.

Over his political career, Hrynyov had been criticized by opponents for being a liberal, a pro-Russian politician, a supporter of the federate system of Ukraine, and for changing political preferences too often. In 2002, Hrynyov supported Viktor Yushchenko, and his Our Ukraine Bloc, but was not a member of the block himself. In the 2000s, Hrynyov was the vice-president of the Interregional Academy of Personnel Management (MAUP).

Hrynyov is married, has a son and daughter. He speaks English and German. He is a sport master in judo, and sambo.
