= Gert Weisskirchen =

German politician

Gert Weißkirchen
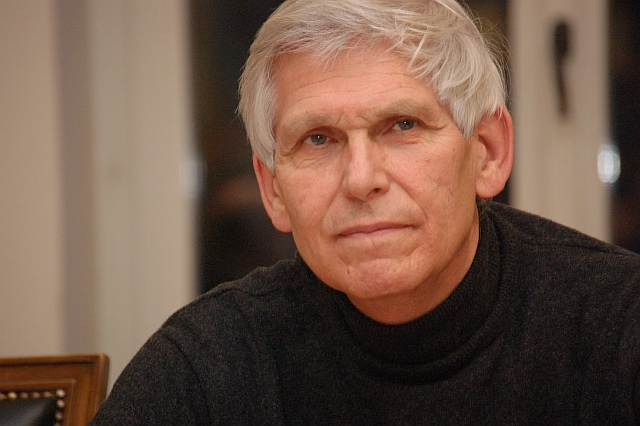
- Gert Weißkirchen in 2006

Member of the German Parliament for Baden-Württemberg
- In office 1976–2009

Personal details
- Born: 16 May 1944 (age 82) Heidelberg
- Citizenship: German
- Party: Social Democrat
- Spouse: Renate Weisskirchen (1969–present)
- Education: College of Education in Heidelberg
- Committees: Bundestag committee on Education and Science; OCSE committee for Humanitarian Affairs and Human Rights

Gert Weisskirchen (or Weißkirchen; born 16 May 1944 in Heidelberg) is a German politician (Social Democratic Party of Germany [SPD]).

== Life and career ==
Weisskirchen graduated from the Gymnasium Wiesloch in 1960 and then went to the Higher Commercial School in Heidelberg until 1962. He then graduated from the College of Education in Heidelberg and Karlsruhe and further studied education, political science and economic and social history at the University of Heidelberg. From 1969 to 1972 Weisskirchen was a teacher at the Epping high school, and from 1972 to 1975 worked as scientific assistant at the Heidelberg College of Education. Then until his leave of absence in 1980 he was Professor of Social Education at the University of Applied Sciences Wiesbaden. Since 1995 he has been Honorary Professor of Applied Cultural Studies at the University of Applied Sciences Potsdam.

Weisskirchen has been married since 1969 and has one daughter.

== Party ==
Weisskirchen joined the SPD in 1966 and became involved first with the Young Socialists; he was a member of the State Executive Committee in Baden-Württemberg from 1969 to 1972; from 1971 to 1972 as state chairman.

From 1973 to 1991 Weisskirchen was chairman of the SPD district association Rhein-Neckar and from 1973 to 1997 a member of the executive committee of the SPD in Baden-Württemberg.

== Member of Parliament ==
From 1976 to 2009 he was member of the German Bundestag. From 1976 to 1980 he was deputy chairman and from 1980 to 1983 chairman of the SPD parliamentary group in the Bundestag Committee on Education and Science. From 1987 to 1990 he headed the defense conversion working group of the SPD parliamentary group, and was also chairman of the SPD parliamentary group "Education 2000". In December 1991 he was the only member of the Bundestag to observe the Ukrainian referendum on independence. From 1993 to 1998 he was speaker of United Nations working group and from 1998 to 1999 Group Spokesman on culture and media. From November 1998 to October 2007 Weisskirchen was on the board of the SPD parliamentary party and was from 1999 to 2009 speaker of the group working party on foreign policy. Gert Weisskirchen has always been a representative of Baden-Württemberg state in the Bundestag.

From 1994 to 2009 Weisskirchen was a member of the German delegation to the Parliamentary Assembly of the Organization for Security and Co-operation in Europe (OSCE), where from 1997 to 2002 he was Chairman of the Committee for Humanitarian Affairs and Human Rights. He was then to 2005 Vice President of the Parliamentary Assembly. From 2005 to 2008, Weisskirchen was Personal Representative of the OSCE chairman on anti-Semitism. In 2009 Weisskirchen did not run as a candidate for the Bundestag.

== Other activities ==
- Documentation and Cultural Centre of German Sinti and Roma, Member of the Board of Trustees
