= Leopold Taburyanskyi =

Ukrainian politician

- Леопольд Табурянський
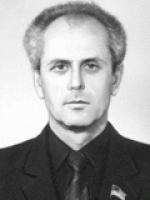
- Official portrait, 1990

People's Deputy of Ukraine
- In office 15 May 1990 – 10 May 1994
- Preceded by: Position established
- Succeeded by: Serhii Chukmasov
- Constituency: Dnipropetrovsk Oblast, Petrovskyi

Personal details
- Born: 22 July 1940 (age 86) Kryvyi Rih, Ukrainian SSR, Soviet Union (now Ukraine)
- Party: People's Party of Ukraine (1991-1993)
- Other political affiliations: Democratic Bloc
- Children: Ruslan
- Education: Dnipropetrovsk Industrial College

Military service
- Allegiance: Soviet Union
- Branch/service: Soviet Army
- Years of service: 1959

Leopold Ivanovych Taburyanskyi (Ukrainian: Леопольд Іванович Табурянський; born 22 July 1940) is a Ukrainian politician who served as a People's Deputy of Ukraine from Dnipropetrovsk Oblast from 1990 to 1994. He was a candidate in the 1991 Ukrainian presidential election, where he gathered 0.57% of the vote.

== Early life and career ==
Leopold Ivanovych Taburyanskyi was born 22 July 1940 in the city of Kryvyi Rih, located in southeastern Ukraine. Taburyanskyi grew up in an ethnically-Ukrainian, working-class family. From 1954 to 1958 he studied at the Dnipropetrovsk Industrial College, subsequently serving as a conscript in the Soviet Army for a year in 1959.

== Political life ==
On 4 March 1990, Taburyanskyi was elected with 64.05% votes (out of 6 candidates) as a member of Verkhovna Rada (parliament) of the Ukrainian SSR. He was elected in Petrovskyi, an election district in the city of Dnipropetrovsk, and he was a member of the Democratic Bloc opposition faction. On 27 September 1991, he established the People's Party of Ukraine (1991–93) and in December 1991 participated in the presidential elections where he gathered some 182,713 votes placing last (0.57%).

Taburyanskyi was not able to be reelected to the Verkhovna Rada in 1994. The same year he lost his son under mysterious circumstances. Taburyanskyi tried to be reelected in 1998, however - was not successful. In 2000-01 he participated in the protest Ukraine without Kuchma and was one of those who undersigned the declaration of the Civil Committee in protection of Constitution. In 2002 Taburyanskyi was once again unsuccessful to be reelected to the parliament.
