= Peter Potichnyj =

American and Canadian political scientist and historian (1930–2026)

- Петро Потічний
- Born: Petro Iosyp Potichnyj; June 2, 1930; Pawłokoma, Poland
- Died: June 3, 2026 (aged 96)

Academic background
- Education: Temple University (BA); Columbia University (MA, PhD)

Academic work
- Discipline: Political scientist, historian
- Sub-discipline: Ukrainian studies
- Institutions: Upsala College; Wilfrid Laurier University; Ukrainian Free University; McMaster University
- Notable works: Litopys UPA
- Military career
- Allegiance: Ukrainian Insurgent Army; United States
- Branch: Ukrainian Insurgent Army; United States Marine Corps
- Conflicts: World War II; Anti-Soviet resistance by the Ukrainian Insurgent Army; Korean War

Peter Joseph Potichnyj (Ukrainian: Петро́-Йо́сип Петро́вич Потічни́й, romanized: Petro-Yosyp Petrovych Potichnyi; June 2, 1930 – June 3, 2026) was a Ukrainian-born American and Canadian political scientist and historian. Potichnyj had been professor emeritus of political science at McMaster University since 2013; he previously served as professor of political science there from 1964. He was also the former dean of law and political science at the Ukrainian Free University, as well as co-editor of the Litopys UPA series.

== Life and career ==
Peter Joseph Potichnyj was born on June 2, 1930, in the village of Pawłokoma, located in Poland. The Potichnyj family had its roots in the Kingdom of Galicia–Volhynia, and a branch of the family was part of the Hungarian bourgeois class by the 18th century. Potichnyj's branch, which was impoverished, moved to Pawłokoma. On his paternal side, his family was regarded as being Polish due to their belief in Roman Catholicism, while his maternal family belonged to the Ukrainian Greek Catholic Church and was therefore considered Ukrainian. His father's conversion to Greek Catholicism led to harassment by the government of the Second Polish Republic, leading Potichnyj to develop a Ukrainian nationalist attitude at a young age.

Potichnyj studied at the Lwów Academic Gymnasium, graduating in 1944. In 1945, at the age of 14, he joined the Ukrainian Insurgent Army and fought in a sotnia under the command of Mykhailo Duda. Along with other members of the unit, Potichnyj travelled to West Germany in 1947 to demonstrate that Ukrainians were fighting the Soviet Union. He later recounted that most of the unit was either killed or captured by the militaries of the Polish People's Republic or the Czechoslovak Socialist Republic; of the 160 men that left Ukraine on the journey to West Germany, only 36 arrived.

From West Germany, after completing his secondary education in Munich, Potichnyj migrated to the United States in 1950. He fought in the Korean War as a member of the United States Marine Corps before studying at Temple University, where he acquired a Bachelor of Arts in 1957. He also studied at Columbia University, earning a Master of Arts in 1961 and a PhD in 1964.

He began teaching political science at McMaster University in 1964. He also taught political science at Upsala College and Wilfrid Laurier University. He met Canadian Jewish historian Howard Aster c. 1971 and worked alongside him on the history of Ukrainian–Jewish ethnic relations for over a decade, with their book, Ukrainian-Jewish Relations in Historical Perspective, being published in 1988. Aster has described Potichnyj as part of a generation of interwar and post-World War II European émigrés to Canada responsible for shaping the development of social sciences in North America.

Potichnyj was a consultant to Heilongjiang University from 1985. From 1995 to 1996 he was dean of law and political science at the Ukrainian Free University. Potichnyj also began chronicling the history of the Ukrainian Insurgent Army in 1976. It was for this, according to academic Bohdan Klid, that Potichnyj would become most known.

In 2008 Potichnyj was awarded the Order of Merit 3rd degree by Ukrainian President Viktor Yushchenko.

He became professor emeritus of political science at McMaster University in 2013.

Potichnyj died on June 3, 2026, at the age of 96.
