= Litopys UPA =

- Country of origin: Canada, Ukraine
- Headquarters location: Toronto, Lviv
- Publication types: Books, Calendars
- Nonfiction topics: History of the Ukrainian Insurgent Army
- Official website: www.litopysupa.com

The Litopys UPA volume series was created under the auspices of the Litopys UPA Publishing Company, an Ontario Corporation Without Share Capital incorporated in 1978. Publishing primary source, archival material and documents, and first person accounts that relate to the military history of the Ukrainian Insurgent Army, underground resistance organizations, as well as the history of Ukraine during World War II and post-war decade. Each volume or group of volumes is devoted to a specific theme. Some deal with the military history in a specific period of time or region - for example, in Volyn, in Halychyna, as in the regions of Ukraine under Poland and so on. Two, three, or more volumes may be devoted to specicific themes. Memoirs, or books by individual authors dealing with particular questions, offer insight into individual topics. Ukrainian language with English introductions.

== Books ==
=== Main series ===
All of these URLs are bad. The correct ones can be found on Litopys's orientation page to the series.

1. Volume 1. Volyn' and Polissya. German occupation. Book one
2. Volume 2. Volyn' and Polissya. German occupation. Book two: Military activities of UPA
3. Volume 3. Chornyi Lis. Reprint of the UPA underground journal. Book one
4. Volume 4. Chornyi Lis. Reprint of the UPA underground journal. Book two
5. Volume 5. Volyn' and Polissya. German occupation. Book three: The personal accounts of underground struggle
6. Volume 6. The UPA in light of German documents. Book one: 1942 - June 1944
7. Volume 7. The UPA in light of German documents. Book two: June 1944 - April 1945
8. Volume 8. Ukrainian Supreme Liberation Council. Documents, official publications, papers. Book one: 1944-9145
9. Volume 9. Ukrainian Supreme Liberation Council. Documents, official publications, papers. Book two: 1946-1948
10. Volume 10. Ukrainian Supreme Liberation Council. Documents, official publications, papers. Book three: 1949-1952
11. Volume 11. Short biographies of fallen members of the Ukrainian underground Ternopil region
12. Volume 12. UPA's 3 Podillia military region
13. Volume 13. Peremyshl region: Peremyshl battalion. Book one: Journals of the 'Burlaka' Detachment (Udarnyky 4, 94a)
14. Volume 14. Peremyshl region: Peremyshl battalion. Book two: Journals of the 'Krylach' Detachment (Udarnyky 6, 96a)
15. Volume 15. Memoirs of the commander of a special task unit
16. Volume 16. Underground journals from Ukraine beyond the Curzon line
17. Volume 17. English language publications of the ukrainian underground
18. Volume 18. The UPA's group 'Hoverlia'. Book one: Reports and official publications
19. Volume 19. The UPA's group 'Hoverlia'. Book two: Memoirs, articles and publications of historical nature
20. Volume 20. Index to 'Litopys UPA'. Book one: 1-19 Volumes
21. Volume 21. The UPA in light of German documents. Book three: June 1941 - May 1943
22. Volume 22. The UPA in light of Polish documents. Book one: The Military Court of the Operation Group
23. Volume 23. UPA medical services
24. Volume 24. Idea and Action. Journal of the OUN Leadership, 1942-1946. Reprint of the underground journal
25. Volume 25. Songs of the UPA
26. Volume 26. Ukrainian Supreme Liberation Council. Documents, official publications, papers. Book four: Documents and Personal Accounts
27. Volume 27. For Ukraine, for her freedom. Memoirs
28. Volume 28. Thousands of roads. Memoirs
29. Volume 29. From youthful dreams into ranks of the UPA
30. Volume 30. Through the laughter of iron. Chronicles
31. Volume 31. The UPA in Lviv and Yaroslav regions. Memoirs and documents of UPA soldiers in tactical sector 'Roztochchia' 1943-1947
32. Volume 32. UPA medical services. Book two
33. Volume 33. UPA Tactical sector 26th
34. Volume 34. Lemkivschyna and Peremyshl regions. Political reports. Documents
35. Volume 35. Index to 'Litopys UPA'. Book two: 21-34 volumes, 1-3 volumes New series, 1-3 volumes series 'Biblioteka', 'Povstan'ski Mohyly'
36. Volume 36. Book of the fallen members of OUN and UPA of the L'viv region
37. Volume 37. At the edge of a dream and reality (memoirs of revolutionary). At the edge of two worlds (memoirs)
38. Volume 38. Architecture of resistance: hideouts and bunkers of the UPA in soviet documents
39. Volume 39. UPA Tactical Sector 28th 'Danyliv': Kholm and Pidliashshia Regions
40. Volume 40. UPA Tactical Sector 27th 'Bastion': Lubachiv, Tomashiv and Yaroslav Regions (Documents and Materials)
41. Volume 41. Kyrylo Os'mak - President of the Ukrainian Supreme Liberation Council
42. Volume 42. Litopys UPA - A History. Documents and Materials
43. Volume 43. Struggle against Agentura: Protocols of Interrogation of the OUN SB in Ternopil Region 1946-1948. Book 1
44. Volume 44. Struggle against Agentura: Protocols of Interrogation of the OUN SB in Ternopil Region 1946-1948. Book 2
45. Volume 45. General Roman Shukhevych – "Taras Chuprynka" Commander in Chief of the UPA
46. Volume 46. Struggle against Agentura: Protocols of Interrogation of the OUN SB in Ternopil Region 1946-1948. Book 3
47. Volume 47. The Ukrainian Underground Post
48. Volume 48. THE UPA IN LIGHT OF SLOVAK AND CZECH DOCUMENTS (1945 – 1948)
49. Volume 49. THE TERNOPIL REGION: “News from the Field” and “News from the Ternopil Region”1943 – 1950. Book One (1943-1947)
50. Volume 50. THE TERNOPIL REGION “News from the Field” and “News from the Ternopil Region”. 1943 – 1950. Book Two (1948-1950)

=== New series ===
1. Volume 1. Publications of the UPA Supreme Command
2. Volume 2. Volyn and Polissia: UPA and its Rear Line. 1943-1944. Documents and Materials
3. Volume 3. The Struggle against the UPA and the Nationalist Underground: instructional Documents of the Central Committee of the Communist Party of Ukraine. 1943-1959
4. Volume 4. The Struggle against the UPA and the Nationalist Underground: Informational Documents of the Central Committee of the Communist Party (Bolshevik) of Ukraine, Party obkoms, NKVD-MVD, MGB-KGB. Book one: 1943-1945
5. Volume 5. The Struggle against the UPA and the Nationalist Underground: Informational Documents of the Central Committee of the Communist Party (Bolshevik) of Ukraine, Party obkoms, NKVD-MVD, MGB-KGB. Book two: 1946-1947
6. Volume 6. The Struggle against the UPA and the Nationalist Underground: Informational Documents of the Central Committee of the Communist Party (Bolshevik) of Ukraine, Party obkoms, NKVD-MVD, MGB-KGB. Book three: 1948
7. Volume 7. The Struggle against the UPA and the Nationalist Underground: Informational Documents of the Central Committee of the Communist Party (Bolshevik) of Ukraine, Party obkoms, NKVD-MVD, MGB-KGB. Book four: 1949-1959
8. Volume 8. Volyn, Polissia, Podillia: UPA and its Rear Line 1944-1946. Documents and Materials
9. Volume 9. The Struggle Against Insurgent Movement and the Nationalist Underground: Interrogation Protocols of OUN and UPA Leaders Arrested by the Soviet State Security Organs. 1944-1945
10. Volume 10. The life and struggle of general “Taras Chuprynka” (1907 – 1950). Documents and Materials
11. Volume 11. The OUN(B) network and the UPA rear line services on the territory of the Military Districts (VO) "Zahrava", "Turiv", "Bohun" (August 1942 - December 1943)
12. Volume 12. Military OkruhaUPA “Buh: ”Documents and Materials. 1943-1952. Book 1
13. Volume 13. Military OkruhaUPA “Buh: ”Documents and Materials. 1943-1952. Book 2
14. Volume 14. The UPA and Rear Line in North-Western Ukrainian Lands. 1943-1945. New documents.
15. Volume 15. The Struggle Against Insurgent Movement and the Nationalist Underground: Interrogation Protocols Of OUN and UPA Leaders Arrested by the Soviet State Security Organs. 1945-1954. Book 2
16. Volume 16. Volyn’ and Polissia in the Unknown Correspondence of the OUN and the UPA. 1944–1954
17. Volume 17. OSYP DIAKIV - “HORNOVYI”. Documents and Materials
18. Volume 18. OUN and UPA Activities on the Territory of East-Central and Southern Ukraine
19. Volume 19. The OUN Underground in Bukovyna: 1943-1951. Documents and Materials
20. Volume 20. The UPA’s Military Okruha “Lysonia” 1943-1952 Documents and Materials
21. Volume 21. Yaroslav Starukh: Documents and Materials

=== Litopys UPA - Library ===
1. Volume 1. My past life
2. Volume 2. UPA raids through Czechoslovakia
3. Volume 3. The wounds would not heal.
4. Volume 4. Memoirs of the UPA Soldiers and the Members of the Armed Underground in L'viv and Liubachiv Regions
5. Volume 5. Search guide register of persons connected to the liberation struggle in Lviv Oblast (less Drohobych region) 1944-1947 (based on archival documents)
6. Volume 6. SEARCH GUIDE. Register of persons connected to the liberation struggle in Drohobych Oblast 1939-1950 (Based on archival documents)
7. Volume 7. The activities of OUN(B) and the UPA rear line in Volyn and Southern Polissia (1941–1944)
8. Volume 8. "The sun was smiling at us through rusty bars…" Kateryna Zaryts’ka in the Ukrainian national-liberation movement
9. Volume 9. With Ukraine in my heart. Memoirs
10. Volume 10. Nil Khasevych – His Life and Art
11. Volume 11. Youth Organizations Within the OUN (1939-1955)

=== Series "Events and People" ===
1. Volume 1. The Staunch Commander
2. Volume 2. Kyrylo Os'mak - The Unbowed President of UHVR
3. Volume 3. Stepan Bandera - Life Dedicated to Freedom
4. Volume 4/1. My Journey. Part I
5. Volume 4/2. My Journey. Part II
6. Volume 4/3. My Journey. Part III
7. Volume 5. «Hrim» - Colonel of the UPA Mykola Tverdokhlib. Memoirs and Materials
8. Volume 6. Petro Fedun-”Poltava”: The Leading Ideologist of the OUN and the UPA
9. Volume 7. UKRAINIAN SUPREME LIBERATION COUNCIL
10. Volume 8. THE Flower in Red Hell: The Life of Liudmyla Foia
11. Volume 9. The Life and Fate of Mykhailo Diachenko-”Marko Boieslav”
12. Volume 10. The Life of Halyna Holoiad – «Marta Hai»
13. Volume 11. A Portrait of Osyp Diakiv-“Hornovyi”
14. Volume 12. Zynoviy Tershakovets “Fedir”
15. Volume 13. Notes of the Insurgent
16. Volume 14. Yaroslav Bohdan – «Vsevolod Ramzenko»
17. Volume 15. The Path of Struggle of Vasyl Senchak “Voron”
18. Volume 16. The Brothers Busel: Lives for Ukraine
19. Volume 17. THE SHINING SPIRIT OF THE LEVYTSKY FAMILY
20. Volume 18. Rostyslav Voloshyn
21. Volume 19. Mykola Krychun «Cheremshyna»
22. Volume 20. The OUN Underground Printing Presses and Their Liquidation by the USSR Repressive Organs in the years 1944-1954
23. Volume 21. Leadership of the OUN in Karpats’kyi Krai
24. Volume 22. Oleh Sztul in the Struggle for Ukraine
25. Volume 23. Uliana Kriuchenko – «Oksana»
26. Volume 24. Omelian Poliovyi – «Ostap»

=== The graves of insurgents ===
1. Volume 1. Powstanski mohyly. Memorial Book Fallen on the Field of Glory Soldiers of the Ukrainian Insurgent Army-West from Military Region VI 'Sian', Military Districts 'Lemko', 'Bastion', 'Danyliv' (1944-1946)

=== Other related books ===
1. Tyt bulo nashe selo
2. V riadakh UPA
3. U velykomu reidi
4. Almanac. Society of Veterans of the Ukrainian Insurgent Army in the USA
5. Selo Verbytsia... Zalyshylas lysh smuha pam'iati
6. In the name Your
7. UPA warfare in Ukraine
8. MY FATHER’S CASE
9. Volume 1. Memoirs and Thoughts: From the Rivers Bystrytsia to Buh (1911-1929)
10. Volume 2. Memoirs and Thoughts: Friends in Combat. Book one
11. Volume 3. Memoirs and Thoughts: Friends in Combat. Book two
12. Volume 4. Memoirs and Thoughts: Bereza Kartuz'ka and Years of Struggle

=== The 100 Book Catalogue Summary ===
1. Litopys UPA. Catalogue 100 volumes (1973-2012)

=== Administration in Canada and USA ===
B. Kowalyk, R. Kulyk, Z. Brozyna

=== Editors and Administration in Ukraine ===
M. Romaniuk - editor-in-chief, A. Sova - deputy editor, I. Homziak, B. Stoliar - administration
