= Sarah Birch =

American political scientist and academic

Sarah Birch FRSE FBA
- Born: 5 December 1963 (age 62); Boston, Massachusetts, United States

Academic background
- Education: Dartmouth College; University of Oxford; University of Essex

Academic work
- Discipline: Political science
- Sub-discipline: Comparative politics; Political ethics; Electoral fraud
- Institutions: University of Essex; University of Glasgow; King's College London

Sarah Birch, FRSE, FBA (born 5 December 1963) is an American political scientist and academic, specialising in comparative politics. Since 2016, she has been Professor of Political Science at King's College London. She had taught at the University of Essex between 1996 and 2013, and held the Chair of Comparative Politics at the University of Glasgow between 2013 and 2016.

== Early life and education ==
Birch was born on 5 December 1963 in Boston, Massachusetts, United States. She was educated at Dartmouth College, and, having majored in comparative literature, graduated with a Bachelor of Arts (BA) degree in 1985. She then moved to the United Kingdom to study at the Faculty of Medieval and Modern Languages, University of Oxford. She graduated with a Master of Philosophy (MPhil) degree in European literature in 1988, and completed a Doctor of Philosophy (DPhil) degree in 1992. Her doctoral thesis was titled "Christine Brooke-Rose and post-war writing in France".

Having earned three degrees in literature, Birch turned to politics. She studied political behaviour at the University of Essex, graduating with a Master of Arts (MA) degree in 1994. She remained at Essex to gain a further Doctor of Philosophy (PhD) degree, which she completed in 1998. Her doctoral thesis was entitled "The social determinants of electoral behaviour in Ukraine, 1989-1994".

== Academic career ==
In 1996, while still studying for her second doctorate, Birch was appointed a lecturer at the University of Essex. She was promoted to Reader in 2003, and appointed Professor of Politics in 2012. From 2002 to 2011, she served as a co-editor of the British Journal of Political Science. In July 2013, she joined the University of Glasgow where she had been appointed to the Chair of Comparative Politics. In 2016, she joined King's College London as Professor of Political Science and Director of Research of its Department of Political Economy.

== Honours ==
In 2013, Birch was elected a Fellow of the British Academy (FBA), the United Kingdom's national academy for the humanities and social sciences. In 2016, she was elected a Fellow of the Royal Society of Edinburgh (FRSE), Scotland's national academy of science and letters. In 2018, she was elected a Fellow of the Academy of Social Sciences.

== Selected works ==
- Birch, Sarah (2011). Electoral malpractice. Oxford: Oxford University Press. ISBN 978-0199606160.
- Allen, Nicholas; Birch, Sarah (2015). Ethics and Integrity in British Politics: How Citizens Judge their Politicians' Conduct and Why It Matters. Cambridge: Cambridge University Press. ISBN 978-1107050501.
