= Ihor Yukhnovskyi =

Ukrainian independence activist and politician (1925–2024)

Hero of Ukraine Ihor Yukhnovskyi
- Ігор Юхновський
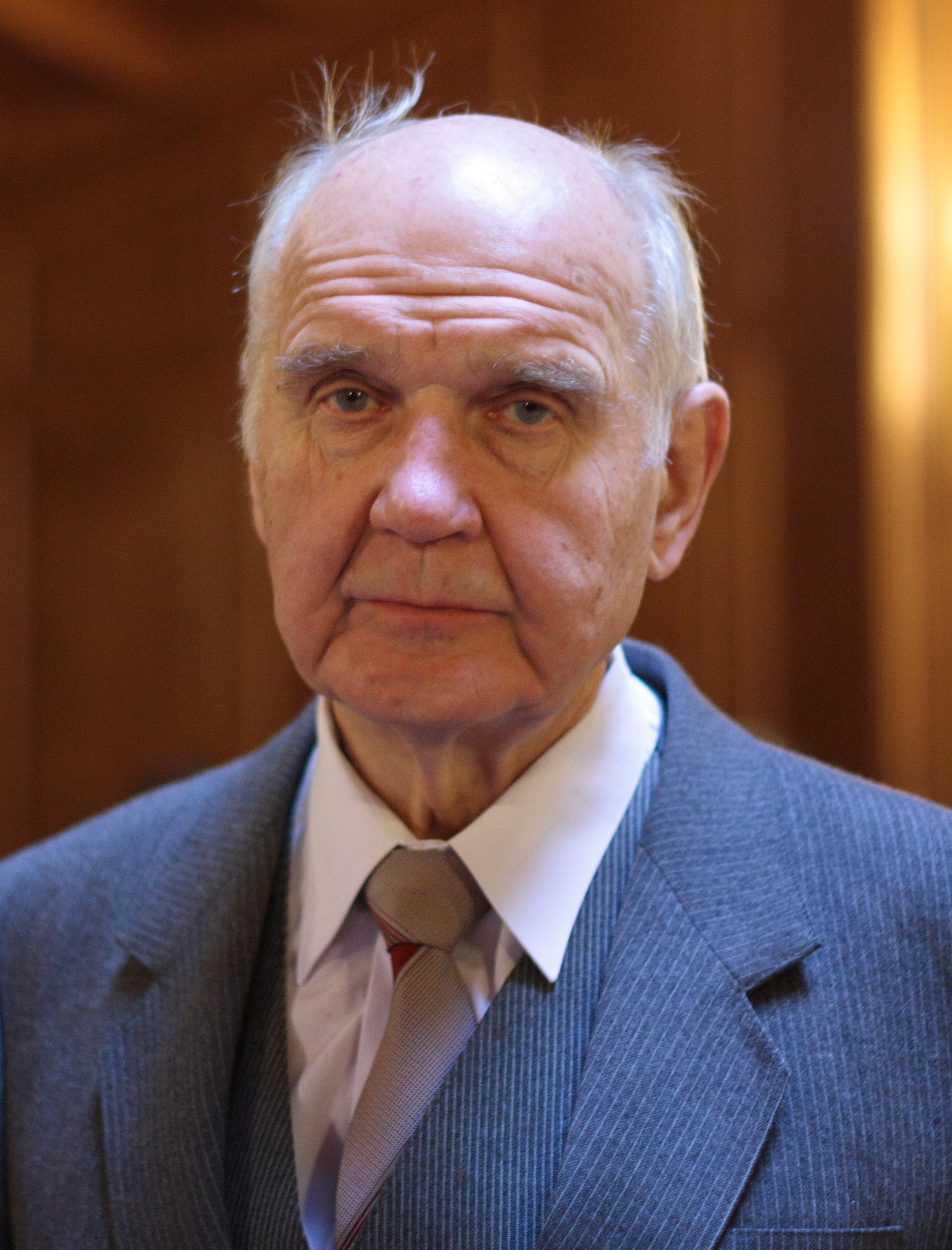
- Yukhnovskyi in 2009

Head of the Ukrainian Institute of National Remembrance
- In office 22 May 2006 – 18 July 2010
- Preceded by: Position established
- Succeeded by: Valeriy Soldatenko

People's Deputy of Ukraine
- In office 14 May 2002 – 25 May 2006
- Constituency: Our Ukraine Bloc, No. 68
- In office 12 May 1998 – 14 May 2002
- Constituency: People's Movement of Ukraine, No. 15
- In office 12 May 1994 – 12 May 1998
- Constituency: No. 263
- In office 15 May 1990 – 12 May 1994
- Constituency: No.263

3rd First Deputy Prime Minister of Ukraine
- In office October 1992 – March 1993
- Prime Minister: Leonid Kuchma
- Preceded by: Valentyn Symonenko
- Succeeded by: Yukhym Zvyahilsky

Personal details
- Born: 1 September 1925 Kniahynyne, Dubno powiat, Wołyń Voivodeship, Poland (now Rivne Oblast, Ukraine)
- Died: 26 March 2024 (aged 98) Lviv, Ukraine
- Party: Ukrainian People's Party
- Other political affiliations: People's Movement of Ukraine
- Spouse: Nina Yukhnovska
- Children: Natalia (1952); Pavlo (1957)
- Education: Lviv University
- Occupation: Physicist, politician, writer
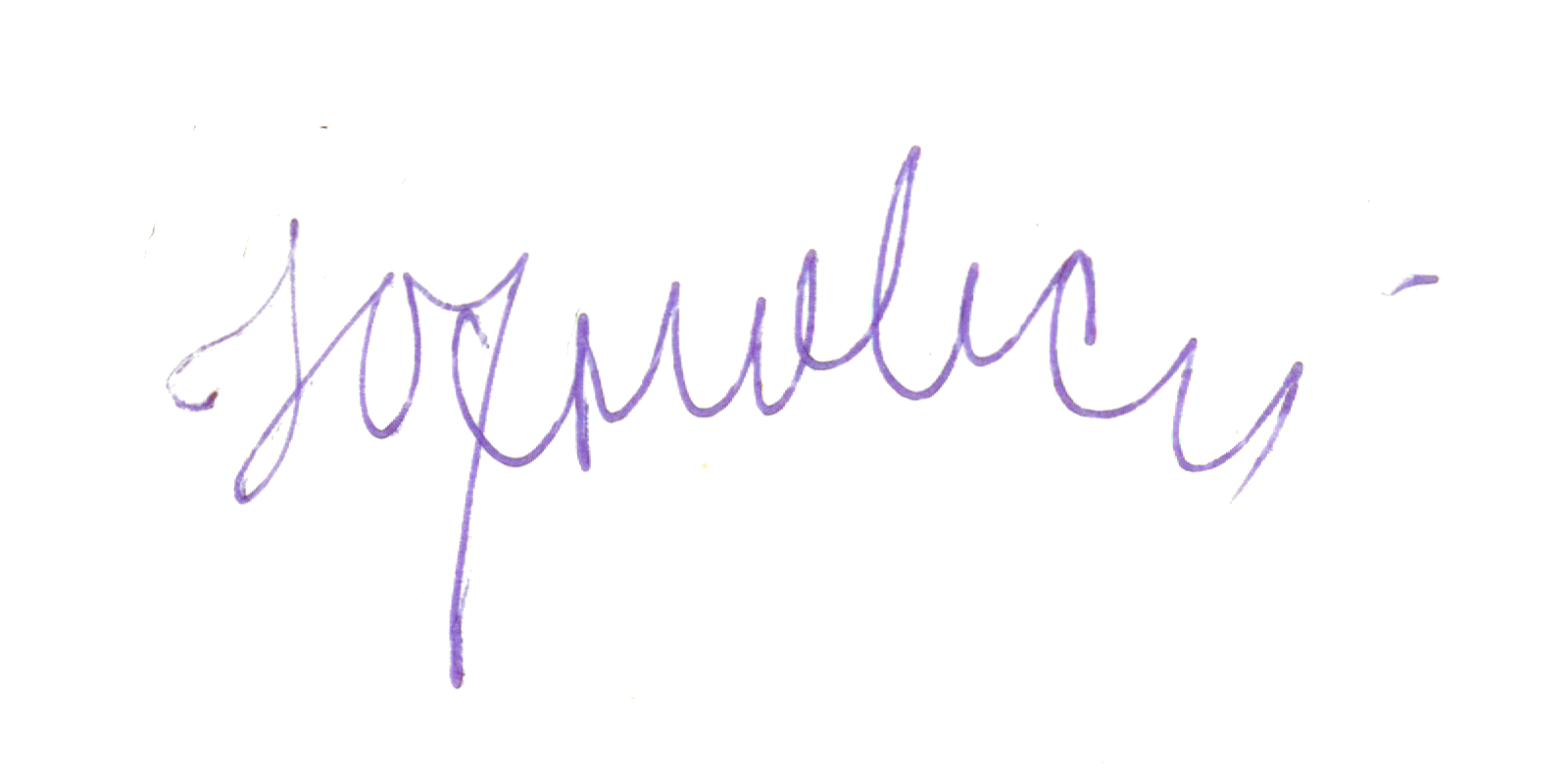
- Signature

Ihor Rafailovych Yukhnovskyi (Ukrainian: Iгор Рафаïлович Юхновський; also Yukhnovsky; 1 September 1925 – 26 March 2024) was a Ukrainian physicist and politician, and a member of the Presidium of Academy of Sciences of Ukraine, Hero of Ukraine.

== Life before politics ==
Yukhnovskyi was born on 1 September 1925, in Kniahynyne village, Dubno powiat, Wołyń Voivodeship (Poland). In 1944–1945 he participated in World War II on the side of Red Army. In 1951 he became the head of Theoretical Physics Department at Lviv University. In 1969 Yukhnovskyi, at that time Doctor of Physics and Mathematics led the newly organized Department of Statistical Theory of Condensed Matter. In 1980 the department was reorganized into the Lviv division of statistical physics for the Institute for Theoretical Physics, and then in 1990 into the Institute of Condensed Matter Physics of the National Academy of Sciences of Ukraine.

== Political life ==
On 30 March 1990, Yukhnovskyi was elected with 59.07% votes (out of 6 candidates) as a member of parliament of Ukrainian SSR from an election district in the city of Lviv. On 15 May 1990, he became the leader of the first ever opposition party in the Ukrainian SSR parliament named Narodna Rada (People’s Council). Yukhnovskyi was one of the co-authors of the Declaration of State Sovereignty of Ukraine.

During the 24 August 1991 parliamentary debate preceding the Declaration of Independence of Ukraine Yukhnovskyi was the MP who first called on parliament to immediately declare Ukraine an independent democratic state.

In the first presidential elections in Ukraine Yukhnovskyi was supported by 554,719 voters (1.74%) and took 5th place out of 6 candidates. In 1992 he was appointed the first vice Prime Minister of Ukraine.

In the 1994 parliamentary elections Yukhnovskyi was elected to the parliament in the same electoral district as in 1990, the city of Lviv, with 60.41% of support. In the 1998 parliamentary elections he was elected as #15 in the People's Movement of Ukraine (Rukh) party list. In the 2002 parliamentary elections he was again elected as #68 now in the Our Ukraine party list.

Yukhnovsky was an author of over 400 scientific papers, five books and a textbook "Osnovy kvantovoyi mekhaniky" (Fundamentals of Quantum Mechanics). As a member of the parliament he actively participated in passing of over 100 bills. He was one of the authors of the Act of Declaration of Independence of Ukraine.

Ihor Yukhnovskyi was the head of All-Ukrainian Union of World War II veterans. He supported the reconciliation of veterans of the Soviet Army and the Ukrainian Insurgent Army.

In 2006, Ukrainian President Viktor Yushchenko appointed Ihor Yukhnovskyi director of the Ukrainian Institute of National Memory.

Yukhnovskyi died in Lviv on 26 March 2024, at the age of 98.

== Commemoration and legacy ==
On Yukhnovskyi's 101st birthday in 2026, one of the streets of Lviv was renamed in his honour, and a square with a memorial stele dedicated to the academician was unveiled in presence of the city's mayor Andriy Sadovyi, Yukhnovsyki's daughter Natalia Hurska and human rights activist Myroslav Marynovych.

== Awards and honours ==
- Order of Liberty (Ukraine, 2016)
- Hero of Ukraine, 2005
