= Declaration of Independence of Ukraine =

1991 act declaring independence from the USSR

Act of Declaration of Independence of Ukraine
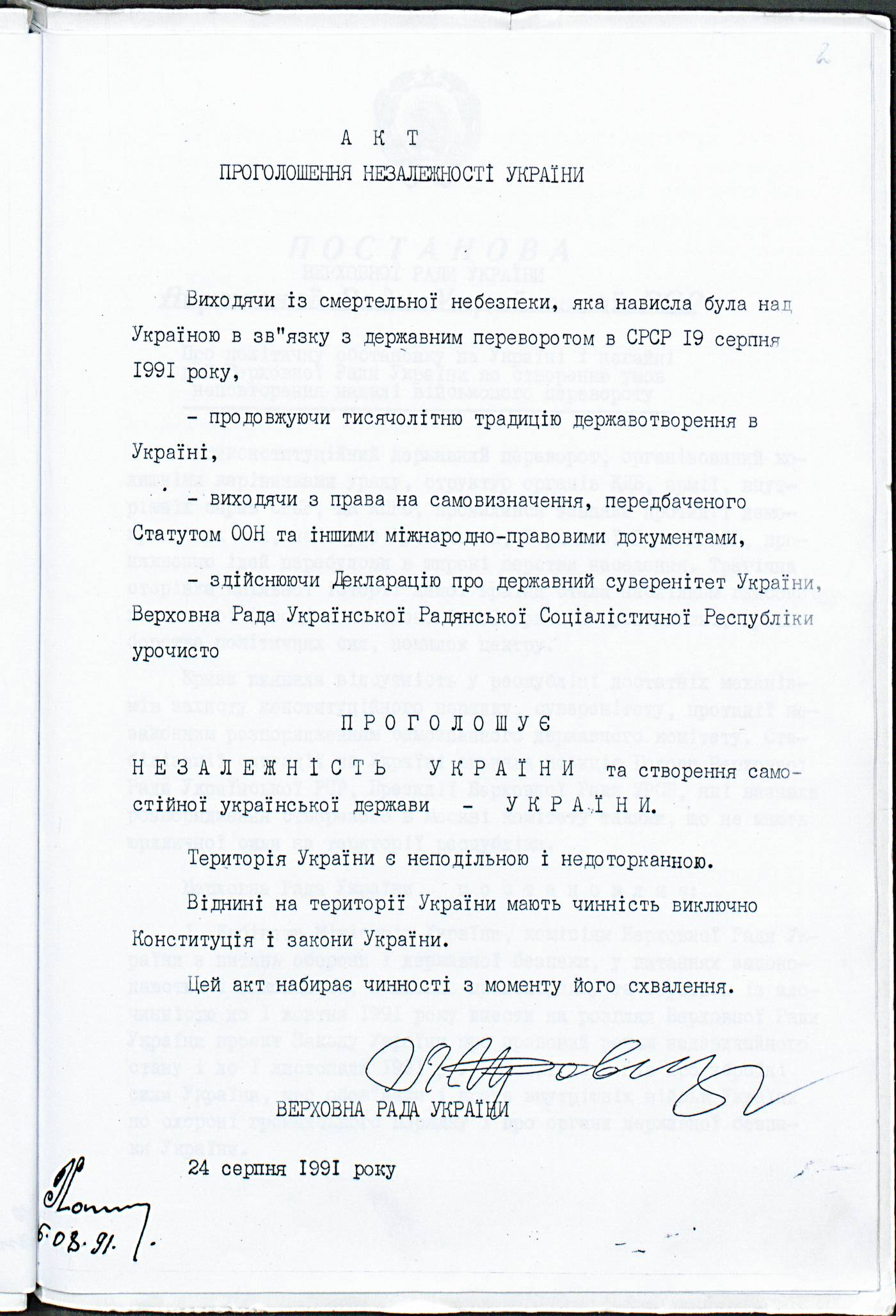
- Typewritten version of the act
- Original title: Акт проголошення незалежності України
- Created: 24 August 1991
- Ratified: 24 August 1991
- Location: Central State Archive of the higher governing bodies of Ukraine, Kyiv
- Author: Levko Lukianenko
- Signatories: Leonid Kravchuk
- Purpose: Declaration of independence

Full text
- Act of Declaration of Independence of Ukraine at Wikisource

The Act of Declaration of Independence of Ukraine (Note: Ukrainian: Акт проголошення незалежності України, romanized: Akt prohološennia nezaležnosti Ukrainy, pronounced [ˈɑkt proɦoˈlɔʃenʲːɐ nezɐˈlɛʒnos⁽ʲ⁾t⁽ʲ⁾i ʊkrɐˈjinɪ]) was adopted by the Supreme Soviet of the Ukrainian SSR (Verkhovna Rada) on 24 August 1991.

The Act reestablished Ukraine's state independence from the Soviet Union. The declaration was affirmed by a majority of Ukrainians in all regions of Ukraine by an independence referendum on 1 December, followed by international recognition starting on the following day. Ukrainian independence led to the dissolution of the Soviet Union by 26 December 1991.

== Adoption ==
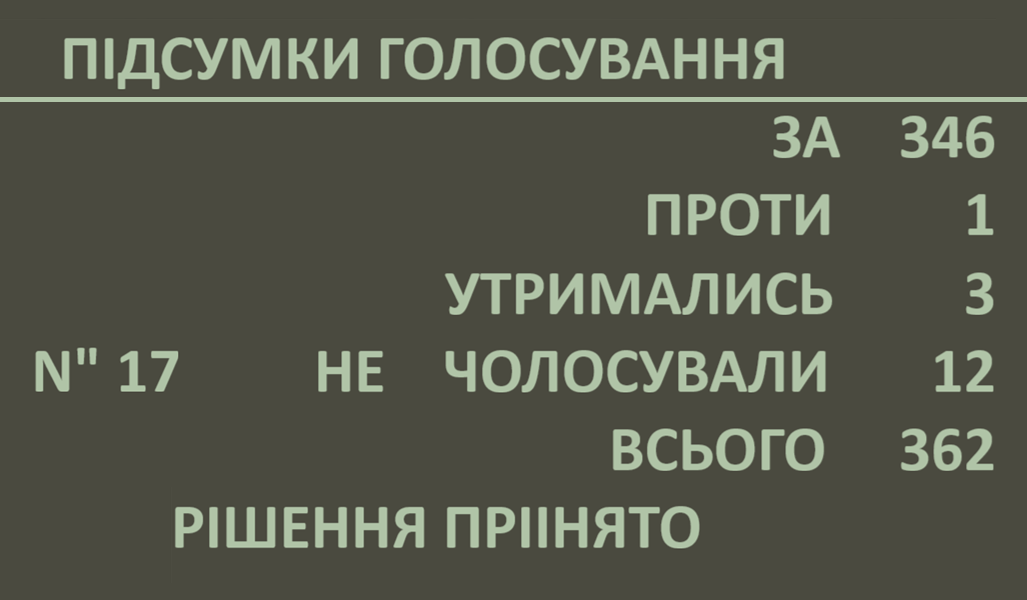
Voting results on adopting the Act of Declaration of Independence of Ukraine: "FOR 346 AGAINST 1 ABSTAINED 3 DID NOT VOTE 12 TOTAL 362 RESOLUTION ADOPTED."

The Act was adopted in the aftermath of the coup attempt in the Soviet Union on 19 August, when hardline Communist leaders attempted to restore central Communist party control over the USSR. The text was largely composed during the night of 23 August–24 August mainly by Levko Lukianenko, Serhiy Holovatyi, Mykhailo Horyn, Ivan Zayets and Vyacheslav Chornovil.

During a tense 11-hour extraordinary session on Saturday 24 August 1991, the Supreme Soviet or Verkhovna Rada, the parliament of the Ukrainian SSR, debated whether and how to declare the independence of Ukraine and other related urgent matters. First, a preliminary vote was held at 17:57 o'clock, mostly at the urging of the communist majority in the Rada, who demanded that any declaration of independence would be confirmed by a popular referendum; otherwise, they claimed, the Declaration might not represent "the will of the people". Thus, the compromise proposal to hold a vote to adopt the Act of Declaration of Independence together with holding a confirmatory referendum if the Act would be approved, passed with 321 votes in favor, 2 votes against, and 6 abstentions (out of 360 attendants). This indicated that the communists would almost certainly support the Act; the Rada spontaneously burst into cheering, applause and a standing ovation when the results were announced. When the enthusiasm had calmed down, Kravchuk proceeded to hold the vote on the Act of Declaration of Independence of Ukraine itself, which was overwhelmingly approved at 18:00 o'clock with 346 votes in favour, 1 against, 3 abstentions, and 12 deputies who did not vote (out of 362 attendants).

The Communist Party of Ukraine (CPU), with the campaigning behind the scenes by its fellow Party member and Ukrainian Supreme Soviet Chairman Leonid Kravchuk, felt compelled to support the Act in order to distance itself from the coup. CPU First Secretary Stanislav Hurenko argued that "it will be a disaster" if the CPU were to fail to support independence. CPU members had been unnerved by the news of former Ukrainian SSR party leader Vladimir Ivashko's arrest in Moscow, the re-subordination of the Soviet Army under the leaders of the Russian SFSR and the sealing of the Soviet Communist Party Central Committee's premises.

People celebrate the declaration near the Verkhovna Rada building (24 August 1991)

The same day (24 August), the parliament called for a referendum on support for the Declaration of Independence. The proposal for calling the national referendum came jointly from opposition leaders Ihor Yukhnovsky and Dmytro Pavlychko. The Parliament also voted for the creation of a national guard of Ukraine and turned jurisdiction over all the armed forces located on Ukrainian territory over to itself.

Other than a noisy crowd that had gathered at the Parliament building, the streets of Kyiv were quiet that day, with few signs of open celebration.

The front page of the parliamentary newspaper Holos Ukrayiny with the text of the declaration printed on the lower half (27 August 1991)

In the days that followed, a number of resolutions and decrees were passed: nationalizing all CPU property and handing it over to the Supreme Soviet and local councils; issuing an amnesty for all political prisoners; suspending all CPU activities and freezing CPU assets and bank accounts pending official investigations into possible collaboration with the Moscow coup plotters; setting up a committee of inquiry into official behavior during the coup; and establishing a committee on military matters related to the creation of a Ministry of Defense of Ukraine.

On 26 August 1991, the Permanent Representative of the Ukrainian SSR to the United Nations (Soviet Ukraine being a founding member of the United Nations), Hennadiy Udovenko, informed the office of the Secretary General of the United Nations that his permanent mission to this international assembly would officially be designated as representing Ukraine. That same day, the executive committee of Kyiv also voted to remove all the monuments of Communist heroes from public places, including the Lenin monument in the central October Revolution Square. The committee decided that the large square would be renamed Maidan Nezalezhnosti (Independence Square) as would the central Metro station below it.

Two days later, more than 200,000 Lviv and Lviv oblast residents declared their readiness to serve in the national guard.

In the independence referendum on 1 December 1991, the people of Ukraine expressed deep and widespread support for the Act of Declaration of Independence, with more than 90% voting in favor, and 84% of the electorate participating. The referendum took place on the same day as Ukraine's first direct presidential election; all six presidential candidates supported independence and campaigned for a "yes" vote. The referendum's passage ended any realistic chance of the Soviet Union remaining together even on a limited scale; Ukraine had long been second only to Russia in economic and political power in the USSR.

A week after the election, newly elected president Leonid Kravchuk joined his Russian and Belarusian counterparts (Boris Yeltsin and Stanislav Shushkevich, respectively) in signing the Belovezh Accords, which declared that the Soviet Union had ceased to exist. The Soviet Union officially dissolved on 26 December.

Since 1992, the 24th of August is celebrated in Ukraine as Independence Day.

== International recognition ==
Poland and Canada were the first countries to recognize Ukraine's independence, both on 2 December 1991. On the same day (2 December) it was reported during the late-evening airing of the television news program Vesti that the President of the Russian SFSR, Boris Yeltsin, had recognized Ukraine's independence.

The United States did so on 25 December 1991. That month the independence of Ukraine was recognized by 68 states, and in 1992 it was recognized by another 64 states.

In January 1992, U.S. President George H. W. Bush approved a program of American humanitarian support for Ukraine and the rest of the former USSR, supervised by the Secretary of Defense.

By the end of 1991 there was widespread international recognition.

A chronology of international recognition of the independence of Ukraine
Date	Country
2 December 1991	Poland
2 December 1991	Canada
2 December 1991	Russia (Note: De facto constituent republic of the Soviet Union until 12 December 1991, when the Belovezh Accords were ratified by the Russian parliament, de jure until 26 December, when the Supreme Soviet dissolved the USSR. Recognition of Ukraine's independence by Russia was announced on 2 December by President Boris Yeltsin during that day's edition of the late-evening news program Vesti)
3 December 1991	Hungary
4 December 1991	Latvia
4 December 1991	Lithuania
5 December 1991	Argentina
5 December 1991	Croatia (Note: De facto independent, but de jure constituent republic of SFR Yugoslavia until 15 January 1992.)
5 December 1991	Cuba
5 December 1991	Czechoslovakia
9 December 1991	Estonia
10 December 1991	Belarus (Note: De facto independent, but de jure constituent republic of the Soviet Union until 26 December 1991.) (Note: The Belovezh Accords were ratified by the Belarusian parliament on this date. Formal diplomatic relations established on 27 December 1991.)
11 December 1991	Slovenia
12 December 1991	Georgia
16 December 1991	Bulgaria
16 December 1991	Turkey
18 December 1991	Armenia
19 December 1991	Sweden
20 December 1991	Kyrgyzstan
20 December 1991	Turkmenistan
23 December 1991	Kazakhstan
23 December 1991	Switzerland
24 December 1991	(Democratic Republic of Afghanistan) Afghanistan
24 December 1991	Norway
25 December 1991	Iran
25 December 1991	Israel
25 December 1991	Mexico
25 December 1991	Tajikistan
25 December 1991	United States
25 December 1991	(Socialist Federal Republic of Yugoslavia) Yugoslavia
26 December 1991	Australia
26 December 1991	Brazil
26 December 1991	Germany
26 December 1991	India
26 December 1991	New Zealand
26 December 1991	Peru
26 December 1991	Soviet Union (Note: The USSR self-dissolved, recognizing the independence of each of its former constituent republics aside from the Baltic republics, whose independence was recognized back in September 1991.)
26 December 1991	Syria
26 December 1991	Thailand
26 December 1991	Uruguay
27 December 1991	Algeria
27 December 1991	Kampuchea
27 December 1991	China
27 December 1991	Cyprus
27 December 1991	France
27 December 1991	Moldova
27 December 1991	Vietnam
28 December 1991	Indonesia
28 December 1991	Italy
28 December 1991	Japan
28 December 1991	Jordan
29 December 1991	Bangladesh
30 December 1991	Finland
30 December 1991	South Korea
30 December 1991	Lebanon
30 December 1991	Morocco
31 December 1991	Belgium
31 December 1991	Denmark
31 December 1991	Greece
31 December 1991	Luxembourg
31 December 1991	Netherlands
31 December 1991	Pakistan
31 December 1991	Spain
31 December 1991	United Kingdom
1 January 1992	Iraq
2 January 1992	Ethiopia
2 January 1992	Laos
2 January 1992	United Arab Emirates
3 January 1992	Egypt
3 January 1992	(History of Libya under Muammar Gaddafi) Libya
3 January 1992	Panama
4 January 1992	Uzbekistan
5 January 1992	Bahrain
7 January 1992	Portugal
8 January 1992	Romania
10 January 1992	Guinea
15 January 1992	Austria (Note: Consular relations were established on September 26, 1991; the General Consulate opened on December 1, 1991.)
17 January 1992	(Mongolian People's Republic) Mongolia
22 January 1992	Philippines
24 January 1992	Nepal
6 February 1992	Azerbaijan
11 February 1992	Botswana
14 February 1992	South Africa
3 March 1992	Malaysia
4 March 1992	Madagascar
7 May 1992	Rwanda
2 June 1992	Senegal
8 June 1992	Tanzania
23 July 1993	Macedonia

== Text ==
Act of Declaration of Independence of Ukraine

- In view of the mortal danger surrounding Ukraine in connection with the state coup in the USSR on 19 August 1991,
- Continuing the thousand-year tradition of state development in Ukraine,
- Proceeding from the right of a nation to self-determination in accordance with the Charter of the United Nations and other international legal documents, and
- Implementing the Declaration of State Sovereignty of Ukraine,

the Verkhovna Rada of the Ukrainian Soviet Socialist Republic solemnly declares
the Independence of Ukraine and the creation of an independent Ukrainian state – UKRAINE.

The territory of Ukraine is indivisible and inviolable.

From this day forward, only the Constitution and laws of Ukraine are valid on the territory of Ukraine.

This act becomes effective at the moment of its approval.

— Verkhovna Rada of Ukraine, 24 August 1991
