= Bolshetroitskoye =

Bolshetroitskoye Большетроицкое
- Selo
- Location within Belgorod Oblast Location within Russia
- Coordinates: 50°32′N 37°17′E
- Country: Russia
- Region: Belgorod Oblast
- District: Shebekinsky District
- Time zone: UTC+3:00

Bolshetroitskoye (Russian: Большетроицкое) is a rural locality (a selo) and the administrative center of Bolshetroitskoye Rural Settlement, Shebekinsky District, Belgorod Oblast, Russia. The population was 2,250 as of 2010. There are 27 streets.

== Geography ==
Bolshetroitskoye is located 42 km northeast of Shebekino (the district's administrative centre) by road. Chervona Dibrovka is the nearest rural locality.
