= Stanislav Hurenko =

Soviet and Ukrainian politician (1936–2013)

- Станіслав Гуренко
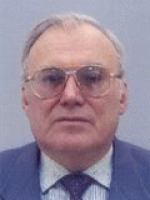
- Official portrait, 2002

People's Deputy of Ukraine
- In office 12 May 1998 – 25 May 2006
- Constituency: Communist Party of Ukraine, No. 25 (1998–2002); Communist Party of Ukraine, No. 7 (2002–2006)
- In office 15 May 1990 – 25 January 1993
- Preceded by: Position established
- Succeeded by: Vasyl Androshchuk
- Constituency: Kyiv Oblast, No. 219

First Secretary of the Communist Party of Ukraine under the USSR
- In office 23 June 1990 – 30 August 1991
- Preceded by: Vladimir Ivashko
- Succeeded by: Position abolished (Petro Symonenko as First Secretary of the CPU in Independent Ukraine)

Full member of the 28th Politburo
- In office 14 July 1990 – 29 August 1991

Personal details
- Born: 30 May 1936 Ilovaisk, Donetsk Oblast, Ukrainian SSR, Soviet Union (now Ukraine)
- Died: 14 April 2013 (aged 76) Kyiv, Ukraine
- Party: Communist Party of the Soviet Union (until 1991); Communist Party of Ukraine (after 1991)
- Spouse: Liudmyla
- Children: Ivan and Kseniia
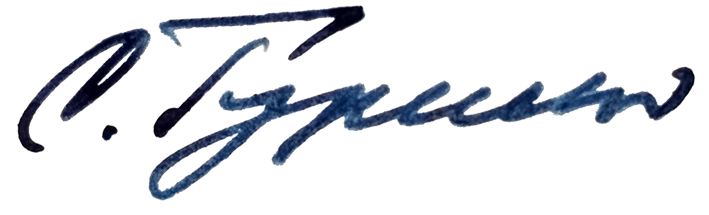
- Signature

Stanislav Ivanovych Hurenko (Ukrainian: Станіслав Іванович Гуренко; Russian: Станислав Иванович Гуренко, romanized: Stanislav Ivanovich Gurenko; 30 May 1936 – 14 April 2013) was a Soviet and Ukrainian politician. He was a member of the Communist Party of the Soviet Union.

== Biography ==
Mikhail Gorbachev brought in his ally Hurenko in to replace Vladimir Ivashko as First Secretary of the Ukrainian Communist Party on 23 June 1990. He resigned his position as First Secretary on 30 August 1991, when the failure of the August coup in Moscow, the activities of the Communist Party of Ukraine were banned.

Then he served as the member of Verkhovna Rada.

Hurenko retired and died on 14 April 2013, at the age of 76 after suffering from cancer.

Party political offices
| Preceded by Volodymyr Ivashko | Second Secretary the Communist Party of Ukraine; 1989–1990 | Succeeded by Leonid Kravchuk |
| Preceded by Vladimir Ivashko | First Secretary the Communist Party of Ukraine; 23 Jun 1990 – 30 Aug 1991 | Succeeded by none (Position abolished) |
