= 1991 Ukrainian independence referendum =

- 1 December 1991
- Do you support the Act of Declaration of Independence of Ukraine?
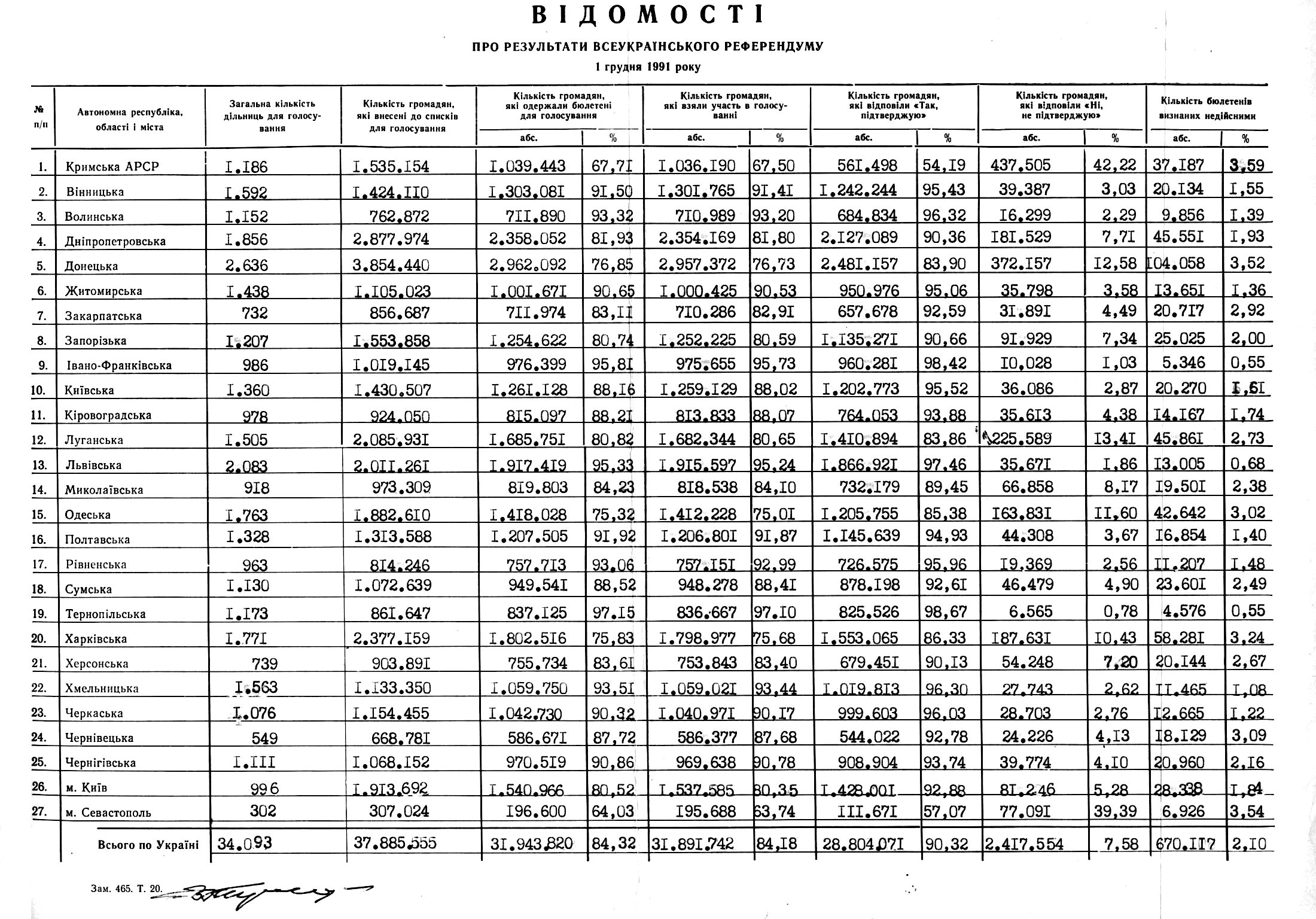
- The result of the referendum in a bulletin.

Results
Choice	Votes	%
Yes	28,804,071	92.26%
No	2,417,554	7.74%
Valid votes	31,221,625	97.90%
Invalid or blank votes	670,117	2.10%
Total votes	31,891,742	100.00%
Registered voters/turnout	37,885,555	84.18%
Results by region
Yes:
50–60%
80–85%
85–90%
90–95%
95–100%

A referendum on the Act of Declaration of Independence was held in Ukraine on 1 December 1991. An overwhelming majority of 92% of voters approved the declaration of independence made by the Verkhovna Rada on 24 August 1991. The public vote was held in response to the failed August coup and the New Union Treaty not being signed.

Voters were asked "Do you confirm the Act of Declaration of Independence of Ukraine?" The text of the Declaration was included as a preamble to the question. The referendum was called by the Parliament of Ukraine to confirm the Act of Independence, which was adopted by the Parliament on 24 August 1991. Citizens of Ukraine expressed overwhelming support for independence. In the referendum, 31,891,742 registered voters (or 84.18% of the electorate) took part, and among them 28,804,071 (or 92.3%) voted "Yes".

On the same day, a presidential election took place. In the month up to the presidential election, all six candidates campaigned across Ukraine in favour of independence from the Soviet Union, and a "Yes" vote in the referendum. Leonid Kravchuk, the parliament chairman and de facto head of state, was elected to serve as the first President of Ukraine.

From 2 December 1991 onwards, Ukraine was globally recognized by other countries as an independent state. Also on 2 December, the President of the Russian SFSR Boris Yeltsin recognized Ukraine as independent. In a telegram of congratulations Soviet President Mikhail Gorbachev sent to Kravchuk soon after the referendum, Gorbachev included his hopes for close Ukrainian cooperation and understanding in "the formation of a union of sovereign states".

Ukraine was the second-most powerful republic in the Soviet Union both economically and politically (behind Russia), and its secession ended any realistic chance of Gorbachev keeping the USSR together. By December 1991 all former Soviet Republics except the RSFSR and the Kazakh SSR had formally seceded from the Union. A week after his election, Kravchuk joined with Yeltsin and Belarusian leader Stanislav Shushkevich in signing the Belavezha Accords, which declared that the Soviet Union had ceased to exist. The USSR officially dissolved on 26 December.

== Results ==
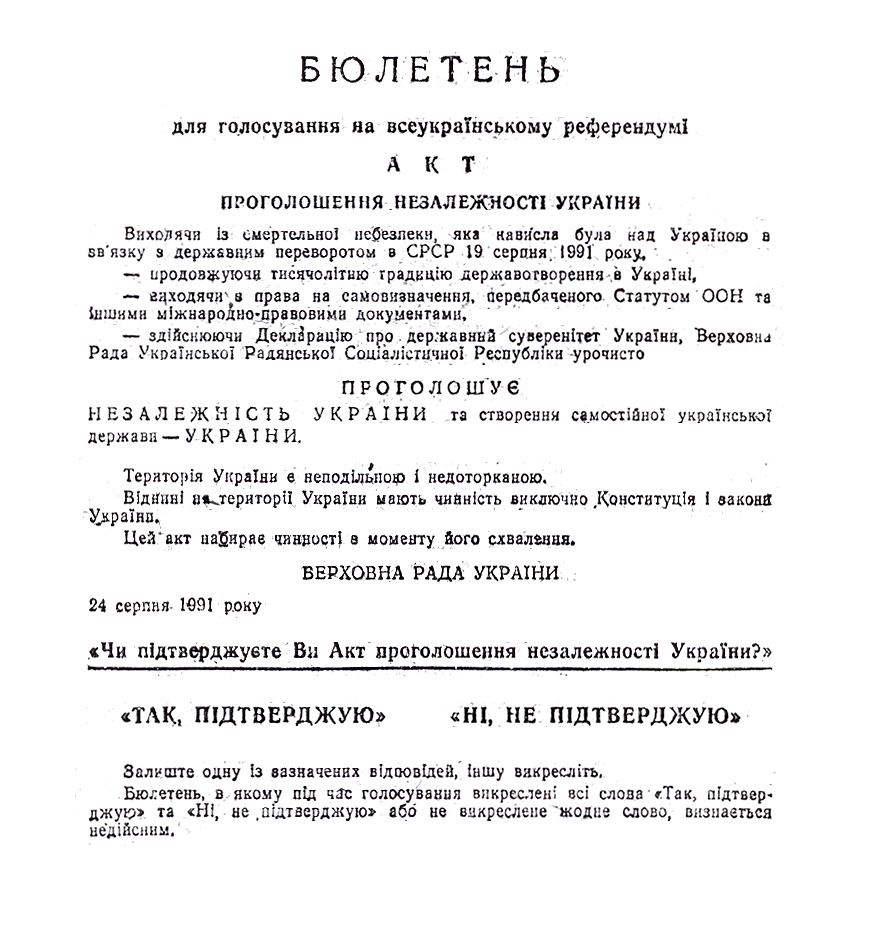
The ballot paper used in the referendum, with the text of the Declaration of Independence printed on it.

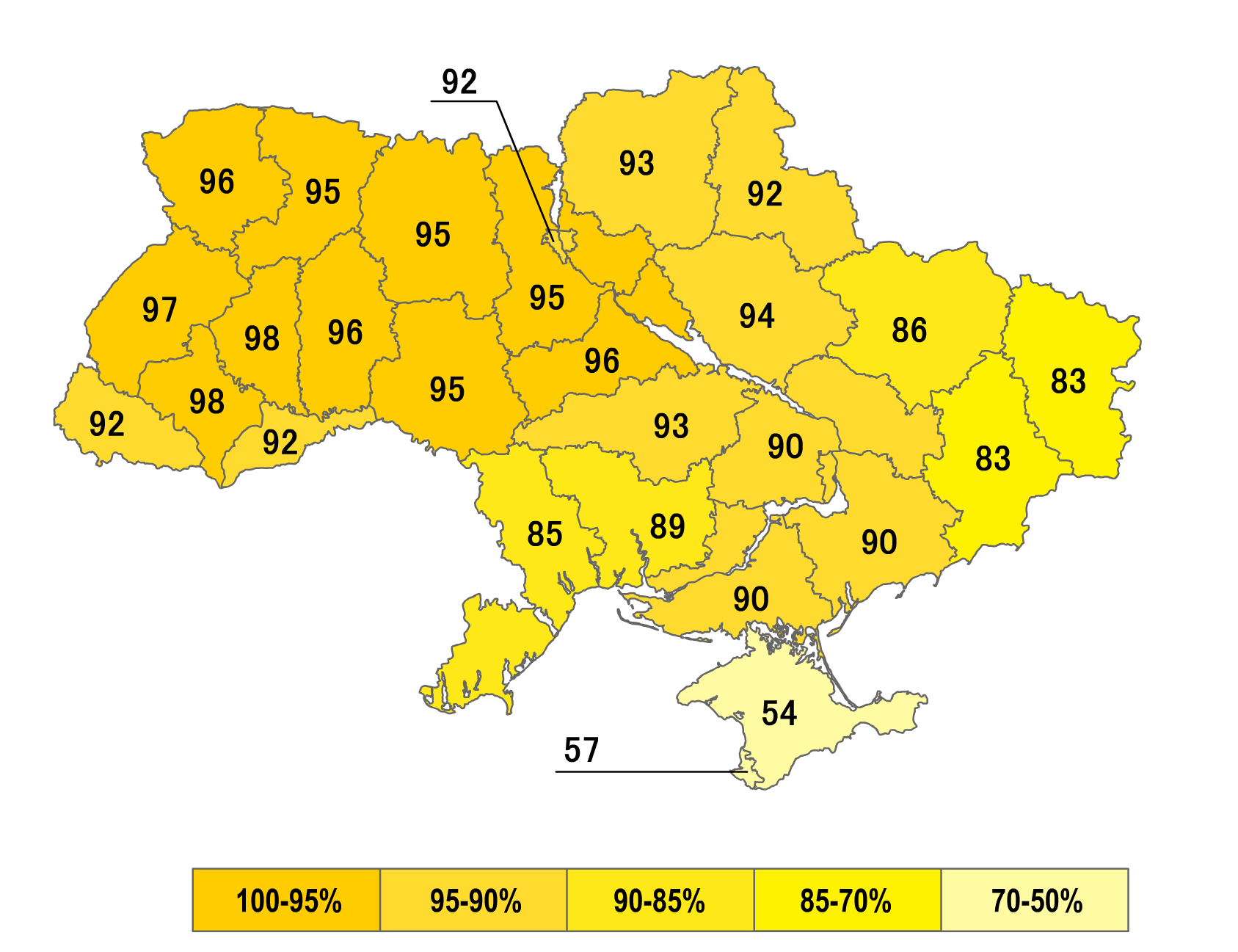
Yes-vote in % per Ukrainian Oblast

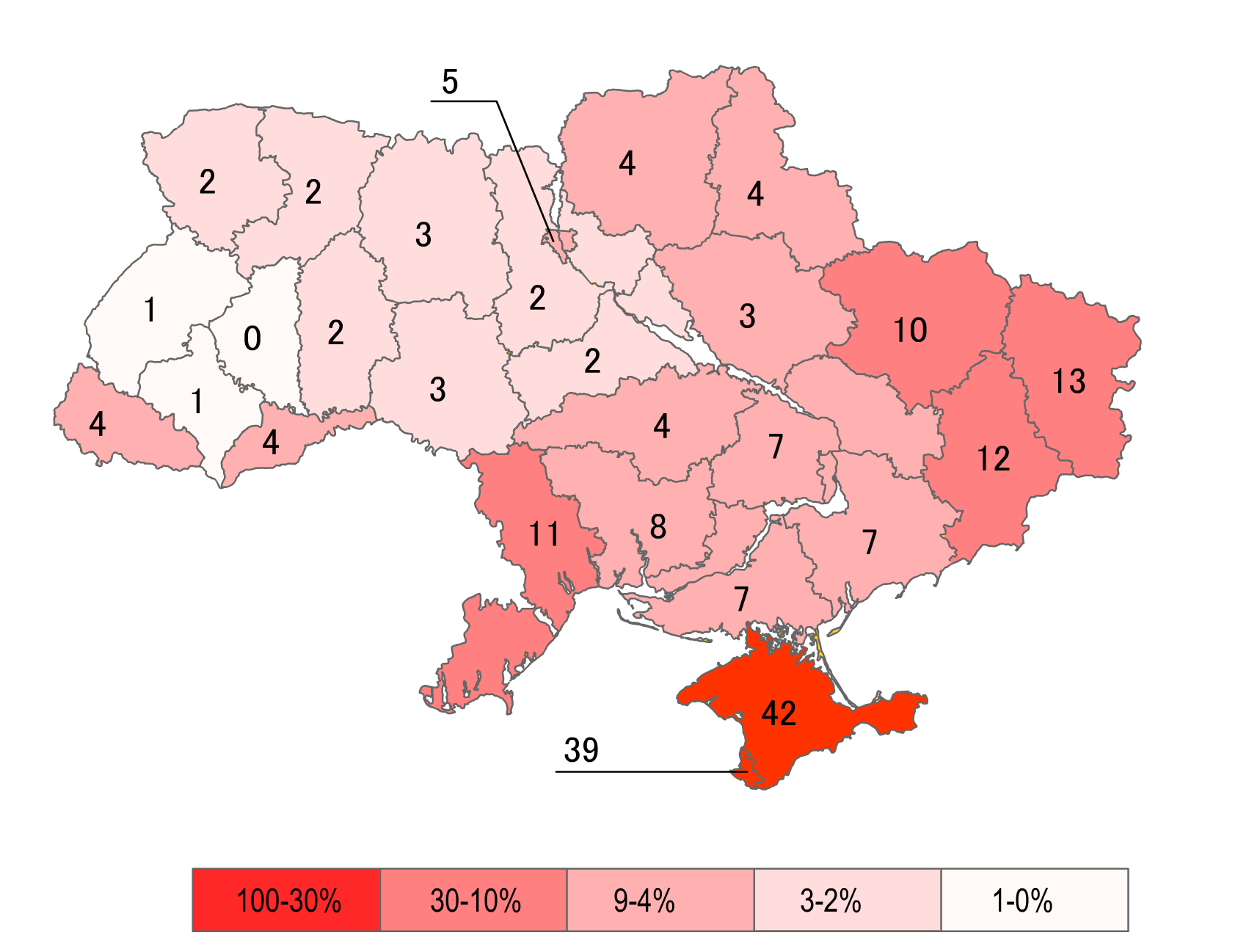
No-vote in % per Ukrainian Oblast

Ukrainian media had converted en masse to the independence ideal.

Polls showed 63% support for the "Yes" campaign in September 1991; that grew to 77% in the first week of October 1991 and 88% by mid-November 1991.

55% of the ethnic Russians in Ukraine voted for independence.

Choice	Votes	%
For	28,804,071	92.26
Against	2,417,554	7.74
Total	31,221,625	100.00
Valid votes	31,221,625	97.90
Invalid/blank votes	670,117	2.10
Total votes	31,891,742	100.00
Registered voters/turnout	37,885,555	84.18
Source: Nohlen & Stöver

=== By region ===
The Act of Independence was supported by a majority of participating voters in each of the 27 administrative regions of Ukraine: 24 oblasts, 1 autonomous republic, and 2 special municipalities (Kyiv City and Sevastopol City). Voter turnout was lowest in Eastern and Southern Ukraine. The six regions with the lowest percentage of "yes" votes were Kharkiv, Luhansk, Donetsk, and Odesa Oblasts, Crimea, and Sevastopol; all of those regions still had a majority of registered voters marking their ballots "yes", except for Crimea and Sevastopol.

Subdivision	Percentage voting for independence	
Subdivision	Of votes cast	Of electorate
Cherkasy Oblast	96.03	87
Chernihiv Oblast	93.74	85
Chernivtsi Oblast	92.78	81
Dnipropetrovsk Oblast	90.36	74
Donetsk Oblast	83.90	64
Ivano-Frankivsk Oblast	98.42	94
Kharkiv Oblast	86.33	65
Kherson Oblast	90.13	75
Khmelnytskyi Oblast	96.30	90
Kirovohrad Oblast	93.88	83
Kyiv Oblast	95.52	84
Luhansk Oblast	83.86	68
Lviv Oblast	97.46	93
Mykolayiv Oblast	89.45	75
Odesa Oblast	85.38	64
Poltava Oblast	94.93	87
Rivne Oblast	95.96	89
Sumy Oblast	92.61	82
Ternopil Oblast	98.67	96
Transcarpathia Oblast	92.59	77
Vinnytsia Oblast	95.43	87
Volyn Oblast	96.32	90
Zaporizhzhia Oblast	90.66	73
Zhytomyr Oblast	95.06	86
Crimean ASSR	54.19	37
Kyiv City	92.87	75
Sevastopol City	57.07	36
National total	90.32	76

== Reactions ==
=== Preliminary results ===
Although counting was ongoing throughout the night, by 2 December afternoon, exitpolls and early results were already indicating about a 75% lead in favour of independence, according to both electoral officials and leaders of the pro-independence People's Movement of Ukraine (Rukh). Preliminary results published by the Central Election Commission of Ukraine even indicated about 85% support for "Yes". Later that day, in his role as President of the Verkhovna Rada, Kravchuk announced that about 90% of the Ukrainian population had chosen an independent state. Shortly thereafter, preliminary results also indicated that Kravchuk had won the presidential election, although with a smaller majority of about 60%. His main opponent Chornovil had scored above 25%, especially in Western Ukraine (77% in Lviv Oblast, his home region), more than the 15% which opinion polls had predicted he would receive. Commentators suggested that this would compel Kravchuk to take the demands of Chornovil's supporters and Rukh's platform of a clean political and economic break from the Soviet Union more seriously than the more moderate approach Kravchuk himself had campaigned for.

=== Gorbachev, Kravchuk and Yeltsin ===
Ahead of the vote, Mikhail Gorbachev frequently argued that Ukraine leaving the Soviet Union without signing the New Union Treaty and joining his envisioned Union of Sovereign States would be a disaster for the whole country, for Europe and the whole world. In TASS, he spoke of 'self-determination with the union', and that 'a breakup would cost us dearly' and 'spill over in into territorial disputes'. However, in a later phone call to U.S. president Bush sr., Gorbachev argued that he would not view Ukraine voting for independence as necessarily breaking away from the (new) union.

In response to the preliminary results announced in the latter half of 2 December, Kravchuk (now the likely President-elect of Ukraine) repeated his earlier statement that he would not sign Gorbachev's New Union Treaty; he no longer trusted such vertical partnerships, only horizontal partnerships 'like the European Community'.

Ukraine has become an independent state. That means that the process to form a new union has come to an end.

— Leonid Kravchuk, 2 December 1991

While Gorbachev's spokesperson suggested on 2 December that Ukraine's new-found independence might make it even easier to join a renewed union, and Gorbachev was one of the first to congratulate Kravchuk on winning the presidential election that same day, in the morning of 3 December, he warned that the secession of Ukraine might lead to war and "a catastrophe for the world".

Boris Yeltsin, who was still negotiating with Gorbachev and other Soviet leaders about the New Union Treaty, indicated before the referendum that he could not envision a new union without Ukraine. He said repeatedly it would be regrettable if Ukraine quit the union, but in an interview in Izvestiya in the week before the referendum, Yeltsin announced that if it did, Russia would not sign the New Union Treaty either. If Ukraine would also reject any economic agreements with the other (post-)Soviet republics, as advocated by Chornovil, Yeltsin stated he would henceforth calculate oil and gas deliveries to Ukraine in U.S. dollars instead of the cheaper Soviet ruble as a countermeasure. Unlike Chornovil, Kravchuk still found it important to conclude an economic agreement (perhaps similar to the European Community) with the other (post-)Soviet republics, particularly Russia and Belarus, as long as it was headquartered in Kyiv or Minsk, not in Moscow. Vermont-based Russian nationalist writer Aleksandr Solzhenitsyn was advocating for partitioning Ukraine along voting lines, saying districts with a majority of "No" voters (presumably with a Russian-speaking majority) should be transferred to the Russian Federation instead. This idea lost realistic credibility as soon as it became clear that the majority of all oblasts, including with Russian-speaking majorities in some cities, had voted overwhelmingly in favour of independence, even with a slight majority in Crimea. Yeltsin immediately recognised Ukraine's independence in a statement on 2 December 1991, saying he was going to seek out how Russia could establish diplomatic ties with Ukraine as soon as possible.

=== Europe and North America ===
Most individual countries in Europe and around the world were quick to respond positively to the preliminary results of the referendum, with Poland and Canada immediately recognising Ukraine's independence diplomatically, and Sweden and Czechoslovakia announcing that they were planning to. For their part, the Foreign Ministers of the European Community, who were gathered in Brussels on 2 December, called on Ukraine to continue to abide by all OSCE obligations which the Soviet Union had previously committed to, including arms control, non-proliferation, and foreign debt. If the Ukrainian government could clarify its future policies, recognition could be discussed, the European Community stated. Bush sr. congratulated Kravchuk with his victory, as well as the "free and fair" manner in which the referendum was held. He would send his assistant Thomas M. T. Niles to establish diplomatic ties with Ukraine, and discuss with the Ukrainian government how to handle human rights, minority rights, and Ukraine's responsibility in conventional and nuclear arms control. Similar to Europe's cautious approach, America's attitude towards Ukrainian independence was to first clarify Kyiv's policies in these domains before Washington could proceed to diplomatic recognition.

=== Public opinion ===
On referendum day, a journalist of De Volkskrant could not find anyone in Kyiv ("apart from one Russian soldier") who was opposed to Ukrainian independence: "Young and old, Russian, Ukrainian, Jew, they wholeheartedly agree with the idea that Ukraine secedes from the Union, and liberates itself from Moscow's urge to boss people about." Unlike in the three Baltic republics, where independence was framed as a national struggle and achieving it was hailed with euphoria, national pride was a secondary motivation for Ukrainian independence, with most people citing economic arguments as their primary reasons for voting "Yes". There were no large-scale celebrations, but people found that they were making the rational choice under the circumstances, and were glad that it was done. Above all, they favoured good, normal, and equal relations with Russia outside the Union, rather than paying Moscow and not receiving anything in return (not even Western food and medicine disaster relief for the Chornobyl disaster), and having to undergo the Russification of Ukraine and the suppression of the Ukrainian language for no good reason.

== Analysis ==
The political and especially economic consequences of Ukraine's secession are difficult to assess at this stage. But it is clear that the idea of a new confederation of Soviet republics, each with maximum sovereignty and held together by a virtually symbolic overarching centre, is hardly viable without the important Ukraine. In that sense, Sunday's referendum has drawn a line under the history of the Soviet Union.

— NRC Handelsblad (3 December 1991)

Some experts claim that the 1991 Ukrainian independence referendum was the most immediate event that led to the collapse of the Soviet Union. According to Brian D. Taylor, in the aftermath of the failed 1991 Soviet coup attempt, most of the Soviet republics adopted declarations of independence, the most important of which was that of Ukraine. By the end of September, eight republics had declared independence: Belarus, Moldova, Azerbaijan, Uzbekistan, Kyrgyzstan, Georgia, Tajikistan and Armenia. These declarations of independence were largely symbolic and did not mean withdrawal from the union. Negotiations on the union continued for several months, but in the end, in the 1991 Ukrainian independence referendum, more than 90 per cent of Ukrainians voted for independence. Almost all observers agreed that serious federal discussions were impossible without Ukraine's participation. On 6 December, shortly after Ukraine's independence referendum, the Supreme Soviet of Ukraine adopted a new military oath pledging loyalty to Ukraine. On 13 December, Leonid Kravchuk proclaimed himself Supreme Commander of the Armed Forces of Ukraine and declared that the Ukrainian Armed Forces would be formed from Soviet troops stationed in Ukraine.

According to Mark Kramer, Boris Yeltsin often expressed his willingness to accept the independence of the Baltic states and Georgia and Moldova, but wanted to preserve the Union. What deprived Yeltsin of this option was the surge of independence sentiment in Ukraine after the coup attempt. Following the successful independence referendum, Yeltsin's only way to preserve the Soviet Union would have been to use massive force against Ukraine. However, Yeltsin chose not to and instead recognised the dissolution of the Soviet Union, and joined the Belovezha Accords and the Alma-Ata Protocol.

According to Adrian Karatnycky, although Yeltsin thwarted the coup and brought down the Soviet Communist Party, it was Kravchuk and Ukraine that ultimately brought down the Soviet Union. Ukraine's rejection of Mikhail Gorbachev's Union Treaty led to the immediate collapse of the Soviet Union.

According to Peter J. Potichnyj, Yeltsin and Gorbachev consistently sabotaged Ukraine's independence. However, because the referendum was conducted in an open and democratic manner, it convinced Russia and world leaders that the Soviet system was no longer viable or sustainable.

According to Laura Blaj, the Ukrainian Communist Party rejected the Soviet reforms of Gorbachev and Yeltsin. This was a decisive factor in Ukraine's overwhelmingly positive vote. The Communist conservatives were allied with Ukrainian nationalists and the result of the Ukrainian referendum therefore led directly to the collapse of the Soviet Union.

== See also ==
- Dissolution of the Soviet Union
- 1991 Transcarpathian general regional referendum
- 2014 Donbas status referendums
- 2014 Crimean status referendum
- Russo-Ukrainian War (2014 – present)
