= Donetsk =

City in Donetsk Oblast, Ukraine

Donetsk Донецьк (Ukrainian) Донецк (Russian)
- City

Ukrainian transcription(s)
  - Romanization: Donetsk
  - Scholarly: Donećk
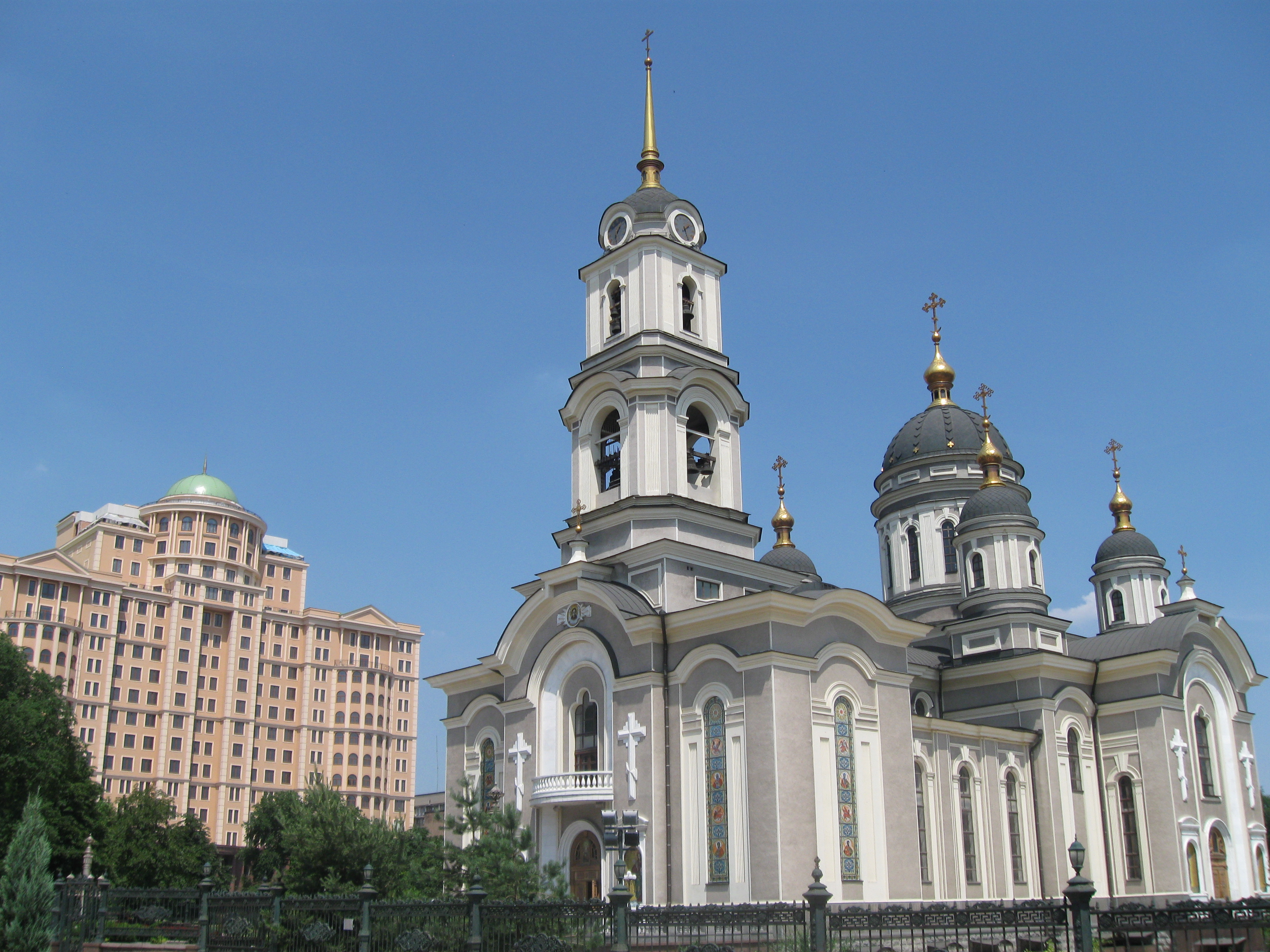
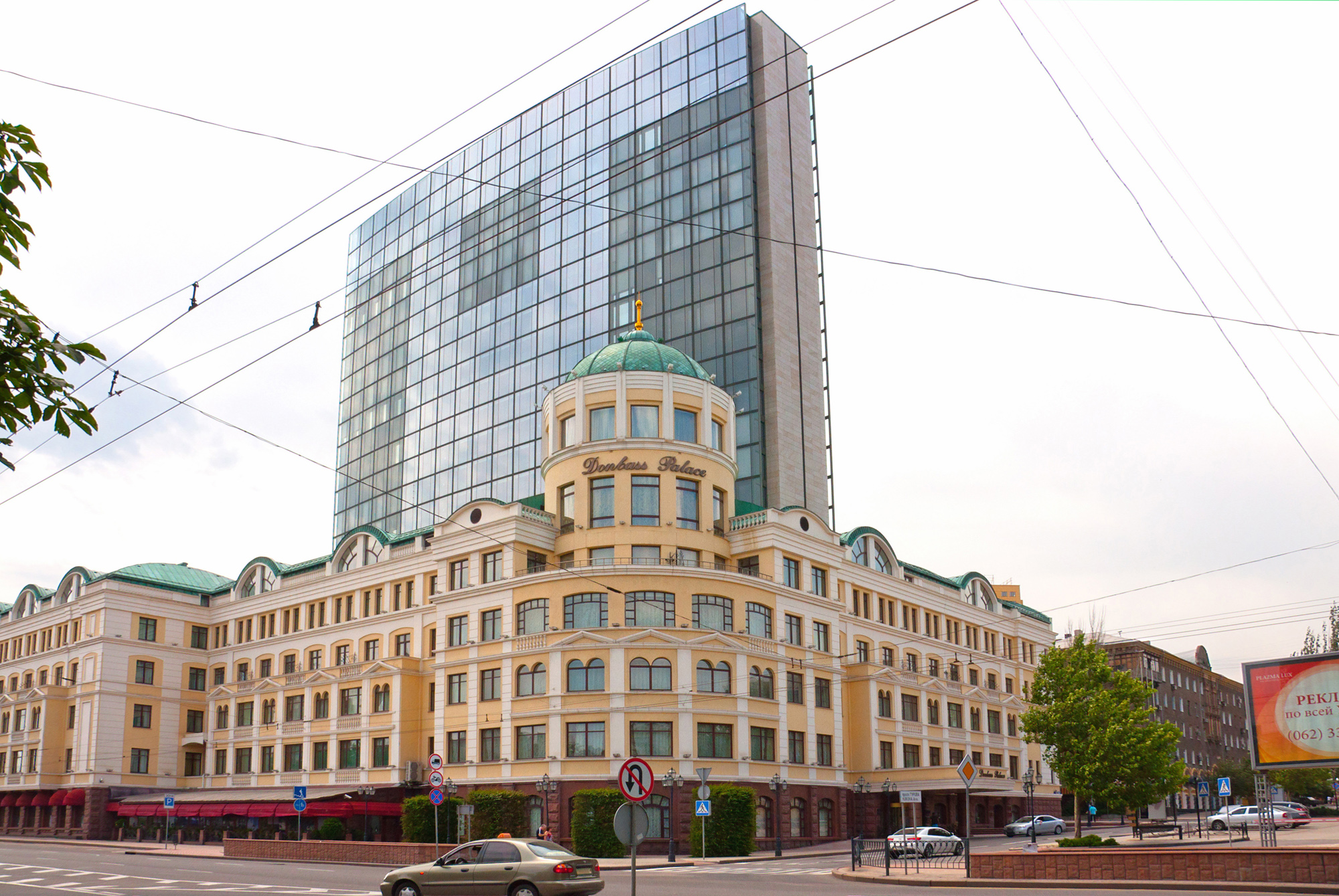
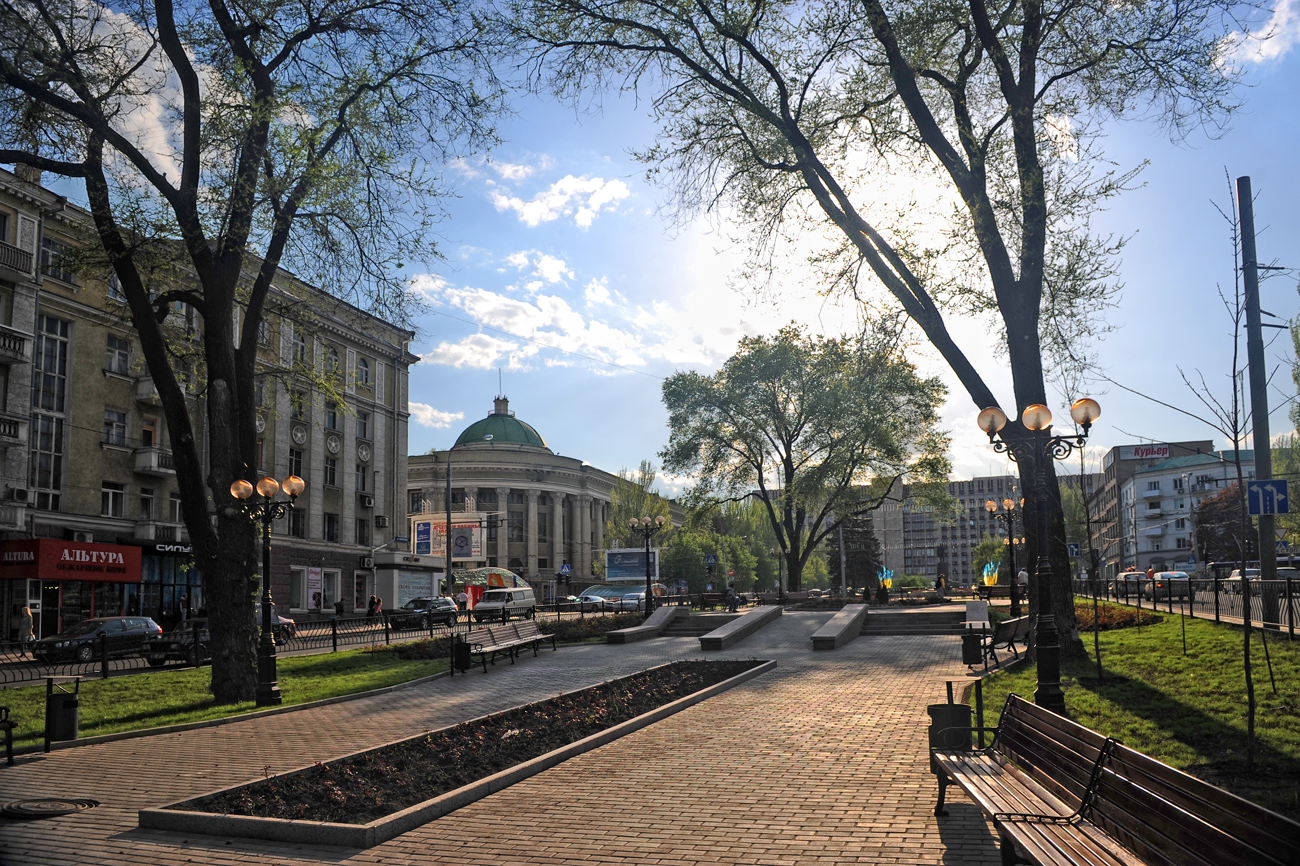
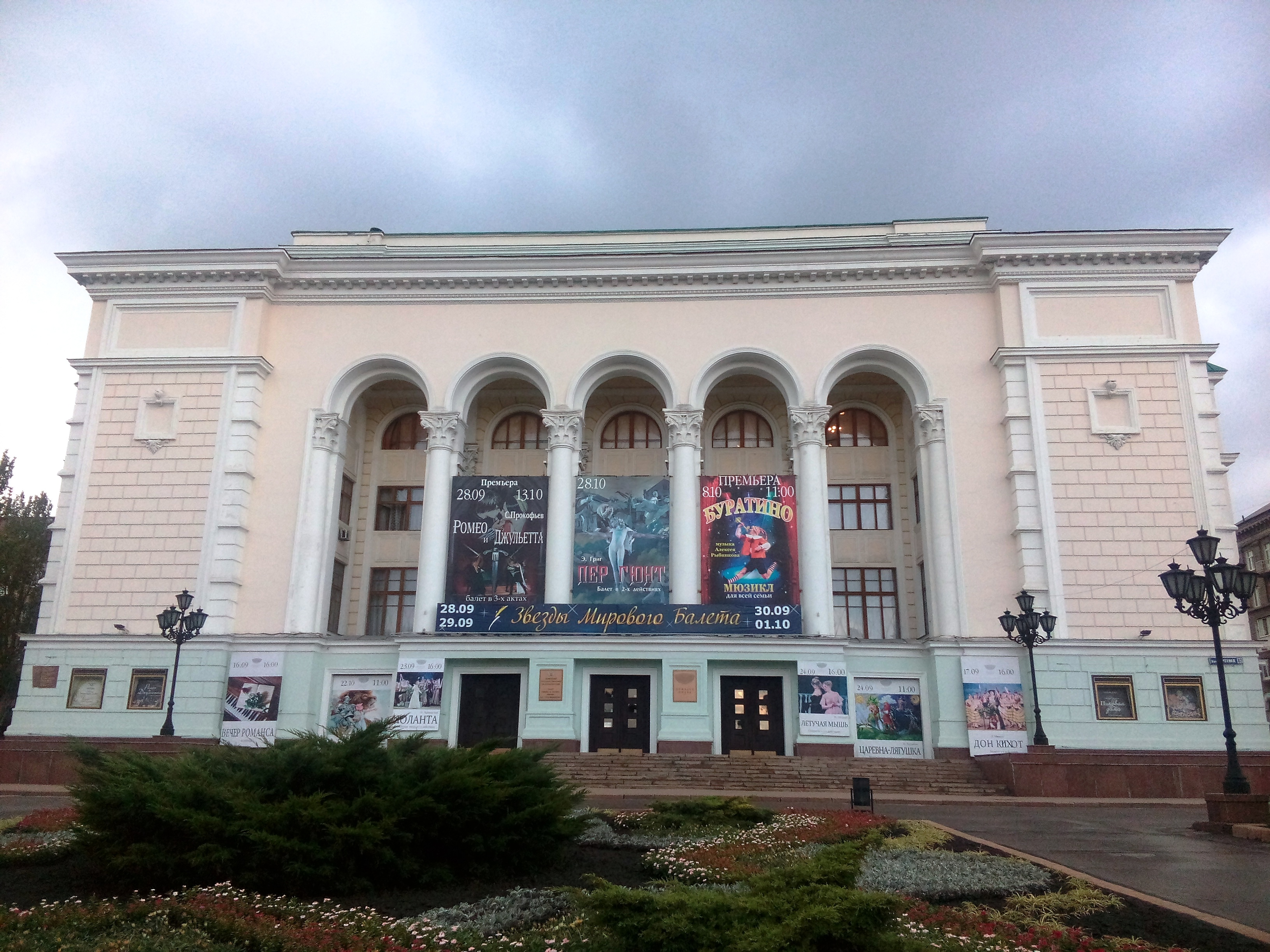
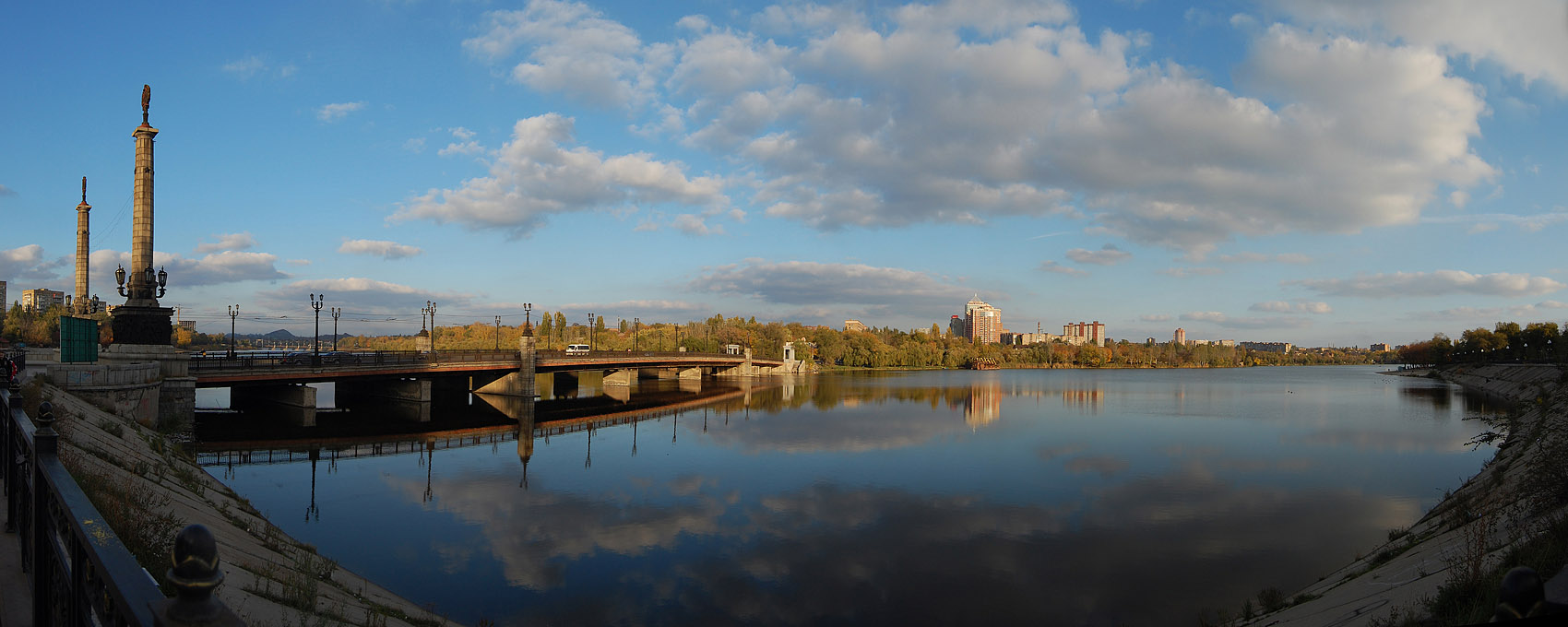
- Transfiguration Cathedral Donbass Palace Shevchenko Boulevard Donbas Arena Opera Theatre Kalmius embankment

- Flag Coat of arms
- Nickname: Miners' Сapital
- Interactive map of Donetsk
- Location within Donetsk Oblast Location within Ukraine Location within Europe
- Coordinates: 48°00′57″N 37°48′10″E
- Country: Ukraine
- Oblast: Donetsk Oblast
- Raion: Donetsk Raion
- Hromada: Donetsk urban hromada
- Founded: 1869
- City rights: 1917
- Founder: John Hughes
- Districts: List of 9: Budonnivskyi District; Voroshylovskyi District; Kalininskyi District; Kyivskyi District; Kirovskyi District; Kuibyshevskyi District; Leninskyi District; Petrovskyi District; Proletarskyi District

Government
  - Mayor: Alexey Kulemzin (installed by Russia; United Russia)

Area
  - City: 358 km^{2} (138 sq mi)
  - Metro: 2,895 km^{2} (1,118 sq mi)
- Elevation: 169 m (554 ft)

Population (2022)
  - City: 901,645
  - Rank: 5th in Ukraine
  - Density: 2,520/km^{2} (6,520/sq mi)
  - Metro: 1,560,000
- Demonym: Donechchany (Ukrainian: Донеччани) or Donchane (Russian: Дончане)
- Time zone: UTC+2 (EET)
  - Summer (DST): UTC+3 (EEST)
- Postal code: 83000–83497
- Area code: +380 622, 623
- Licence plate: АН
- Sister cities: Bochum, Charleroi, Kutaisi, Pittsburgh, Sheffield, Taranto, Moscow, Vilnius
- Climate: Dfb
- Website: donetsk.gosuslugi.ru (Russian city occupational administration)
- Donetsk was founded in 1869 as a workers' settlement Yuzovka/Yuzivka around the metallurgical factory of the Welshman John Hughes. The settlement was established in lands of Yevdokim Shydlovsky, who received them upon destruction of the Zaporizhian Sich in 1775. The population of the metropolitan area is from 2004.

Donetsk (UK: /dɒnˈjɛtsk/, US: /dən-/ dən-; Ukrainian: Донецьк [doˈnɛtsʲk]; Russian: Донецк [dɐˈnʲetsk]), formerly known as Aleksandrovka, Yuzivka (or Hughesovka), Stalin, and Stalino, is an industrial city in eastern Ukraine located on the Kalmius River in Donetsk Oblast, which is currently occupied by Russia as the capital of the Donetsk People's Republic. The population was estimated at 901,645 (2022 estimate) in the city core, with over 2 million in the metropolitan area (2011). According to the 2001 census, Donetsk was the fifth-largest city in Ukraine.

Administratively, Donetsk has been the centre of Donetsk Oblast, while historically, it is the unofficial capital and largest city of the larger economic and cultural Donets Basin (Donbas) region. Donetsk is adjacent to another major city, Makiivka, and along with other surrounding cities forms a major urban sprawl and conurbation in the region. Donetsk has been a major economic, industrial and scientific centre of Ukraine with a high concentration of heavy industries and a skilled workforce. The density of heavy industries (predominantly steel production, chemical industry, and coal mining) determined the city's challenging ecological situation. In 2012, a UN report ranked Donetsk among the world's fastest depopulating cities.

The original settlement was first mentioned as Aleksandrovka in 1779. In 1869, the Welsh businessman John Hughes founded a steel plant and several coal mines in the region, and the town was named Hughesovka or Yuzovka (Юзовка) in recognition of his role ("Yuz" being a Russian-language approximation of Hughes). During Soviet times, the city's steel industry expanded. In 1924, Yuzovka was renamed Stalin. In 1929, Stalin was renamed Stalino, and in 1932, the city became the centre of the Donetsk region. Renamed Donetsk in 1961, the city today remains a centre for coal mining and for the steel industry.

Since April 2014, Donetsk and its surrounding areas have been one of the major sites of fighting in the ongoing Russo-Ukrainian War, as pro-Russian separatist forces battle against Ukrainian military forces for control of the city and surrounding areas. Throughout the war, the city of Donetsk has been administered by the pro-Russian separatist forces as the center of the Donetsk People's Republic (DPR), with outlying territories of the Donetsk region divided between the two sides. Donetsk International Airport became the epicenter of the war in 2014 with almost a year-long battle.

As of June 2026, Russia has full control of the city.

== History ==
=== Foundation and early history ===
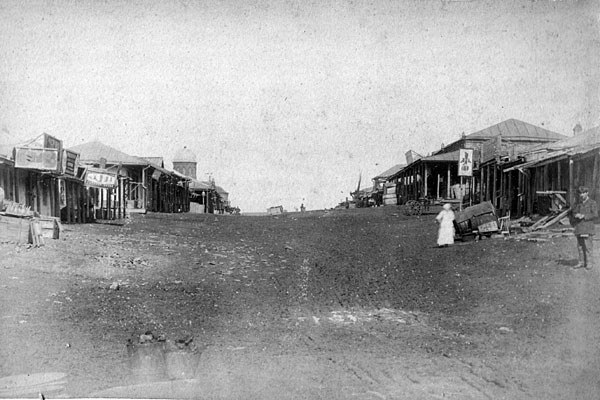
A market on the main street of Novyi Svet section of Yuzovka (1887)

One of the early mining settlements in the territory of Donetsk was Alexandrovka (Oleksandrivka). The existence of Aleksandrovskaya (Oleksandrivska) Cossack sloboda in its place is attested by 1779, with the Aleksandrovsky (Oleksandrivska) coal mine eventually being opened there.

The city of Donetsk was founded in 1869 by Welsh businessman John Hughes, who operated a steel plant and several coal mines at Aleksandrovka. The workers’ settlement at the plant merged with Aleksandrovka and the place was named Yuzovo/Yuzove, later Yuzovka/Yuzivka (Russian: Юзово, Юзовка, Ukrainian: Юзове, Юзівка), after Hughes. In its early period, it received immigrants from Wales, especially from the town of Merthyr Tydfil. By the beginning of the 20th century, Yuzovka had approximately 50,000 inhabitants, and attained the status of a city in 1917. The main district of Yuzovka is named English Colony, and the British origin of the city is reflected in its layout and architecture.

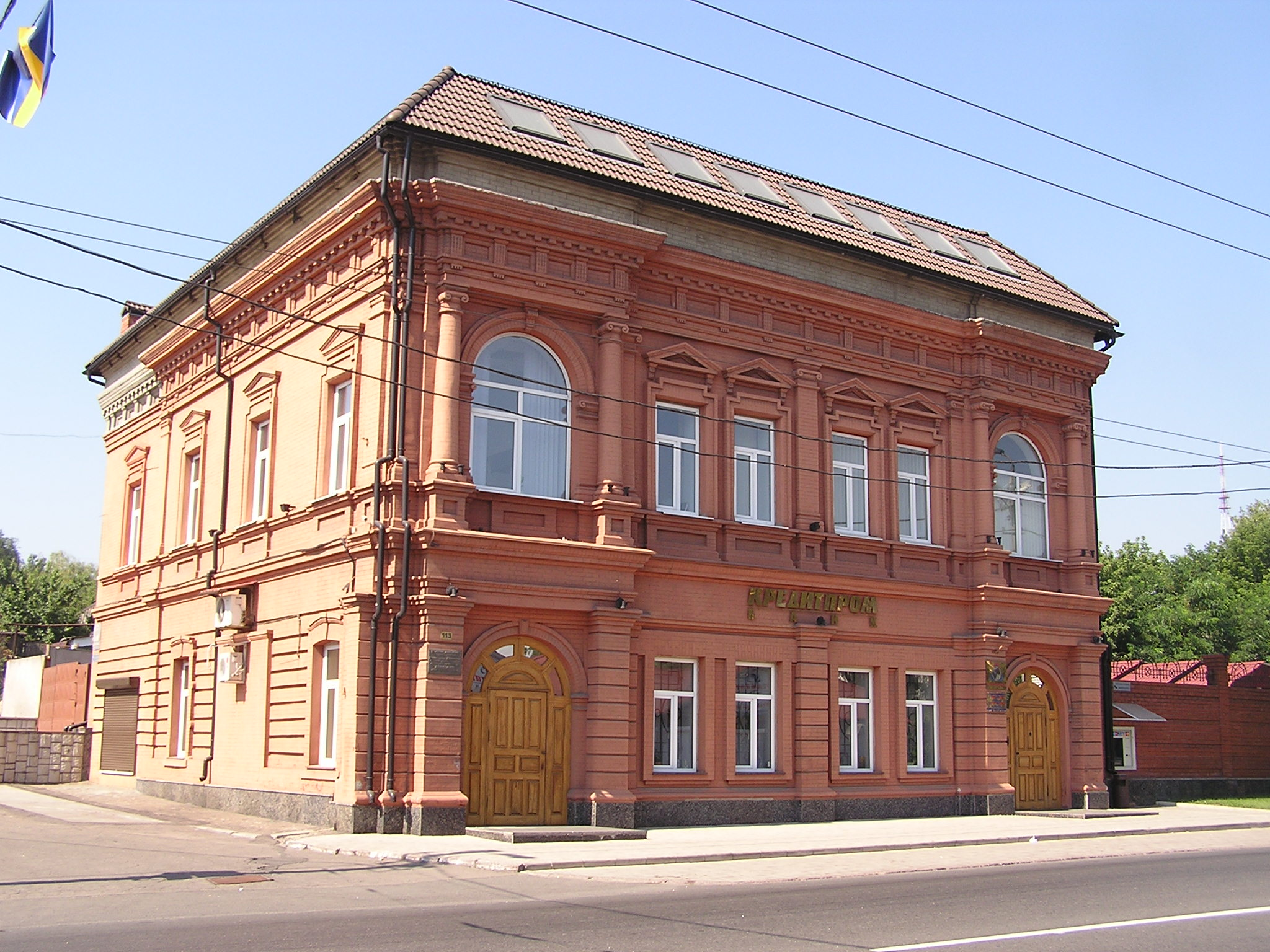
Building of a former English-speaking school for the British in Yuzovka.

When the Ukrainian War of Independence broke out, Yuzivka became a part of the Ukrainian People's Republic as per the Third Universal. It became a part of Cuman Zemlia, the administrative center of which was Bakhmut. During the First Ukrainian–Soviet War, Yuzivka was captured by the Bolshevik forces on 5 January 1918, but then recaptured by Ukraine in April. Soviet forces captured Yuzivka again during the Second Ukrainian–Soviet War. Donetsk became a part of Donetsk-Krivoy Rog Soviet Republic from its declaration of independence on 12 February 1918. The Republic was disbanded at the 2nd All-Ukrainian Congress of Soviets on 20 March 1918, when the independence of the Ukrainian Soviet Republic was declared. It failed to achieve recognition, either internationally or by the Russian SFSR, and was abolished under the Treaty of Brest-Litovsk. After the war, the city was administratively part of the Donets Governorate of Ukraine.

=== Soviet Union ===
In 1924, under Soviet rule, the city's name was changed to Stalin. In that year, the city's population totaled 63,708, and in the next year, 80,085. In 1929–31 the city's name was changed to Stalino. The city did not have a drinking water system until 1931, when a 55.3 km (34.4 mi) system was laid underground. In July 1933, the city became the administrative center of the Donetsk Oblast of the Ukrainian SSR. In 1933, the first 12 km (7 mi) sewer system was installed, and the use of gas began the next year. Some sources state that the city was briefly called Trotsk—after Leon Trotsky—for a few months in late 1923.

A German map of the city in 1943. Note that all the streets have been given German names.

At the start of World War II, the population of Stalino was 507,000. After the war, the population was 175,000. The invasion by Nazi Germany almost completely destroyed the city. It was occupied by German and Italian forces as part of the Reichskommissariat Ukraine between 16 October 1941 and 5 September 1943. The Germans operated the Stalag 386, Stalag 387 and Stalag 397 prisoner-of-war camps, and the Dulag 162, Dulag 181, Dulag 151 and Dulag 182 transit prisoner-of-war camps in the city. The city was mostly rebuilt on a large scale after the war.

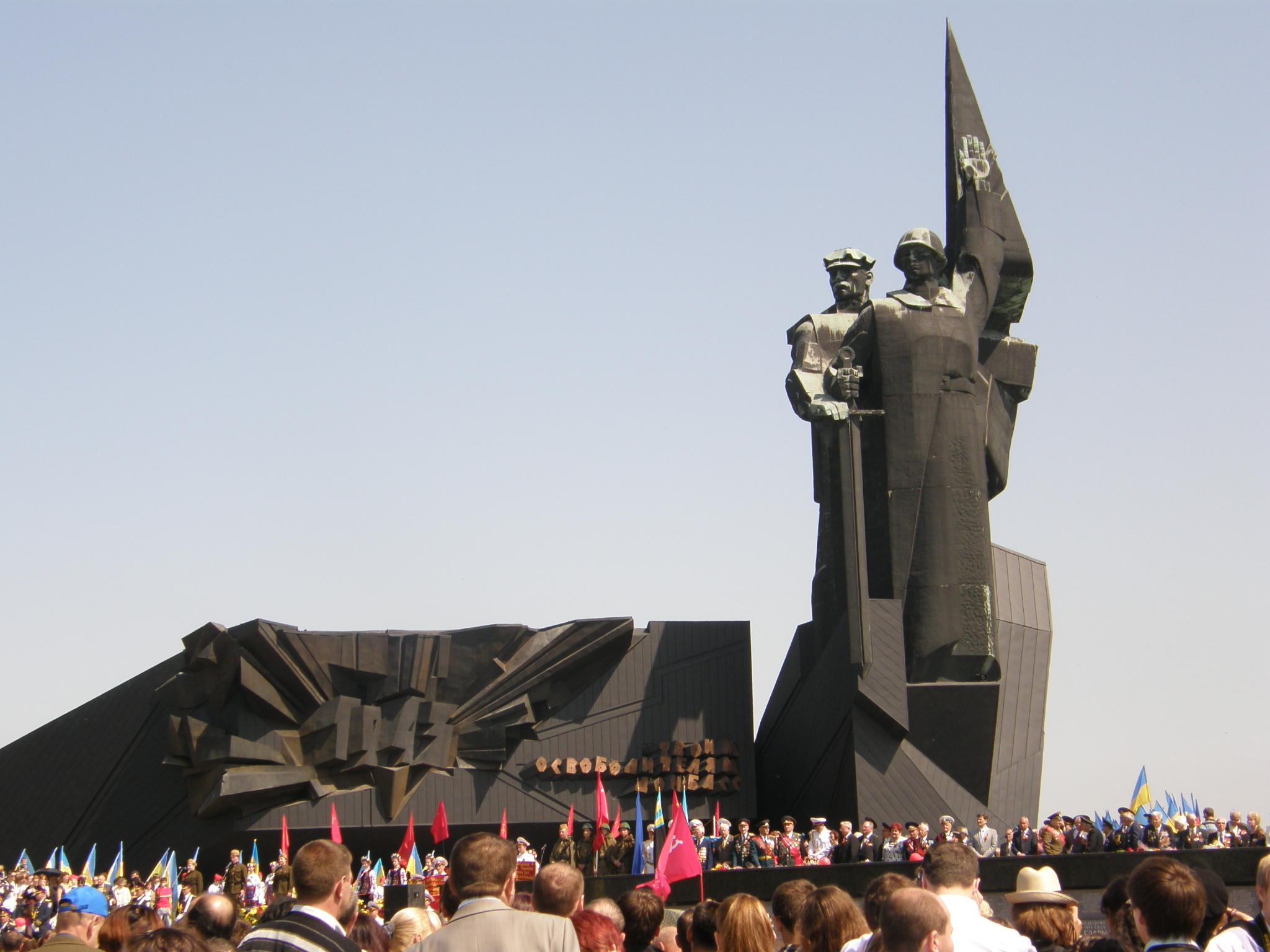
Monument for the Liberators of Donbas, dedicated to the soldiers who liberated Donbas from Nazism during World War II

In 1945, young men and women aged 17 to 35, from the Danube Swabian (Schwowe) communities of Yugoslavia, Hungary and Romania (the Batschka and Banat), were forcibly sent to Russia as Allied "war reparations", being put to work as slave labour to rebuild Stalino and to work in its mines. The conditions were so poor that many died from disease and malnutrition.

During Nikita Khrushchev's second wave of destalinization in November 1961, the city was renamed Donetsk, after the Seversky Donets River, a tributary of the Don in order to distance it from the former leader Joseph Stalin.

In 1965, the Donetsk Academy of Sciences was established as part of the Academy of Sciences of the Ukrainian SSR.

=== Independent Ukraine ===
After the declaration of independence made by the Ukrainian parliament on 24 August 1991 the 1991 Ukrainian independence referendum was held on 1 December 1991. In this referendum 83.90% of Donetsk's voters voted in favour of independence.

After experiencing a tough time in the 1990s, when it was the center of gang wars for control over industrial enterprises, Donetsk modernised quickly, largely under the influence of big companies.

In 1994 a consultative referendum was held in Donetsk Oblast and Luhansk Oblast, with around 90% supporting recognition of Russian as an official language alongside Ukrainian, and for Russian to be an official language on a regional level.

The Donetsk region was the site of various coal mine collapses from the 1990s into the 2010s in which hundreds were killed. These included the 2008 Ukraine coal mine collapse, the 2007 Zasyadko mine disaster, and the 2015 Zasyadko mine disaster. Ukraine has had various mining accidents since the collapse of the Soviet Union in 1991, with a union official stating that the linking of miners' pay to production had served as an incentive to ignore safety procedures that slow production.

In a summit in Moscow in 2008, Donetsk was recognised as the best city in the Commonwealth of Independent States for its implemented development strategies; in 2012 and 2013 Donetsk was recognised as the best place for business in Ukraine.

Whilst getting praise for its business potential in 2009, Donetsk also received criticism for the strong mafia connection of its growing oligarchy, and for an increasing poverty rate. Some analysts warned of a long-term collapse of the Donetsk economy; and that it could share Detroit's gloomy fate, due to its failure to combat crime and poverty.

=== Russo-Ukrainian War ===
After President Viktor Yanukovych fled Ukraine to seek asylum in Russia, Russian-backed separatists took over the Regional State Administration Building, the main government building, in Donetsk. The police did not offer resistance. Later in the week the authorities of Donetsk disallowed a referendum on the status of the region and the police retook the Donetsk OSA building. Donetsk became one of the centers of the 2014 pro-Russian unrest in Ukraine.

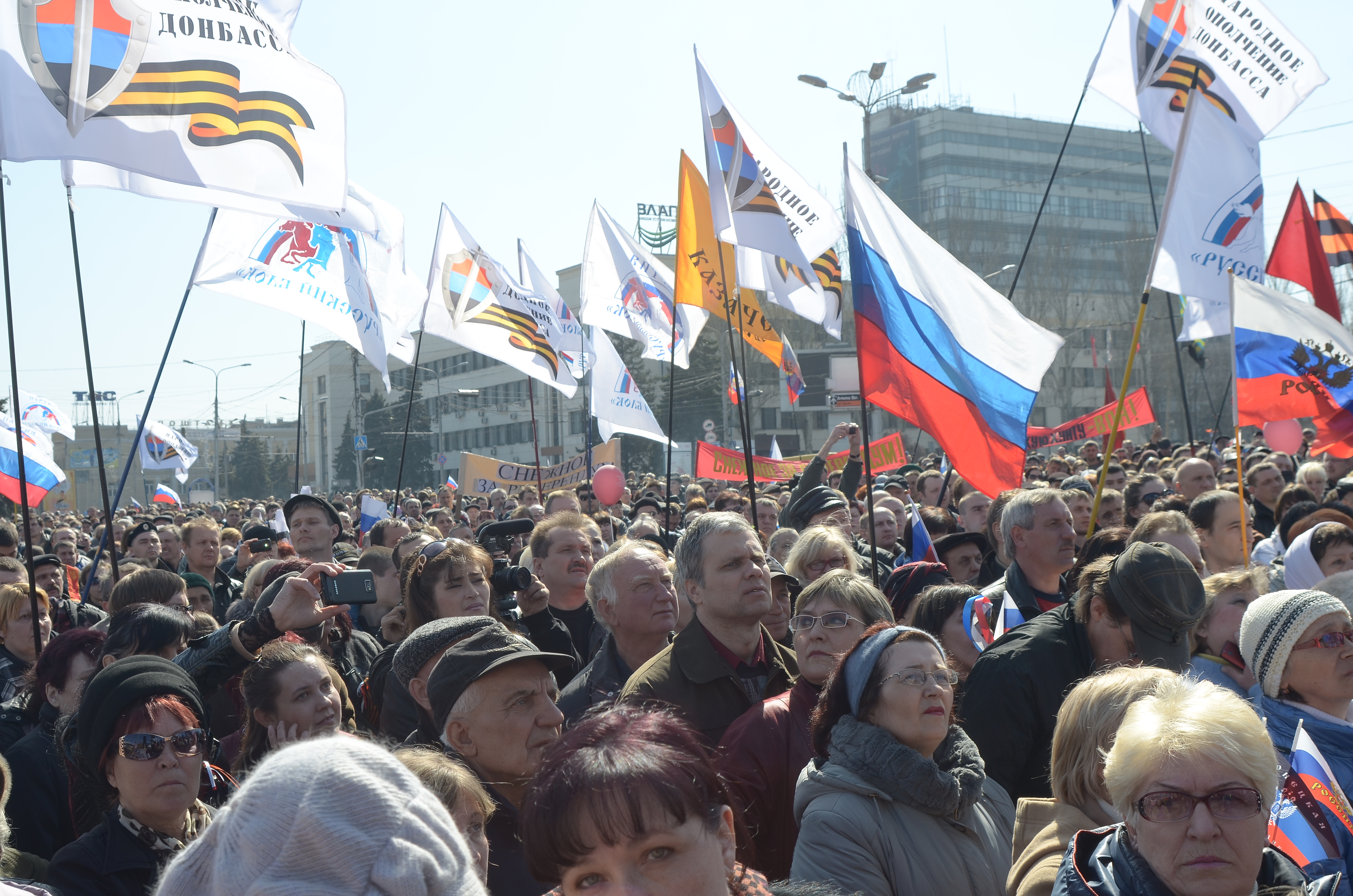
Pro-Russian protesters in Donetsk on 6 April 2014, as the Kremlin deliberately stoked separatist sentiment among some local residents.

On 7 April 2014, pro-Russian activists seized control of Donetsk OSA and declared the "Donetsk People's Republic", asking for Russian intervention.

On 11 May 2014, a referendum on the self-rule was held in Donetsk. The head of the self-proclaimed Donetsk People's Republic election commission, Roman Lyagin, said that almost 90 percent of those who voted in the Donetsk Region endorsed political independence from Kyiv. Ukraine does not recognize the referendum, while the EU and US stated that the polls were illegal.

Heavy shelling by the Ukrainian Army and paramilitary units have caused civilian fatalities in Donetsk. Human Rights Watch has called on both warring factions to cease using the unguided BM-21 Grad missiles in populated areas, and has said the use of these weapons systems was a violation of international humanitarian laws and could constitute a war crime. It also called on the insurgents to avoid their deployment in densely populated areas.

The 2015 IIHF World Championship Division I, Group A was scheduled for 18 to 24 April 2015 in Donetsk, but Ukraine withdrew as hosts due to the ongoing conflict in the country. Instead of Donetsk, the tournament was organized in Kraków, Poland. Eventually, Ukraine co-organized 2017 IIHF World Championship Division I, again Group A, but in its capital, Kyiv.

Following the Russian invasion of Ukraine in February 2022, the area around Donetsk has seen full-scale fighting between Ukrainian forces against Russian forces and their DNR counterparts. Russian-installed local officials have repeatedly accused Ukrainian armed forces of shelling Donetsk. On 30 September 2022, Russian President Vladimir Putin signed a decree annexing four districts, including Donetsk, to Russia. This annexation has been rejected by the global community as a breach of international law. From 2014 on, and especially from 2022, the situation with public utilities worsened with serious disruptions in electricity and water.

== Geography ==
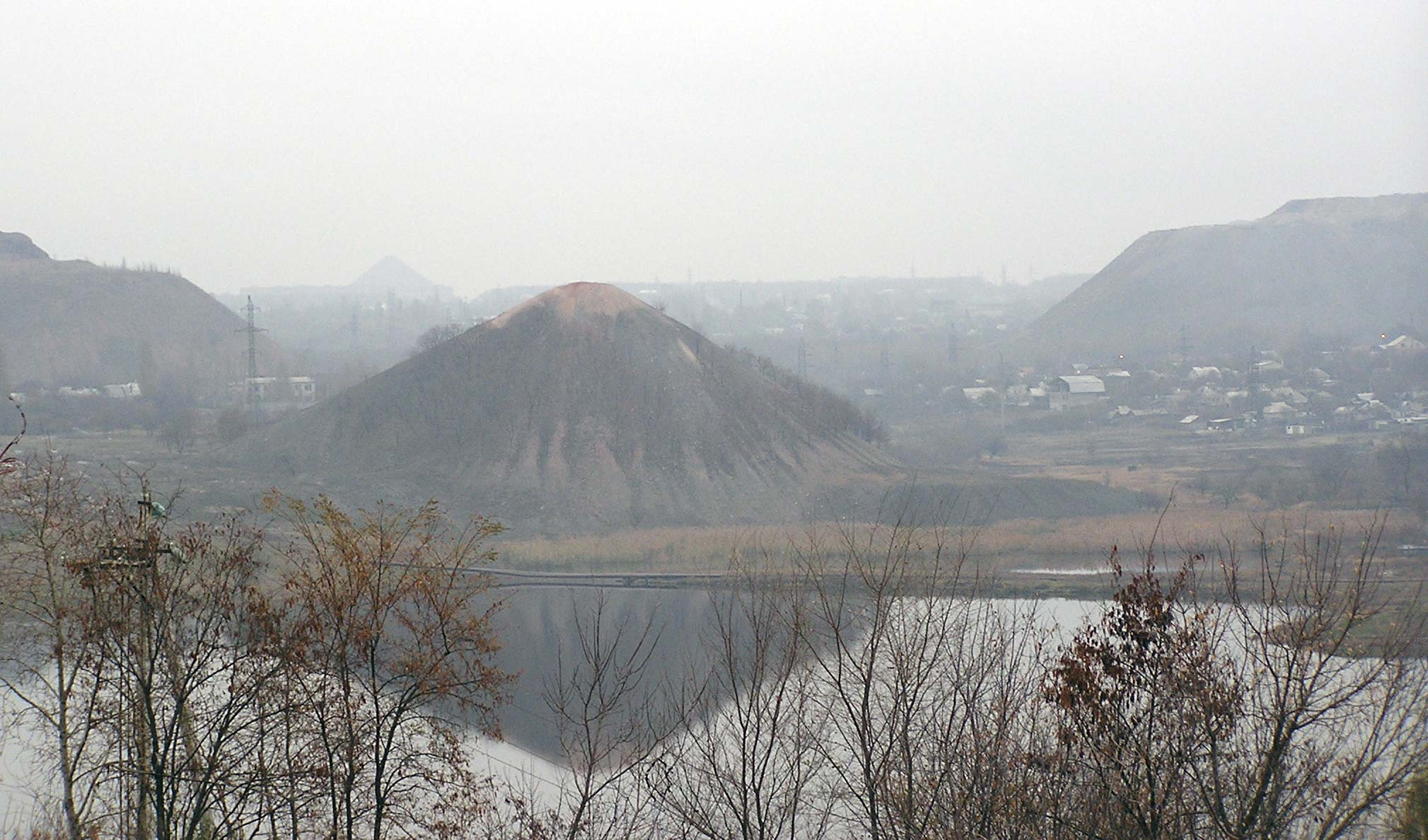
The spoil tips near the Kalmius. In the background is the Chervonohvardiiskyi District of Makiivka.

Donetsk lies in the steppe landscape, surrounded by scattered woodland, hills, spoil tips, rivers and lakes. The northern outskirts are mainly used for agriculture. The Kalmius River links the city with the Sea of Azov, which is 95 km (59 mi) to the south, and a popular recreational area for those living in Donetsk. A wide belt of farmlands surrounds the city.

The city stretches 28 km (17 mi) from north to south and 55 km (34 mi) from east to west. There are 2 nearby reservoirs: Nyzhnekalmius (60 ha), and the Donetsk Sea (206 ha). 5 rivers flow through the city, including the Kalmius, Asmolivka (13 km), Cherepashkyna (23 km), Skomoroshka and Bakhmutka. The city also contains a total of 125 spoil tips.

=== Climate ===
Donetsk's climate is moderate hot summer continental (Köppen: Dfa). The average temperatures are −4.0 °C (25 °F) in January and 22.5 °C (73 °F) in July. The average number of rainfall per year totals 162 days and up to 556 millimetres per year.

Climate data for Donetsk (1991–2020, extremes 1926–present)
Month	Jan	Feb	Mar	Apr	May	Jun	Jul	Aug	Sep	Oct	Nov	Dec	Year
Record high °C (°F)	12.8 (55.0)	16.0 (60.8)	23.8 (74.8)	31.0 (87.8)	34.6 (94.3)	35.8 (96.4)	37.8 (100.0)	39.1 (102.4)	33.9 (93.0)	32.7 (90.9)	20.3 (68.5)	15.0 (59.0)	39.1 (102.4)
Mean daily maximum °C (°F)	−1.2 (29.8)	−0.4 (31.3)	6.1 (43.0)	15.0 (59.0)	21.5 (70.7)	25.7 (78.3)	28.5 (83.3)	27.9 (82.2)	21.4 (70.5)	13.4 (56.1)	5.2 (41.4)	0.0 (32.0)	13.6 (56.5)
Daily mean °C (°F)	−4.0 (24.8)	−3.5 (25.7)	2.0 (35.6)	9.8 (49.6)	15.9 (60.6)	20.1 (68.2)	22.5 (72.5)	21.8 (71.2)	15.7 (60.3)	8.9 (48.0)	2.1 (35.8)	−2.5 (27.5)	9.1 (48.3)
Mean daily minimum °C (°F)	−6.5 (20.3)	−6.4 (20.5)	−1.6 (29.1)	5.0 (41.0)	10.3 (50.5)	14.5 (58.1)	16.7 (62.1)	15.9 (60.6)	10.6 (51.1)	5.0 (41.0)	−0.6 (30.9)	−4.9 (23.2)	4.8 (40.7)
Record low °C (°F)	−33.5 (−28.3)	−31.1 (−24.0)	−24.8 (−12.6)	−10.6 (12.9)	−4.4 (24.1)	2.1 (35.8)	5.8 (42.4)	2.0 (35.6)	−6.0 (21.2)	−10.3 (13.5)	−22.7 (−8.9)	−28.5 (−19.3)	−33.5 (−28.3)
Average precipitation mm (inches)	38 (1.5)	31 (1.2)	37 (1.5)	38 (1.5)	50 (2.0)	65 (2.6)	52 (2.0)	40 (1.6)	43 (1.7)	41 (1.6)	37 (1.5)	44 (1.7)	516 (20.4)
Average extreme snow depth cm (inches)	6 (2.4)	11 (4.3)	6 (2.4)	0 (0)	0 (0)	0 (0)	0 (0)	0 (0)	0 (0)	0 (0)	1 (0.4)	4 (1.6)	11 (4.3)
Average rainy days	11	8	10	13	13	14	11	8	11	11	13	11	134
Average snowy days	17	17	10	2	0	0	0	0	0	2	8	16	72
Average relative humidity (%)	86.5	83.8	76.9	64.5	61.8	64.2	61.4	58.5	67.1	77.1	84.9	87.7	72.9
Source 1: Pogoda.ru.net
Source 2: NOAA (humidity 1991–2020)

== Government and administrative divisions ==
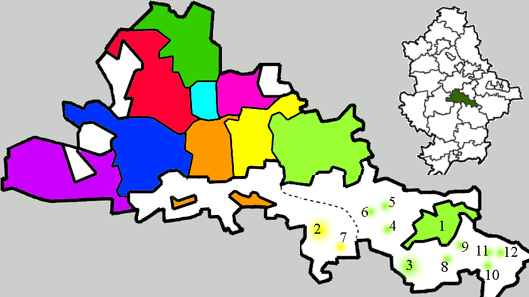
Districts of Donetsk on the territory of the Donetsk City Municipality: Budonnivskyi District Voroshylovskyi District Kalininskyi District Kyivskyi District Kirovskyi District / Kuibyshevskyi District Leninskyi District Petrovskyi District Proletarskyi District

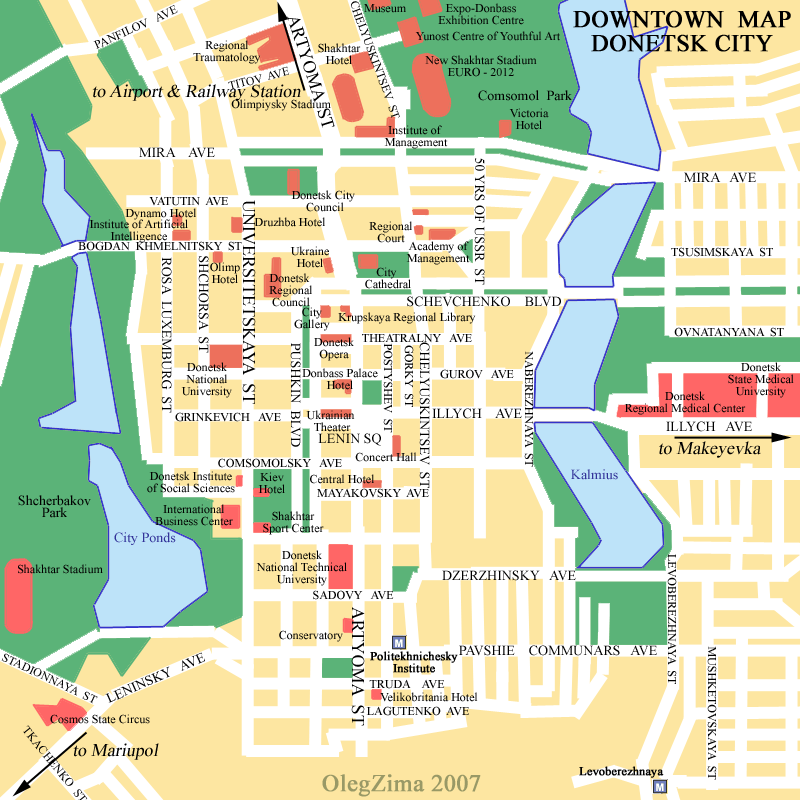
City centre

Starting on 7 April 2014, Donetsk was de facto governed by the Donetsk People's Republic as its capital city. The Donetsk People's Republic was at that time not recognized internationally, and all UN member states recognized the city as Ukrainian. However, in February 2022, Russia recognized the DPR and the neighboring Luhansk People's Republic as sovereign states, and later that year officially annexed them (along with various other parts of Ukraine that were then at least partially under Russian military occupation). The member states of the United Nations still overwhelmingly considered the areas to be Ukrainian, with only Syria, North Korea, and Russia itself considering them to be Russian.

The territory of Donetsk is divided into 9 administrative districts, whose local government is administered by district councils, which are subordinate to the Donetsk City Council.

On 26 February 2026, the Donetsk Oblast Military Administration renamed eight districts as part of the decommunization and derussification campaign; their new de jure names are shown in parentheses in the table below.

#	Districts	Area	Population
1	Budonnivskyi (Bohodukhivskyi) District	25 km^{2}	100,300
2	Voroshylovskyi (Yuzivskyi) District	10 km^{2}	97,300
3	Kalininskyi (Kalynivskyi) District	19 km^{2}	109,700
4	Kyivskyi District	33 km^{2}	143,700
5	Kirovskyi (Rutchenkivskyi) District	68 km^{2}	171,700
6	Kuibyshevskyi (Smolianskyi) District	51 km^{2}	120,800
7	Leninskyi (Oleksandrivskyi) District	37 km^{2}	107,800
8	Petrovskyi (Voznesenskyi) District	57 km^{2}	88,600
9	Proletarskyi (Chumakivskyi) District	58 km^{2}	102,800

== Demographics ==
Historical population

Year	Pop.	±% p.a.
1897	28,100	—
1923	32,023	+0.50%
1926	105,739	+48.91%
1939	446,268	+11.71%
1959	704,821	+2.31%
1970	878,590	+2.02%
1979	1,020,779	+1.68%
1989	1,109,102	+0.83%
1992	1,121,400	+0.37%
1998	1,065,400	−0.85%
2001	1,016,194	−1.56%

Year	Pop.	±% p.a.
2003	1,009,064	−0.35%
2004	1,004,379	−0.46%
2005	999,975	−0.44%
2006	993,519	−0.65%
2007	988,186	−0.54%
2008	980,862	−0.74%
2009	974,598	−0.64%
2010	968,250	−0.65%
2011	962,049	−0.64%
2012	955,041	−0.73%
2013	953,217	−0.19%

Year	Pop.	±% p.a.
2014	949,825	−0.36%
2015	936,257	−1.43%
2016	929,063	−0.77%
2017	927,201	−0.20%
2018	918,917	−0.89%
2019	913,323	−0.61%
2020	908,456	−0.53%
2021	905,364	−0.34%
2022	901,645	−0.41%

Donetsk had a population of over 985,000 inhabitants in 2009 and over 1,566,000 inhabitants in the metropolitan area in 2004. It was the fifth-largest city in Ukraine.

The structure of the Donetsk City Municipality by ethnicity as of the Ukrainian Census of 2001:

1. Russians: 493,392 people, 48.15%
2. Ukrainians: 478,041 people, 46.65%
3. Belarusians: 11,769 people, 1.15%
4. Pontic Greeks (including Caucasus Greeks): 10,180 people, 0.99%
5. Jews: 5,087 people, 0.50%
6. Tatars: 4,987 people, 0.49%
7. Armenians: 4,050 people, 0.40%
8. Azerbaijanis: 2,098 people, 0.20%
9. Georgians: 2,073 people, 0.20%
10. Other: 13,001 people, 1.27%

Total: 1,024,678 people

Native language of the population of the city of Donetsk:

- Russian 87.8%
- Ukrainian 11.1%
- Armenian 0.1%
- Belarusian 0.1%

In a 1991 poll one-third of the population identified as Russian, one-third as Ukrainian while the majority of the rest declared themselves Slavs. Smaller minorities include in particular ethnic groups from the South Caucasus and northeast Anatolia region, including Armenians, Azerbaijanis, Georgians, and Pontic Greeks (including those defined as Caucasus Greeks).

== Economy ==
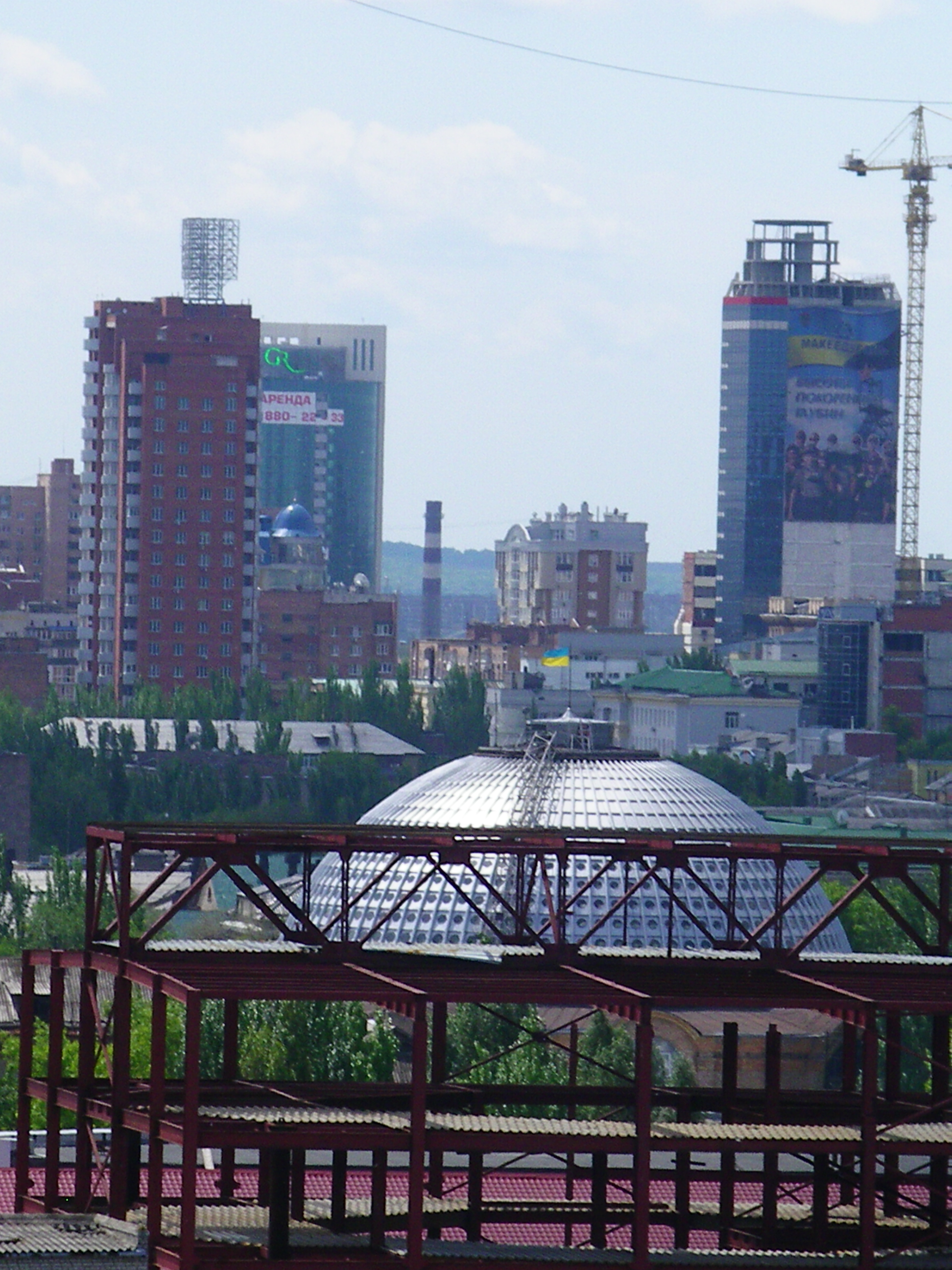
Congress Hall

Donetsk and the surrounding territories are heavily urbanised and agglomerated into conurbation. The workforce is heavily involved with heavy industry, especially coal mining. The city is an important center of heavy industry and coal mines in the Donets Basin (Donbas). Directly under the city lie coal mines, which have recently seen an increase in mining accidents, the most recent accident being at the Zasyadko mine, which killed over 100 workers.

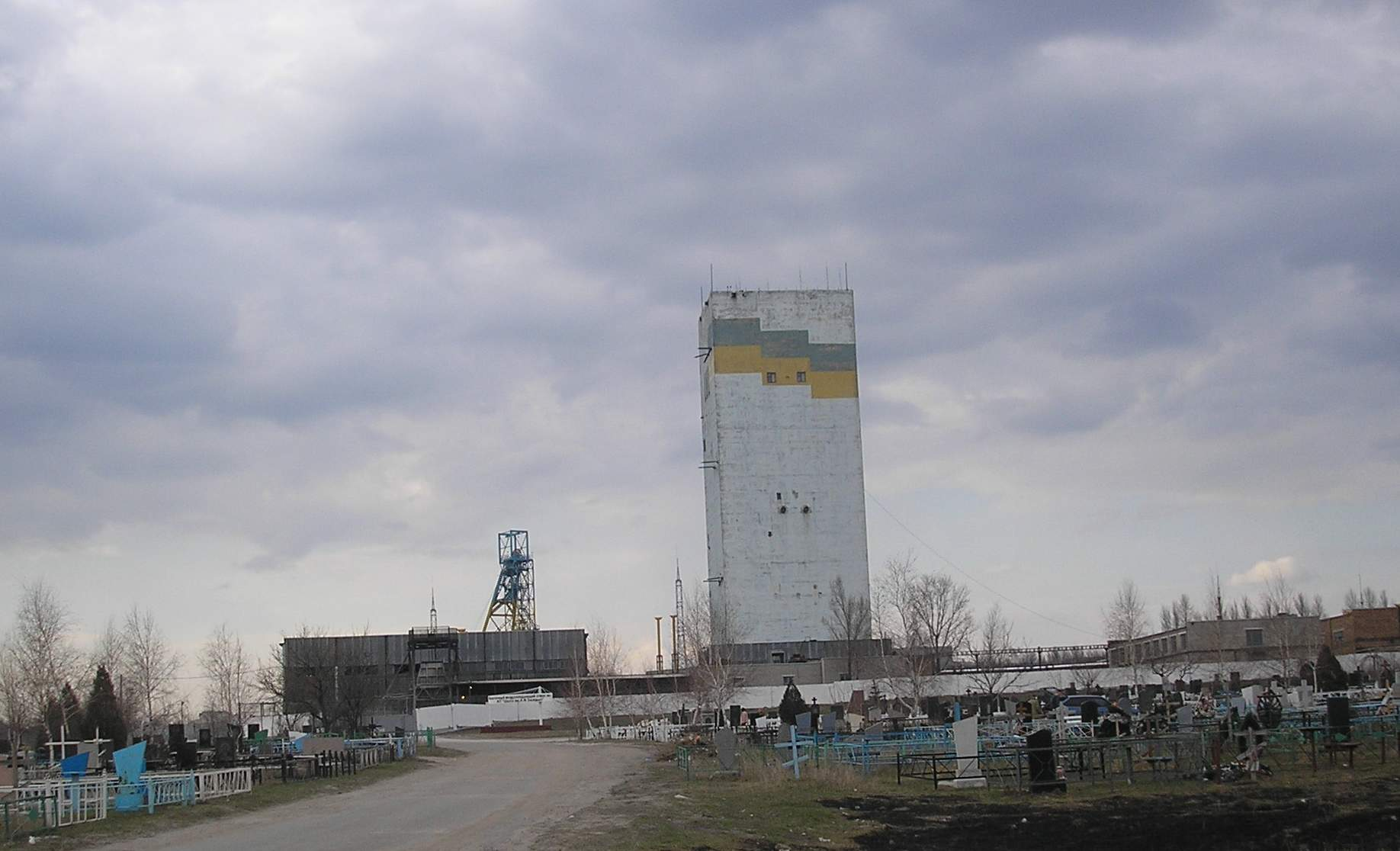
Donetsk Zasyadko coal mine, infamous for its mining accidents

Donetsk's economy consists of about 200 industrial organizations that have a total production output of more than 120 billion rubles per year and more than 20,000 medium-small sized organizations. The city's coal mining industry comprises 17 coal mines and two concentrating mills; the metallurgy industry comprises 5 large metallurgical plants located throughout the city; the engineering market comprises 67 organizations, and the food industry — 32 organizations.

After the fall of the Soviet Union, Donetsk and other neighboring cities of the Donbas suffered heavily, as many factories were closed down and many inhabitants lost their jobs. About 412,000 m^{2} (4,434,731 sq ft) of living space, 7.9 km (4.9 mi) of gas networks, and 15.1 km (9.4 mi) of water supply networks were constructed in the city during 1998–2001.

The city also houses the "Donetsk" special economic zone. Donetsk currently has nine sister cities. The German city of Magdeburg had economic partnerships with Donetsk during 1962–1996.

In 2012, Donetsk was rated the best city for business in Ukraine by Forbes. Donetsk topped the rating in five indicators: human capital, the purchasing power of citizens, investment situation, economic stability, as well as infrastructure and comfort.

The shopping areas in the city include the enclosed shopping mall Donetsk City.

== Sports ==
Donetsk is a large sports center, has a developed infrastructure, and has repeatedly held international competitions – Davis Cup, UEFA Champions League. Representatives of the city are state leaders sports such as football, hockey, basketball, boxing, tennis, athletics and others.

The most popular sport in Donetsk is football. Shakhtar Donetsk won the Ukrainian Championship and Ukrainian Cup multiple times and in 2009 they became the second team from Ukraine (after FC Dynamo Kyiv) to win a European competition, the UEFA Cup. It played at the Donbas Arena prior to 2014 but has played at NSC Olimpiyskiy in Kyiv since May 2020. A second club using the name FC Shakhtyor Donetsk was formed in 2025 and plays in the Russian Second League Division B.

Two important teams - FC Metalurh Donetsk and FC Olimpik Donetsk - were dissolved in 2015 and 2021 respectively. Donetsk was also home to the women's football club WFC Donchanka, one of the most successful clubs in the history of the Ukrainian Women's League, but it ceased operations in 2014.

Donbas Arena stadium was opened in 2009.

Donetsk is home to the football stadium Donbas Arena, which was opened in 2009. It became the first stadium in Eastern Europe designed and constructed according to the UEFA standards for stadiums of "Elite" category. When the joint bid for the UEFA Euro 2012 was won by Poland and Ukraine, Donetsk's Donbas Arena was chosen as the location for three Group D matches, one quarter-final match, and one semi-final match. The RSK Olimpiyskyi Stadium was chosen as a reserve stadium.

Donetsk, together with the nearby Mariupol, were the host towns of the 2009 UEFA European Under-19 Championship. The stadiums hosting the event on behalf of Donetsk were RSC Olimpiyskiy (which hosted the final) and the Metalurh Stadium.

Donetsk is home to the ice hockey club HC Donbass, playing at the Druzhba Arena since 2011 (but discontinuing operations is 2014 and then moving to Druzhkivka in 2015), which won the 2011 Ukrainian Hockey Championship, and which is the only elite level team in the country. After playing a single season in the Russian Major League, the club upgraded its arena to Kontinental Hockey League regulations, and joined the league in 2012. When moving to the KHL, the club created a local farm club to play in the Ukrainian Championship under the name HC Donbass-2, which won the 2012 and 2013 national titles. In 2013 Donetsk was hosting the 2012–13 IIHF Continental Cup ice hockey Super Final, which HC Donbass won, and the 2013 IIHF World Championship Division I – Group B, where Ukraine finished 1st and earned promotion to Group A (both were hosted at the Druzhba Arena). After the team resumed operations in 2015, it withdrew from the KHL, ultimately ending up in the Ukrainian Hockey League, where it has won four of the last five championships.

Donetsk was also home to the basketball club BC Donetsk, which played in the Ukrainian Basketball Super League, and won the 2012 champion title. The club played at the Druzhba Arena, and Donetsk had been chosen as one of the 6 Ukrainian cities to host the FIBA EuroBasket 2015. However, the club discontinued play after 2014 due to the ongoing war, and the 2015 FIBA tournament was moved out of the country.

The city used to be the home of few notable at the time yet now defunct clubs. The MFC Shakhtar Donetsk club won the Ukrainian futsal championship five times, but was dissolved in January 2011 midway through the season due to financial problems (at the time – the most titled club in Ukraine). One of the top Soviet volleyball teams at the time, VC Shakhtar Donetsk, who were the last team to win the Soviet Volleyball Championship, in 1992. The team also won the first two championships in the independent Ukraine league, in 1992 and 1993 (the 1992 Ukraine championship was held in Donetsk), and won the Ukraine Cup in 1993, but after having financial issues, the club was relegated in 1997, and after one season in the second tier it was shut down.

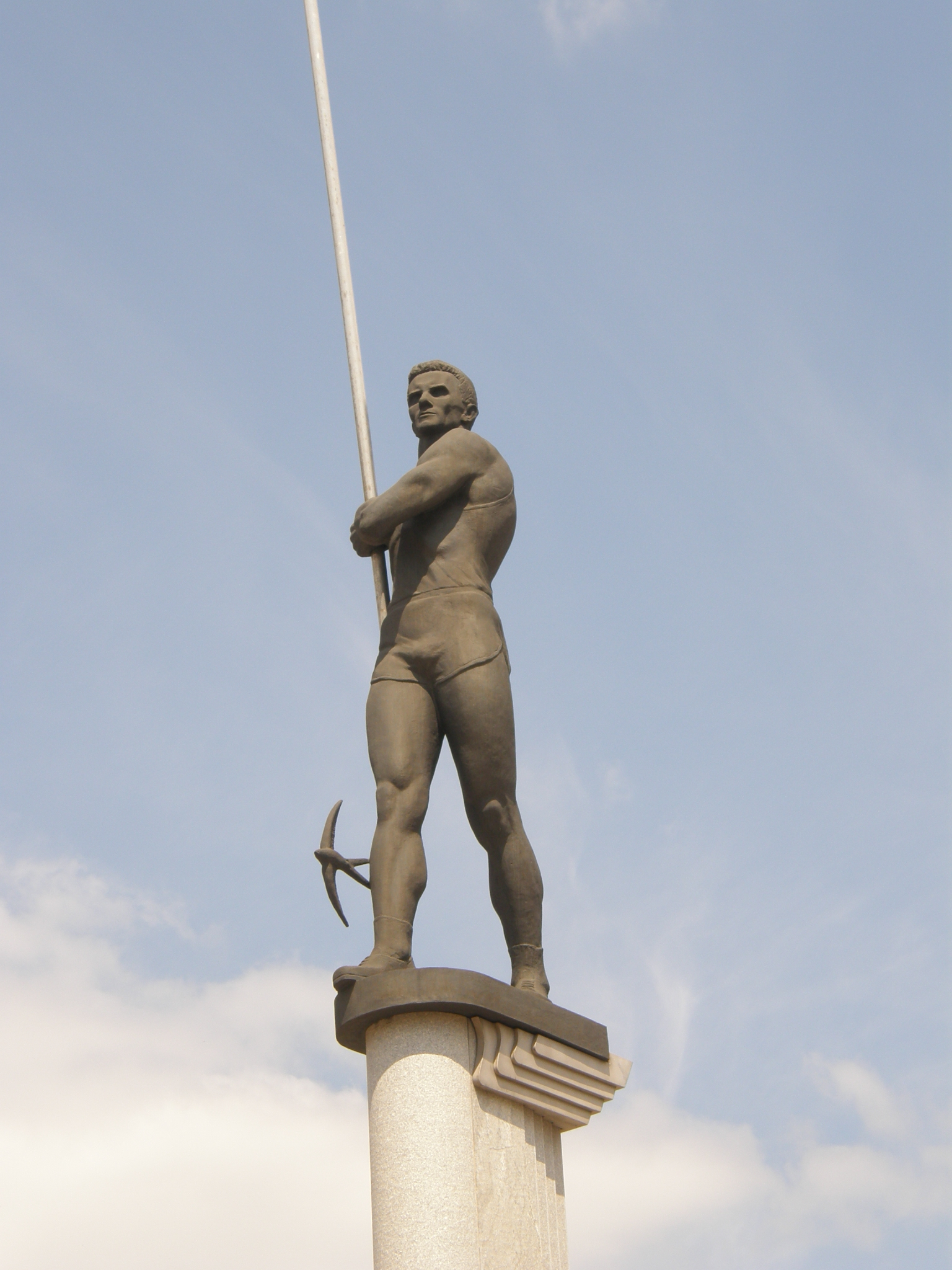
The statue of pole vault legend Serhii Bubka which stands in Donetsk near the RSC Olimpiyskiy

Donetsk hosted the USSR Tennis Championship in 1978, 1979 and 1980, and hosted some tennis matches of the 2005 Davis Cup. Donetsk was home to the Alexander Kolyaskin Memorial, which was held between 2002 and 2008 and part of the ATP Challenger Series, and Donetsk is the home of the female Viccourt Cup, which is classified as an ITF Women's Circuit and started in 2012.

Donetsk was always an important athletics centre, and hosted various events. Donetsk was one of the host towns for the 1978 and 1980 Soviet Athletics Championships, and was the sole host town of the event in 1984. Donetsk also hosted the 1977 European Athletics Junior Championships. The stadium used for those athletics events was the RSC Olimpiyskiy (at the time called RSC Lokomotiv).

Among the different track and field sports, Donetsk especially has a big name in pole vaulting. Serhii Bubka, regarded by many as the greatest pole vaulter in history, grew up in the city, and also started in 1992 an annual pole vaulting event in Donetsk, called Pole Vault Stars. Bubka himself set the world indoor record at the event three times (1990, 1991, 1993). His indoor world pole vault record of 6.15 m, set in the Donetsk Olympic Stadium on 21 February 1993, was not broken until 2014. The Russian female pole vaulter Yelena Isinbayeva set a new world record at the event every year between 2004 and 2009.

The 2015 IIHF World Championship Division I ice hockey tournament had been scheduled for 18 to 24 April 2015 in Donetsk but was later moved to Kraków, Poland due to the ongoing war.

=== Professional sports teams ===
The following is a list of existing professional sports teams, and notable (title-winning) defunct clubs. None of the clubs currently play in the city due to the Russo-Ukrainian War.

Club	League	Sport	Venue	Established	Championships
FC Shakhtar Donetsk	Ukrainian Premier League	Association football	Donbas Arena/NSC Olimpiyskyi (Kyiv)	1936	16
FC Metalurh Donetsk	Ukrainian Premier League	Association football	Metalurh Stadium (Donetsk)/Obolon Arena	1996	0
FC Olimpik Donetsk	Ukrainian Premier League	Association football	Sports Complex Olimpik/Yunist Stadium (Chernihiv)	2001	0
WFC Donchanka (defunct)	Ukrainian Women's League	Women's association football	TsPOR Donchanka Stadium	1992	5
MFC Shakhtar Donetsk (defunct)	Ukrainian Futsal Championship	Futsal	Pavilion	1998	5
HC Donbas	Ukrainian Handball Super League	Handball	SC Tekstilshik/SC Dynamo (Zaporizhzhia)	1983	3
HC Donbass	Ukrainian Hockey League	Ice hockey	Druzhba Arena/Altair Arena (Druzhkivka)	2005	Ukraine: 4 (2 as affiliate HC Donbass-2)
BC Donetsk (defunct)	Ukrainian SuperLeague	Basketball	Druzhba Arena	2006	1
VC Shakhtar Donetsk (defunct)	Ukrainian Volleyball Championship	Volleyball	Druzhba Arena	1983	Soviet Union: 1 Ukraine: 2

== Culture ==
=== Attractions ===
==== First Line Avenue (Artema Street) ====
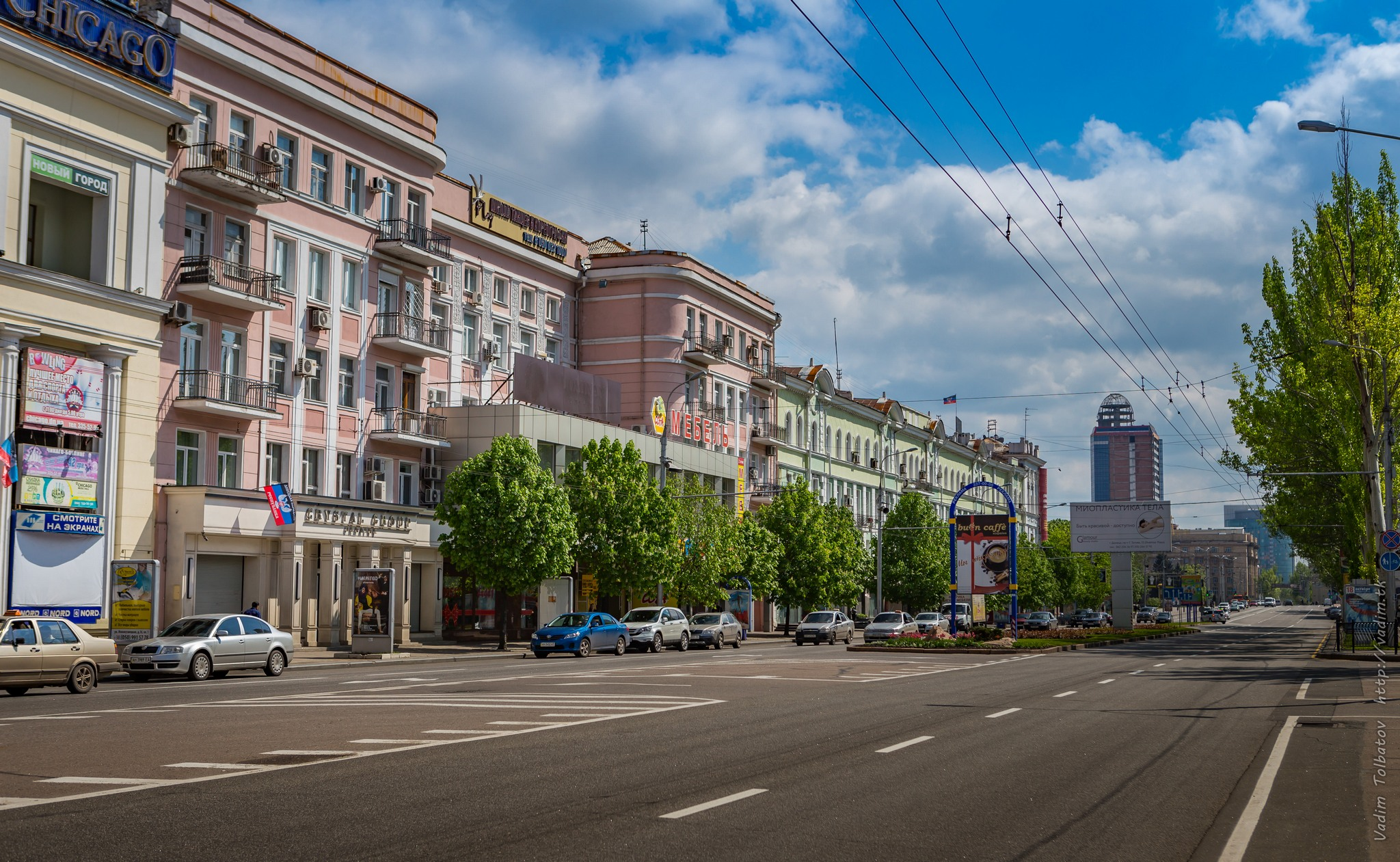
Artema Street in 2016.

First Line Avenue, also known as Artema Street, is considered to be the main part of Donetsk. It generally functions as the foremost place to start for any tourist trip around the city. The street hosts a mix of new and old architecture together with small parks, hotels, shopping centers and restaurants. Noteworthy sites include Lenin Square, the Opera & Ballet Theatre, Monument to Coalminers and Donetsk Drama Theatre.

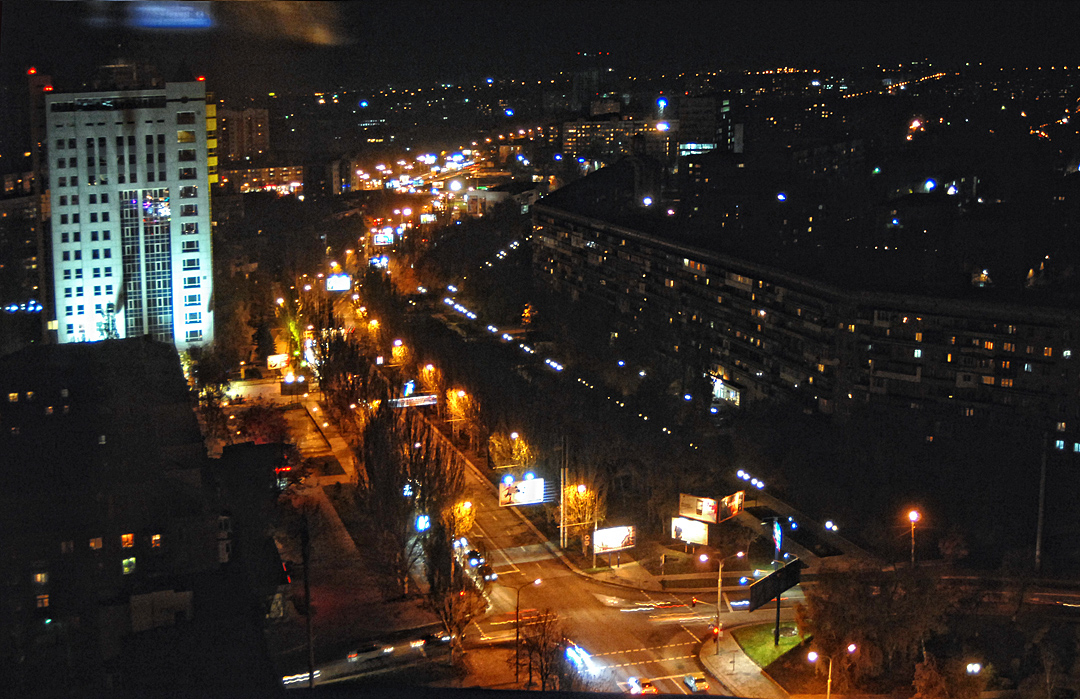
Panorama of Artema Street

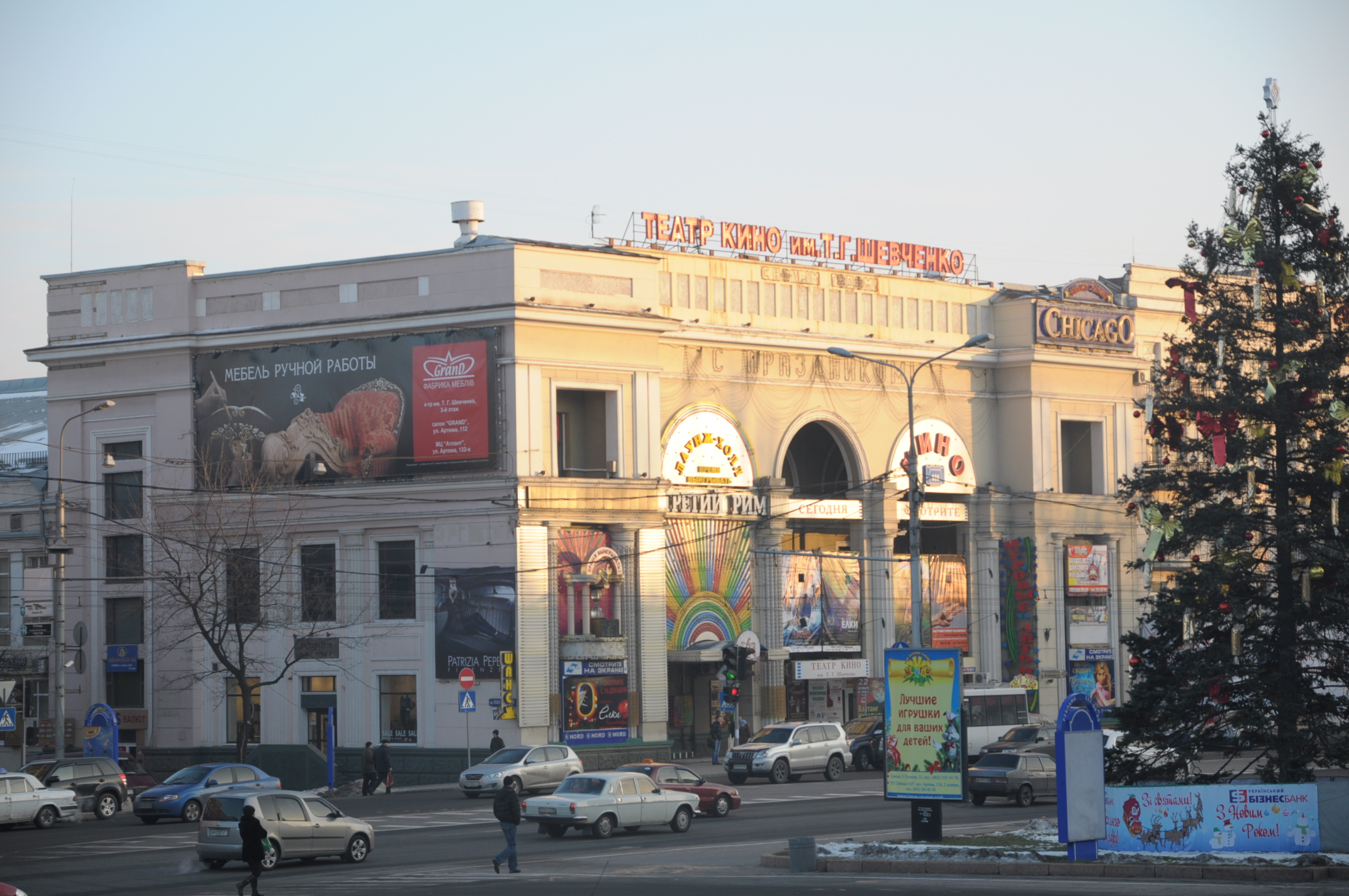
Donetsk Shevchenko Cinema on Artema Street

==== Statue of Artyom (Fyodor Sergeyev) ====
This six meter tall statue on Artema Street is a tribute to Soviet politician Fyodor Sergeyev.

==== Donetsk Opera and Ballet Theatre ====
Built in 1936, the Donetsk State Academic Opera and Ballet Theatre has been home to the Donetsk Ballet company since 1946.

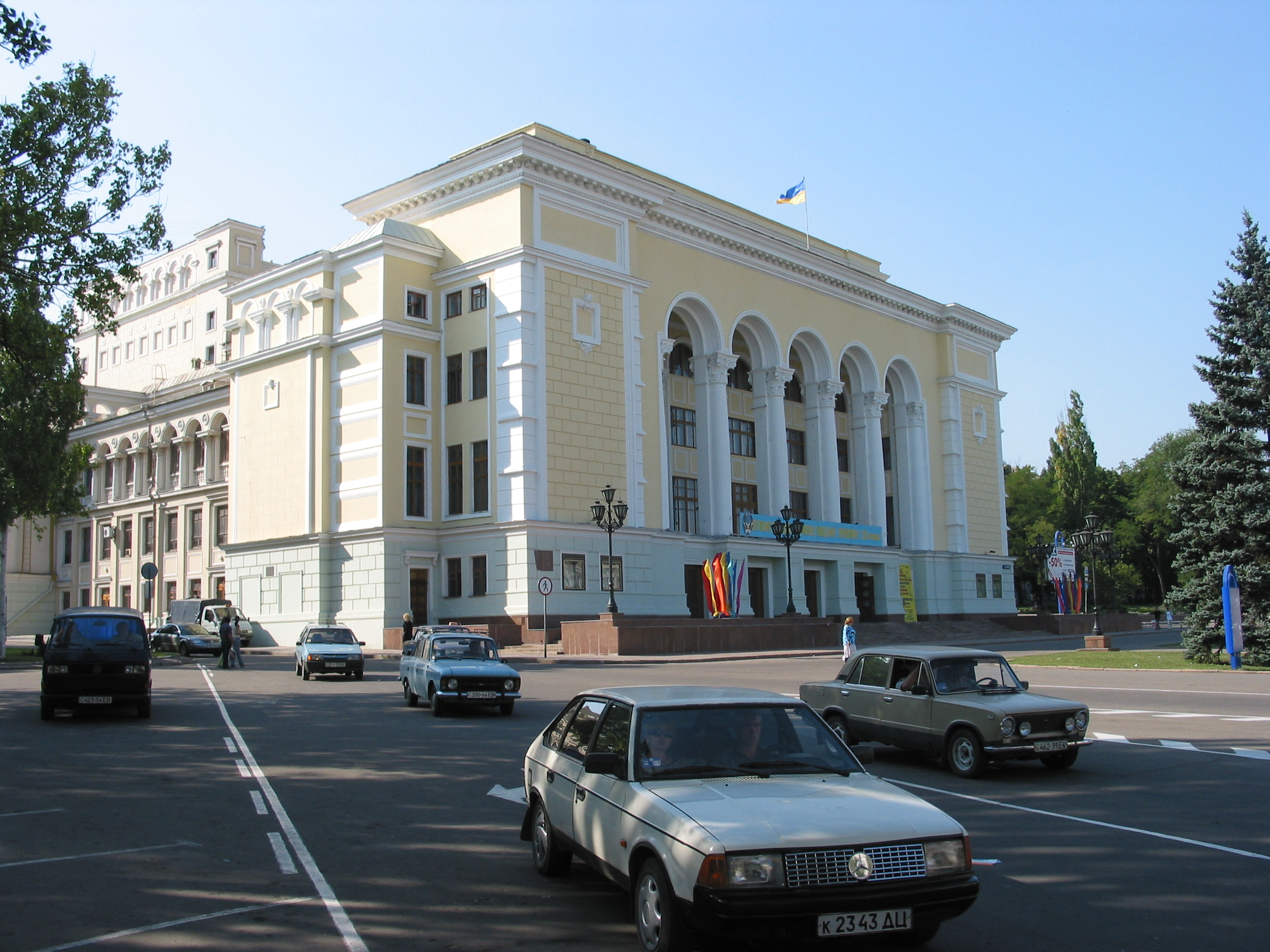
Donetsk Opera Theatre, 2002

==== Donbas Palace ====
This 5-star hotel in the center of Donetsk is the only ex-Ukrainian hotel to join The Leading Hotels of The World and was Ukraine's leading business hotel according to the World Travel Awards Association. It was built in 1938 by order of Shuvalova and Rechanikov. During the Nazi occupation of Donetsk, the Gestapo occupied the hotel as a headquarters; the building was partially destroyed during the war. The hotel was reopened after the reconstruction in 2004.

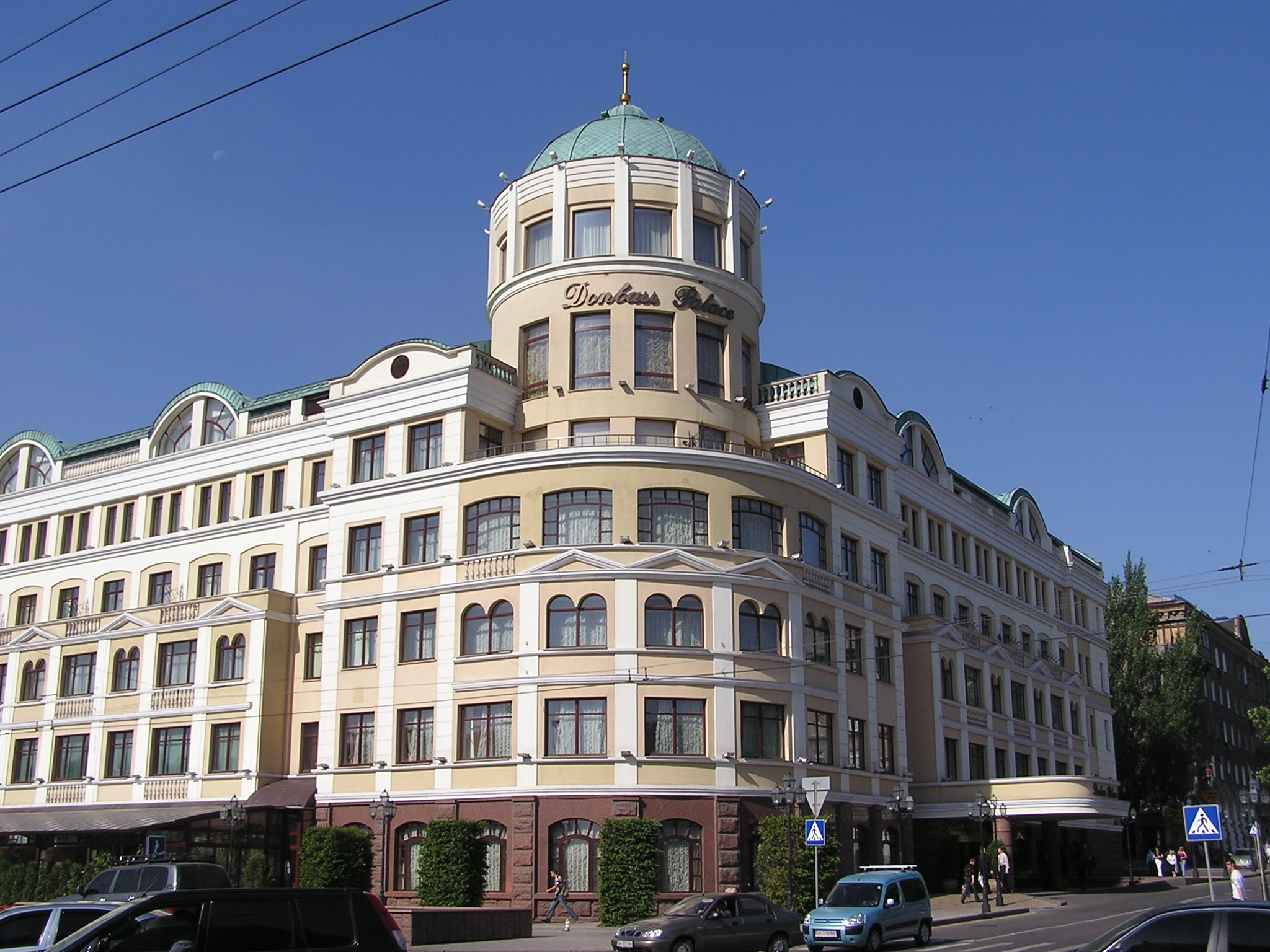
Donbas Palace, 2008

==== Pushkin Boulevard ====
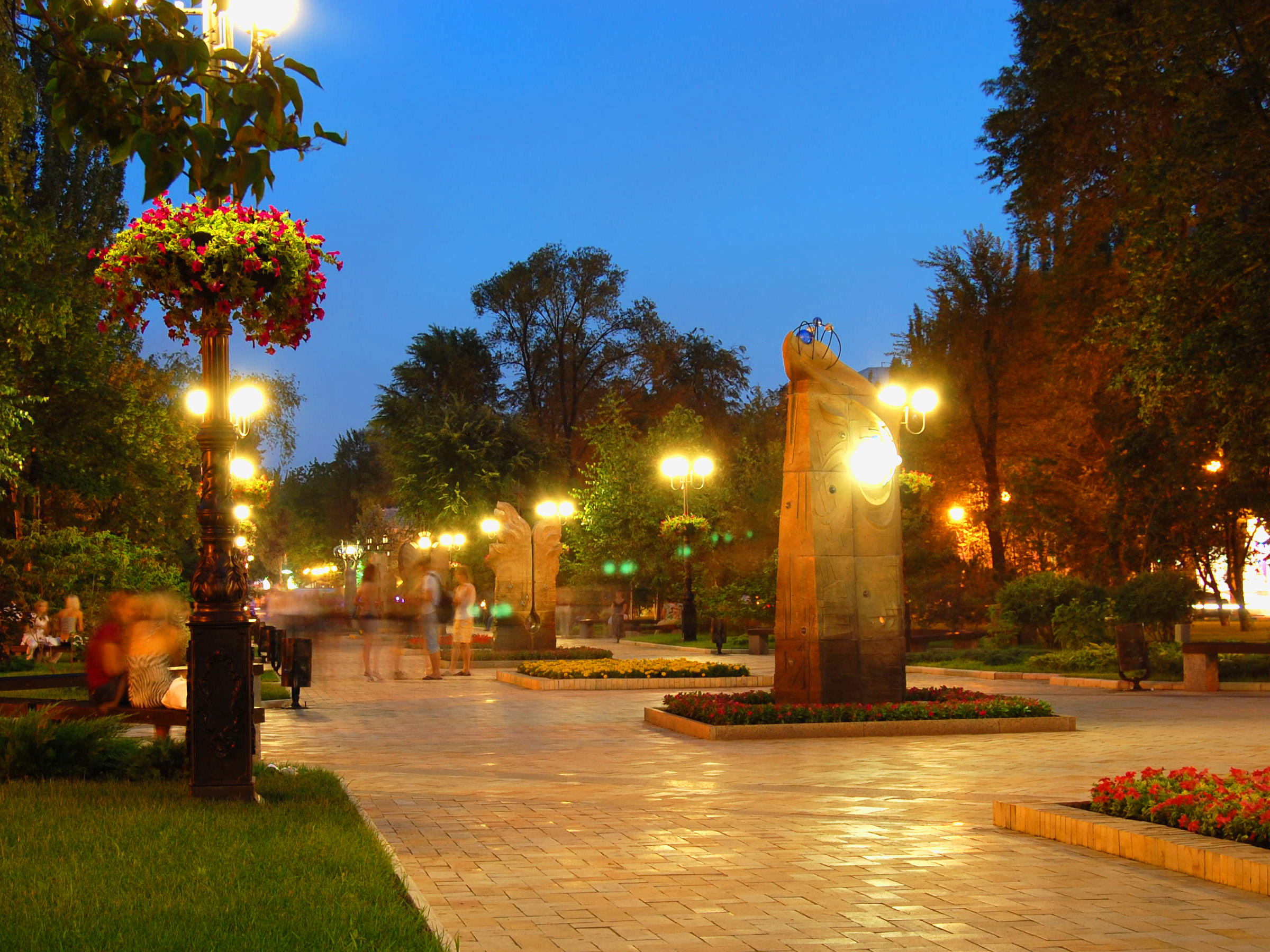
Pushkin Boulevard at night

A 2 km (1.24 mi) long greenway that features fountains, cafes, and a number of statues such as the monument to Taras Shevchenko. The Mertsalov Palm sculpture is also located on Pushkin Boulevard. Originally created for an exhibition in 1896 by Aleksei Mertsalov, a local blacksmith, out of a single rail, it was meant to represent the skills and power of the heavy industry in Czarist Russia.

==== Monument to John Hughes ====
This 2001 statue located in front of Donetsk National Technical University honors the work of Welsh city founder John James Hughes, who built the city's Yuzovka Steel Plant which gave Donetsk its industrial history.

==== Forged Figures Park ====
Forged Figures Park was opened in 2001. The International Smithcraft Festival takes place in the park every year. Some prize-winning works are gifted to the city and remain in the park, periodically increasing the number of sculptures.

==== Aqua park ====
Donetsk Aquapark "Royal Marine" was opened in Scherbakova Park in late 2012. The free-standing dome, made with an aluminum truss structure, is 26 metres (85 ft) high with a diameter of 85 metres (279 ft), and features a retractable design that slides open to reveal up to 50% of the structure to sunlight. The 5,700-square-metre (61,000 ft^{2}) aqua park, one of the largest indoor water parks in the world, was built by Canadian company OpenAire, Inc.

=== Architecture ===
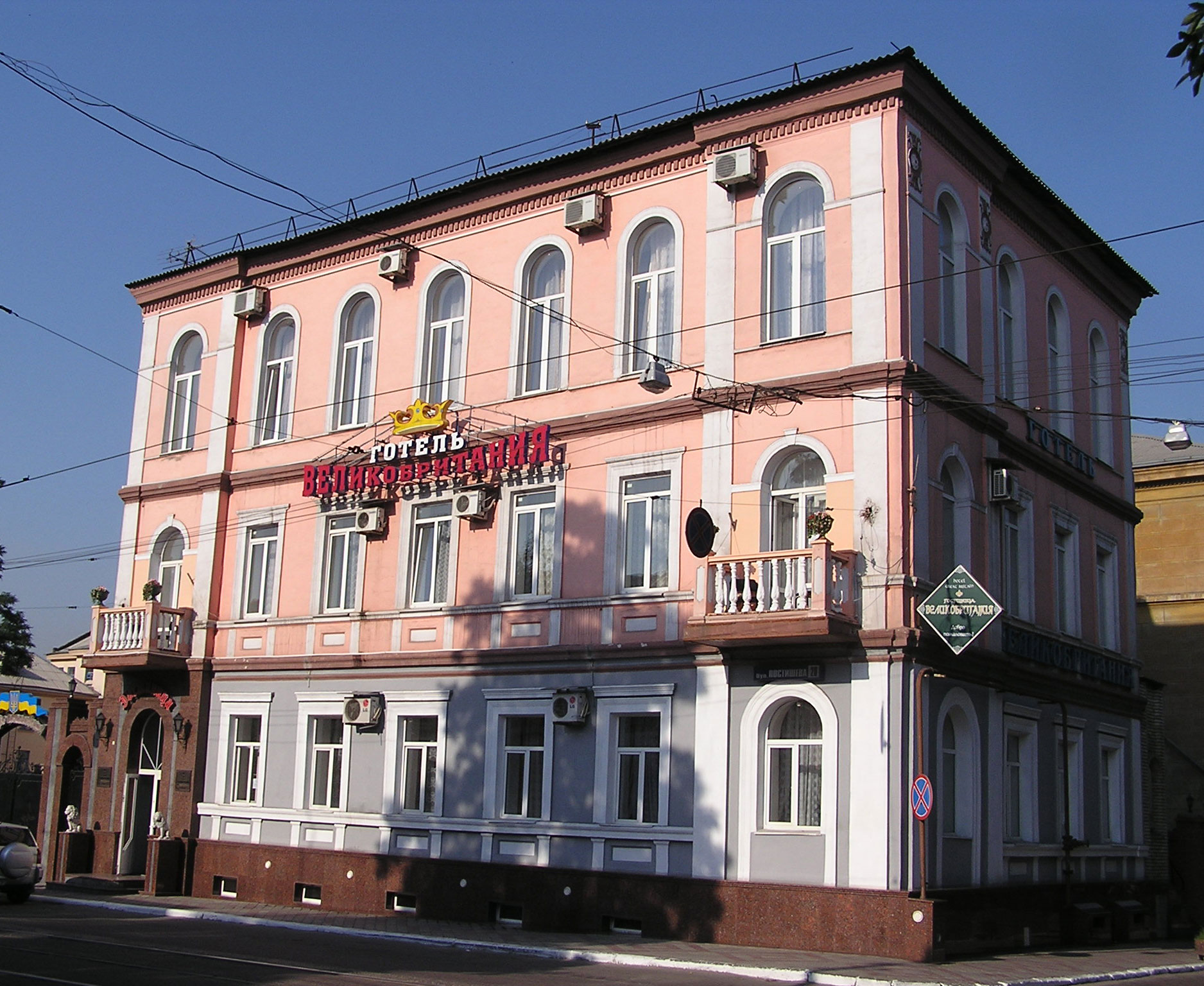
The Velikobritaniya (English: Great Britain) hotel is one of the oldest buildings in Donetsk, constructed in 1883.

Donetsk, at the time Yuzovka, was divided into two parts: north and south. In the southern part were the city's factories, railway stations, telegraph buildings, hospitals and schools. Not far from the factories was the English colony where the engineers and the management lived. After the construction of the residence of John Hughes and the various complexes for the foreign workers, the city's southern portion was constructed mainly in the English style.

These buildings used rectangular and triangular shaped façades, green rooftops, large windows, which occupied a large portion of the building, and balconies. In this part of the town, the streets were large and had pavements. A major influence on the formation of architecture in Donetsk was the official architect of a Novorossiya company — Moldingauyer. Preserved buildings of the southern part of Yuzovka consisted of the residences of John Hughes (1891, partially preserved), Bolfur (1889) and Bosse.

In the northern part of Yuzovka, Novyi Svet, lived traders, craftsmen and bureaucrats. Here were located the market hall, the police headquarters and the Transfiguration Cathedral. The central street of Novyi Svet and the neighbouring streets were mainly edged by one- or two-story residential buildings, as well as markets, restaurants, hotels, offices and banks. A famous preserved building in the northern part of Yuzovka was the Hotel Great Britain.

The first general plan of Stalino was made in 1932 in Odesa by the architect P. Golovchenko. In 1937, the project was partly reworked. These projects were the first in the city's construction bureau's history.

A large portion of the city's buildings from the second half of the 20th century were designed by the architect Pavel Vigdergauz, which was given the Government award of the USSR for architecture in the city of Donetsk in 1978.

=== Religion ===
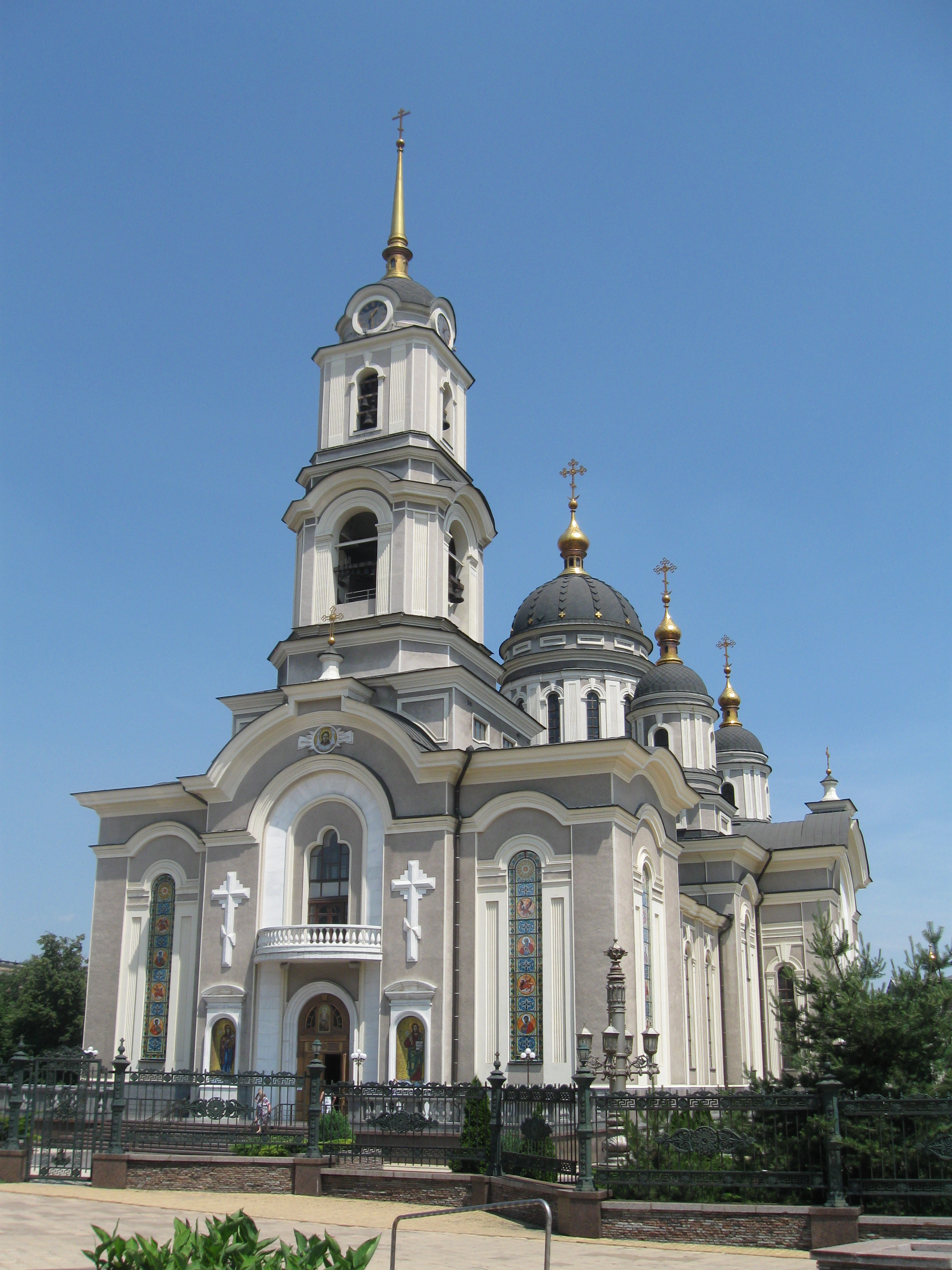
Transfiguration Cathedral

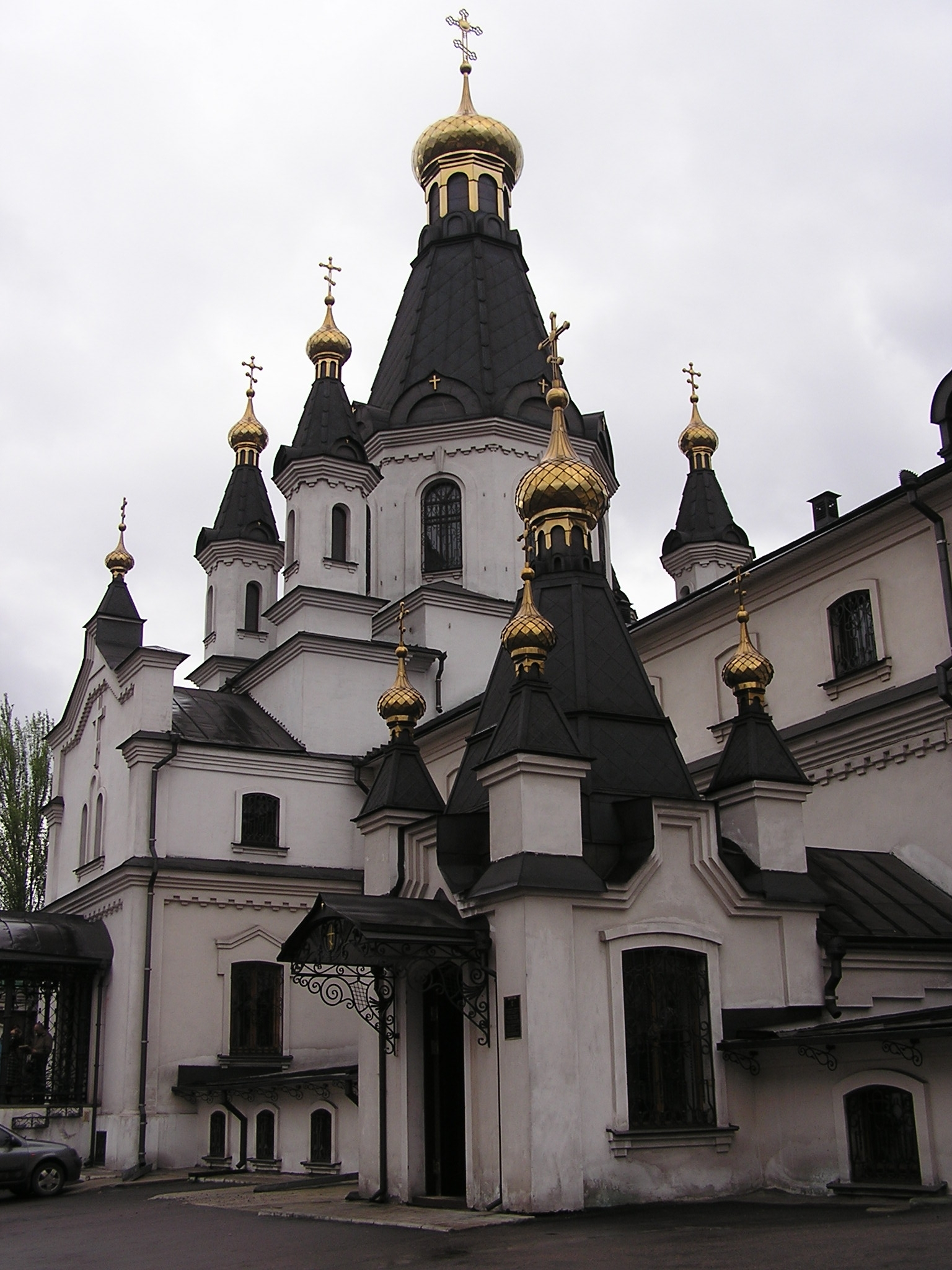
Saint Nicholas Cathedral

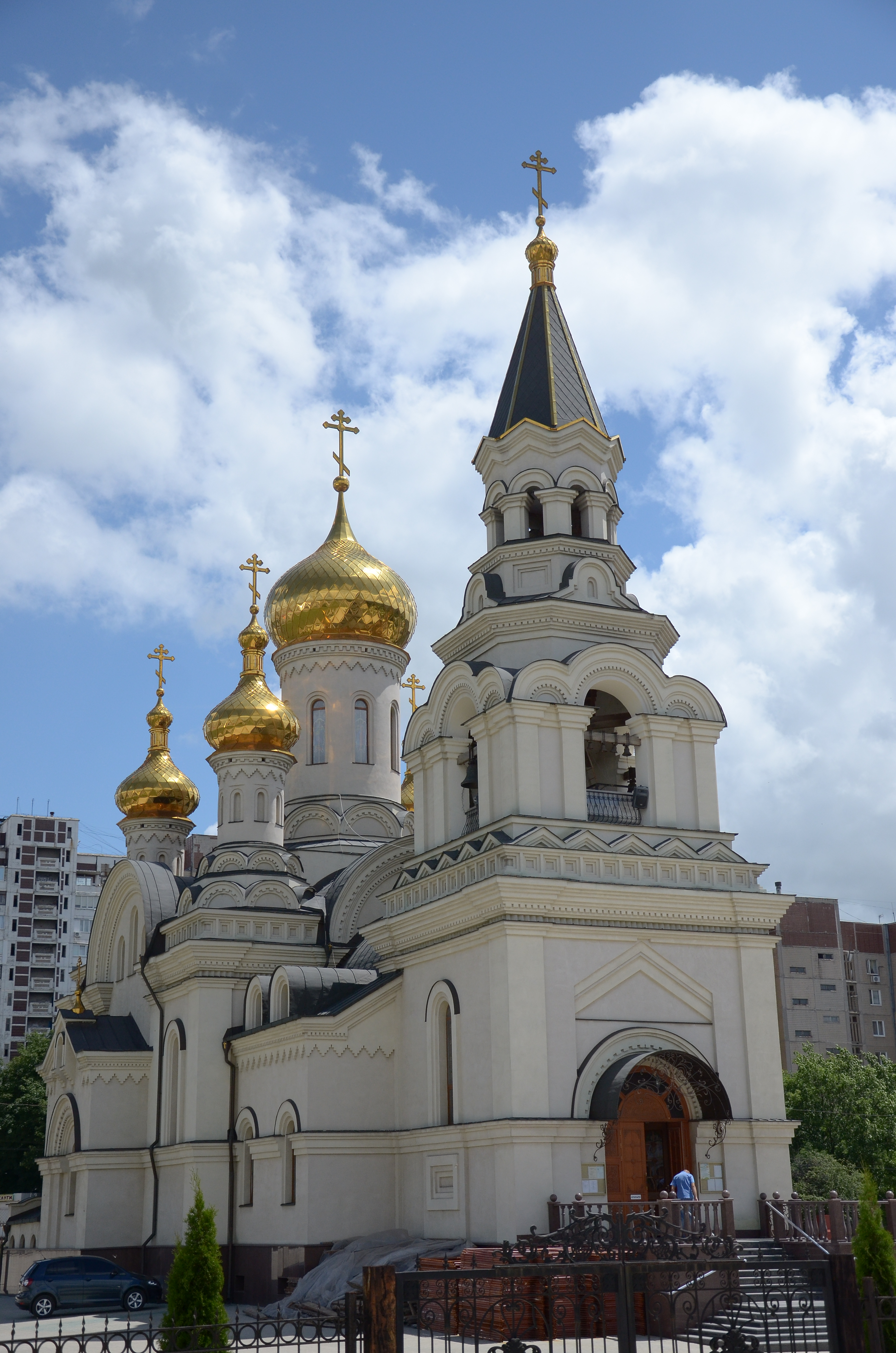
Holy Trinity Cathedral

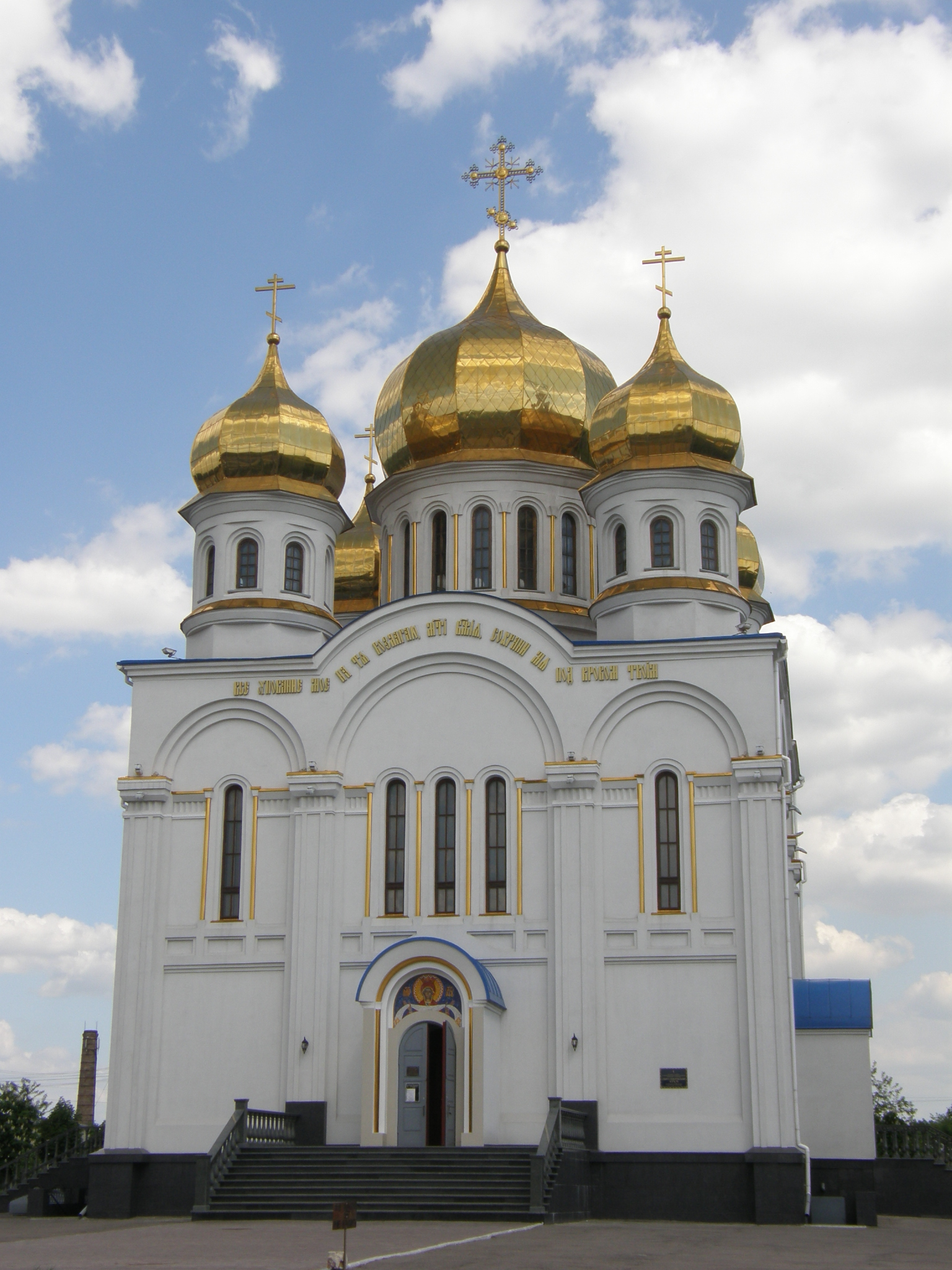
Church of the Intercession

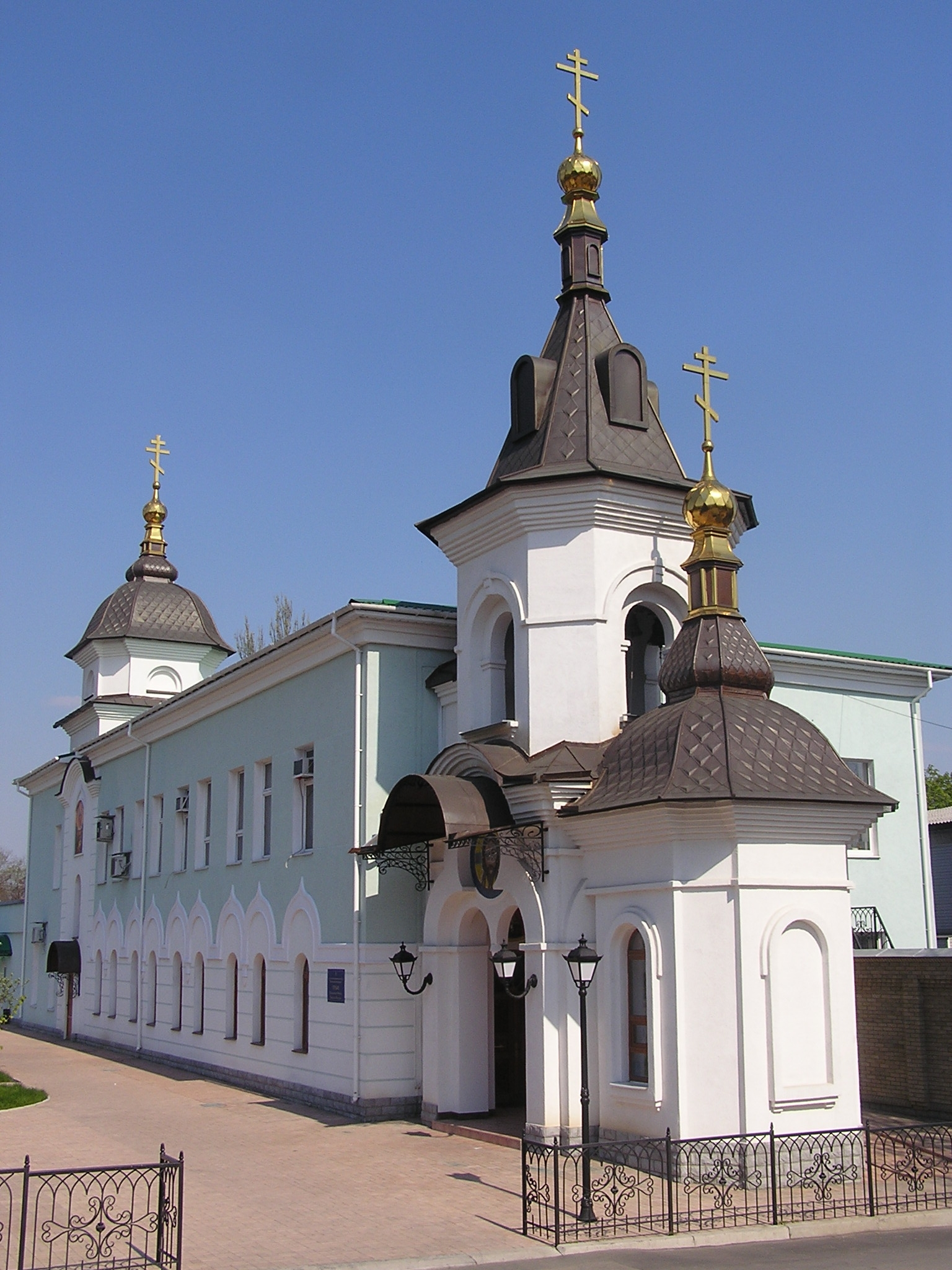
Church of the Pochayiv Icon

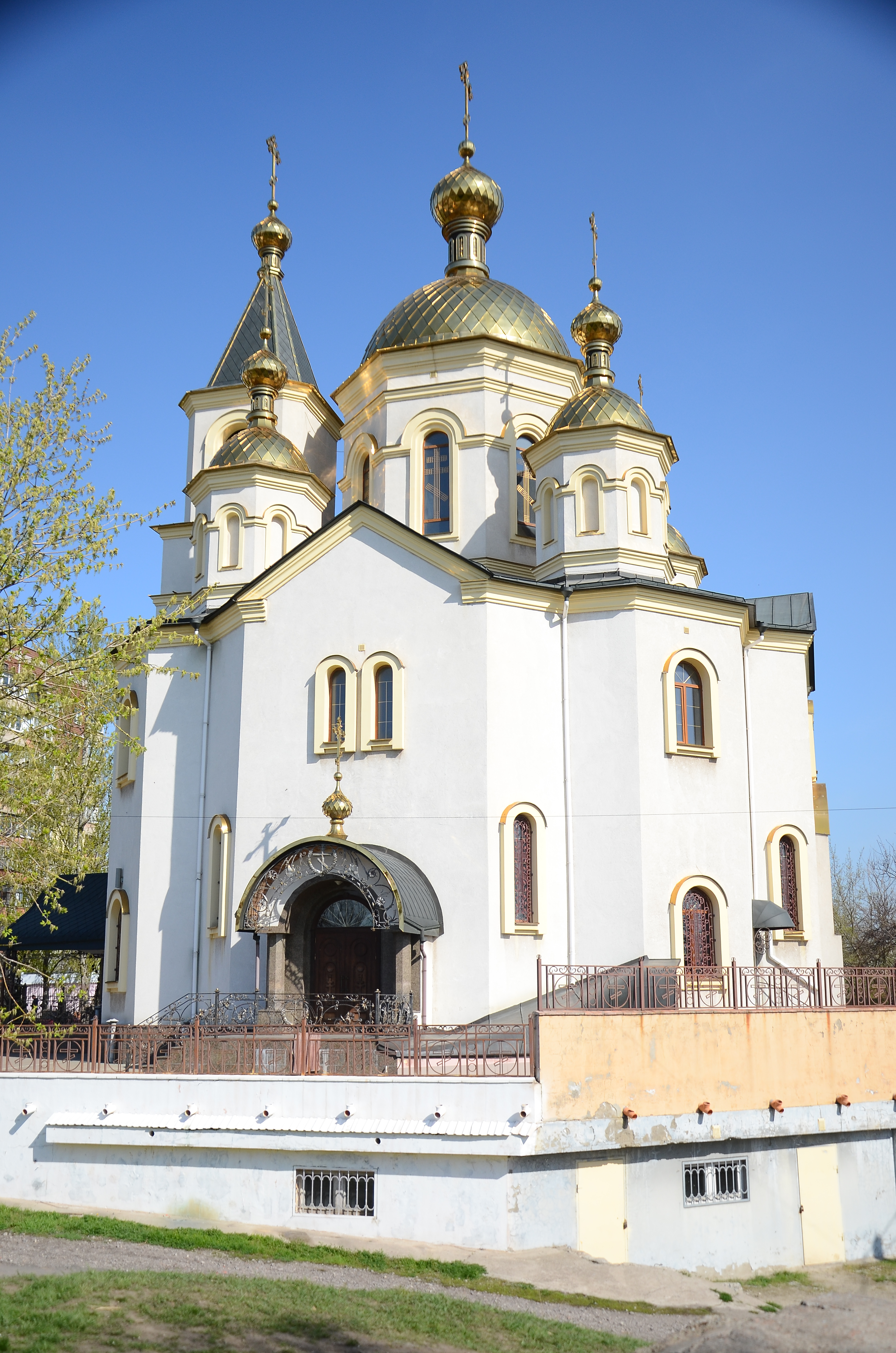
Church of Saint John the Baptist

Donetsk's residents belong to religious traditions including the Eastern Orthodox Church Eastern Catholic Churches, Protestantism, and the Roman Catholic Church, as well as Islam and Judaism. The religious body with the most members is the Ukrainian Orthodox Church (Moscow Patriarchate) and Ukrainian Orthodox Church of the Kyivan Patriarchate.

In 2014, a leaflet carrying the signature of the "Chairman of Donetsk's temporary government Denis Pushilin" was distributed to Jews on the festival of Passover. The leaflet asked Donetsk's Jewish citizens to register themselves, their property, and their families to the pro-Russian authorities. The leaflet claimed that failure to comply with its demands would result in the revocation of citizenship and confiscation of property. The leaflet prompted confusion and fear among Donetsk's Jewish population, who saw echoes of the Holocaust in the leaflet. Pushilin denied any connection with the leaflets and called them a provocation.

=== Media ===
Three television stations operate within Donetsk:

- First Municipal (Russian: Первый муниципальный)
- Kanal 27 (Russian: 27 канал)
- TRK Donbass (Russian: ТРК Донбасс)

The national Ukrainian channel Ukraina was first established in 1993 in Donetsk initially as a regional station there before broadcasting nationally in 2004. Donetsk served as Ukraina's first headquarters before it moved its headquarters to Kyiv in mid 2009.

In Donetsk, there is the 360-metre-tall (1,180 ft) TV tower, one of the tallest structures in the city, completed in 1992.

== Museums ==
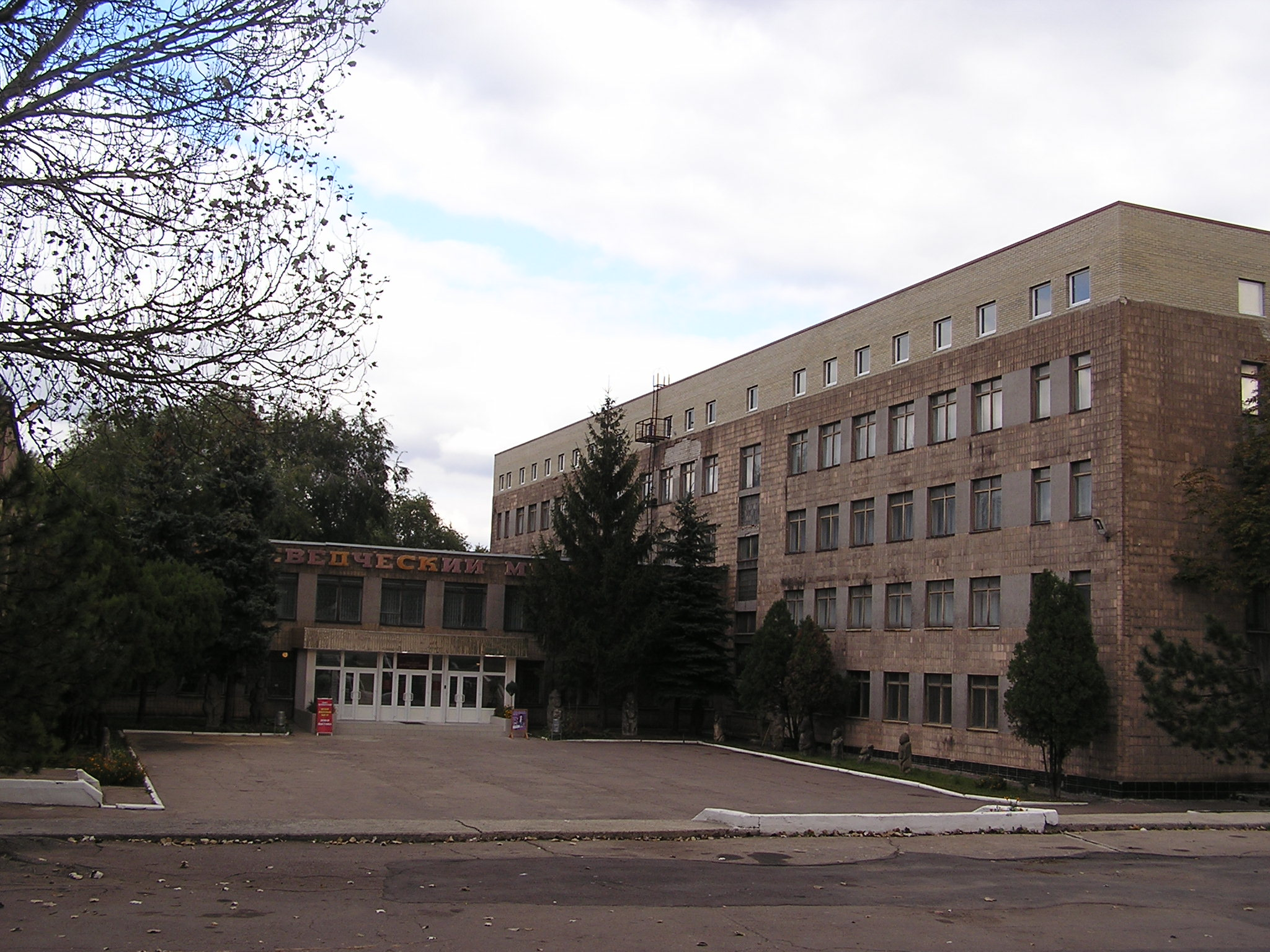
Donetsk Region History Museum

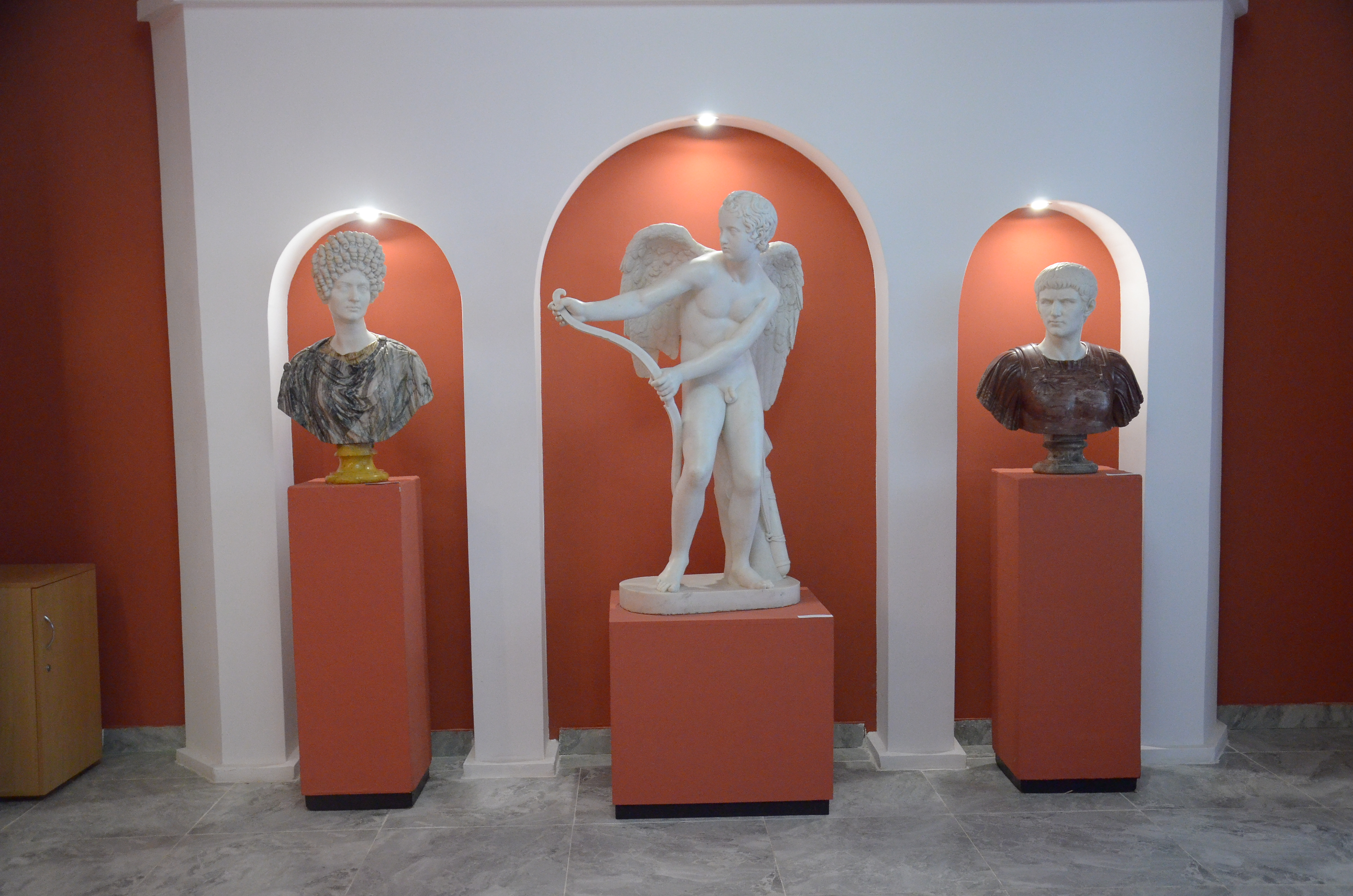
Donetsk Regional Art Museum

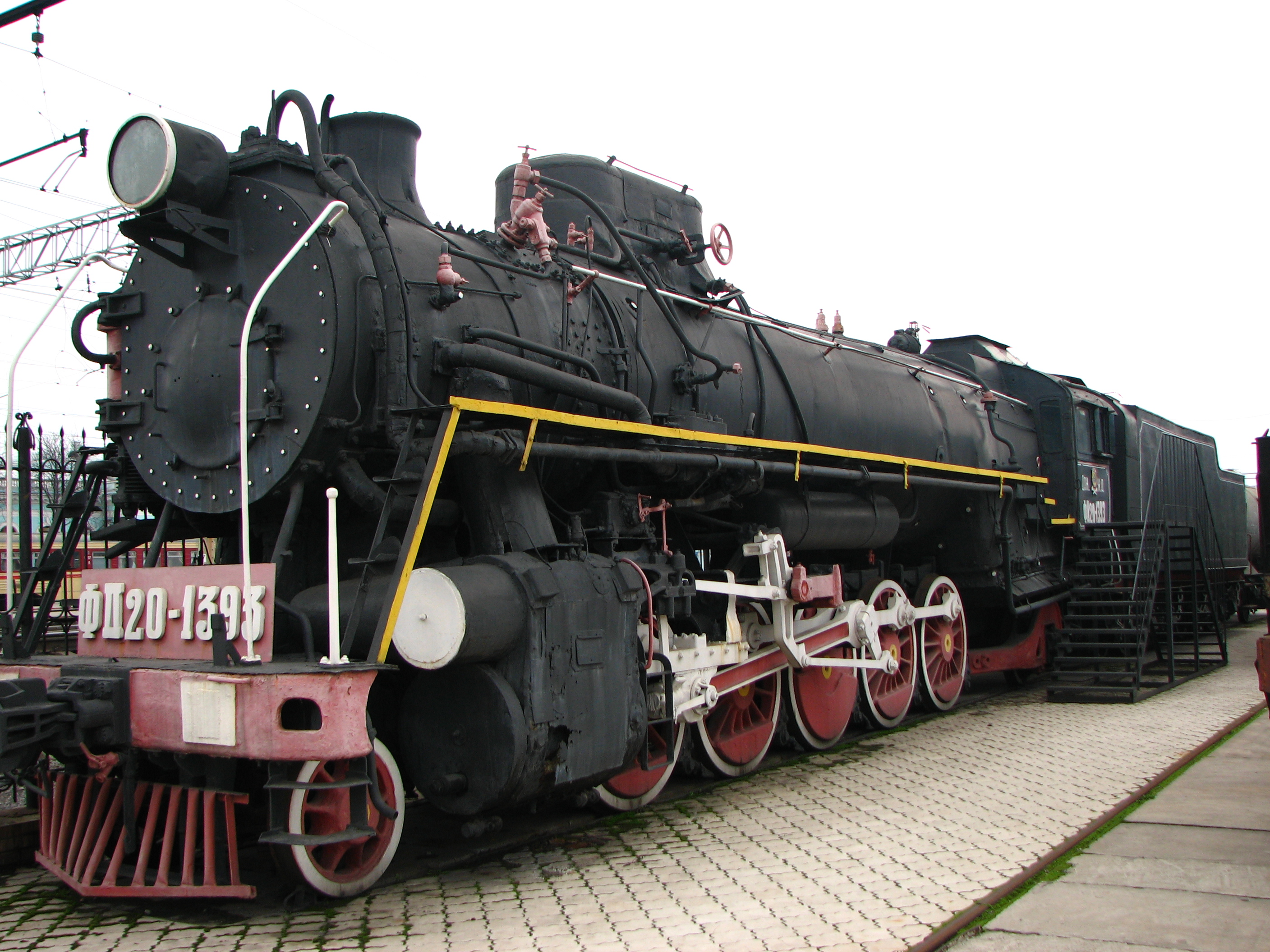
Museum of History and Development of Donetsk Railway

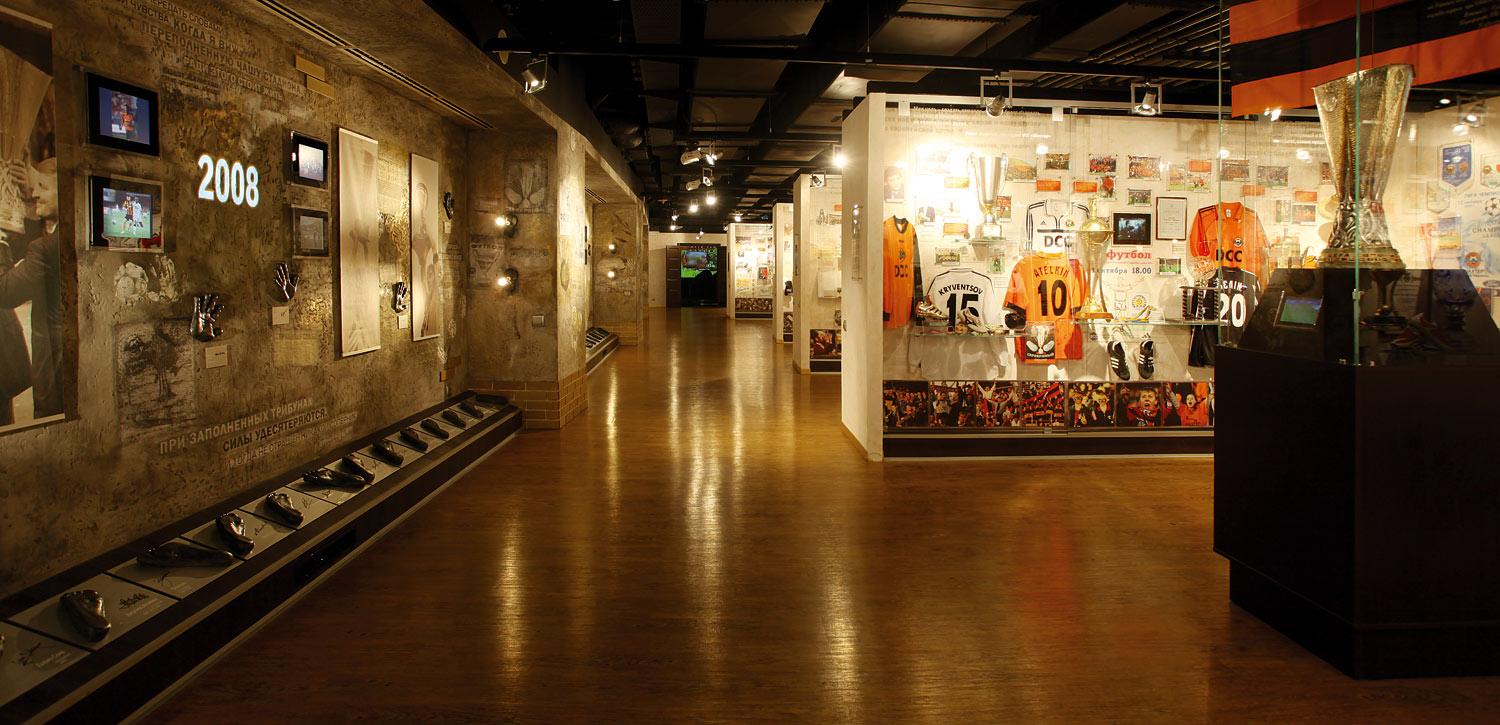
FC Shakhtar Museum

Donetsk is home to about 140 museums. Among them, two large regional museums – Donetsk Region History Museum and Donetsk Regional Art Museum.

Donetsk Region History Museum reveals the city's true identity and covers to the entire local community, diverse as it is. Set up in 1924, it offers an extensive expo with 120,000 exhibits: from archeological findings dating back to pre-historic times to the founding of the city by John Hughes, development of industry and coal mining, World War II and the Soviet times. On 21 August 2014, the mayor of Donetsk reported that the roof and walls of the Donetsk Regional History Museum had been destroyed by shellfire early that morning.

FC Shakhtar Museum was opened in 2010. This museum was the first Ukrainian museum to be nominated for a European Museum of the Year Award.

== Transport ==
=== Local transport ===
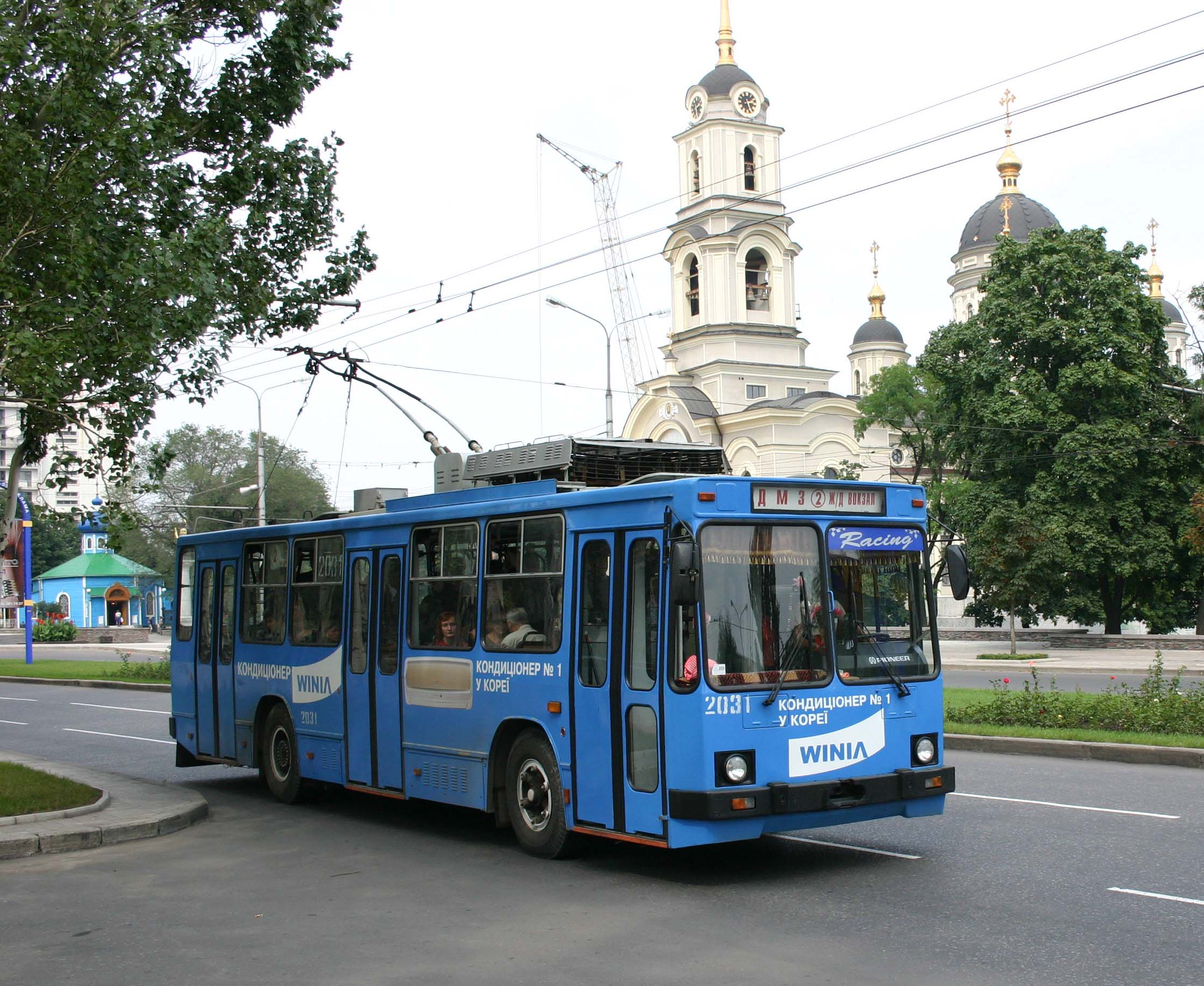
A Donetsk trolleybus with the Transfiguration Cathedral in the background

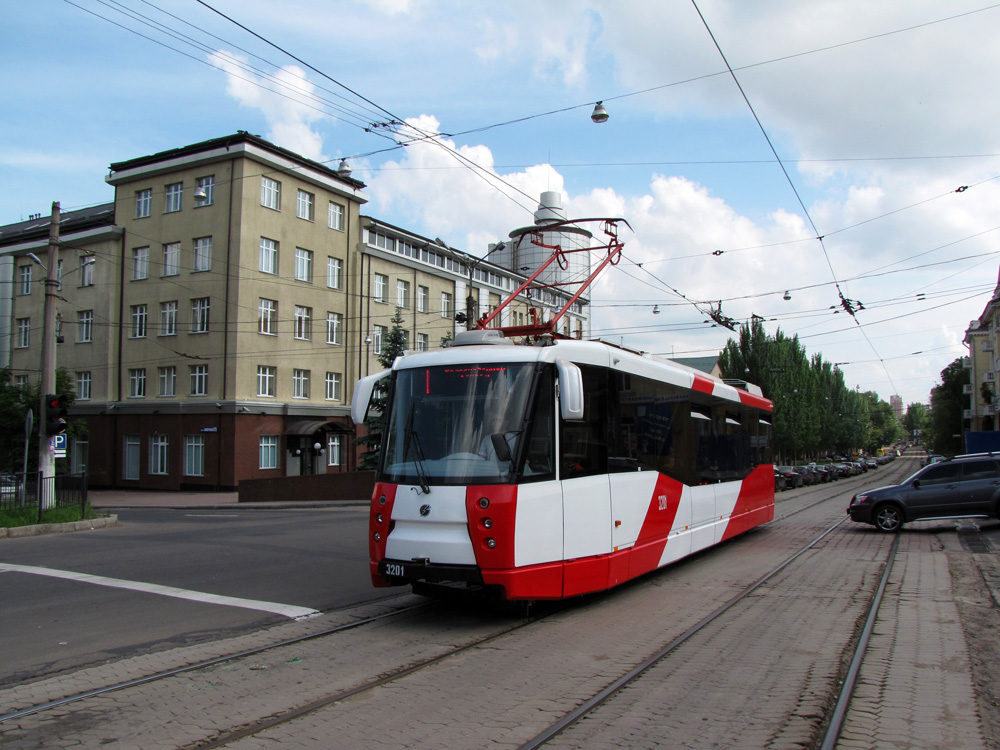
Tram LM-2008

The main forms of transport within Donetsk are: trams, electric trolley buses, buses and marshrutkas (private minibusses). The city's public transport system is controlled by the united Dongorpastrans municipal company. The city has 12 tram lines (~130 km), 17 trolley bus lines (~188 km), and about 115 bus lines. Both the tram and trolley bus systems in the city are served by 2 depots each. Another method of transport within the city is taxicab service, of which there are 32 in Donetsk.

The city also contains railway stations located within the city and its suburbs: railway station Yuzhny (South), which serves mainly transport lines to the south, hence its name; railway station Tsentr (Centre), which serves transport in the direction of Marinka and Vuhledar as well as intercity transport; the railway station Krytyi rynok (Indoor market), which serves mainly transport in the north and east directions; and the railway station Putilovsky, which serves mainly the north and northwest transport directions.

The construction of the metro system in the city, begun in 1992, was abandoned in 2012 due to the lack of funding. No lines or stations have been finished.

=== Railways ===
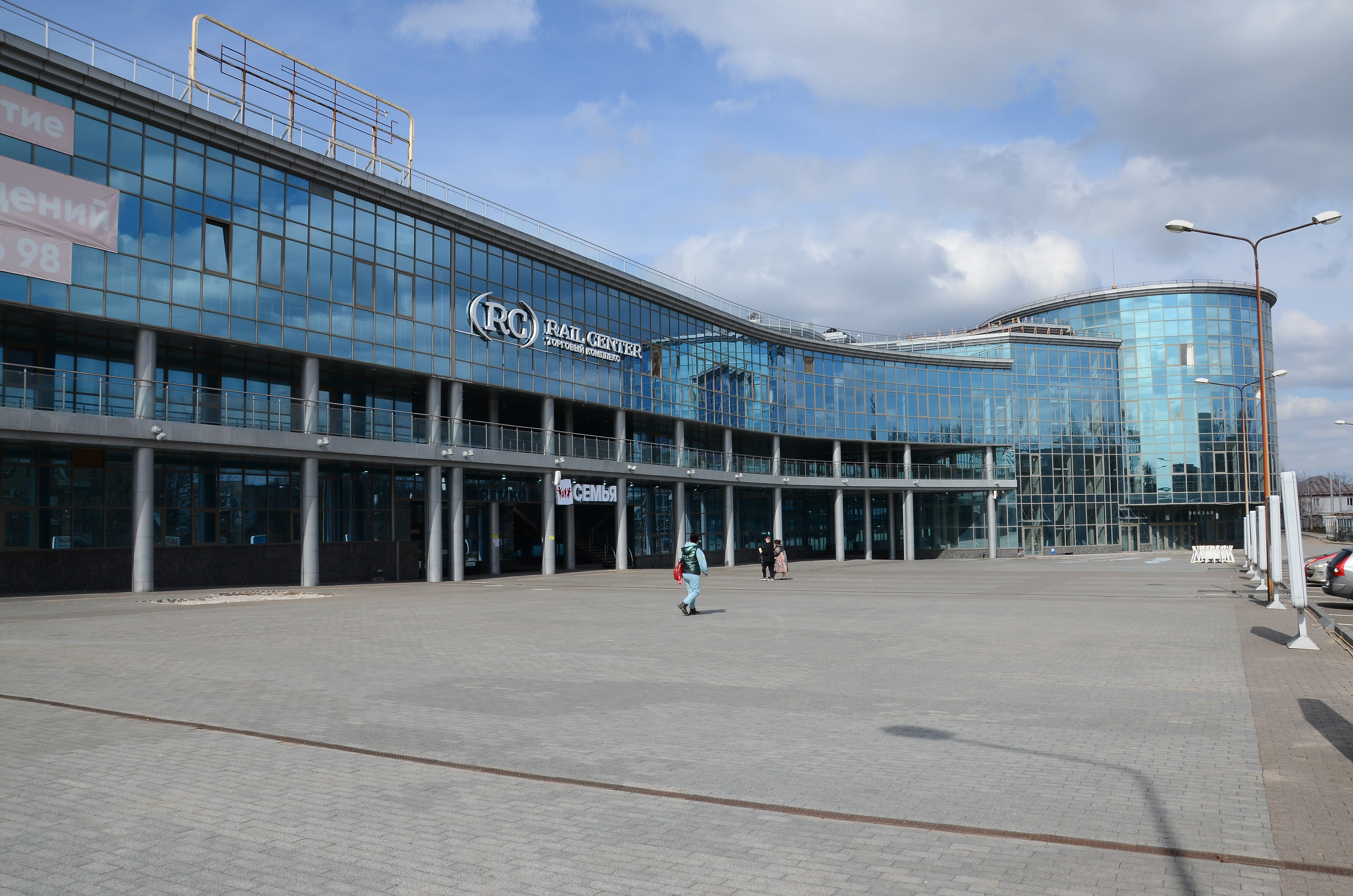
Donetsk's main railway station in 2025, located in the north of the city

Donetsk's main railway station, which at the beginning of the 21st century served about 7 million passengers annually, is located in the northern part of the city. There is a museum near the main station, dealing with the history of the region's railways. Other railway stations are: Rutchenkovo, located in the Kyivskyi District; Mandrykino (Petrovskyi District), and Mushketovo (Budonnivskyi District). Some passenger trains avoid Donetsk station and serve the Yasynuvata station, located outside the city limits. Although not used for regular transport, the city also has a children's railway. As of September 2009, a new railway terminal facility to comply with UEFA requirements (since Donetsk was one of the host cities for UEFA EURO 2012) was planned.

The Donetsk Oblast was an important transport hub in Ukraine, so was its centre Donetsk. The Donetsk Railways, based in Donetsk, was the largest railway division in the region. After the area was annexed by Russia, the Railways of Novorossiya, a state-owned railway company headquartered in Donetsk, has managed infrastructure and has operated freight and passenger train services in Donetsk People's Republic, Luhansk People's Republic, and Russian-controlled areas of Kherson and Zaporizhzhia Oblasts.

=== Road transport ===
The highway, part of the International E-road network, runs through the city en route to Rostov-on-Don in Russia.

In addition, another international road runs through the city: the M 04. Also, three national Ukrainian roads (N 15, N 20, and N 21) pass through the city.

The construction of the fourth stage of a circular road bypassing Donetsk was to be completed in 2014.

=== Air travel ===
In addition to public and rail transport, Donetsk used to have an international airport. It was constructed during the early 1940s and early 1950s. It was rebuilt in 1973 and again from 2011 to 2012. Because of fighting the airport has been closed as of 26 May 2014 and the airport has since then largely been destroyed. The airspace above Donetsk has also been closed since the MH17 disaster.

== Education ==
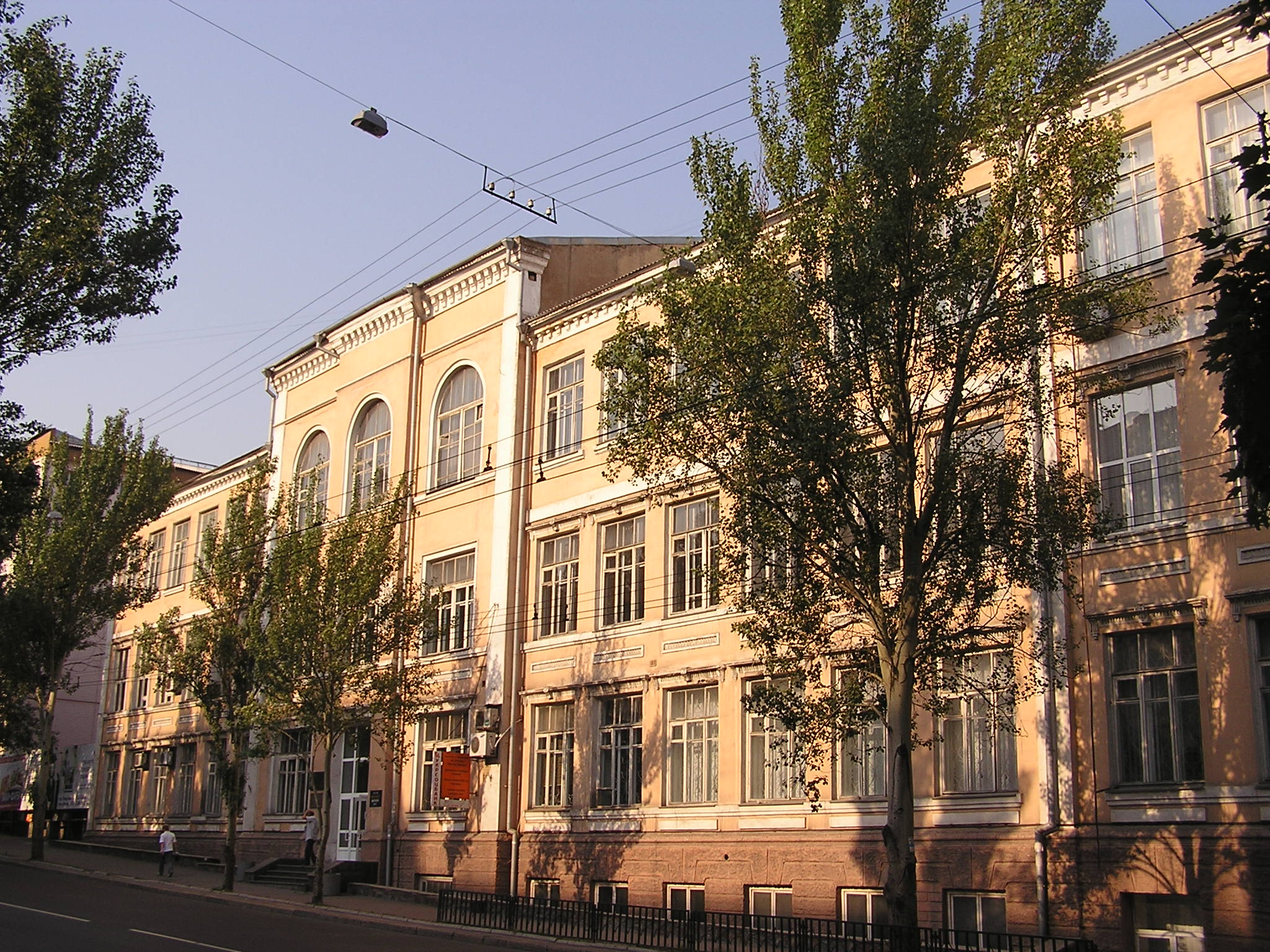
Donetsk National Technical University

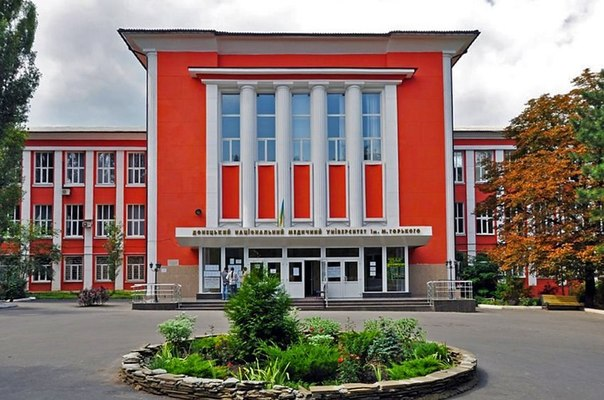
Donetsk National Medical University

Donetsk has several universities, which include five state universities, 11 institutes, three academies, 14 tekhnikums, five private universities, and six colleges.

The most important and prominent educational institutions include Donetsk National Technical University, founded in 1921 ("Donetsk Polytechnical Institute" in 1960–1993), as well as the Donetsk National University which was founded in 1937. The National Technical University held close contacts with the university in Magdeburg. Since 1970, more than 100 students from Germany (East Germany) have completed their higher education at either one of the two main universities in Donetsk. Donetsk is also the home of the Donetsk National Medical University, which was founded in 1930 and became one of the largest medical universities in the Soviet Union. There are also several scientific research institutes and an Islamic University within Donetsk.

Donetsk is also the home of the Prokofiev Donetsk State Music Academy, a music conservatory founded in 1960.

== Notable people ==
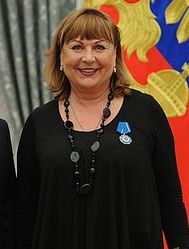
Tatyana Kravchenko, 2014

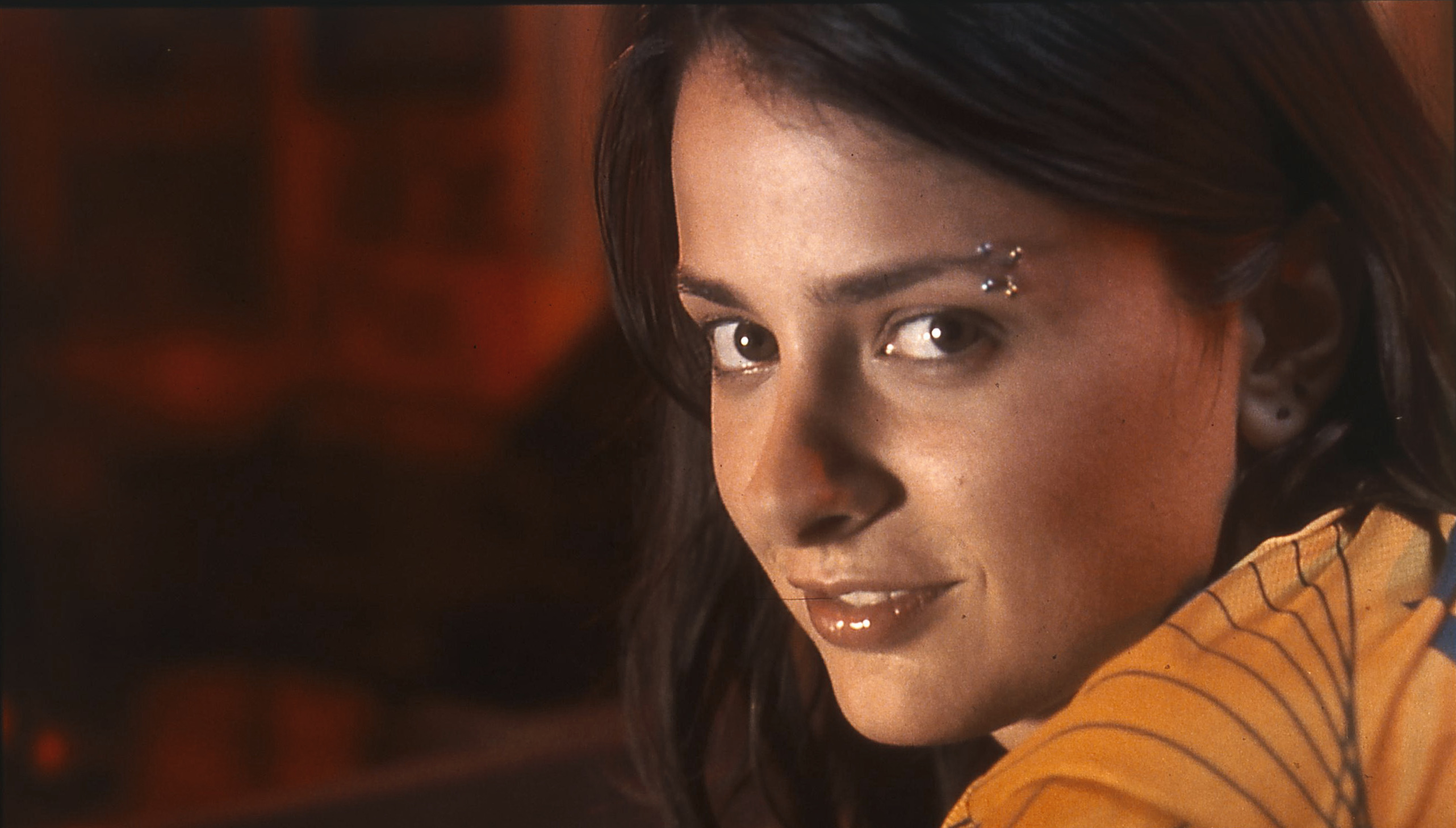
Siouzana Melikián, 2007

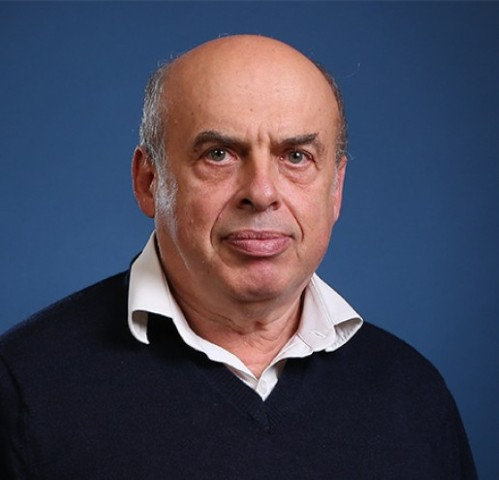
Natan Sharansky, 2019

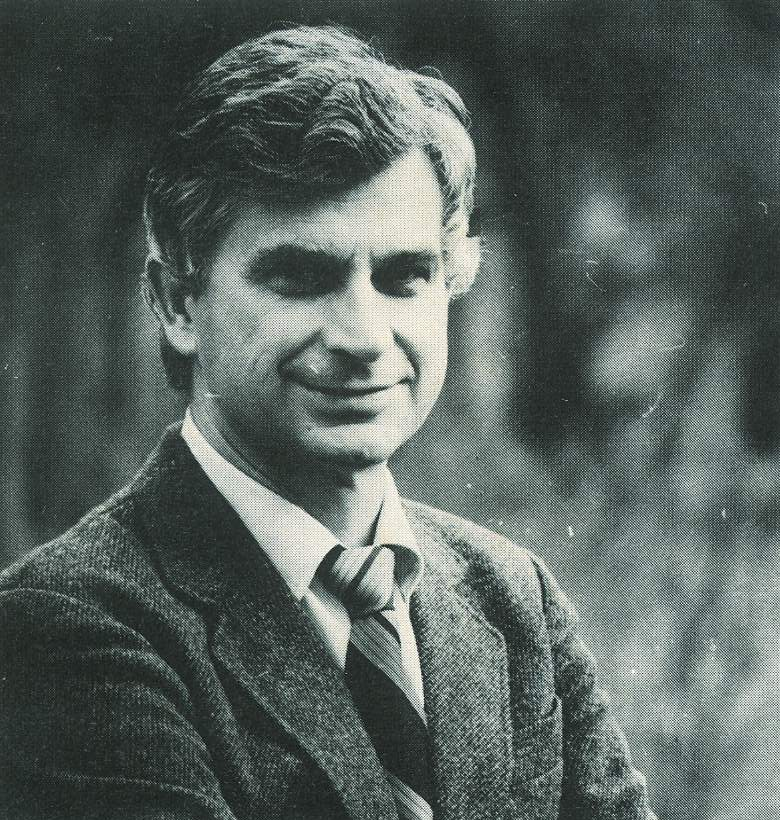
Anatoliy Solovianenko, 1984

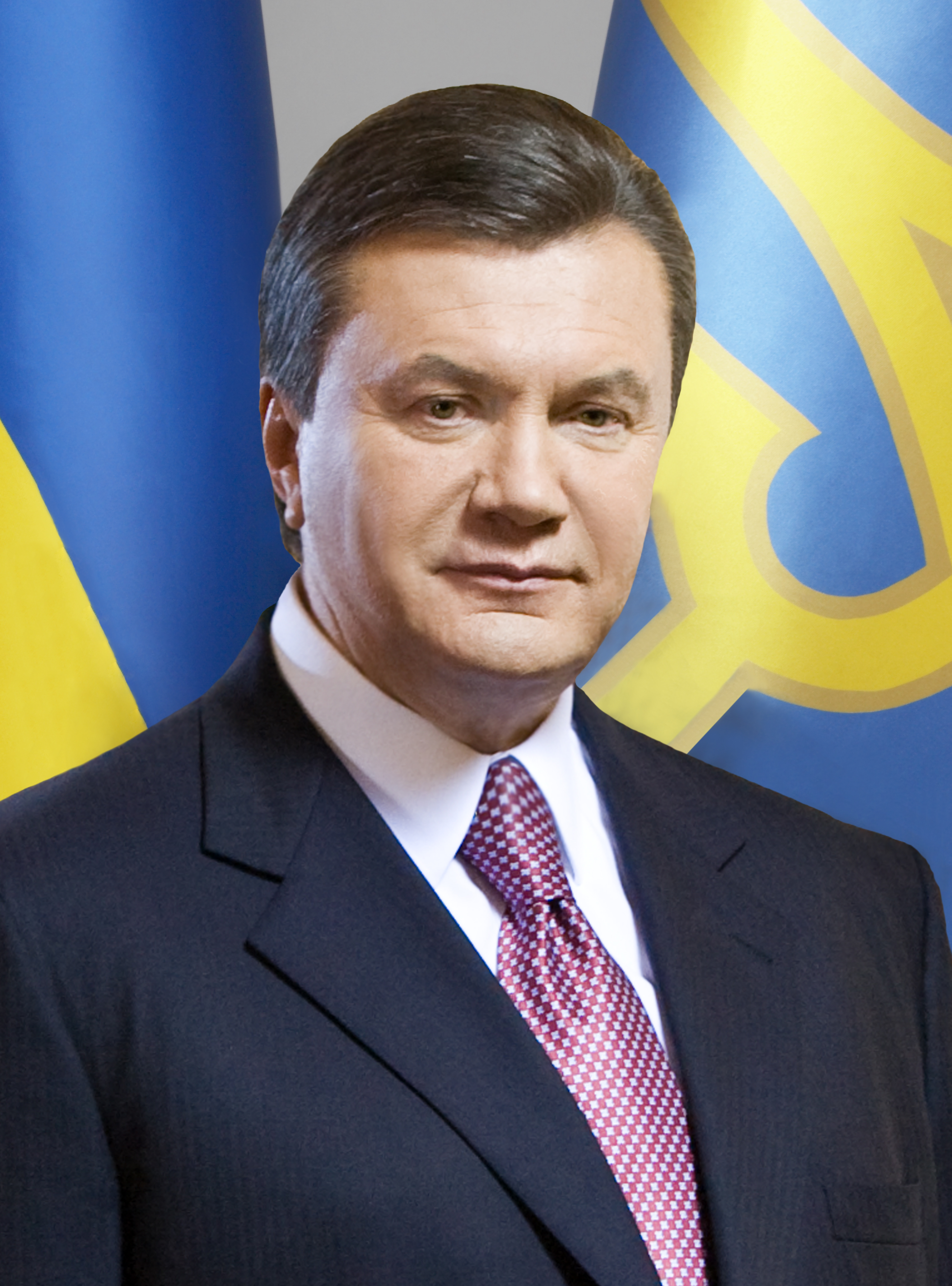
Viktor Yanukovych, 2010

The citizens of Donetsk are commonly called Donchyani (Ukrainian: дончани, Russian: дончане). The following is a list of famous people who were born or brought up in the city:

- Rinat Akhmetov (born 1966), a Ukrainian billionaire businessman
- Emma Andijewska (born 1931), a modern Ukrainian poet, writer and painter
- Alexander Anoprienko (born 1957), Professor of Computer Engineering in Donetsk
- Zalman Aran (1899–1970) a Zionist activist, educator and Israeli government minister
- Serhiy Arbuzov (born 1976), head of Ukrainian Bank, 2010–2012
- Mykola Azarov (born 1947), Prime Minister of Ukraine, 2010 to 2014
- Fyodor Berezin (born 1960), a Russian science fiction writer and active supporter of the Donetsk People's Republic
- Volodymyr Biletskyy (born 1950), a Ukrainian mining engineer and scientist
- Viktor Burduk (born 1957), artist and blacksmith
- Janina Dziarnowska (1903–1992), Ukrainian born Polish writer and translator, publicist, and expert on Soviet literature
- Vera Filatova (born 1982), a Ukrainian British actress
- Anatoly Fomenko (born 1945), mathematician, academic and promoter of New Chronology
- Dmytro Gnap (born 1977), journalist, investigates corruption
- Ismail Abdullaiev (born 23 May 1966), pro-Russian television director
- Yuri Kara (born 1954), Russian film director, screenwriter and producer
- Yevgeny Khaldei (1917–1997), Red Army naval officer and Soviet photographer
- Nikita Khrushchev (1894–1971), Premier of the Soviet Union 1953–1964, grew up in Yuzovka
- Iya Kiva (born 1984), Ukrainian poet, translator, journalist, critic
- Valeriy Konovalyuk (born 1966), economist and businessman
- Anna Korsun (born 1986), Ukrainian singer, pianist, organist, conductor and composer
- Serhiy Kozyr (born 1984), Ukrainian politician and Governor of Kherson Oblast
- Tatyana Kravchenko (born 1953), Soviet and Russian actress
- Mikhail Krichevsky (1897–2008), WW I veteran who fought for the Russian Empire
- Alexander Kuzemsky (born 1944), Soviet and Russian theoretical physicist
- Make Me Famous (2010–2012), English language Metalcore band
- Oleksiy Matsuka (born 1983), Ukrainian journalist and corruption investigator
- Siouzana Melikián (born 1986), Russian-Mexican actress
- Vadym Pysarev (born 1965), Ukrainian dancer and art Director
- Aleksandr Revva (born 1974), stand-up comedian, TV host and voice actor
- Volodymyr Rybak (born 1946), Mayor of Donetsk and Chairman of the Verkhovna Rada
- Vladislav Rusanov (born 1966), Russian-language science fiction writer
- Denis Stoff (born 1992), Ukrainian musician, vocalist for Asking Alexandria
- Natan Sharansky (born 1948), former anticommunist, Zionist, Israeli politician and writer
- Ihor Sorkin (born 1967), former head of the Ukrainian National Bank
- Anatoliy Solovianenko (1932–1999), Soviet operatic tenor
- Oleg Stefan (born 1959), Soviet and Russian actor
- Vasyl Stus (1938–1985), Ukrainian poet and publicist and member of the dissident movement
- Petro Symonenko (born 1952), head of the Communist Party of Ukraine
- Kirill Tolpygo (1916–1994), Soviet physicist worked on condensed matter theory
- Marina Tsvigun (born 1960), religious sect leader, new age movement
- Viktor Yanukovych (born 1950), former president of Ukraine; deposed in 2014
- Pavlo Vigderhaus (1925–2013), Soviet architect, Monument to a Miner creator
- Vladimir Zakharov (1901–1956), Soviet composer and choir conductor

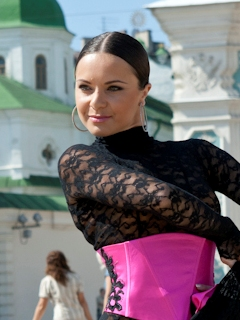
Lilia Podkopayeva, 2008

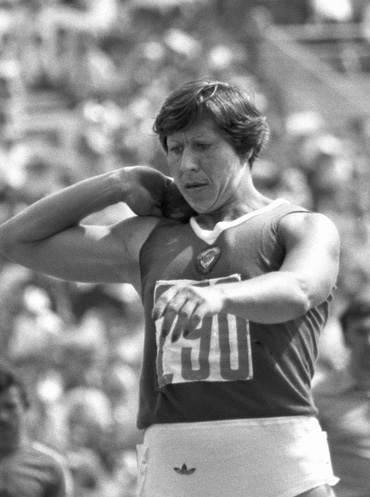
Nadezhda Tkachenko, 1980

=== Sport ===
- Polina Astakhova (1936–2005), Ukrainian gymnast, multiple Olympic medallist
- Serhii Bubka (born 1963), Ukrainian pole vault athlete; gold medallist 1988 Summer Olympics
- Yuriy Dehteryov (born 1948), goalkeeper, 321 caps with Shakhtar Donetsk and 17 with the USSR
- Yuriy Gavrilov (1967–2021), volleyball player, Olympic gold medallist
- Julia Glushko (born 1990), Israeli tennis player
- Yukhym Konoplya (born 1999), Ukrainian football player
- Aleksandr Lebziak (born 1969), Russian boxer
- Natalya Mammadova (born 1984), Azeri volleyball player
- Evgenij Miroshnichenko (born 1978), Ukrainian chess player
- Ilya Mate (born 1956), Soviet Ukrainian freestyle wrestler, gold medal at the 1980 Summer Olympics
- Mark Padun (born 1996), Ukrainian cyclist
- Oleksiy Pecherov (born 1985), a Ukrainian basketball player
- Lilia Podkopayeva (born 1978), a Ukrainian gymnast, and the 1996 Olympic All Around Champion
- Serhii Rebrov (born 1974), footballer with 425 club caps and 75 for Ukraine
- Olha Saladukha (born 1983), a retired Ukrainian triple jumper, currently serving as a People's Deputy of Ukraine
- Viktor Smyrnov (born 1986), Paralympic swimmer
- Viktor Sidyak (born 1943), fencing, first Soviet individual sabre Olympic gold medal in Munich 1972
- Nadiya Tkachenko (born 1948), Olympic-gold winning pentathlete
- Oleg Tverdovsky (born 1976), ice hockey player
- Oleg Verniaiev (born 1993), Ukrainian gymnast, Olympic gold medallist
- Alexander Yagubkin (1961–2013), 1982 World heavyweight amateur boxing champion

== Twinnings ==
Donetsk participates in international town twinning schemes. Partners include:

- Baku, Azerbaijan (2009)
- Bochum, Germany (1987)
- Charleroi, Belgium
- Katowice, Poland
- (Georgia (country)) Kutaisi, Georgia
- Matagalpa, Nicaragua (2004)
- Pittsburgh, United States
- Sheffield, United Kingdom
- Taranto, Italy (1984)
- Vilnius, Lithuania

== See also ==
- University Street, Donetsk

== Sources ==
- Kilesso, S. (1982). Donetsk. Architectural-historical summary. Kyiv: Budivelnyk. p. 152.
- "Partner-Portal — Everything about Donetsk". Partner-Portal (in Russian). Интернет-агентство «Партнер». Archived from the original on 11 August 2006.
