= Oleksandr Bobkov =

Russian-Ukrainian politician and businessman (born 1960)

- Олександр Бобков
- A portrait of him from 2012.

People's Deputy of Ukraine
- In office 12 December 2012 – 27 November 2014
- Constituency: Donetsk Oblast, No. 41

Personal details
- Born: Oleksandr Mikhailovich Bobkov; 18 April 1960 (age 66) Stalino, Ukrainian SSR, Soviet Union (now Donetsk)
- Party: Party of Regions (2004-2014)
- Education: Donetsk National University (1992, 2000)

Military service
- Allegiance: Donetsk People's Republic
- Years of service: 2015-2016
- Unit: Pyatnashka Brigade

Oleksandr Mikhailovich Bobkov (Ukrainian: Олександр Михайлович Бобков; Russian: Александр Михайлович Бобков; born 18 April 1960) is a Russian and formerly Ukrainian politician and businessman who served as a People's Deputy of Ukraine in the Verkhovna Rada representing the 7th convocation from 2012 to its premature end in 2014 with the Party of Regions. Previously, Bobkov was a long-time and influential politician in the city of Donetsk, having been considered part of "Yanukovych's family", and was chairman of the Party of Regions branch for the city from 2004 to 2010. In 2005, he fled to Russia as a result of a criminal case, only returning to Ukraine in 2010. After the start of the War in the Donbas, Bobkov sided with the pro-Russian Donetsk People's Republic, which he was heavily involved in creating.

== Early life ==
Bobkov was born on 18 April 1960 in the city of Stalino (now Donetsk), which was part of the Ukrainian SSR in the Soviet Union at the time of his birth. He is ethnically Russian and the son of Mikhail Petrovich and Alexandra Arsenivna. After graduating from secondary school, Bobkov worked as a transport driver for the Donetsk ATPs 21462 and 11462, before becoming chairman of the trade union "Motor Transport and Highway Workers" in 1986. The following year, in 1987, he started studying at Donetsk State University to become an economist in industrial planning. Meanwhile, he left his job as chairman in 1989 to focus full-time on studying, and so he graduated from Donetsk in 1992. After returning to the workforce, he became Deputy Director of Holding-Lada LLC until 1997, and then director of the subsidiary Budyonivskyi Kolkhoznyi Rynok until January 2002. Separately, he graduated as a lawyer from his alma mater, Donetsk State University, in 2000. After leaving Budyonivskyi in 2002, Bubkov then briefly headed the branch of the firm "Audit-Advocate-Ukraine", before being forced to resign in April 2002.

== Political career ==
=== 2002-2005: Early career in Donetsk ===
View of the Budonnivskyi District in Donetsk. From 2002 to 2010, Bobkov headed the local district.

In 2002, Bobkov first entered politics when he was appointed head of the Budonnivskyi District in Donetsk. During his chairmanship of the district, according to Kazan in How Ukraine Lost the Donbas, Budonnivskyi became well-known as one of the most crime-ridden districts of Donetsk, with Kazan even accusing Bobkov of being implicated in several high-profile murders, such as Illya Morozov, the head of the Communist Party of Ukraine (CPU) in the district. It was also said he heavily vied for the post of mayor after Oleksandr Lukyanchenko briefly became seriously ill, although the Donbas oligarch Rinat Akhmetov stopped Bobkov from becoming mayor in favour of his own candidates. In March 2004, Bobkov was elected head of the Party of Regions for its city branch in Donetsk. The position was previously held by the then deputy mayor of Donetsk, Oleksiy Rybalka. After becoming chairman, Bobkov became mostly known for holding massive rallies in support of Viktor Yanukovych, the head of the Party of Regions, during the Orange Revolution. During these rallies, Bobkov called the Central Election Commission of Ukraine (CEC's) overturning of Yanukovych's victory in the 2004 Ukrainian presidential election over widespread allegations of electoral fraud "unconstituional" and a decision that "violated the rights of citizens". Bobkov also accused the For United Ukraine! faction, the previous president Leonid Kuchma, and then Chairman of the Verkhovna Rad, Volodymyr Lytvyn, of betraying Yanukovych during the constitutional ruling. Bobkov also organised signatures in Donetsk for a referendum to be held on the decision of overturning Yanukovych's victory.

=== 2005-2010: Exile in Russia ===
In 2005, Bobkov spent a short bit of time in a pre-trial detention centre due to a criminal case related to him. He was eventually released, and afterwards Bobkov moved to the Russian capital of Moscow, while still being involved in elections in Ukraine in absentia and holding the chairmanship of the Donetsk regional branch of the Party of Regions. During the 2006 local elections, he was elected to the Donetsk City Council for its V convocation. During these elections, which were controversial, Bobkov initially put his people at the top of the list of the party list for the Donetsk City Council due to Borys Kolesnikov's absence after he was arrested, with Lukyanchenko and Akhmetov's men last. He also nominated himself to the post of Mayor of Donetsk during these elections. After Lukyanchenko called Kolesnikov, Kolesnikov demanded a re-vote, after which Bobkov's candidacy for the post of mayor for the Party of Regions was removed and he was put towards the bottom of the party list. After this, during a meeting with Yanukovych at the Shakhtar Hotel, some deputies with Bobkov's camps confronted Yanukovych and accused him of being disloyal to those who had supported him during the Orange Revolution, and of not having any intention to nominate Bobkov to hire posts.

After this, in 2008, Bobkov took part in the 2008 march "Donbas against NATO", which was organised by the Party of Regions at Lenin Square in Donetsk. He also helped found the Interregional Union of Medium-Sized Businesses in the Donbas, and was elected its president. Bobkov was eventually dismissed as chairman of the Donetsk branch of the Party of Regions in July 2010 and replaced by Lukyanchenko himself, although Kazan said Bobkov had held little effective power during his time due to Akhmetov. Bobkov himself was demoted to deputy head of the branch, and it was also confirmed he would oversee ideological issues for the branch.

=== 2010-12: Return to regional politics ===
In 2010, Bobkov finally returned to Ukraine after Yanukovych became president during the 2010 Ukrainian presidential elections. As a loyal member of "Yanukovych's family", he was thereafter given control of the LLC "Hromada", the garbage business for Donetsk. In September 2010, he was also elected to the Donetsk Oblast Council, thus forcing him to give up his mandate as head of the Budonnivskyi District in Donetsk (because Ukraine forbids dual mandates). He was No. 8 on the party list of the Party of Regions for the council. After getting onto the council, he was also elected Chairman of the Standing Committee on Investment Policy, Foreign Economic Relations, and Innovation, and was even proposed as one of five contenders for the chairmanship of the council by Andriy Shyshatskiy in 2011. During his time as chair of the standing commission, he criticised leaders who "remained in Soviet times", and said that Ukraine needed to reform after the Second Tymoshenko government. Specifically, he said that under the rule of Tymoshenko and Viktor Yushchenko from 2004 to 2010, Ukraine had "rolled back to the very last places in all world ratings", and said that Tymoshenko should have been imprisoned long ago. He also called Chernobyl (or Chornobyl) victims who were protesting pensions "provocateurs", and said they disrupted the work of the sessions of the Donetsk Oblast Council, even though they had been alloted pensions by the Yanukovych government. In June 2012, before entering national politics, he said the development of Ukraine depended on the status of the Russian language in Ukraine, and that Ukraine needed to be consistent in neighbourly relations with Russia.

=== 2012-14: Verkhovna Rada ===
Bobkov speaking the Verkhovna Rada in 2012.

During the 2012 Ukrainian parliamentary elections, Bobkov ran for a mandate in the Verkhovna Rada within constituency No. 41 representing the Party of Regions. At the time of its formation in 2012, the 41th district consisted of the Proletarskyi District and Budonnivskyi District, where Bobkov was largely considered heavily influential in. The total number of eligible voters in the constituency was 151,531 people. In the race for the constituency, he was opposed by Batkivshchyna candidate Volodymyr Derkach, who participated in the earlier hunger strikes of Chernobyl victims in Donetsk. In August 2012, Batkivshchyna reported that Derkach was being "politically persecuted", and he was accused of forgery of documents on allegations that he was not actually a victim of Chernobyl. His other major opponents were Pavlo Skakun, a member of the Communist Party of Ukraine (CPU), and Artem Zayarnyi, a member of the Ukrainian Democratic Alliance for Reforms (UDAR). However, Bobkov was easily elected to the Rada, winning in a landslide victory with 80.85% of the vote (92,239 people). In second was the CPU candidate at 10.17%, and in third was the Batkivshchyna candidate at 4.55%. After taking office, he joined the Party of Regions faction and was appointed Deputy Chairman of the Committee on Construction, Urban Planning and Housing.

In 2013, it was reported that Bobkov was to be considered as a candidate to replace Volodymyr Rybak as Chairman of the Verkhovna Rada, but this did not happen. After the subsequent outbreak of Euromaidan protests in November 2013 following Yanukovych's decision to not sign the European Union–Ukraine Association Agreement, Bobkov's power in parliament sharply dropped alongside Yanukovych's. In December 2013, he, alongside with 12 other Party of Regions members, proposed to create a group in the Rada with the participation of European politicians to help solve the Euromaidan protests. Along with the rest of the party line, Bobkov voted against the recognition to condemn the deaths of civilians as Euromaidan protests erupted, and he voted for the so-called "laws on dictatorship", which greatly curbed the rights to protest and free speech. In the spring of 2014, he also helped found the Donetsk branch of the Oplot organisation, which was led by Yevhen Zhylin in Kharkiv.

=== War in the Donbas ===
Protestors after seizing the Donetsk RSA building in April 2014. Bobkov supported the protests, and was heavily involved in the creation of the subsequent Donetsk People's Republic.

On 19 March 2014, together with other representatives of the pro-Russian movement in Donetsk, Bobkov headed a press conference at the Shakhtar Hotel, during which he called for a referendum on federalisation and the granting of autonomy to Donetsk Oblast. He also called on the new Ukrainian authorities, after Euromaidan succeeded, to fulfill the demands of the ongoing pro-Russian rallies in Donetsk, which he said were: the governor for Donetsk Oblast should be appointed locally, a law on a local referendum needed to take place, and Russian should be a second state language. A few days later, Bobkov said that Ukraine was collapsing as a country, and he said that "free states" needed to be created. Due to this, Bobkov was called the initiator of the idea to create the Donetsk People's Republic (DPR) and was called its "founding father". On 6 April 2014, pro-Russian protesters finally managed to seize the Donetsk Regional State Administration (RSA) building, after which they demanded an extraordinary session and the creation of a referendum, or they would create a "people's council". According to Bobkov himself in a later interview in 2016, he said he supported these actions and provided all possible assistance to the protestors in Donetsk. On the following day, 7 April, the protestors declared the creation of the pro-Russian, separatist Donetsk People's Republic and the creation of the 2014 Donbas status referendums for May, which was intended to legitimise the DPR and the other Russian-controlled separatist republic, the Luhansk People's Republic.

After the seizure, on 11 April, he held a meeting during which he said he had submitted a bill to the Verkhovna Rada called "On Local Referendums", which was supported by Oplot. After trying to push the bill on behalf of the Party of Regions, Borys Kolesnikov ultimately shot it down, which led to the start of the War in the Donbas. Meanwhile, the head of the militants for the DPR, Alexander Zakharchenko, who was called "Bobkov's man", continued to demand the adoption of the local referendum. After this, Bobkov said he would no longer remain a member of the Party of Regions, and became part of the "For Peace and Stability" group, which was considered a heavily pro-Russian group made up of MPs who were loyal to Yanukovych. During the summer, Bobkov left Kyiv despite his Rada mandate, when the War in the Donbas reached its peak in favour of the pro-Russian side. However, upon reaching the DPR, he was not given the title of Head of the DPR as he had hoped and as was widely expected; instead, it was given to his protege Zakharchenko. This was considered the effective end of his political career. In September 2014, the acting President of Ukraine, Oleksandr Turchynov, accused Bobkov of separatism and support for the DPR. In November 2014, he attended the inauguration of Zakharchenko as head of the DPR.

== 2014-present: Career in the DPR ==
After 2014, Bobkov moved to the business sector and became director of the Horlivka Coke Plant and the Donetsk Coke-Chemical Equipment Plant. He was also co-owner of Istek LLC, which was created in 2015 to control multiple enterprises within the Donbas, including the Horlivka Coke Plant, which he opened alongside Vladimir and Andriy Orlov (the latter is also a former deputy). Unlike many other enterprises in the DPR, Bobkov was allowed to retain control of both the Horlivka and Donetsk coke plants during the nationalisation era. In 2016, Alexander Khodakovsky, the paramilitary commander of the Vostok Brigade of the DPR, said in a blog that Bobkov had also become a company commander of the Pyatnashka Brigade. Khodakovsky said, though, that Bobkov's command was only nominal since he had never been part of the military, and said that it was likely that, despite this that he would receive "the star of the hero for righteous deeds". In 2017, it was reported that Bobkov would succeed Zakharchenko as the head of the DPR, although this also never happened. In response to the rumours, Bobkov said in September 2017 that he was not being considered to replace Zakharchenko and that he was actually in another country working on business projects.

== Personal life ==
He is married to Natalia Yurievna. Together, they have one daughter.

=== Sanctions ===
In March 2021, he was placed under the maximum amount of sanctions by the National Security and Defense Council of Ukraine for contributing to the strengthening of the "occupation regime in the Donbas".

== Honours and awards ==
Bobkov has been awarded the following honours:

- Pushkin Medal (2012, by Russia)

== Sources ==
- Казанський, Денис (2020). Як Україна втрачала Донбас [How Ukraine Lost the Donbas]. Книжкове видавництво Чорна гора.
