= Igor Martynov =

Igor Martynov may refer to:

- Yegor Martynov, Russian ice hockey player
- Igor Martynov (politician), Ukrainian politician
