= Coat of arms of Donetsk =

Versions
- Armiger: Alexey Kulemzin, Mayor of Donetsk
- Adopted: 5 July 1995; 31 years ago
- Crest: Mural crown
- Shield: Per fess Azure and Sable, issuant from base a hand holding a hammer, in canton sinister a mullet of five Or
- Supporters: Oak branches, olive branches, two statues of a soldier and a miner
- Other elements: Red ribbon with the word "Донецк"
- Earlier version

The coat of arms of Donetsk is an official symbol of the city of Donetsk. It depicts a golden hand holding a hammer, alongside a golden five-pointed star to its right. The current version of the coat of arms was adopted on 5 July 1995. The predecessor to the modern-day coat of arms was used in the Ukrainian SSR, dating back to 1968.

The coat of arms is depicted on the Flag of Donetsk.

== Pseudo-coat of arms of Yuzovka ==
While the city was called Yuzovka, it did not have its own coat of arms. There is a widespread opinion that two gnomes holding a shield with crossed hammers was the coat of arms of the city. This coat of arms was published in Theodor Fridgut's book "Yuzovka and Revolution". The coat of arms was then used by the Donetsk newspaper, however, there are no sources that prove it is an official design.

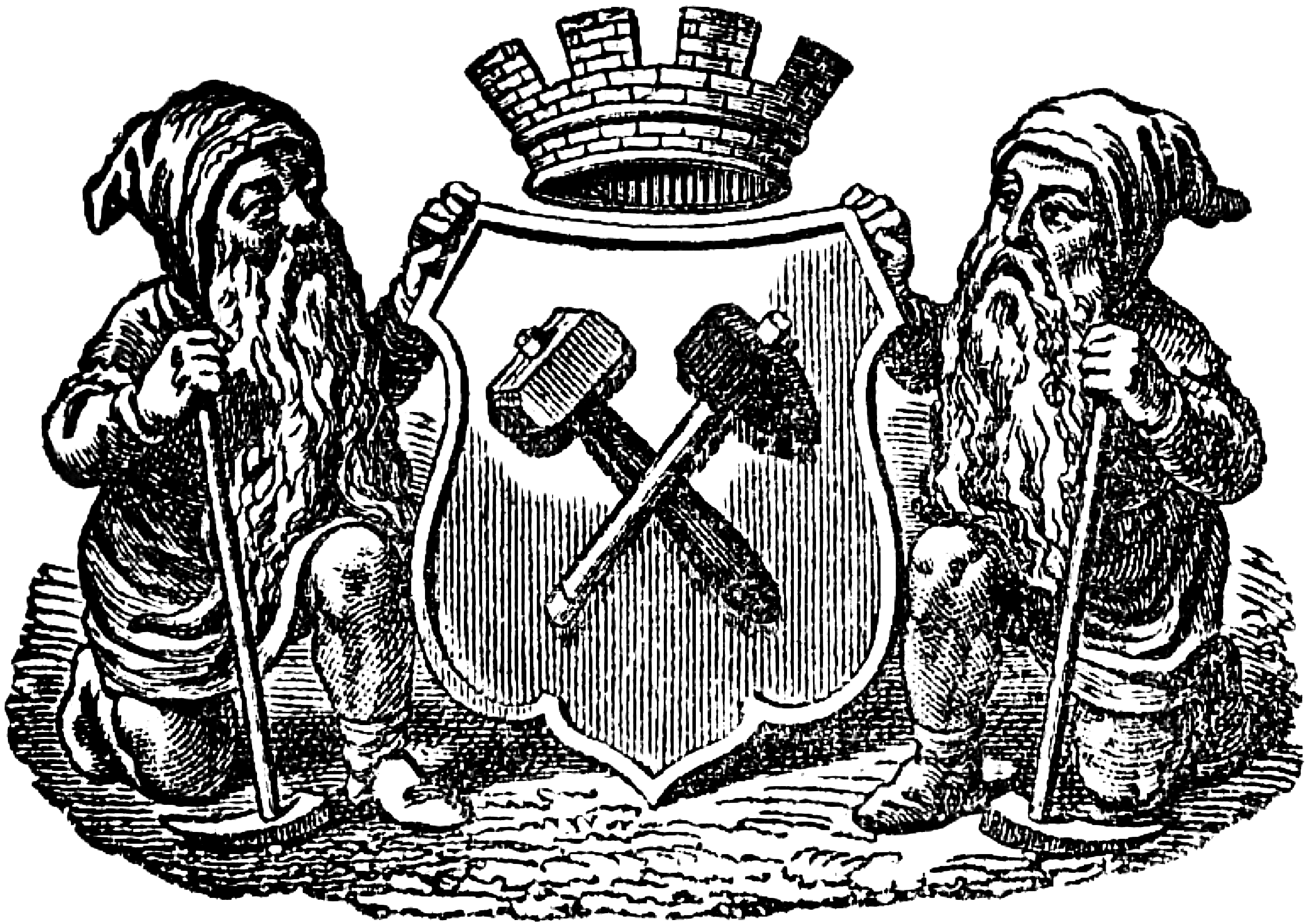
Supposed coat of arms of Yuzovka

== 1968 version ==
The creation of the coat of arms of Donetsk was approved by the city's executive committee on 6 June 1968. The coat of arms was designed by the sculptor Leonid Brin. On the horizontally split silver-black shield, it depicted a hand holding a hammer and a five-pointed star in the top-right corner, all golden.

The general idea of a hand holding a hammer belongs to Georgy Etting, a native of a large city neighboring Donetsk, who eventually became a Donetsk resident. Leonid Brin finalized the project of Georgy Etting.

For some time after the adoption of the official coat of arms, a version with a rose instead of a hammer was used.

== 1995 version ==
In the 1990s, a competition was held for a new version of the coat of arms. On 5 July 1995, the version that won was approved. The silver on the escutcheon was replaced with blue, which is supposed to represent the grandeur architecture and appearance of the city.

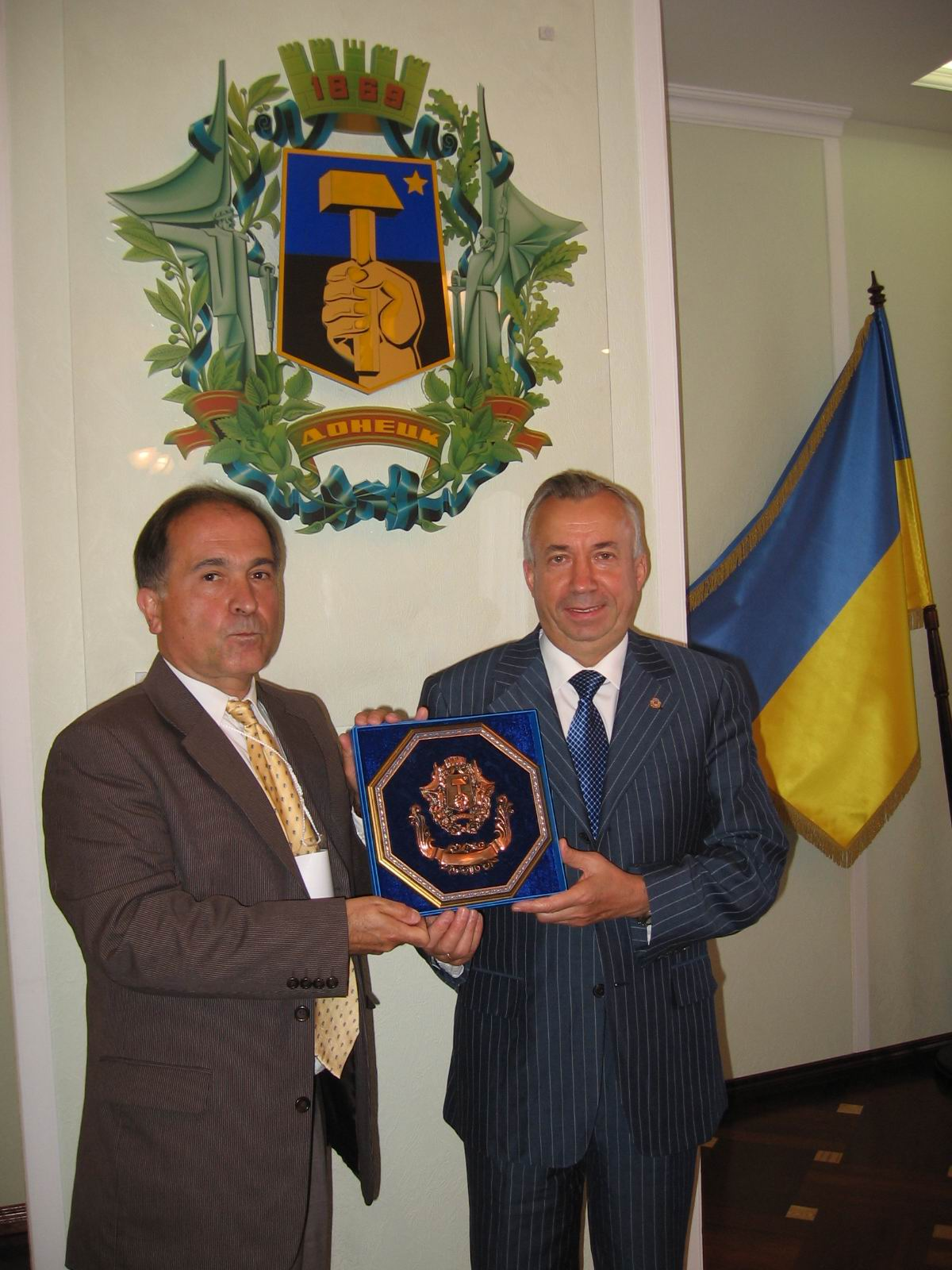
President of the Ukrainian World Congress Askold Lozynskyi accepts a gift consisting of the coat of arms of Donetsk from the mayor Oleksandr Lukyanchenko, 2007

The medal-winning artist, Honored Artist of Ukraine Efim Kharabet proposed using the figures of the monument “To Donbas Liberators” as supporters, on the left a miner, leaning on a jackhammer with his left hand, and on the right a soldier in a military overcoat with a helmet on his head, holding a sword with his right hand with the tip down. Both figures are silver. The composition is entwined with a black and blue horizontal ribbon. On top of the shield there is a golden mural crown with five turrets, on which are written the numbers “1869”, the year the city was founded.

A working hand firmly holding a hammer raised high symbolizes that the city is one of the largest industrial centres in Ukraine. The golden five-pointed star symbolizes a thrifty attitude towards the wealth created by nature and the labor of the people, power, justice and faith in a better future.

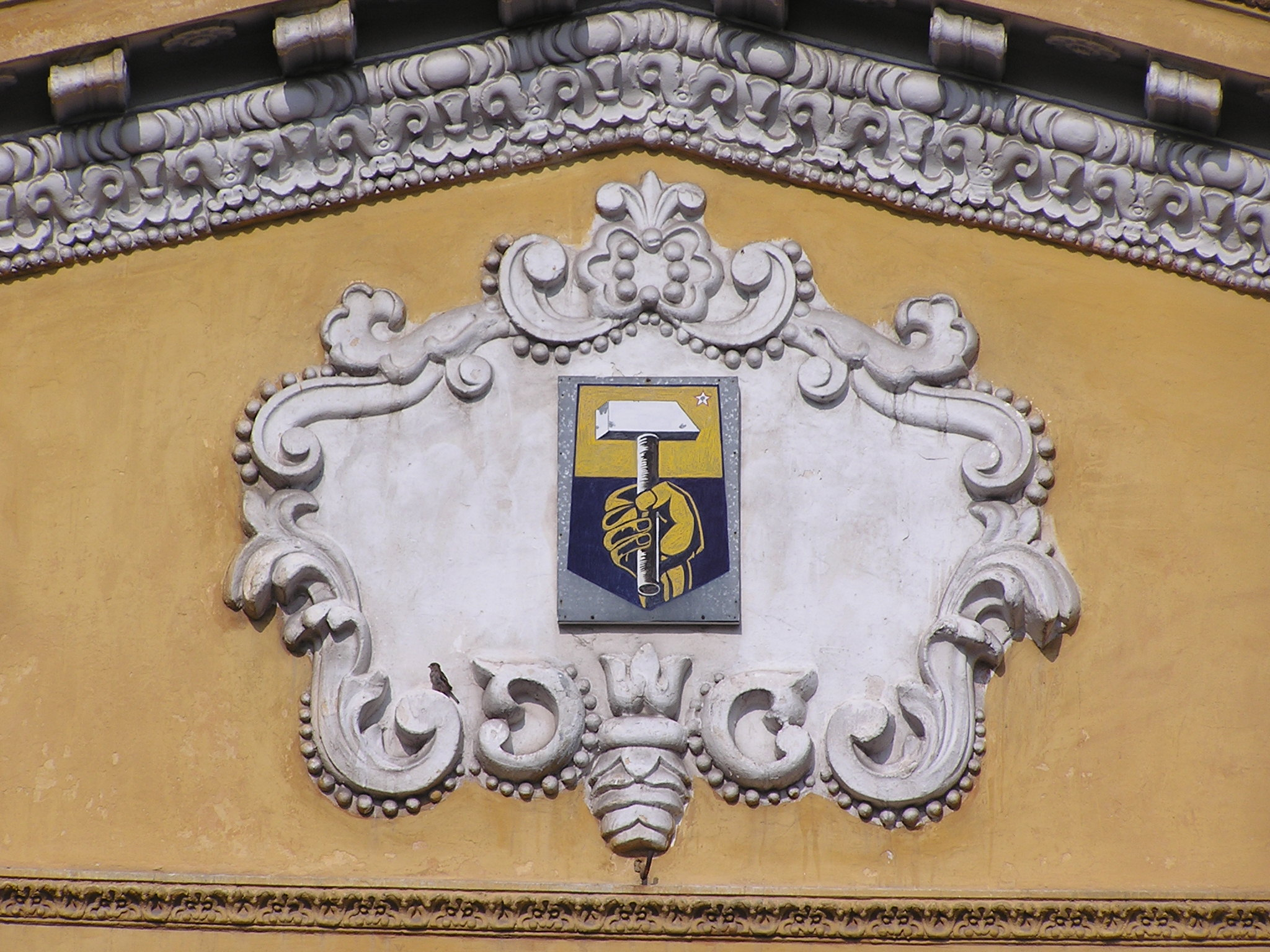
Coat of arms on the Shakhtar Sports Palace

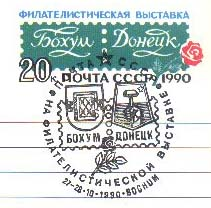
Coats of arms of Donetsk (right) on a special cancellation letter

== See also ==
- Flag of Donetsk
