= Flag of Donetsk Oblast =

Ukrainian oblast flag

Donetsk Oblast
- Use: Civil and state flag
- Proportion: 2:3
- Adopted: 17 August 1999
- Design: A rising gold sun with 12 sunbeams and five gold ovals one under another
- Designed by: Nina Hryhorivna Shcherbak

The flag of the Donetsk Oblast (Ukrainian: Прапор Донецької області), often referred to as the flag of Donbas (Ukrainian: Прапор Донбасу; Russian: Флаг Донбасса), is the official flag of Donetsk Oblast, an oblast of Ukraine. It was designed by artist Nina Shcherbak. The flag was officially adopted on 17 August 1999.

The flag has proportions of 2:3 and is divided into two areas. In the upper part, there is a rising gold sun with 12 sunbeams in the upper fair-blue part of flag (resembling the sky). In the lower black part (resembling the Donets Coal Basin) there are five gold ovals one under another (the reflection of the sun on the surface).

== History ==
On June 29, 1999, the governor announced a competition for the design of regional symbols, in which approximately 200 designs were submitted. Project No. 98, proposed by the Donetsk artist Nina Grigorievna Szczerbak turned out to be victorious. It was approved at the meeting of the regional council on August 17, 1999. As the author recalls, one of the conditions of the competition was to maintain a visual resemblance to the already existing symbols of Donetsk.

Vertical version

The flag in the shape of the region is frequently used for stamps and souvenirs

In 2006, the flag was criticized by Igor Sychev^{uk} for its pro-Ukrainian appearance. Sychev suggested accepting the International Movement of Donbass tricolor instead. Szczerbak, however, stated that it was criticized due to its resemblance to the Russian Air Force flag and added that both interpretations were incorrect because the only inspiration was the nature of the region. The flag was used by pro-Russian protesters in 2014, but since the DPR's declaration of independence, its use in separatist-controlled territory has ceased, and the flag is now primarily used by pro-Ukraine forces. The flag is used in the emblem of the Ukrainian Donbas Battalion.

Flag of International Movement of Donbass (1990–2003)

Flag of the Donbas Battalion (2014–)

Flag of Donetsk People's Republic (2014–)

Flag of the Miner's Division (2014–)

Climbers from the Donetsk Oblast have set the flag at Shishapangma peak (on 27 May 2007), Hoverla (on 9 January 2007), Mont Blanc (on 22 March 2007), Elbrus (on 25 May 2007) and Everest (on 27 May 2008). In 2007 an ascent was made in order to honour the 75th anniversary of the Donetsk Region. On Saturday, 19 May 2012 Vitaly Kutniy, a mine foreman from "Belozerska" mine, climbed Mount Everest and planted the flag of the Donetsk Oblast.

== Local adaptations ==
Flag of Makiivka

Flag of Shakhtarsk

== See also ==
- Flag of Donetsk
- Coat of arms of Donetsk Oblast
