= Kostyantyn Savinov =

Ukrainian politician

- Костянтин Савінов
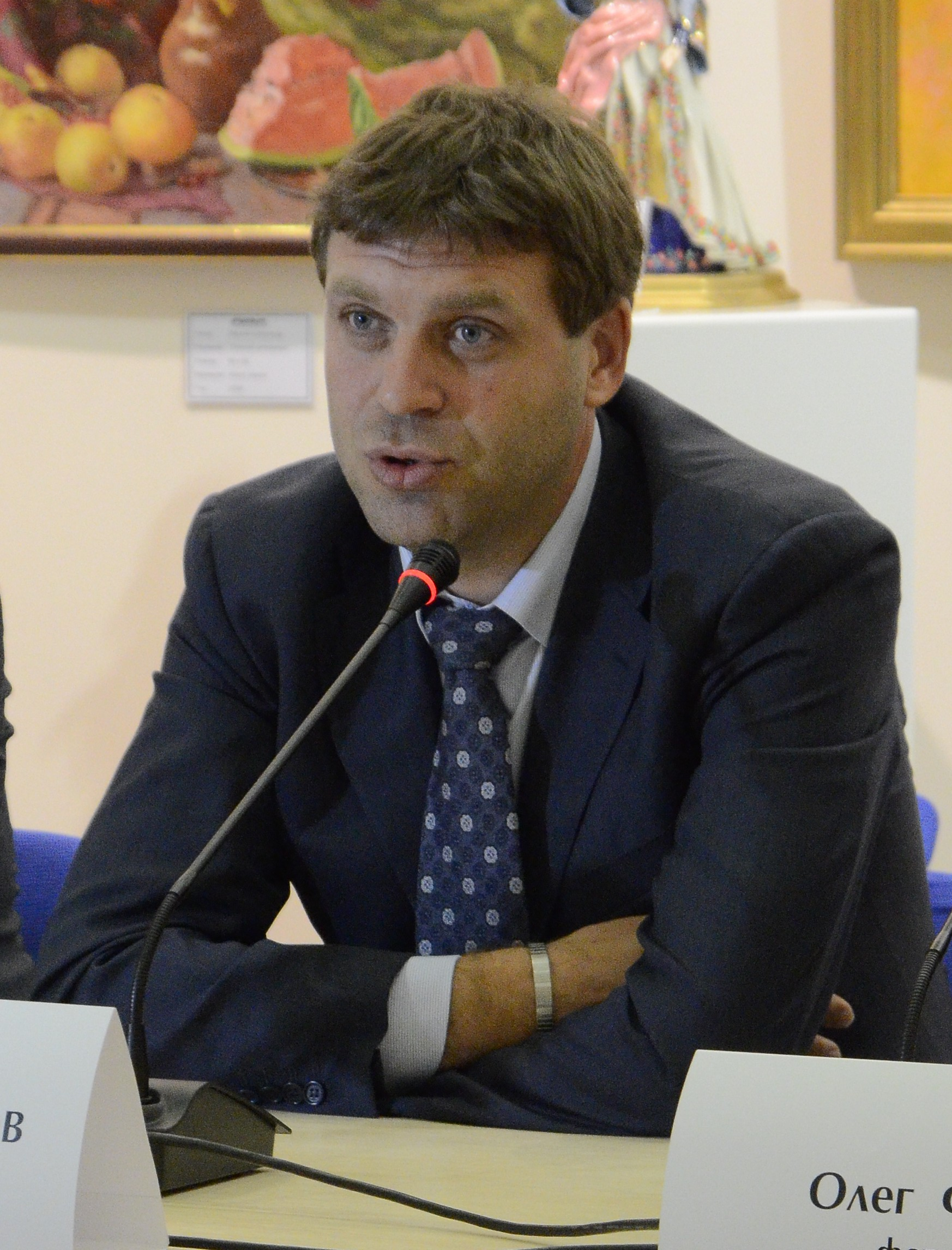
- Savinov in 2012

Acting Mayor of Donetsk
- In office 14 July 2014 – 14 October 2014
- Preceded by: Oleksandr Lukyanchenko
- Succeeded by: Igor Martynov (de facto)

Personal details
- Born: Kostyantyn Lvovych Savinov; 12 March 1975 (age 50) Donetsk, Ukrainian SSR, Soviet Union
- Party: Party of Regions

Kostyantyn Lvovych Savinov (Ukrainian: Костянтин Львович Савінов; Russian: Константин Львович Савинов, romanized: Konstantin Lvovich Savinov; born 12 March 1975), is a Ukrainian politician who served as the de jure acting mayor of Donetsk in 2014.

A member of the Party of Regions, he was the head of the Main Department of Improvement and Public Utilities of the as a member of the Donetsk City Council from 2006 to 2014.

== Biography ==
Savinov was born in Donetsk on 12 March 1975. His parents worked in a vocational education system.

He began his career in December 1990 as a commercial agent of private enterprise "Fox".

In June 1991, he was promoted to the Deputy Director for Marketing and Advertising at PE Fox. In 1993, he was appointed commercial director of Alpex LTD LLC.

In 1997, he graduated from the Donetsk State Academy of Management with a degree in management in the production sector. In 2004, he graduated from Donetsk State University of Management and received a qualification as an economist with a degree in Finance. In 2007, he graduated from Solomon International University with a degree in Law.

In 1997, he headed the company Aspect LLC. From June to August 2004 he worked as commercial director of Landorra LLC.

Between August 2004 to September 2009 – Deputy Director for Financial Affairs at KPF Alkor LLC. In March 2005, he initiated the creation and headed the regional public youth organization Initiative Youth.

In 2006, Savinov was elected to the Donetsk City Council of the 5th convocation, and was the head of the standing commission on trade, advertising and agro-industrial complex, member of the board of managers, member of the land commission.

In 2008, he was awarded the title of Young Entrepreneur of the Year in the Donetsk region. From November 2009 to May 2010, he worked in Zaporozhzhia as the director of the Zaporozhye branch of the subsidiary of Naftogazmerezhi NAK Naftogaz of Ukraine.

In May 2010, he is the head of the Main Department of Improvement and Public Utilities of the Donetsk City Council.

On 14 July 2014, Savinov became the acting mayor of Donetsk. On 17 July, was taken away in an unknown direction by representatives of the DPR.

On 14 October 2014, he was subsequently been replaced by Igor Martynov, the de facto mayor appointed by the Donetsk People's Republic.

He is married, and has two sons and a daughter.
