= Mayor of Donetsk =

The following is a list of mayors of the city of Donetsk, Ukraine. It includes positions equivalent to mayor, such as chairperson of the city council executive committee.

== Mayors ==
- Zuzulya Pavlo Omelyanovich (Зузуля Павло Омелянович), 1917
- Alexander Sheptunov (Александр Шептунов), 1917
- Konstantin Andreevich Kosenko (Косенко Костянтин Андрійович), 1917
- Alfiorov Pavel Alexandrovich (Алфьоров Павло Олександрович), 1917–1918
- Yakiv Vasyliovych Zalmayev (Залмаєв Яків Васильович), 1917–1918
- Eat Semyon Lvovich (Ієйте Семен Львович), 1917
- Bartagov Ivan Vasilyevich, 1918–1919
- Jacob Maximovich Bogomolov (Богомолов Яків Максимович), 1919
- Joseph Gavrilovich Zhukovsky (Жуковський Йосип Гаврилович), 1920-
- Shkadinov Mykola Ivanovych (Шкадінов Микола Іванович), 1923–1925
- Vladimir Konstantinovich Ryzhov (Рижов Володимир Костянтинович), 1925–1928
- Dmitry Fedorovich Sbezhnev (Сбєжнєв Дмитро Федорович), 1927–1928
- Maxim Ivanovich Gromilin (Громілін Максим Іванович), 1928–1930
- Tymofiy Pavlovych Kotov (Котов Тимофій Павлович), 1930
- Leonov AF (Леонов А. Ф.), 1930–1931
- Fedir Guriyovych Ananchenko (Ананченко Федір Гурійович), 1931–1933
- Victor Yakovlevich Konotop (Конотоп Віктор Якович), 1933–1935
- Petro Grigorovich Belokonov (Белоконов Петро Григорович), 1935–1937
- Fedor Vasilyevich Starovoitov (Старовойтов Федір Васильович), 1937–1941
- Mykola Hryhorovych Petushkov (Пєтушков Микола Григорович_, 1942
- Andrey Andreevich Eichman (Ейхман Андрій Андрійович), 1942–1943
- Fedor Vasilyevich Starovoitov (Старовойтов Федір Васильович), 1943–1945
- Mykola Mironovich Matyas (Матяс Микола Миронович), 1945–1947
- Vasily Nikolaevich Feropontov (Феропонтов Василь Миколайович), 1947–1949
- Georgy Petrovich Yefimenko (Єфименко Георгій Петрович), 1949–1953
- Alexey Mikhailovich Bahayev (Бахаєв Олексій Михайлович), 1953–1961
- Vasil Petrovich Mironov (Миронов Василь Петрович), 1961–1976
- Victor Georgievich Somov (Сомов Віктор Георгійович), 1976–1978
- Vladimir Kuzmovich Spitsyn (Спицин Володимир Кузьмович), 1978–1987
- George Ilyich Onyschuk (Онищук Георгій Ілліч), 1987–1989
- Eugene Grigorovich Orlov (Орлов Євген Григорович), 1989–1990

=== Ukraine ===
- Oleksandr Mahmudov (Махмудов Олександр Гафарович), 1990–1992
- Yukhym Zvyahilsky, 1992–1993
- Volodymyr Rybak, 1993–2002
- Oleksandr Lukyanchenko, 2002-2014
- Kostyantyn Savinov, 2014 (acting)

=== Donetsk People's Republic ===
- Igor Martynov, 2014–2016
- Alexey Kulemzin, 2016–2022

=== Russia ===
- Alexey Kulemzin, 2022-

== See also ==
- Donetsk history
- History of Donetsk (in Ukrainian)
- Other names of Donetsk (Aleksandrovka, Stalino, etc.)
