= Berdychi =

Berdychi Бердичі
- Village
- Interactive map of Berdychi
- Location of Berdychi Berdychi (Ukraine)
- Coordinates: 48°11′43″N 37°38′43″E
- Country: Ukraine
- Oblast: Donetsk Oblast
- Raion: Pokrovsk Raion
- Hromada: Ocheretyne settlement hromada
- Elevation: 182 m (597 ft)

Population (2001 census)
  - Total: 267
- Time zone: UTC+2 (EET)
  - Summer (DST): UTC+3 (EEST)
- Postal code: 86050
- Area code: +380 6236
- Climate: Dfa

Berdychi (Ukrainian: Бердичі; Russian: Бердичи) is a village in Ocheretyne settlement hromada, Pokrovsk Raion, Donetsk Oblast, eastern Ukraine.

== History ==
Until 18 July 2020, Berdychi belonged to Yasynuvata Raion. The raion was abolished that day as part of the administrative reform of Ukraine, which reduced the number of raions of Donetsk Oblast to eight, of which only five were controlled by the government. The government-controlled area of Yasynuvata Raion was merged into Pokrovsk Raion.

=== Russo-Ukrainian War ===
Russian invasion of Ukraine

Between 28 February and 28 April 2024, the village was captured by Russia.

== Demographics ==
The population was 267 as of the 2001 Ukrainian census.

Native languages at that time were recorded as:

- Ukrainian: 11.24%
- Russian: 88.39%

== Notable people ==
- Oleksandr Lukyanchenko (born 1947), politician, mayor of Donetsk
