= Alexei Kruchinin =

Russian ice hockey player (born 1991)

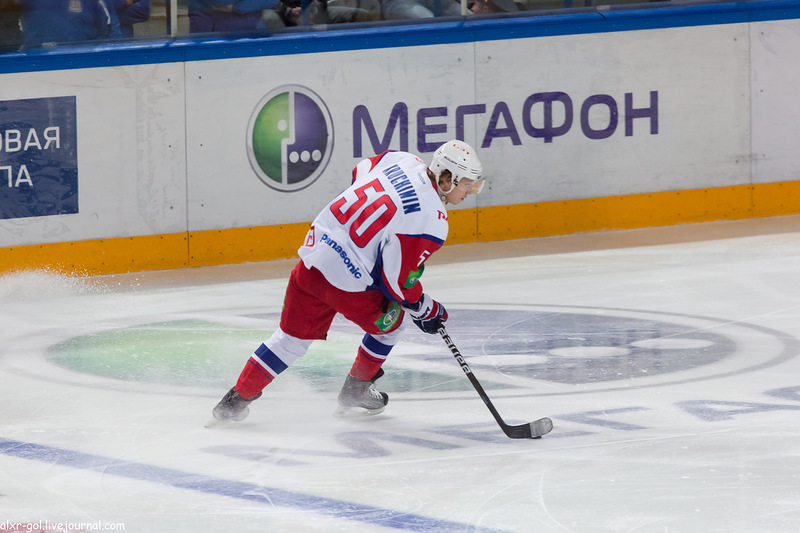
- Born: June 9, 1991 (age 35) Penza, Russia
- Height: 5 ft 11 in (180 cm)
- Weight: 165 lb (75 kg; 11 st 11 lb)
- Position: Forward
- Shoots: Right
- KHL team Former teams: Amur Khabarovsk; SKA Saint Petersburg; Lokomotiv Yaroslavl; HC Yugra; Traktor Chelyabinsk; Salavat Yulaev Ufa; Kunlun Red Star; Sibir Novosibirsk; Torpedo Nizhny Novgorod; Severstal Cherepovets
- Playing career: 2010–present

Alexei Dmitrievich Kruchinin (Russian: Алексей Дмитриевич Кручинин; born June 9, 1991) is a Russian professional ice hockey Forward. He is currently playing with Amur Khabarovsk of the Kontinental Hockey League (KHL).

== Playing career ==
Kruchinin made his Kontinental Hockey League (KHL) debut playing with SKA Saint Petersburg during the 2011–12 KHL season.

During the 2014–15 season, Kruchinin was traded by Lokomotiv Yaroslavl, along with Yegor Martynov, to Traktor Chelyabinsk in exchange for the rights to Petri Kontiola on November 23, 2014.

After four years with Traktor Chelyabinsk, Kruchinin was traded after the 2017–18 season, to his original club, SKA Saint Petersburg in exchange for financial compensation on June 6, 2018.

Kruchinin played one season with SKA, before returning at the conclusion of the 2018–19 season, to Traktor Chelyabinsk on a one-year contract on 11 May 2019.

On 9 June 2024, Kruchinin joined his ninth KHL club, agreeing to a one-year deal with Severstal Cherepovets for the 2024–25 season. After a lone season with Severstal, Kruchinin opted to return to former club Torpedo Nizhny Novgorod, agreeing to captain the club in signing a two-year contract on 1 June 2025.
