= Igor Martynov (politician) =

Ukrainian politician

- Игорь Мартынов
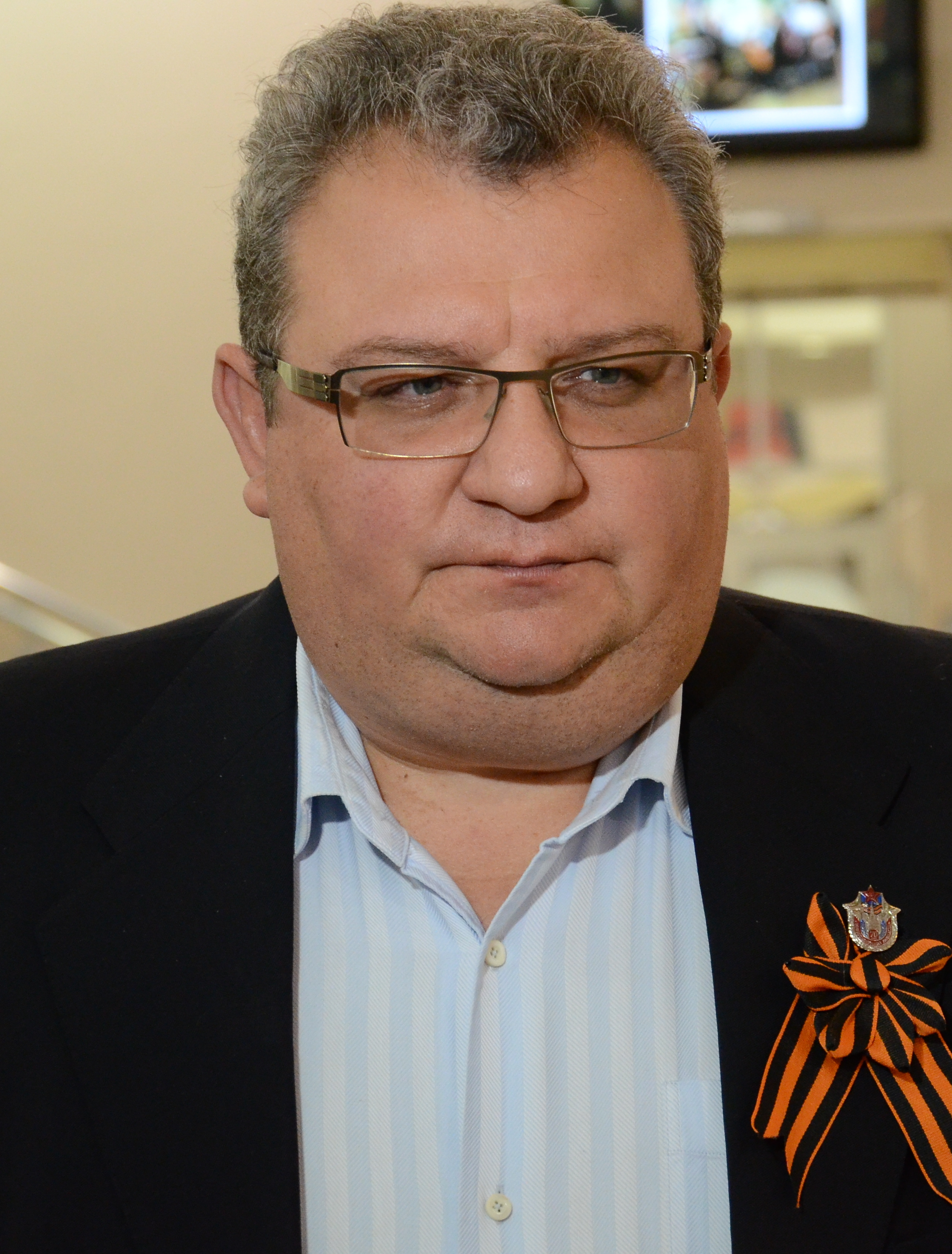
- Martynov in 2015

Advisor to the Head of the Donetsk People's Republic
- Incumbent
- Assumed office 16 May 2019

Mayor of Donetsk
- In office 13 October 2014 – 18 October 2016
- Preceded by: Kostyantyn Savinov (acting) (de jure)
- Succeeded by: Alexey Kulemzin

Personal details
- Born: 22 June 1969 (age 57) Donetsk, Ukrainian SSR, Soviet Union
- Party: Donetsk Republic
- Education: Donetsk National University of Economics and Trade

Igor Yuryevich Martynov (Russian: Игорь Юрьевич Мартынов; born 22 June 1969) is a Ukrainian politician and collaborator who served as the mayor of Donetsk from 13 October 2014 to 18 October 2016. He is currently an advisor to the Head of the Donetsk People's Republic since 16 May 2019.

== Early life ==
Martynov was born on 22 June 1969 in Donetsk, which was then part of the Ukrainian SSR in the Soviet Union. After graduating from the Donetsk National University of Economics and Trade, he began working as the Director of MP PKF "Vostok." He did this until 1997, when he became director of the private enterprise "Maxi", which headed until 2005. Starting in 2006, he became an assistant at the Donetsk National University of Economics and Trade's Department of Marketing and Commercial Affairs, where he chaired the state examination commission for the school.

== Political career ==
He first began his political career by being an assistant-consultant to a People's Deputy of Ukraine in the Verkhovna Rada. In 2005, he was appointed Deputy Chairman of the Kyivskyi District of the city of Donetsk in addition to being a deputy of the Voroshylovskyi District Council for its IV convocation.

In 2010, he was elected a deputy of the Donetsk City Council representing the Party of Regions. During the time of his election, he was Director of the municipal enterprise "Shcherbakov Park of Culture and Recreation".

== International sanctions ==
Martynov, for his role in the Donetsk People's Republic, has been sanctioned internationally by the European Union, United Kingdom, Canada, Switzerland, Japan, and Ukraine.
