= Donetsk Academy of Management and Public Administration =

Donetsk State University of Management

Donetsk State University of Management
- Донецький державний університет управління
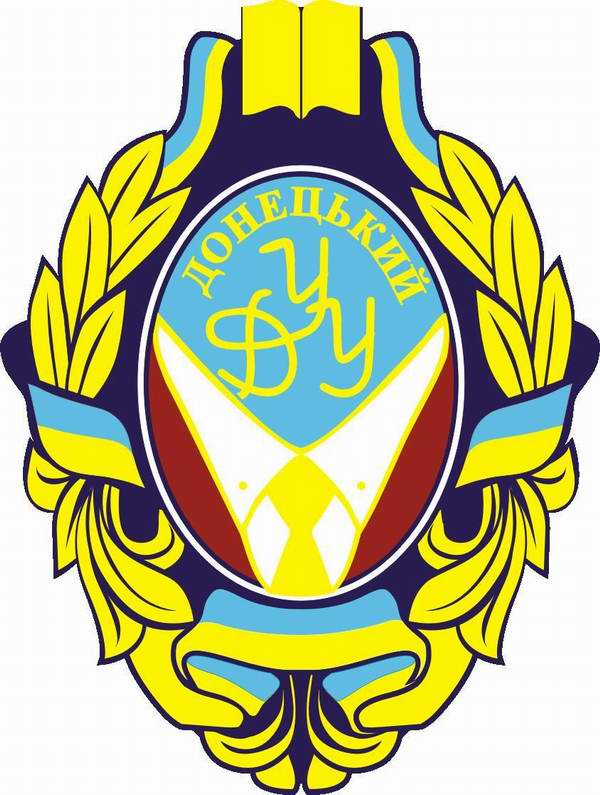
- Type: Academy
- Active: 1992–2022
- Students: 7550
- Location: Donetsk, Ukraine; 48°00′45″N 37°48′31″E
- Campus: 6
- Website: registry.edbo.gov.ua/university/191/
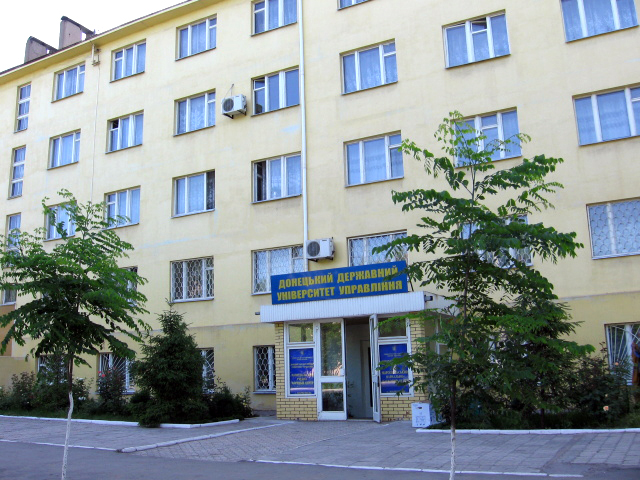

Donetsk State University of Management (Ukrainian: Донецький державний університет управління; Russian: Донецкий государственный университет управления) was a university located in Donetsk prior to the city’s occupation in 2014. After 2014, it was relocated to Mariupol, where it later merged with Mariupol State University, resulting in its dissolution on June 1, 2022. It was founded on June 18, 1992 as the Donetsk State Academy of Management and was awarded the status of university in 2004.

== History ==
=== 1990s ===
- Donetsk Academy of Management was established in June 1992 on the basis of Institute of Qualification Improvement of the Executives and Experts of the State Committee of Coal Industry of the Soviet Union.
- The Academy was granted the status of public higher education establishment. The Charter of the Academy, its structure and Academic Council were developed and approved. Science-and-research department was organized.
- Faculties of Production Management, Non-Production Management, Distant Learning, Post-diploma Education, and Faculty for Foreign Students were founded. Students’ Scientific Society was organized.
- The Academy newspaper “On Academic Knowledge” began to be published.
- The Academy was fully certified and accredited according to the III level of national accreditation of higher education institutions.
- 1996 – the Academy granted its first graduates.
- Colleges of the Academy in the towns of Vuhledar and Yasynuvata were opened.
- Students of the Academy became the members of the Eurasian Students Association.
- Post-diploma and Master Studies were opened. The College in Torez was established. The Association of the Graduates was set up.
- The first agreements on cooperation with some educational institutions of Germany, Great Britain, the USA and France were signed.
- The first issue of scientific journal “Manager” was published.
- The Anthem of the Academy and the standards of the Faculties were approved.
- By the decision of State Certification Board, DSAM was certified and accredited with the IV level of accreditation. The Specialized Academic Council on PhD Theses Defense in Public Administration was organized.

=== 2000s ===
- American Biographic Institute awarded Professor Stanislav Povazhny, the Rector of DSAM the title “The Man of the Year 2000”.
- 2001 - the Rector of DSAM was awarded the title “Honorary Citizen of Donetsk”.
- According to the Rating of Higher Educational Establishments of Ukraine DSAM was among the five best higher education institutions specialized in management education in 2001.
- 2002 – Donetsk State Academy of Management celebrated its 10th anniversary and the Museum of DSAM History was founded.
- The Specialized Council on Doctor’s Theses Defense was organized.
- The Rector of DSAM, Professor Stanislav Povazhny was titled the Corresponding Member of Academy of Pedagogical Sciences of Ukraine.
- 2004 - by the decision of the Cabinet of Ministers of Ukraine Donetsk State Academy of Management was accredited with the title of the University.
- Became the winner of the Rating of Higher Educational Establishments of Ukraine according to the results of the academic year and was awarded by Diploma of Sofia Kievskaya.
- Professor Alexander Povazhny, Vice-Rector for Academic Affairs, Doctor of Sciences in Economics, Head of Department of Finance became the Laureate of President of Ukraine Award for Young Scientists.
- Joined Eurasian Association of Universities.
- Awarded the Diploma of Ministry of Education and Science of Ukraine for the high quality of training.
- 2007 - Professor Alexander Povazhny was elected he Rector at the meeting of the University’s staff.
- The Specialized Academic Council on PhD Theses Defense of Candidate in Sociology was organized.
- Signed a memorandum of understanding with United Nations Development Program in Ukraine.

=== 2010s ===
- 2010 - English Track MA European management of international economic activities was launched.
- On August 21, 2012 Donetsk State University of Management celebrated its 20th anniversary.

== Campuses ==
Campus facilities include 7 study buildings and 6 comfortable hostels where housing is guaranteed for all five years. For students’ service there are numerous computer classes with free Wi-Fi Internet connection. Students have free medical care and treatment for minor injuries at Medical Service. The University’s library is an essential support to study, teaching, and research activities. Almost 230 000 copies of books and periodicals represent important information service.

== Structure ==
The University offers following centres and colleges:

- Centre of Postgraduate Education
- Centre for Pre-vocational training
- Centre for Foreign Students
- Vuhledar College carries out BA training of students in Finance and Credit, and Management. The College offers full-time and part-time forms of training.
- Yasynovataya College was founded to grant students for BA degree in Finance and Credit, and Management. The College offers part-time form of training.
- Torez College provides BA education for students on the following specialties: Finance and Credit, Production Management, Non-Production Management, Management of Foreign Economic Activities.
- Mariupol Educational-and-Scientific Centre was founded as a structural division of Donetsk State University of Management in 2002. The Centre provides education for students at bachelor's degree programs in Finance and Credit, Marketing, Management, Production Sphere Management, Non-production Sphere Management, Management of Foreign Economic Activities specialties.

== Awards and reputation ==
According to the rating of the best universities in Ukraine, which is compiled by the Ministry of Education, Youth and Sports of Ukraine, DSUM in 2012 ranked 3rd place among higher educational institutions "Economics, Finance, Management, Entrepreneurship". So far more than 16 thousand University graduates have become highly qualified specialists, who joined the ranks of management elite of Donetsk city, Donetsk region and Ukraine.

== Student life ==
There are the following events that take place during the year:

- Inauguration of New Academic Year - students get acquainted with academic and extracurricular activity of the University.
- Forum of Leaders of Students' Self-governance Organizations - is a wonderful opportunity to spend a week at the seaside, exchanging ideas and new projects. In recent years, the number of participants of the Forum significantly increased and its format has become international.
- Debut of the first year students is perfect opportunity for freshmen to demonstrate their talents on the stage.
- Students' Day is the most expected and famous holiday among the students and in frames of its celebration the following events are held:
- Cossack Entertainments - folk show with traditional Ukrainian dances and jokes, culinary show - special event for gourmands
- Hollywood Night is ball for students and the night out for funs of glamorous parties.
- Humorous Show - a team with its witty jokes became permanent participant of inter-universities humorous festivals.
- Beauty Contest Miss University of Management - holiday of beauty, grace and fashion.
- 'University Stars - peculiarity of the show is participation of faculty and staff along with students.

There are plenty of events for sports fans as well:

- Press conferences with players of FC Shakhtar with the participation of Viktor Grachev, Douglas Costa, Alex Teisheira.
- Meetings with Pavel Burenko, Captain of Basketball Club "Donetsk", as well as his teammates Max Adam Konate and Alexander Lipovoy, players of national team of Ukraine.
- Meetings with players of Hockey Club Donbass.

University football team is winner of international tournaments among universities

== Alumni ==
The following are the notable alumni of the Academy:

- Borys Kolesnikov, Ukrainian politician
- Klimenko Aleksandr Viktorovich, Minister of revenue and charges of Ukraine
- Oleksandr Lukyanchenko, former Mayor of Donetsk
- Yana Klochkova, Hero Of Ukraine, four-time Olympic champion in swimming
- Lilia Podkopayeva, Olympic Champion gymnast
- Dmytro Chyhrynskyi, footballer of FC Shakhtar Donetsk, UEFA Europa League Cup winner.
- Smirnov Victor-Hero of Ukraine, multiple champion and medalist of Paralympic Games in swimming
- Aleksandr Revva, Russian comedian
- Tìslenko Alexandr, Chairman of the Board of Directors of Altcom
- Viktor Beschastnyi, Rector of Donetsk Law Institute under the Ministry of Home Affairs of Ukraine
