= Petri Kontiola =

Finnish ice hockey player (born 1984)

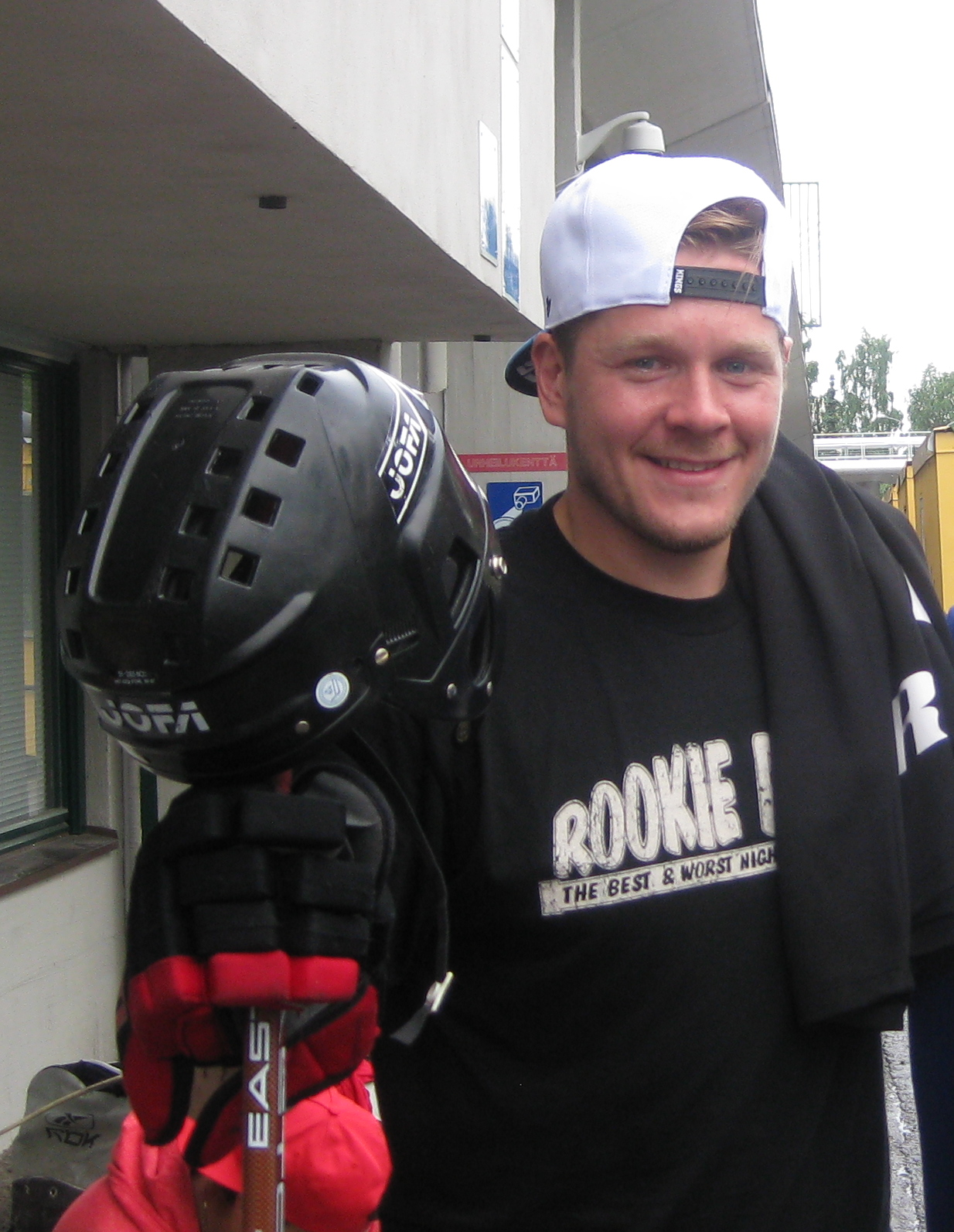
- Kontiola in 2013
- Born: October 4, 1984 (age 41) Seinäjoki, Finland
- Height: 6 ft 0 in (183 cm)
- Weight: 203 lb (92 kg; 14 st 7 lb)
- Position: Centre
- Shoots: Right
- Liiga team Former teams: Ilves; Tappara; Chicago Blackhawks; Metallurg Magnitogorsk; Traktor Chelyabinsk; Toronto Marlies; Lokomotiv Yaroslavl; Jokerit; HPK
- National team: Finland
- NHL draft: 196th overall, 2004; Chicago Blackhawks
- Playing career: 2003–present

Petri Kontiola (born October 4, 1984) is a retired Finnish professional ice hockey centre. Kontiola has previously played in the National Hockey League (NHL) for the Chicago Blackhawks, the organization that drafted him 196th overall in the 2004 NHL entry draft.

== Playing career ==
Kontiola was drafted 196th overall in the 2004 NHL entry draft by the Chicago Blackhawks while playing for Tappara in the Finnish SM-liiga. He played professionally for four years with Tappara before making his North American debut for Chicago during the 2007–08 season.

Kontiola started out with the Blackhawks' American Hockey League (AHL) affiliate, the Rockford IceHogs, before playing in his first career NHL game on November 25, 2007, against the Vancouver Canucks.

On March 4, 2009, Kontiola was traded by the Blackhawks, along with James Wisniewski, to the Anaheim Ducks in exchange for Samuel Påhlsson, Logan Stephenson and a conditional draft pick in 2009. He was immediately sent down to the Ducks' AHL affiliate, the Iowa Chops, where he played for the remainder of the 2008–09 season.

On May 26, 2009, Kontiola left North America after signing with Russian club Metallurg Magnitogorsk of the Kontinental Hockey League (KHL) on a two-year contract.

On May 3, 2011, Kontiola signed a two-year contract with KHL rival Traktor Chelyabinsk.

On July 3, 2014, Kontiola bought his release from Traktor and signed a one-year contract as a free agent with the Toronto Maple Leafs. He attended Toronto's training camp but failed to make an impression and on September 29, was assigned to the Toronto Marlies, the Maple Leafs' AHL affiliate. In the 2014–15 season, after 11 scoreless games with the Marlies, Kontiola was placed on unconditional waivers in order to terminate his contract and return to the KHL on November 20. Three days later, Kontiola's KHL rights were traded by Traktor to Lokomotiv Yaroslavl in exchange for Alexei Kruchinin and Yegor Martynov. Kontiola then signed a two-year contract with Yaroslavl on November 28.

After five seasons with Lokomotiv Yaroslavl, Kontiola left as a free agent following the 2018–19 season. He signed a one-year contract to continue in the KHL, returning to Finland to join Jokerit on May 1, 2019.

== International play ==
Medal record

Representing Finland

Ice hockey

Olympic Games
Bronze medal – third place	2014 Sochi	

World Championships
Silver medal – second place	2007 Russia	
Silver medal – second place	2014 Belarus	
Silver medal – second place	2021 Latvia	

World Junior Championships
Bronze medal – third place	2004 Finland	

Kontiola made his international debut for Finland's junior team at the 2004 World Junior Championships in Helsinki, scoring 2 points in 7 games to help earn a bronze medal. He was later named to the men's 2007 IIHF World Championship team in Russia to make his senior debut. He finished among the Finnish leaders with 7 points in 9 games as Finland lost in the final to Canada to earn silver.

Kontiola returned to the Finnish team three year later when he was selected for the 2010 IIHF World Championship tournament held in Germany. In seven games, he scored three goals before Finland was eliminated on May 20, 2010, after Kontiola missed a penalty-shot in the quarterfinal shootout against the Czech Republic.

Kontiola was named to the Finnish roster for competition at the 2014 IIHF World Championship. An interview he gave at the tournament with Czech Television reporter Hana Ježková, in which he replied "I don't know" to all three of her questions before walking away, went viral. Kontiola later gave Ježková another interview and hugged her to apologize.

Kontiola played in the 2021 IIHF World Championship, where he won his third silver medal. His mistake during the overtime period of the gold medal game led to Nick Paul scoring the tournament-winning goal for team Canada.

== Career statistics ==
=== Regular season and playoffs ===
			Regular season					Playoffs
Season	Team	League	GP	G	A	Pts	PIM	GP	G	A	Pts	PIM
2000–01	S–Kiekko	FIN.2 U18	14	13	12	25	4	—	—	—	—	—
2001–02	Tappara	FIN U18	22	5	3	8	8	2	1	0	1	2
2002–03	Tappara	FIN U20	36	7	10	17	12	8	3	3	6	0
2003–04	Tappara	FIN U20	12	3	12	15	8	10	4	4	8	10
2003–04	Tappara	SM-l	39	4	9	13	29	3	1	1	2	0
2003–04	Suomi U20	Mestis	6	1	1	2	4	—	—	—	—	—
2004–05	Tappara	FIN U20	1	1	0	1	0	—	—	—	—	—
2004–05	Tappara	SM-l	54	8	17	25	24	8	2	2	4	4
2005–06	Tappara	SM-l	56	9	35	44	55	6	1	3	4	0
2006–07	Tappara	SM-l	51	12	35	47	50	5	1	3	4	8
2007–08	Rockford IceHogs	AHL	66	18	50	68	32	12	5	5	10	4
2007–08	Chicago Blackhawks	NHL	12	0	5	5	6	—	—	—	—	—
2008–09	Rockford IceHogs	AHL	61	15	38	53	22	—	—	—	—	—
2008–09	Iowa Chops	AHL	20	4	5	9	8	—	—	—	—	—
2009–10	Metallurg Magnitogorsk	KHL	54	7	15	22	24	10	2	2	4	0
2010–11	Metallurg Magnitogorsk	KHL	54	14	34	48	36	16	2	6	8	14
2011–12	Traktor Chelyabinsk	KHL	53	15	22	37	34	16	3	5	8	37
2012–13	Traktor Chelyabinsk	KHL	44	12	19	31	51	25	10	9	19	12
2013–14	Traktor Chelyabinsk	KHL	53	15	22	37	34	—	—	—	—	—
2014–15	Toronto Marlies	AHL	11	0	0	0	6	—	—	—	—	—
2014–15	Lokomotiv Yaroslavl	KHL	26	1	10	11	12	6	0	0	0	0
2015–16	Lokomotiv Yaroslavl	KHL	48	7	25	32	24	—	—	—	—	—
2016–17	Lokomotiv Yaroslavl	KHL	59	18	22	40	34	15	2	6	8	14
2017–18	Lokomotiv Yaroslavl	KHL	52	11	16	27	24	9	1	4	5	4
2018–19	Lokomotiv Yaroslavl	KHL	41	9	12	21	10	—	—	—	—	—
2019–20	Jokerit	KHL	61	11	24	35	36	4	1	0	1	0
2020–21	HPK	Liiga	55	14	41	55	54	—	—	—	—	—
2021–22	Ilves	Liiga	52	8	30	38	40	13	1	6	7	6
Liiga totals			307	55	167	222	252	35	6	15	21	16
NHL totals			12	0	5	5	6	—	—	—	—	—
KHL totals			545	120	221	341	319	101	21	33	54	81

=== International ===
Year	Team	Event	Result	GP	G	A	Pts	PIM
2004	Finland	WJC	3rd place, bronze medalist(s)	7	1	1	2	2
2007	Finland	WC	2nd place, silver medalist(s)	9	2	5	7	2
2010	Finland	WC	6th	7	3	0	3	2
2012	Finland	WC	4th	10	0	2	2	4
2013	Finland	WC	4th	10	8	8	16	8
2014	Finland	OG	3rd place, bronze medalist(s)	6	1	4	5	0
2014	Finland	WC	2nd place, silver medalist(s)	10	3	6	9	20
2015	Finland	WC	6th	8	1	1	2	2
2018	Finland	OG	6th	5	2	4	6	6
2021	Finland	WC	2nd place, silver medalist(s)	10	0	3	3	2
Junior totals				7	1	1	2	2
Senior totals				75	20	33	53	46
