= Yukhym Zvyahilsky =

Ukrainian politician (1933–2021)

Hero of Ukraine Yukhym Zvyahilsky
- Юхим Звягільський
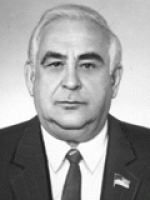
- Official portrait, 1990

People's Deputy of Ukraine
- In office 15 May 1990 – 29 August 2019

Acting Prime Minister of Ukraine
- In office 22 September 1993 – 16 June 1994
- President: Leonid Kravchuk
- Preceded by: Leonid Kuchma
- Succeeded by: Vitaliy Masol

4th First Vice Prime Minister of Ukraine
- In office 11 June 1993 – 4 July 1994
- Prime Minister: Leonid Kuchma
- Preceded by: Ihor Yukhnovskyi
- Succeeded by: Viktor Pynzenyk

Mayor of Donetsk
- In office 1992 – September 1993
- Preceded by: Oleksandr Makhmudov
- Succeeded by: Volodymyr Rybak

Personal details
- Born: 20 February 1933 Stalino, Ukrainian SSR, Soviet Union (now Donetsk, Ukraine)
- Died: 6 November 2021 (aged 88) Kyiv, Ukraine
- Resting place: Baikove Cemetery
- Party: Communist Party of the USSR (1950s–1991); Party of Regions (2000–2021)
- Spouse: Lyudmyla (born 1931)
- Children: 1
- Education: Donetsk Industrial Institute (1956)

Yukhym Leonidovych Zvyahilsky (Ukrainian: Юхим Леонідович Звягільський, Russian: Ефим Леонидович Звягильский; 20 February 1933 – 6 November 2021) was a Ukrainian politician.

He is the only member of Verkhovna Rada who was elected to parliament in eight elections (from 1990 until Zvyahilsky did not participate in the 2019 Ukrainian parliamentary election).

In 1993 and 1994, Zvyahilsky served as the first vice prime minister and acting prime minister.

== Biography ==
Zvyahilsky was born the son of a Jewish civil servant in Stalino on 20 February 1933. In 1956, he graduated from the Donetsk Industrial Institute as a mining engineer. After graduating, Zvyahilsky worked at mine #13 of the Soviet trust company "Kuibyshevugol" (Kuibyshev Coal) as a chief assistant, later as a chief of a coal precinct, chief engineer, and director. In 1972, he wrote a thesis, "Observation of regional technological schemes of mining fields in the development of thin inclined layers (in reference to the Donetsk-Makiivka region of Donetsk basin)" (Moscow Mining Institute), earning him the academical title of a Candidate of Sciences. Later Zvyahilsky defended his doctorate on the subject "Geomechanical foundations of landslides of the earth surface above mines, which can be eliminated" (Institute of geotechnical mechanics of the National Academy of Sciences of Ukraine). Coincidentally, in the early 1990s, Ukraine suffered from the miners' strikes that led to the early presidential elections in 1994.

From 1970 to 1979, Zvyahilsky worked at the Kuibyshev Mine Corporation of the Industrial Union "Donetskugol" (Donetsk Coal). In 1975, he was appointed a director of the company. From 1979 through 1992, Zvyahilsky was a director of the Zasyadko coal mine of the Industrial Union "Donetskugol". The mine, known for its chronic accidents, became particularly famous in 2007 for the most deadly disaster in the mining history of Ukraine.

In March 1990, as a member of the Communist Party of the Soviet Union, Zvyahilsky was elected to the Parliament of Ukraine from the 112th electoral district. In November 1992, he was appointed the city council and executive committee chairman. In June 1993, Zvyahilsky was appointed to the Kuchma's Cabinet as the first vice-prime minister. Being the first vice-prime minister in the Cabinet of Kuchma, he served as an acting prime minister from 22 September 1993 after Leonid Kuchma resigned. Zvyahilsky was the longest-serving prime minister without being officially appointed to the role. Zvyahilsky kept the appointment until Vitaliy Masol was confirmed as the prime minister of Ukraine in June 1994.

In March 1994, now as an independent, Zvyahilsky was elected to the parliament from the 110th electoral district. In 1994, Zviahilskyi, being perceived as affiliated with Leonid Kravchuk, was accused of having stolen some $20 million by Ukrainian president Kuchma during his term as acting prime minister, and he fled to Israel in fear for his life. Zvyagilsky was also accused of transporting $300 million in illegal cash to Israel in 1994 with the help of the Israeli special service Nativ. After some time Zviahilskyi returned to Ukraine in March 1997 and as a sitting member of Verkhovna Rada missed most of the sessions of the parliament.

In 1998, Zvyahilsky, once again as an independent, was elected now from the 43rd electoral district. In 2002, he was again elected to the parliament as a member of the Party of Regions. Zvyahilsky became a member of the Verkhovna Rada (parliament), representing the ruling Party of Regions, and owner of the Zasyadko coal mine in Donetsk. Being a member of Parliament, he had immunity from prosecution. In the 2012 parliamentary elections elected for the Party of Regions in a single-mandate majoritarian election district number 45 with 72.59% of the votes.

In the 2014 parliamentary election, Zvyahilsky was re-elected into parliament again as an independent candidate in single-member districts number 45 situated in the Kyiv Raion of Donetsk; this time with 72.73% of the votes. In his constituency, only a handful of polling stations were open due to the war in Donbas; this led to Zvyahilsky winning a seat with only 1,450 votes. In parliament he joined the faction of Opposition Bloc.

Zvyahilsky did not participate in the 2019 Ukrainian parliamentary election for the first time since 1990 he did not run for parliamentary elections. He died on 6 November 2021, aged 88, from complications of COVID-19 during the COVID-19 pandemic in Ukraine.

He also was co-president of the Jewish Conference of Ukraine.

== Awards ==
- Jubilee Medal "In Commemoration of the 100th Anniversary of the Birth of Vladimir Ilyich Lenin" (1970)
- Order of the Red Banner of Labour (1971)
- Distinguished Miner of Ukraine (1979)
- Order of the October Revolution (1981)
- Hero of Socialist Labour (1986)
- Honorary citizen of Donetsk (1998)
- State Prize of Ukraine in the field of science and technology (2002)
- Hero of Ukraine (2003)
- Order of Prince Yaroslav the Wise, 5th class (2009)
- Order of Prince Yaroslav the Wise, 4th class (2013)

== See also ==
- List of mayors of Donetsk

Political offices
Preceded by Ihor Yukhnovsky	First Vice Prime Minister of Ukraine; 1993–1994	Succeeded by Viktor Pynzenyk
