= Yegor Martynov =

Russian ice hockey player (born 1990)

- Born: August 15, 1990 (age 35) Chelyabinsk, Soviet Union
- Height: 6 ft 2 in (188 cm)
- Weight: 196 lb (89 kg; 14 st 0 lb)
- Position: Defence
- Shoots: Right
- KHL team Former teams: Free agent Metallurg Novokuznetsk; Sibir Novosibirsk; Lokomotiv Yaroslavl; Traktor Chelyabinsk; Avangard Omsk; Metallurg Magnitogorsk; Torpedo Nizhny Novgorod; Dynamo Moscow
- Playing career: 2010–present

Yegor Sergeyevich Martynov (Russian: Егор Сергеевич Мартынов; born August 15, 1990) is a Russian professional ice hockey defenceman who is currently a free agent.. He last played for HC Dynamo Moscow of the Kontinental Hockey League (KHL).

== Playing career ==
Martynov made his Kontinental Hockey League (KHL) debut playing with Metallurg Novokuznetsk during the 2013–14 season.

During the 2014–15 season, Martynov was traded by Lokomotiv Yaroslavl, along with Alexei Kruchinin, to Traktor Chelyabinsk in exchange for the rights to Petri Kontiola on November 23, 2014.

Martynov extended his career in the KHL, leaving Metallurg Magnitogorsk after the 2020–21 season and signing a one-year contract with his seventh club, Torpedo Nizhny Novgorod, on 12 July 2021.

After a lone season with Torpedo Nizhny Novgorod, Martynov continued his journeyman career in signing a two-year contract with HC Dynamo Moscow, his eighth KHL club, on 3 May 2022.
