= Flag of Donetsk =

Donetsk Донецьк
- Proportion: 4:5
- Adopted: 27 September 2004
- Design: Two even horizontal stripes, azure above and black below, with the shield from the city's coat of arms overlaid in gold centrally.

The flag of Donetsk has two horizontal stripes with the shield (in heraldry, an escutcheon) of the city's coat of arms overlaid centrally.

== Description ==
A rectangular panel with a ratio of 1.5 length to 1.2 width (5:4). The flag is divided horizontally into two equal parts, the top half colored azure and the bottom sable (black). Overlaid in the center lies the shield (escutcheon) from the coat of arms of Donetsk. The flag is hoist at the left, with the flagpole tipped.

The shield is a pentagonal extension of a rectangle, with an Or (gold) hand clutching a hammer as if to strike, with a star at the edge of the top right canton, which should not be confused with it being at the upper dexter corner of the flag itself, which generally signifies a war flag.

The shield is a symbol from socialist heraldry and denotes the city's status as a major centre for the mining of coal and production of steel.

== See also ==
- List of Ukrainian flags
