= Volodymyr Rybak (politician, born 1946) =

Ukrainian politician

- Володимир Рибак
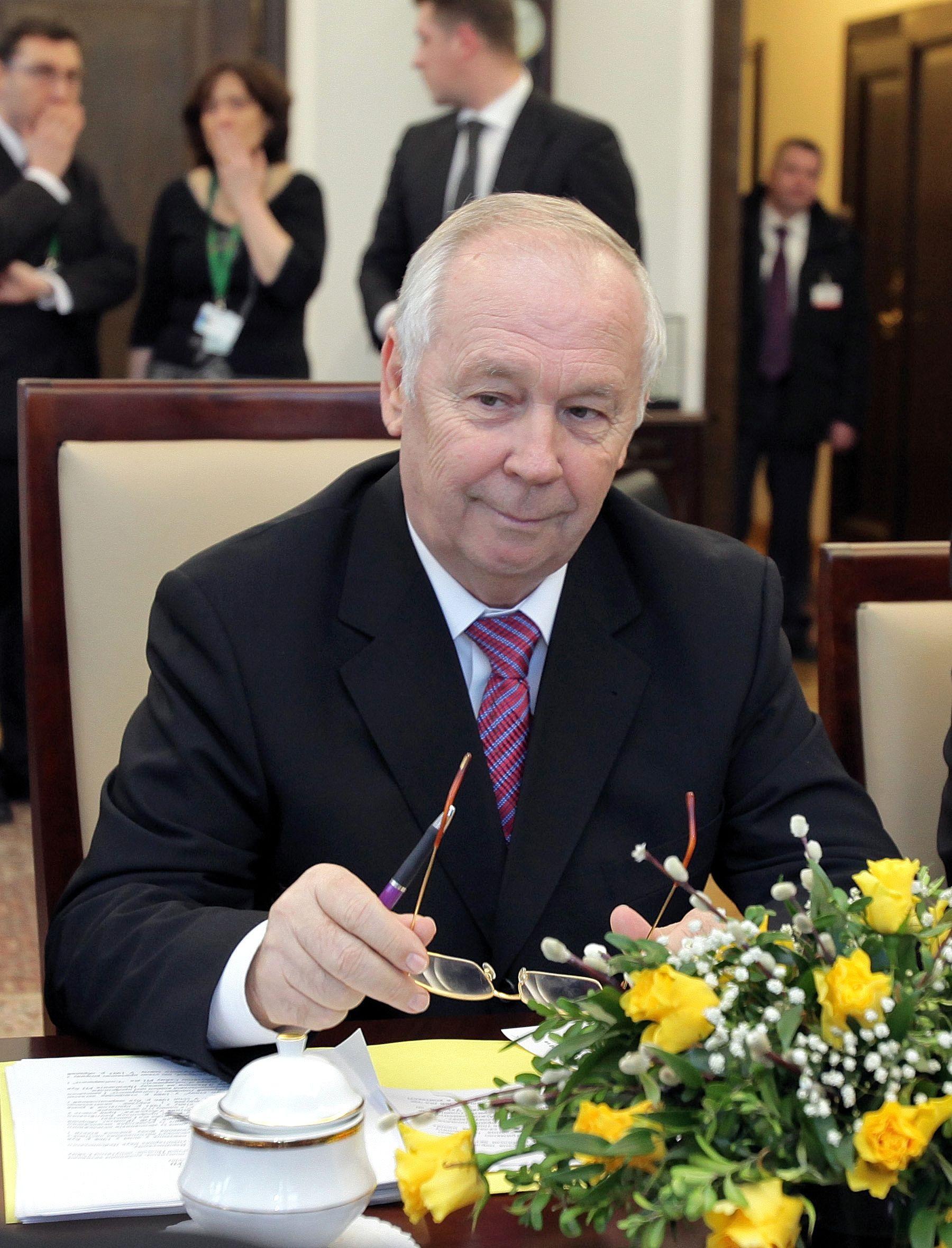
- Rybak in 2013

Chairman of the Verkhovna Rada
- In office 13 December 2012 – 22 February 2014
- President: Viktor Yanukovych
- Preceded by: Volodymyr Lytvyn
- Succeeded by: Oleksandr Turchynov

Deputy Prime Minister of Ukraine for Construction, Architecture and Communal Living
- In office 4 August 2006 – 21 March 2007
- Prime Minister: Viktor Yanukovych
- Preceded by: Pavlo Kachur (as minister of Construction, Architecture, and Communal Living)
- Succeeded by: Volodymyr Yatsuba (Note: As Minister of only Regional Development and Construction, since the Ministry of Communal Living was split off.); Oleksandr Popov (Note: As Minister of Communal Living, which had been split off from the Ministry of Regional Development and Construction.)

Deputy Prime Minister of Ukraine
- In office 21 March 2007 – 18 December 2007
- Prime Minister: Viktor Yanukovych

2nd Mayor of Donetsk
- In office September 1993 – 31 March 2002
- Preceded by: Yukhym Zvyahilsky
- Succeeded by: Oleksandr Lukyanchenko

Leader of Party of Regional Revival of Ukraine
- In office October 1997 – 2001
- Preceded by: Position established
- Succeeded by: Mykola Azarov
Parliamentary positions
People's Deputy of Ukraine
In office 12 December 2012 – 27 November 2014
Constituency	Party of Regions, No. 10^{[A]}
In office 23 November 2007 – 12 December 2012
Constituency	Party of Regions, No. 13^{[A]}
In office 25 May 2006 – 12 September 2006
Constituency	Party of Regions, No. 13^{[A]}
In office 14 May 2002 – 25 May 2006
Succeeded by	Constituency abolished
Constituency	Donetsk Oblast, No. 45
In office 12 May 1998 – 14 May 2002
Preceded by	Oleksandr Kozhushko (Note: Oleksandr Kozhushko represented the same area in Donetsk Oblast, but during the 2nd convocation (1994–1998) it was numbered as Constituency No. 145, and not No. 45. Constituency No. 45 was instead assigned to the special city of Sevastopol, with Anatoliy Yurkovskyi representing it during that convocation. In 1997, just before the 1998 elections, the Verkhovna Rada switched the numbering system for constituencies, moving Donetsk Oblast constituencies to lower numbers rather than in the hundreds.)
Constituency	Donetsk Oblast, No. 45

Personal details
- Born: Volodymyr Vasylyovych Rybak; October 3, 1946 (age 80) Stalino, Ukrainian SSR, Soviet Union (now Donetsk)
- Party: Communist Party of the Soviet Union (until 1991); Party of Regions (1997–2014)
- Education: Donetsk State University (1973, 1996, 2001)
- A. Party-list proportional representation seat.

Volodymyr Vasylyovych Rybak (Ukrainian: Володимир Васильович Рибак; born 3 October 1946) is a Ukrainian politician. He was the Chairman of the Verkhovna Rada from 13 December 2012 to 22 February 2014. Volodymyr Rybak is also the original leader of the predecessor of the Party of Regions, the Party of Regional Revival of Ukraine. He is a Merited Builder of Ukraine (1995).

== Biography ==
Born in Stalino (now Donetsk), Rybak graduated from the Department of Economy at Donetsk State University in 1973, eventually receiving a doctorate in economics. He served as chairman of the city council, executive committee and mayor of Donetsk from 1993 to 2002. Rybak was co-organizer and first chairman of the Party of Regions between 1997 and 2001. In the 2002 parliamentary elections Rybak was elected into the Verkhovna Rada (Ukrainian parliament), he was reelected in the 2006, 2007 Ukrainian parliamentary election and 2012 parliamentary election. In 2012 he was placed tenth on the national party list of Party of Regions.

Rybak was Vice Premier of Ukraine and Construction, Architecture and Housing and Utility minister (August 4, 2006 till March 21, 2007) and Vice Premier of Ukraine (March 21, 2007 till December 18, 2007) in the Second Yanukovych Government.

On 13 December 2012 (following the 2012 Ukrainian parliamentary election) he was elected Chairman of the Verkhovna Rada. He resigned on 22 February 2014 citing ill health and amidst the "2014 Ukrainian revolution".

Rybak did not participate in the 2014 Ukrainian parliamentary election, nor in the 2019 Ukrainian parliamentary election.

== See also ==
- List of mayors of Donetsk

== Bibliography ==
- Кузин, Сергей (2006). Донецкая мафия [Donetsk Mafia]. Полиграфкнига.
- Казанський, Денис (2020). Як Україна втрачала Донбас [How Ukraine Lost the Donbas]. Книжкове видавництво Чорна гора.

Party political offices
New office	Leader of the Party of Regions; 1997-2001	Succeeded by Mykola Azarov
Political offices
Preceded by Volodymyr Lytvyn	Chairman of the Verkhovna Rada; 2012-2014	Succeeded by Oleksandr Turchynov
Preceded by Pavlo Kachur	Minister of Construction, Architecture, and Public Housing and Utilities; 2006-2007	Succeeded by Volodymyr Yatsuba; Oleksandr Popov
Preceded by Yukhym Zvyahilsky	Mayor of Donetsk; 1993–2002	Succeeded by Oleksandr Lukyanchenko
