= Kyivskyi District =

Kyivskyi District (Ukrainian: Київський район) may refer to the following places in Ukraine:

- Kyivskyi District, Donetsk
- Kyivskyi District, Kharkiv
- Kyivskyi District, Odesa
- Kyivskyi District, Poltava
- Kyivskyi District, Simferopol
