= Oplot =

Oplot may refer to:

- BM Oplot, a Ukrainian main battle tank
- Oplot Brigade, a unit of the Donetsk People's Militia and later the Russian military
- Oplot (Plzeň-South District), a municipality and village in the Czech Republic
