= Donetsk City Council =

Donetsk City Council Донецька міська рада

Type
- Type: Unicameral

History
- Founded: 1991
- Disbanded: 2014 (temporarily suspended)

Leadership
- Chairman: Vacant

Structure
- Seats: 90
- Political groups: Following the 2010 Ukrainian local elections: Party of Regions (85); Communist Party of Ukraine (3); Strong Ukraine (2)
- Length of term: 5 years

Elections
- Voting system: Proportional representation
- Last election: October 31, 2010
- Next election: Unscheduled (due to Russian occupation)

Meeting place
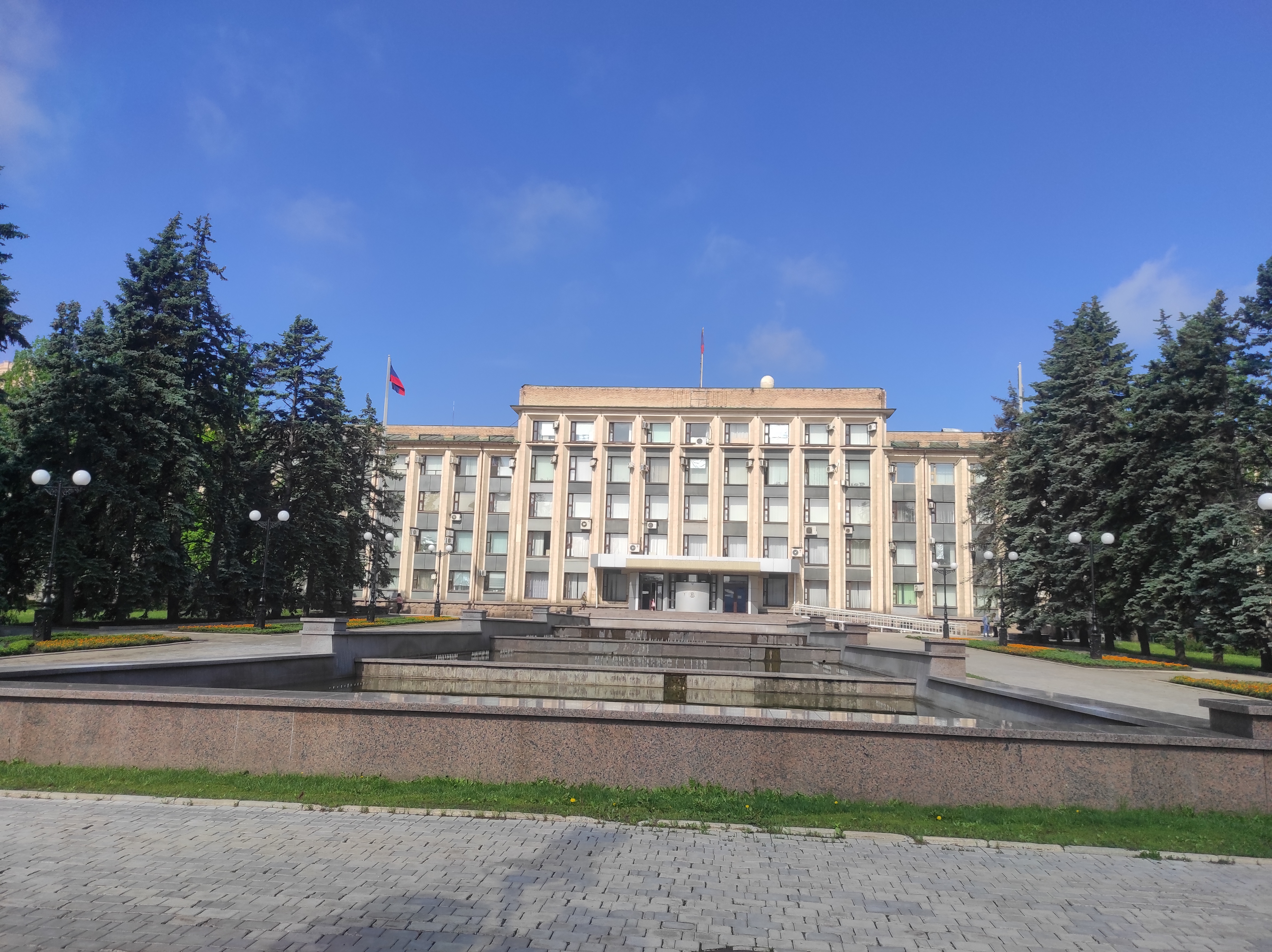
- 98 Artema Street, Donetsk; 48°00′57″N 37°48′05″E

Donetsk City Council (Ukrainian: Донецька міська рада) is the municipal council governing the Ukrainian city of Donetsk. The council has been temporarily suspended since 2014 due to the War in Donbas and subsequent Russian occupation of the city.

== Leadership ==
Until its suspension in 2014, the city council was headed by the elected mayor of Donetsk, Oleksandr Lukyanchenko. He has been in exile in Kyiv since July 2014.
