= Alexey Kulemzin =

Ukrainian politician, de facto mayor of Donetsk

- Алексей Кулемзин; Олексій Кулемзін
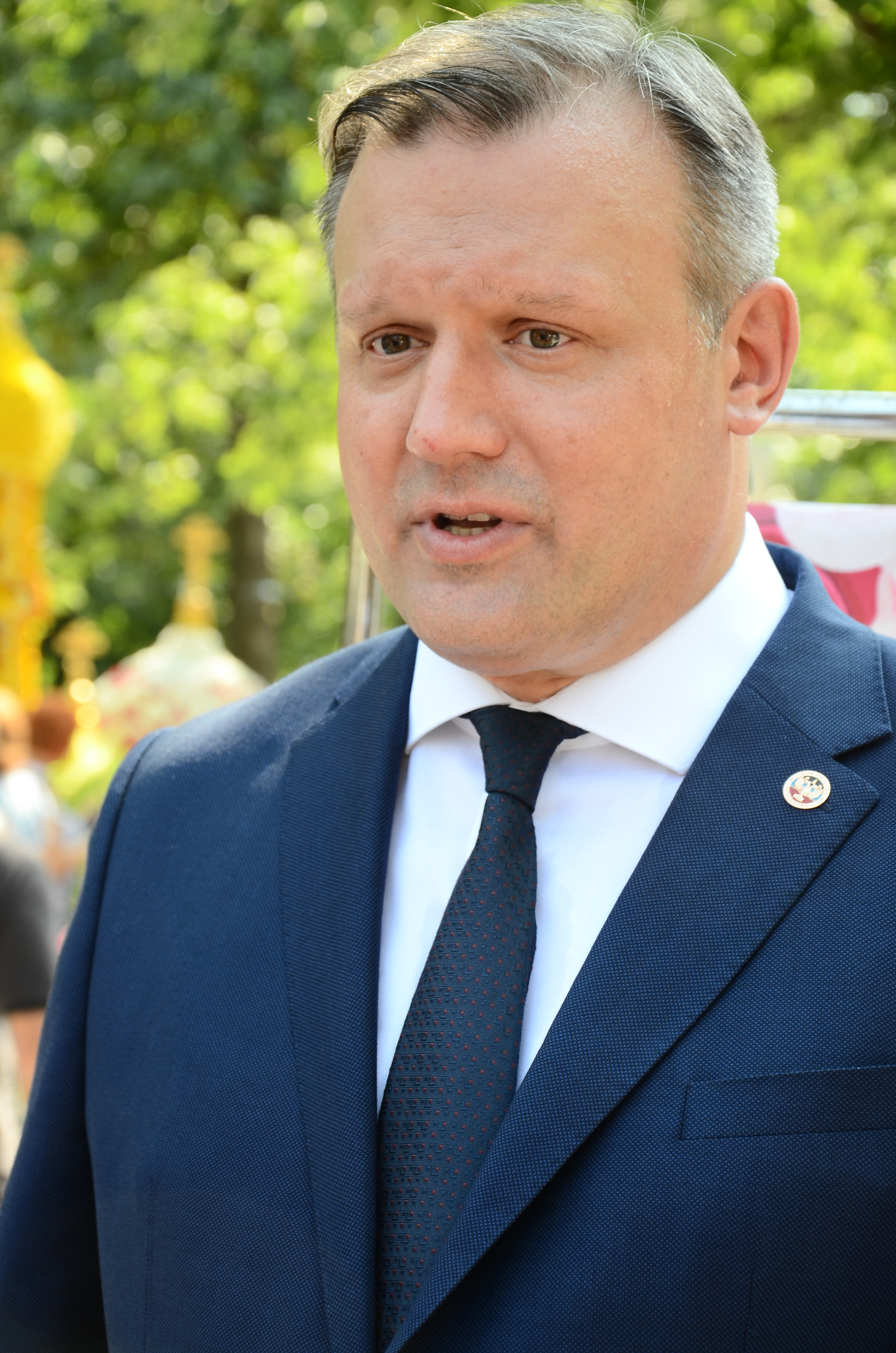
- Kulemzin in 2021

Mayor of Donetsk
- Incumbent
- Assumed office 17 October 2016
- Preceded by: Igor Martynov

Personal details
- Born: 13 September 1974 (age 52) Donetsk, Ukrainian SSR, Soviet Union
- Party: United Russia
- Education: Donetsk National University

Alexey Valeryevich Kulemzin (Russian: Алексей Валерьевич Кулемзин, Ukrainian: Олексій Валерійович Кулемзін, romanized: Oleksii Valeriiovych Kulemzin; born 13 June 1974) is a Russo-Ukrainian politician and collaborator who serves as Mayor of Donetsk since 2016.

== Biography ==
Between 2007 and 2010, he was Head of the Department for Foreign Economic Relations and European Integration of the Donetsk Regional State Administration. Later, between 2011 and 2013, he was the Deputy Head of the Department for Regional Development, Attraction of Investment and Foreign Economic Relations.

On 17 October 2016, the Head of the unrecognized Donetsk People's Republic Alexander Zakharchenko appointed Kulemzin as acting Mayor of Donetsk.
