= Names of European cities in different languages (C–D) =

Different names for European cities in neighbouring languages

The names used for some major European cities differ in different European and sometimes non-European languages. In some countries where there are two or more languages spoken, such as Belgium or Switzerland, dual forms may be used within the city itself, for example on signage. This is also the case in Ireland, despite a low level of actual usage of the Irish language. In other cases where a regional language is officially recognised, that form of the name may be used in the region, but not nationally. Examples include the Welsh language in Wales in the United Kingdom, and parts of Italy and Spain.

There is a slow trend to return to the local name, which has been going on for a long time. In English Livorno is now used, the old English form of Leghorn having become antiquated at least a century ago. In some cases, such as the replacement of Danzig with Gdańsk, the official name has been changed more recently. Since 1995, the government of Ukraine has encouraged the use of Kyiv rather than Kiev.

== C ==
English name	Other names or former names
(Slovakia) Čadca	Čadca (Slovak*), Çаdtsа (Azerbaijani*), Csaca (Hungarian*), Czadca (Polish*), Tschadsa (German*)
(Spain) Cádiz	Agadir – 𐤀𐤂𐤃𐤓 (Phoenician), al-Qādis – قادس (Arabic*), Cadice (Italian*), Cadis (Catalan*), Cádis (Portuguese*), Cadix (French*), Cadiz (German*, Romanian*), Cádiz (Spanish*), Gádeira – Γάδειρα (Ancient Greek*), Gēdeira – Γήδειρα (Ionian Greek*), Jiādesī – 加的斯 (Chinese*), Kadij – কাডিজ (Bengali*), Kadis – Кадис (Russian*), Kadiseu / K'adisŭ – 카디스 (Korean*), Kadisu – カディス (Japanese*), Kadiz (Albanian, Basque*, Ladino*, Maltese), Kadiz – Кадиз (Serbian*), Kadizo (Esperanto*), Kadyks (Polish*), Gàdé'ěr - 噶德尔 (Mandarin), Κάδιθ (Greek*), Gades (Latin*)
(Italy) Cagliari	Cagliari (Dutch*, Italian*, Finnish*, Spanish*, Romanian*), Càller (Aragonese*, Catalan*), Calyér (Arpitan), Caralis (Latin*), Casteddu (Sardinian*), Kagliari (Ladino*), Kaljari (Albanian, Maltese), Kaljari – Каљари (Serbian*)
(Spain) Calahorra	Calagorra (Aragonese*), Calagurris (Latin*), Calahorra (Dutch*, French*, Spanish*), Kalaora – Калаора (Serbian*)
(France) Calais	Cales (archaic English, archaic German, archaic Italian), Calés (Ch'timi/Picard*, archaic Spanish*), Calêsio (archaic Portuguese), Callice (archaic English), Galèih - 加萊/加來 (Cantonese*), Jiālái - 加萊 (Mandarin Chinese*), Kalae - กาแล (Thai*), Kalaí - Καλαί (Greek*), Ka-lâi - 加萊 (Hokkien), Kalais - कलैस (Hindi), Kālayh - كاليه (Arabic*), Kale (Azeri*, Uzbek*), K'ale – კალე (Georgian), Kale – Кале (Russian^{[KNAB]}*, Serbian*, Ukrainian*), Kalē (Latvian*), Kalė (Lithuanian*), Kālē - কালে (Bengali*), Kalen (archaic German*), Kales (Dutch alternative^{[KNAB]}*, West Flemish), Kalle - 칼레 (Korean*), Karē (Japanese*), Calesium (Latin*)
(France) Cambrai	Camaracum (Latin*), Cambrai (French*, German*), Cambraia (Portuguese), Camerick or Camericke (historical English*), Kambre – Камбре (Serbian*), Kambryk or Kamerich (former German*), Kamerijk (Dutch*), Kimbré (Picard*), Kameryk (Afrikaans*)
(United Kingdom) (England) Cambridge	Caergrawnt (Welsh*), Cantabrigia (Latin*), Cantabrígia or Cambrígia (Portuguese, rare*), Duroliponte or Durolipons (Roman Latin*), Jiān qiáo – 劍橋 (Chinese*), Kāngqiáo – 康橋 (former Chinese), Kantavrigía – Κανταβριγία (Greek Katharevousa), Kéimbridz – Κέιμπριτζ (Greek*), Keimbeuriji / K'eimbŭriji – 케임브리지 (Korean), Kembridž – Кембриџ (Serbian*), Kembridža (Latvian*), Kembridžas (Lithuanian*), Kembriĝo (Esperanto*), Kemburijji – ケンブリッジ (Japanese*), Kergront (Cornish), Keymbrige – קיימברידג (Hebrew*)
(Romania) Câmpulung Moldovenesc	Câmpulung (Romanian, pre-1950*), Câmpulung Bucovina (alternative Romanian*), Câmpulung Moldovenesc (Romanian*), Cîmpulung Moldovenesc (Romanian, 1953–93 orthography), Dołhopole (archaic Polish), Dovhopillya – Довгопілля (Ukrainian), Kimpolung (German*), Kimpulung (German*), Kimpulung – קאָמפּעלונג (Yiddish), Kimpulung Mołdawski (Polish*), Kimpulung Moldovanesk – Кимпулунг Молдованеск (Serbian*), Kympolung – Кимполунґ (Ukrainian),^{[KNAB]} Hosszúmező (Hungarian),^{[KNAB]} Moldvahosszúmező (Hungarian*)
(United Kingdom) (England) Canterbury	Caer-Cant (Saxon), Caergaint (Welsh*), Cantorbéry (French*), Cantuaria (Latin*), Cantuária (Portuguese*), Durovernum Cantiacorum (Roman Latin*), Kaenteoberi / K'aent'ŏberi – 캔터베리 (Korean), Kantaraborg (Icelandic*), Kǎntèbèiléi – 坎特貝雷 (Chinese*), Kenterberi – Кентербери (Serbian), Kenterberija (Latvian*), Kantelberg (Dutch*), Kergent (Cornish)
(France) Carcassonne	Carcassona (Catalan*, Italian*, Occitan*, Portuguese*), Carcasona (Spanish*), Carcassonne (Finnish*, French*), Iulia Carcaso or Carcaso (Latin*), Karkason – Каркасон (Serbian*)
(United Kingdom) (Wales) Cardiff	Caerdydd (Welsh*, Irish*, Scottish Gaelic), Cardife or Cardívio (Portuguese, rare*), Kādifu – カーディフ (Japanese*), Kadipeu / K'adip'ŭ – 카디프 (Korean), Kardif – Кардиф (Serbian*), Kārdifa (Latvian*), Kardip (Tagalog*), Cardiffa (Latin*)
(United Kingdom) (England) Carlisle	Caerliwelydd (Welsh*), Cathair Luail (Irish, Scottish Gaelic*), Karlajl – Карлајл (Serbian), Luguvalium (Roman Latin), Lùgǔwǎlì - 鹿古瓦利 (Mandarin), Carleolum (Latin*)
(Czech Republic) Carlsbad (Karlovy Vary)	Karlovi Vari (Bulgarian*, Croatian*, Romanian*), Karlove Vari – Карлове Вари (Serbian*), Karlovy Vary (Czech*, Turkish*), Karlowe Wary (Polish*), Karlsbad (Dutch*, German*, Swedish*), Karlsbāde (Latvian*), Károlyfürdő (Hungarian), Thermae Carolinae (Latin*)
(United Kingdom) (Wales) Carmarthen	Caerfyrddin (Welsh), Carmarthen (English), Moridunum (Latin)
Cartagena (Spain)	al-Qartājanna (Arabic), Cartagena (Catalan*, Dutch*, Portuguese*, Spanish*), Cartagina (Romanian*), Carthagène (French*), Carthago Nova (Latin*), Kartagina (Polish*), Kartaġni (Maltese), Kartahena – Картахена (Serbian*), Kartaxena (Azeri*), Karthagéni – Καρθαγένη (Greek*), QRT𐤟ḤDŠT - 𐤒𐤓𐤕𐤟𐤇𐤃𐤔𐤕 (Phoenician/Punic), Xīn Jiātàijī - 新迦太基 (Mandarin)
(Italy) Castelsardo	Calteddu* or Caltheddu Saldhu (local dialect), Caltheddu (Corsican), Castheddu Sardhu (Sassarese*), Casteddu Sardu (Sardinian*), Castel Aragonés (former Catalan, 1448–1767*), Castelgenovese (former Italian, 1102–1448*), Castelsardo (Italian*), Castillo Aragonés (former Spanish, 1448–1767*), Castrum Aragonense or Castrum Aragoniense (Latin, since 1448*), Castrum Ianuae or Castrum Ianuense (older Latin, 1102–1448), Emporiae (older Latin*), Kastelsardo – Кастелсардо (Serbian)
(Italy) Catania	Catane (French*), Catânia (Portuguese*), Katanja (Maltese*) Katanya (Turkish*), Katánia – Κατάνια (Greek*)
(Slovenia) Celje	Celeia (Latin*), Celje – Цеље (Serbian*), Celje (Slovene*), Cille (Hungarian*), Cilli (older English*, German*), Kelea (Celtic), Cilli or Celie (Italian*)
(Czech Republic) České Budějovice	Budweis (Dutch*, former English*, German*), České Budějovice (Czech*, Slovak*), Češke Budjejovice – Чешке Будјејовице (Serbian*), Cheseuki Budeyobiche / Ch'esŭk'i Pudeyobich'e – 체스키 부데요비체 (Korean), Ches'ke-Budejovyce – Чеське-Будєйовіце (Ukrainian), Czeskie Budziejowice (Polish*), Budvicium or Budovicium (Latin*)
(Czech Republic) Český Těšín	Český Těšín (Czech*), Češki Tješin – Чешки Тјешин (Serbian*), Ches'ky-Teshyn – Чеські-Тешин (Ukrainian), Czeski Cieszyn (Polish*), Tschechisch-Teschen (German*)
(Latvia) Cēsis	Cesis – Цэсіс (Belarusian*), Cēsis (Latvian*),^{[KNAB]}, Cesis – Цесис (Serbian*) Cėsys (Lithuanian),^{[KNAB]} Kes – Кесь (archaic Russian*), Kėsys (archaic Lithuanian),^{[KNAB]} Kieś (Polish*),^{[KNAB]} Tsesis – Цесис (Russian*),^{[KNAB]} Tsesis – Цесіс (Ukrainian*), Wenden (German*),^{[KNAB]} Venden (Livonian), Venden – Венденъ (archaic Russian),^{[KNAB]} Venden – Венден (archaic Ukrainian), Võnnu (Estonian*)^{[KNAB]}
(Montenegro) Cetinje	Cettigne (Italian*), Çetine (Turkish), Cetinje – Цетиње (Serbian*), Cetinje (Slovene), Cetynia (Polish*), Ketígni – Κετίγνη (Greek*), Cetinë (Albanian*), Cetinia (Latin)
Chalkida (Greece)	Cálcis or Cálcida (Portuguese*), Calcide (Italian*), Chalkida (German*), Chalkída – Χαλκίδα (Modern Greek*), Chalcis (French*, Latin*), Chalkis (older German*), Chalkís – Χαλκίς (Ancient Greek, Greek Katharevousa*), Halkida – Халкида (Serbian*), Khalkis (Finnish), Negroponte (medieval Italian)
(France) Chambéry	Chamberí (old Spanish), Chambéry (Dutch, French, German), Sciamberì (old Italian), Šamberi – Шамбери (Serbian*)
(Greece) Chania	Chaniá – Χανιά (Greek*), Hania (Finnish*, Romanian*), Hanja – Хања (Serbian*), Hanya (Turkish), Kudonija - 𐀓𐀈𐀛𐀊 (Mycenaean Greek), Kydonia - Κυδωνία (Ancient Greek), La Canea (Catalan*, Italian*, Spanish*), La Canée (French*),
(Belgium) Charleroi	Charleroi (Dutch*, Finnish*, French*, German, Romanian*), Châlerwè (alternative Walloon), Karelskoning (alternative Dutch), Karloreĝo (Esperanto*), Karolingen (former German), Šarleruā (Latvian*), Šarlroa – Шарлроа (Serbian*), Sharleroah – שרלרואה (Hebrew*), Sharururowa – シャルルロワ (Japanese*), Tchålerwè (Walloon*)
(Belgium) Châtelet	Châtelet (French*), Castellarium (Latin*), Šatlė (Lithuanian), Tcheslet (Walloon*)
(Czech Republic) Cheb	Cheb (Czech*), Eger (German*), Heb – Хеб (Serbian*)
(Poland) Chełmno	Chełmno (Polish*), Culm (variant in German*), Helmno (Latvian*), Helmno – Хелмно (Serbian*), Khelmno – Хелмно (Russian*, Ukrainian*), Kulm (German*), Kulmas (Lithuanian*)
(Germany) Chemnitz	Chemnitz (German*, Finnish*, Romanian*), Chemnicium (Latin*), Kamienica Saska (Polish, historical, obsolete*), Kamjenica (Sorbian), Kemnic – Кемниц (Serbian*), Saská Kamenice (Czech, old*), Karl-Marx-Stadt (German, 1953–1990*)
(Ukraine) Chernihiv	Chernigov – Чернигов (Russian*), Černigov – Чернигов (Serbian*), Chernihiv – Чернігів (Ukrainian*), Chernihivi – ჩერნიჰივი (Georgian*), Czernihów (Polish), Tschernigow (obsolete German*), Tschernihiw (German*), Tšernihiv (Finnish)
(Ukraine) Chernivtsi	Čarnaŭcy – Чарнаўцы (Belarusian*), Cernăuţi (Romanian*),^{[KNAB]} Černivci – Чернивци (Serbian*), Černovcai (Lithuanian),^{[KNAB]} Černovice (Czech*,^{[KNAB]} Slovak*^{[KNAB]}), Chernivtsi – ჩერნივცი (Georgian*), Chernivtsi – Чернівці (Ukrainian*),^{[KNAB]} Chernovitsy – Черновицы (Russian, before 1944*),^{[KNAB]} Chernovitz – צ'רנוביץ (Hebrew*), Chernovtsi – Черновци (Bulgarian*), Chernovtsy – Черновцы (Russian*),^{[KNAB]} Chernovytsi – Черновиці (Ukrainian, before 1944),^{[KNAB]} Csernivci or Csernovic (Hungarian variants), Csernyivci (Hungarian*), Czerniowce (Polish*),^{[KNAB]} Czernovicensia (Ecclesiastical Latin), Czernowitz (German*),^{[KNAB]} Tchernivtsi (French*), Tjernivtsi (Swedish*), Tschernowitz (German variant*), Tšernivtsi (Finnish), Tshernovits – טשערנאָוויץ (Yiddish*), Tsjernivtsi (Norwegian [Nynorsk* and Bokmål*)
(Ukraine) Chernobyl	Cernobâl (Romanian variant*), Çernobıl (Azeri*), Çernobil (Turkish*), Cernobil, Černobyl'* or Čornobyl' (Italian), Cernobîl (Romanian*), Černobil (Slovene*), Černobilj – Чернобиљ (Serbian*), Černobyl (Czech*), Černobyľ (Slovak*), Chernobil or Chernóbil (Portuguese variants*), Chernobyl – Чернобыль (Russian*), Cherunobuiri – チェルノブイリ (Japanese*), Choreunobil / Ch'orŭnobil – 초르노빌 (Korean), Chornobyl – Чорнобиль (Ukrainian*), Csernobil (Hungarian*), Czarnobyl (Polish*), Qièěrnuòpéiěr – 切爾諾貝爾 (Chinese*), Searnóbail (Irish), Tchernobil or Tchernóbil (Portuguese variants*), Tchernobyl (French*), Tjernobyl (Swedish*), Tschernobyl or Tschornobyl (German*), Tšernobyl (Finnish), Tšernobõl (Estonian*)
(Russia) Chernyakhovsk	Černiachovskas (Lithuanian*), Cernihovsk (Romanian*), Černjahovsk – Черњаховск (Serbian), Chernyakhovsk (Russian*), Insterburg (German*), Įsrutis (Lithuanian*), Tšernjahovsk (Finnish), Wystruć (Polish*)
(United Kingdom) (England) Chester	Caerllion-ar-Dyfrdwy usually abbreviated to Caer, Historically also known as Deverdoeu (Welsh*), Castra Devana or Deva (Roman Latin), Čester – Честер (Serbian), Cestria (Latin*)
(Belgium) Chièvres	Cervia (Latin*), Chieuve (Picard*), Chieve (Walloon*), Chièvres (French*)
(Belgium) Chimay	Chimai (Picard*, Walloon*), Chimay (French*), Cimaium (Latin), Šimē (Latvian)
(Belgium) Chiny	Chiniacum (Latin), Chiny (French*), Tchini (Walloon*)
(Italy) Chiusi	Camars (Umbrian) Chiusi (Italian), Clevsin (Etruscan), Clusium (Latin), Klysion - Κλύσιον (Ancient Greek)
(Moldova) Chișinău	Chișinău (Catalan*, Finnish*, French*, German*, Portuguese*, Romanian*), Chisinau (Dutch*, Finnish variant*, Portuguese variant*, Spanish*), Císineá (Irish), Keshenev – קעשענעװ (Yiddish*), Kichinev (French variant*), Kischinau (German variant*), Kischinew (German variant*), Kishinau – キシナウ (Japanese*), Kishinev (former English*), Kishinev – קישינב (Hebrew*), K'ishiniovi – კიშინიოვი (Georgian*), Kishinjov – Кишинёв (Russian*), Kīšīnāw (Arabic), Kišineu (Bulgarian), Kišiněv (Czech*), Kişinev (Turkish*), Kišiņeva (Latvian*), Kišiniovas (Lithuanian*), Kišinjev (Bosnian*, Croatian*, Finnish alternate, Slovene*), Kišinjev – Кишињев (Serbian*), Kišiňov (Slovak*), Kişinyov (Azeri), Kisinyov (Hungarian*), Kisjenő (older Hungarian*), Kisnóvio – Κισνόβιο (Greek), Kiszyniów (Polish*), Kyshyniv – Кишинів (Ukrainian*), Quichinau or Quixinau (Portuguese variants*), Quixineve (Portuguese, obsolete*)
(Poland) Chorzów	Chorzów (Polish*), Hojūfu – ホジューフ (Japanese*), Hožaŭ – Гожаў (Belarusian*), Hožov – Хожов (Serbian), Khozhiv – Хожів (Ukrainian*), Khozhuv – Хожув (Russian*), Königshütte (German*), Chořov (Czech *), Królewska Huta (Polish, until 1934*)
(Switzerland) Chur	Chur (Dutch, German), Coira (Italian*), Coire (French*), Cuira (Romansh*), Curia Raetorum (Latin*), Hur – Хур (Serbian*)
(Slovakia) Čierna nad Tisou	Černa pie Tisas (Latvian*), Čierna nad Tisou (Slovak*), Chierna-nad-Tisoyu – Чєрна-над-Тісою (Ukrainian*), Čjerna na Tisi – Чјерна на Тиси (Serbian), Czerna nad Cisą (Polish*) Tiszacsernyő (Hungarian*)
(Poland) Cieszyn	Cieszyn (Polish*), Teschen (Dutch*, German*), Těšín (Czech*), Tešín (Slovak*), Tessium (Latin*), Tješin – Тјешин (Serbian), Tseshin – Цешин (Russian*, Ukrainian*)
(Belgium) Ciney	Chiney (archaic English*), Cînè (Walloon*), Ciney (French*)
(France) Clermont-Ferrand	Augustonemetum (Latin*), Clarmont (Occitan*), Clermonte (Spanish*), Klermon Feran – Клермон Феран (Serbian*)
(Germany) Cleves	Cléveris (Spanish*), Clèves (French*), Cleves (Portuguese*), Clivia (Latin), Kleef (Dutch*), Kleve (German*), Kleve – Клеве (Serbian)
(Romania) Cluj-Napoca	Claudiopolis (Latin*), Cluj (French*, Romanian*,informal), Cluj-Napoca (Dutch*, formal Romanian*), Kaloşvar (Turkish*), Klausenburg (German*), Kluž (Czech*, Slovak*), Kluż (Polish*), K'luzh-nap'ok'a – კლუჟ-ნაპოკა (Georgian*), Kluž-Napoka – Клуж-Напока (Serbian*), Kolozsvár (Hungarian*), Keullujinapoka / K'ŭllujinap'ok'a – 클루지나포카 (Korean*), Napoca (Classical Latin)
(Republic of Ireland) Cobh	An Cóbh (Irish*), Kov – Ков (Serbian), Queenstown or Cove (former English*)
(Germany) Coblenz	Coblença (Portuguese*), Coblence (French*), Coblenza (Italian*, Spanish*), Confluentes (Latin*), Koblenc – Кобленц (Serbian*), Koblencja (Polish*), Koblenz (Dutch*, Finnish*, German*, Romanian*, Slovene*), Koblenza (Maltese*), Kueblenz (Luxembourgish*)
(Germany) Coburg	Cobourg (French*), Coburg (Dutch*, German*), Coburgo (Italian*, Portuguese*, Spanish), Koburg – Кобург (Serbian), Kovoúrgon – Κοβούργον (Greek Katharevousa*)
(Netherlands) Coevorden	Coevern (Low Saxon*), Coevorden (Dutch*), Kuvordenas (Lithuanian)
(Portugal) Coimbra	Coimbra (Finnish*, Italian*, Portuguese*, Romanian*, Spanish*), Coïmbra (Catalan*) Coimbre (French*), Conimbriga (Latin*), Koimbeura / K'oimbŭra – 코임브라 (Korean), Koimbra – Коимбра (Serbian*), Qulumriya (Arabic)
(United Kingdom) (England) Colchester	Camulodunum (Roman Latin), Camulodunon (British), Kolčester – Колчестер (Serbian), Colcestria (Latin*)
(Germany) Cologne	Cöln (older German variant*), Cologne (French*), Colònia (Catalan*), Colonia (Italian*, Spanish*), Colónia (Portuguese*), Cołonia (Venetian*), Colonia Agrippina (Latin*), Cwlen (Welsh*), Keln – קלן (Hebrew*), Keln – Келн (Macedonian*, Serbian*), Kel'n – Кельн (Ukrainian*), Keln – קעלן (Yiddish*), Kelnas (Lithuanian*), Ķelne (Latvian*), Kèlóng 科隆 (Chinese*), Kerun – ケルン (Japanese*), Keulen (Afrikaans*, Dutch*, West Frisian*), Kjol'n – Кёльн (Russian*), Koelleun / K'oellŭn – 쾰른 (Korean*), Kolín nad Rýnem (Czech*), Kolín nad Rýnom (Slovak*), Kölle (Cologne Ripuarian dialect*, Köln (Azeri*, Estonian*, Finnish*, German*, Hungarian*, Icelandic*, Romanian*, Swedish*, Turkish*), K'oln – Кьолн (Bulgarian*), Kolon – कोलोन (Marathi*), Kolon – โคโลญ (Thai*), Kolonia (Basque*, Polish*), Kolonía – Κολωνία (Greek*), Kolonja (Maltese), Kūlūniya – كولوني (Arabic*), Køln (Danish*, Norwegian*)
(Romania) Comănești	Comăneşti (Romanian*), Komanešti – Команешти (Serbian*), Kománfalva (Hungarian*)
(Belgium) Comines-Warneton	Cômene-Varneton (Walloon*), Comène-Warneuton (Picard*), Comines-Warneton (French*), Comineum et Varnetonium (Latin), Komen-Waasten (Dutch*, Limburgish*), Kominas-Varnetonas (Lithuanian*), Koomn-Woastn (West Flemish*), Koom'n-Waost'n (Zeelandic*)
(Italy) Como	Côme (French*), Comum or Novum Comum (Latin*), Cum (Romansh), Komo – Комо (Serbian*)
(Romania) Constanța	Constança (Brazilian Portuguese*), Constanța (Finnish*, Romanian*), Konstanz or Konstanza (German*), Kanstanca – Канстанца (Belarusian*), Konstanca (Hungarian*, Polish*, Slovak*), Konstanca – Констанца (Russian*, Serbian*, Ukrainian*), K'onst'antsa – კონსტანცა (Georgian*), Köstence (Turkish*), Kyustendzha – Кюстенджа (Bulgarian*), Tomis (Latin*)
(Denmark) Copenhagen	Beirbh (Scottish Gaelic, obsolete), Cóbanhávan (Irish*), Copenaghen (Italian*), Copenhaga (Portuguese*, Romanian*), Copenhague (Brazilian Portuguese*, Catalan*, French*, Spanish*), Gēběnhāgēn – 哥本哈根 (Chinese*), Hafnia (Latin*), Kaufmannshafen (old German*), Kaupmannahöfn (Icelandic*), Keappenhaven (alternate West Frisian*), Keypmannahavn (Faroese*), Kobenhaven (Slovene*), København (Danish*, Norwegian*), Kodaň (Czech*, Slovak*), Kööpenhamina (Finnish*), Kopencháyi – Κοπεγχάγη (Greek*), Kopengagen (Russian*), Kopenhaagen (Estonian*), Kopenhag (Turkish*), Kopenhaga (Lithuanian*, Polish *), Kopenhagë (Albanian*), Kopenhagen (Azeri*, Croatian*, Dutch*, German*), Kopenhagen – Копенхаген or Kupimore – Купиморе (Bulgarian*, Serbian*), Kopenhagen – קופנהגן (Hebrew*), Kopenhāgen – コペンハーゲン (Japanese*), Kopenhagen / K'op'enhagen – 코펜하겐 (Korean), Kopenħagen (Maltese), Kopenhāgena (Latvian*), K'op'enhageni – კოპენჰაგენი (Georgian*), Kopenhago (Esperanto*), Köpenhamn (Swedish*), Koppenhága (Hungarian*), Kūbinhāġin (Arabic*), Kuupenhuuwen (North Frisian)
(Spain) Cordova	Cordoba (Dutch*, German*, Romanian*), Córdoba (Spanish*, Finnish*), Corduba (Latin*), Cordoue (French*), Còrdova (Catalan*), Cordova (English, Interlingua, Italian*, former Romanian*), Córdova (Portuguese*), Kordhoúi – Κορδούη (Greek Katharevousa*), Kórdhova – Κόρδοβα (Demotic Greek*), Kordoba – קורדובה (Hebrew*), Kordoba – Кордоба (Serbian*), Kordoba (Slovene*), Kordova or Qurtuba (Azeri*), Kordova (Latvian*, Ladino *), Kordowa (Polish*), Ladino alternate), Koreudoba / K'orŭdoba – 코르도바 (Korean), Korudoba – コルドバ (Japanese*), Qurtubah (Arabic)
(Greece) Corfu	Corcira or Corfu (Portuguese*, Romanian*), Corcyra (Latin*), Corcyre (French alternate under Napoleonic rule*), Corfou (French*), Corfù (Italian*), Corfú (Catalan*, Irish, Spanish*), Kérkira – Κέρκυρα (Greek*), Kerkira – Керкира (Russian*), Koreupu / Korŭp'u – 코르푸 (Korean), Korfoe or Corfu (Dutch*), Korfu (Finnish*, German*, Hungarian*, Ladino, Polish*, Slovak*, Swedish*, Turkish*), Korfu – Корфу (Bulgarian*), Korfù (Maltese), Krf (Croatian*, Slovene*), Krf – Крф (Macedonian*, Serbian*), Korfuz (Albanian*)
(Greece) Corinth	Corint (Catalan*, Romanian*), Corinthe (French*), Corinthus (Latin*), Corintus (Scottish Gaelic, archaic), Corinto (Italian*, Portuguese*, Spanish*), Karynf – Карынф (Belarusian*), Korinf (Azeri*), Korinf – Коринф (Russian*, Ukrainian*), Korint – Коринт (Bulgarian*, Serbian*), Korint (Croatian*, Czech*, Slovak*, Slovene*, Turkish*), Kórinta (Icelandic*), Korinta (Latvian*), Korintas (Lithuanian*), Korinth (Danish*, German*, Swedish*), Korinthe (Dutch*), Kórinthos – Κόρινθος (Greek*), Korinti (Albanian), Korintosz (Hungarian*), Korintti (Finnish*), Korintu (Maltese), Korynt (Polish*)
(Republic of Ireland) Cork	Corc (Welsh*), Corcagia (Latin*), Corcaigh (Irish, Scottish Gaelic*), Cork (Danish*, Dutch*, German*, Italian*, Spanish*, Swedish*), Koreukeu / K'orŭk'ŭ – 코르크 (Korean), Kork (Azeri*), Kork – Корк (Serbian*), Korka (Latvian*), Kuò'ěrkǎihè - 阔尔凯赫 (Mandarin)
(France) Corte	Corte (Dutch*, German*, French*, Italian*), Corti (Corsican*), Korte – Корте (Serbian)
(Italy) Cortona	Cortona (Latin, Italian), Curtun - 𐌂𐌖𐌓𐌕𐌖𐌍 (Etruscan)
(Spain) Corunna	A Coruña (Galician*), La Coruña (Spanish*, Dutch*, Finnish*), Corùna (Scottish Gaelic), Corunha (Portuguese*), Korunja – Коруња (Serbian*), La Corogne (French*), La Coruna (Romanian*), Lakoruņa (Latvian*), La Korunya (Ladino*), Rakorūnya – ラ・コルーニャ (Japanese*)
(Germany) Cottbus	Chociebuż (Polish*), Chóśebuz (Sorbian), Chotěbuz (Czech*), Chotebuz (archaic Slovak*), Cottbus (German*), Kotbus – Котбус (Serbian*), Kottbus (archaic German*)
(Belgium) Couvin	Couvén (Walloon*), Couvéne (Picard*), Couvin (French*)
(France) Crécy	Crécy-en-Ponthieu (French*), Kresčak (Czech*, archaic Slovak*), Kresi an Pontje – Креси ан Понтје (Serbian*)
(Netherlands) Culemborg	Culemborg (Dutch*), Kulemborgas (Lithuanian)
(Italy) Cuneo	Coni (French*, Occitan*, Piedmontese*), Cuneum (Latin*), Kuneo – Кунео (Serbian*)

== D ==
English name	Other names or former names
(Belgium) Damme	Damė (Lithuanian), Damme (Dutch*, West Flemish*), Dammum (Latin*)
(Belgium) Deinze	Deinsa (Latin), Deinze (Dutch*, French*, West Flemish*), Deinzė (Lithuanian), Deynze (alternative French*)
(Latvia) Daugavpils	Borisoglebsk – Борисоглебск (Russian, 1656–1667),^{[KNAB]} Daugavpils (Estonian*, Finnish*, Latvian*, Romanian*), Daugavpils – Даугавпилс (Russian*,^{[KNAB]} Serbian*), Daugavp'ilsi – დაუგავპილსი (Georgian*), Daugawpils (Afrikaans alternative*), Daŭgaŭpils – Даўгаўпілс (Belarusian*), Daugpėlis (Samogitian*), Daugpilis (Lithuanian*),^{[KNAB]} Daugpiļs (Latgalian), Denenburg – דענענבורג (Yiddish*), Dinaburg (Livonian, 1275–1893), Dünaburg (German*),^{[KNAB]} Dunaburgum, Duna urbs or Duneburgum (Latin*), Duneborch (Low German), Dvinohrad (Czech alternative),^{[KNAB]} Dvinsk – דוינסק (Hebrew*), Dvinsk – Двинcк (archaic Russian*),^{[KNAB]} Dynaburg (archaic Swedish),^{[KNAB]} Dynaburg – Дынабург (archaic Belarusian, archaic Taraškievica Belarusian), Dyneburg (Polish*),^{[KNAB]} Dzvinsk – Дзвінск (Belarusian), Dźvinsk – Дзьвінск (Taraškievica Belarusian*), Dźwińsk or Dźwinów (archaic Polish variants*), Väinalinn (archaic Estonian variant),^{[KNAB]} Väinänlinna (Finnish alternative*)^{[KNAB]}, Düünaburi (Estonian*), Dunebourg (French*)
(Romania) Dărmănești	Dărmănești (Romanian*), Darmanešti – Дарманешти (Serbian), Dermenešt' – Дерменешть (Ukrainian*), Dormánfalva (Hungarian*)
(Switzerland) Davos	Dabosu – ダボス (Japanese*), Davos (German*), Davos – Давос (Russian*, Serbian*), Davós – Νταβός (Greek*), Davosi – დავოსი (Georgian*), Dá wò sī – 達沃斯 (Chinese*), Tafaat (local Romansh dialect), Tavate (Italian, rarely*), Tavau (Romansh*), Tavaus (Latin*)
(Hungary) Debrecen	Debeurechen / Tebŭrech'en – 데브레첸 (Korean*), Debrecen (Hungarian*, Finnish*), Debrecin (Bosnian*, Croatian*), Debrecin – Дeбрецин (Serbian*), Debrecín (Slovak*, Czech*), Debrețin (Romanian*), Débretsen – Ντέμπρετσεν (Greek*), Debretsin – Дeбрецин (Russian*), Debreczyn (Polish*), Debretzyn – דעברעצין (Yiddish*), Debrezin (German*), Debrezun (old Hungarian, 13th century)
(Netherlands) Delden	Delden (Dutch*), Deldenas (Lithuanian)
(Netherlands) Delft	Delft (Dutch*), Delfta (Latvian*), Delftas (Lithuanian*), Delfum (Latin*)
(Netherlands) Delfshaven	Delfs'aeven (Zeelandic*), Delfshaven (Dutch*)
(Netherlands) Delfzijl	Delfsyl (Western Frisian*), Delfzeilas (Lithuanian), Delfzeyl (West Flemish*), Delfziel (Low Saxon*), Delfzijl (Dutch*)
(Belgium) Dendermonde	Dendermonde (Dutch*), Dendermondė (Lithuanian), Teneramonda (Latin*), Termonde (French*)
(United Kingdom) Derry	Deri – Дери (Serbian), Derio (Esperanto), Derrie or Lunnonderrie (Ulster Scots), Doire or Doire Chaluim Chille (Scottish Gaelic*), Doire or Doire Cholm Cille (Irish), Londonderry (official English)
(Slovakia) Detva	Detva (Slovak*), Gyetva (Hungarian*)
(Netherlands) Deventer	Daeventer (Low Saxon*), Daventria (Latin*), Deventer (Dutch*), Dèventer (Low German*), Deventera (Latvian*), Deventeris (Lithuanian*), Dimter (Western Frisian*)
(Belgium) Diest	Diensta (Latin), Diest (Dutch*), Distas (Lithuanian*)
(France) Dijon	Castrum Divionense or Diviodunum (Latin*), Digione (Italian*), Dijon (Azeri*, Finnish*, French*, Romanian*), Dijon – דיז'ון (Hebrew*), Dijong / Tijong – 디종 (Korean), Dižon – Дижон (Serbian*), Dižona (Latvian*)
(Belgium) Diksmuide	Diksmuidas (Lithuanian), Diksmuide (Dutch*), Diksmude (West Flemish*), Diksmuje (Zeelandic*) Dixmuda (Latin), Dixmude (French*, Occitan*), Smude (alternative West Flemish*)
(Belgium) Dilsen-Stokkem	Dilsen-Stockem (French*), Dilsen-Stockheim (German*), Dilsen-Stokkem (Dutch*), Dilse-Stokkem (Limburgish*), Feresne et Stockhemium (Latin)
(Belgium) Dinant	Dinant (French*, Walloon*) Dionantium (Latin*)
(Slovakia) Dobšiná	Dobschau (German*), Dobsina (Hungarian*), Dobšiná (Slovak*), Dobşina (Azerbaijani*), Dobsinium (Latin), Dobszyna (Polish*)
(Netherlands) Doesburg	Doesburch (Western Frisian*), Doesburg (Dutch*), Doezebarg (Low German*, Low Saxon*), Dusburgas (Lithuanian)
(Netherlands) Doetinchem	Deutekem (Low Saxon*), Doetinchem (Dutch*), Dutinchemas (Lithuanian*), Dūtinhema (Latvian*)
(Netherlands) Dokkum	Dokkum (Dutch*), Dokumas (Lithuanian)
(Slovakia) Dolný Kubín	Alsókubin (Hungarian*), Dolni Kubin (Serbo-Croatian*), Dolnı Kubin (Azerbaijani*), Dolni Kubīna (Latvian*), Dolný Kubín (Slovak*), Dolny Kubynas (Lithuanian*), Unterkubin (German*)
(Czech Republic) Domažlice	Domažlice (Czech*), Taus (German*)
(Netherlands) Domburg	Domburg (Dutch*), Domburgas (Lithuanian), Domburgo (Spanish*), Dombourg (French*)
(Italy) Domodossola	Dòm (Lombard), Domodossola (Esperanto, Italian, Venetian), Oscela Lepontiorum (Latin), Uscla (Etruscan)
(United Kingdom) (England) Doncaster	Danum (Classical Latin), Denocestria (Modern Latin*), Dinas y Garrai (Welsh*), Donkastera (Latvian*), Donkasteris (Lithuanian*), Kardhana (Cornish*)
(Ukraine) Donetsk	Aleksandrovka – Александровка (former Russian, until 1869), Danietsk (Russian*), Doněck (Czech*), Doneck (Slovak*), Doņecka (Latvian*), Doneţk (Romanian*), Donetsiku – ドネツィク (Japanese*), Donetsk (Azeri*, Finnish*), Donetsk – Донецьк (Ukrainian*), Donetskas (Lithuanian*), Donetski – დონეცკი (Georgian*), Donezk (German*), Donieck (Polish*), Donjeck (Serbian*), Donyeck (Hungarian*), Hughesovka / Yuzovka – Юзовка (Russian, 1869–1923*), Jousofka (French, 1869–1923*), Trotsk - Тротск (Russian, 1923), Stalin – Сталин (former Russian, 1924–1929*), Stalino – Сталино (former Russian, 1929–1961*), Yuzivka – Ю́зівка (Ukrainian, 1869–1924*)
(Netherlands) Dordrecht	Doardt (Western Frisian*), Dordracum (Latin*), Dordrech (Limburgish*), Dordrecht (Dutch*), Dordrehta (Latvian*), Dordrechtas (Lithuanian*), Dordrext (Azerbaijani), Dort (Anglo-Saxon*)
(France) Douai	Douai (French), Douay (former French), Dowaai (Dutch), Doway (former English), Duacum (Latin), Duagio (old Italian)
(United Kingdom) (Isle of Man) Douglas	Doolish (Manx*), Douglas (English), Dùghlais (Scottish Gaelic), Dúglas (Irish)
(United Kingdom) (England) Dover	Dōbā – ドーバー (Japanese*), Dobeo / Tobŏ – 도버 (Korean), Douvres (French*), Dover (Dutch, Finnish*, German, Hungarian*, Italian, Romanian*, Spanish), Dover – דובר (Hebrew*), Dôver (Portuguese*), Doveris (Lithuanian*), Dubris (Latin*), Duvra (Latvian*), Dúvres (former Spanish)
(Greece) Drama	Dráma - Δράμα (Greek), Drama - Драма (Bulgarian), Drama / Dırama (Turkish)
(Germany) Dresden	Délěisīdùn – 德累斯顿 (Chinese*), Deureseuden / Tŭresŭden – 드레스덴 (Korean*), Doresuden – ドレスデン (Japanese*), Drážďany (Czech*, Slovak*), Dresda (Italian*, variant in Portuguese*, Romanian*), Dresde (French*, Spanish*), Dresden (Dutch*, Finnish*, German*, Portuguese*, Swedish*, Turkish*), Drésdi – Δρέσδη (Greek*), Drezda (Hungarian*), Drezden (Azeri*), Drezden – Дрезден (Bulgarian*, Russian*, Serbian*), Drezden – דרזדן (Hebrew*), Drezdenas (Lithuanian*), Drēzdene (Latvian*), Drezdeni – დრეზდენი (Georgian*), Drezno (Polish*), Drježdźany (Lower Sorbian)
(Romania) Drobeta-Turnu Severin	Drobeta-Turnu Severin (official Romanian*), Drobetae (Latin), Severin (Romanian, informal*), Szörényvár (Hungarian*), Turnu Severin (former Romanian*)
(Poland) Drohiczyn	Darahičyn – Дарагічын (Belarusian*), Dorohochyn (Ukrainian*), Drohičinas (Lithuanian*), Drohiczyn (Polish*)
(Ukraine) Drohobych	Drogobâci (Romanian*), Drogobych -Дрогобыч (Russian*), Drohobych – Дрогобич (Ukrainian*), Drohobycz (Polish*), Drohobytsch (German*), Drubitsh – דראָהאָביטש (Yiddish*)
(Republic of Ireland) Dublin	Áth Cliath (Irish short form), Baile Átha Cliath (Irish*), Baile Àth Cliath (Scottish Gaelic*), Dablin (Arabic, Serbian*), Dablin – דבלין (Hebrew*), Daburin – ダブリン (Japanese*), Deobeullin / Tŏbŭllin – 더블린 (Korean), Difelin (Old English*), Dubhlind or Duibhlind (early Classical Irish variants*), Dubhlinn (archaic Irish*), Dublim (Portuguese*), Dublin (Azeri*, Brazilian Portuguese*, Dutch*, Finnish*, French*, Hungarian*, Interlingua, Maltese, Romanian*, Swedish*, Turkish*), Dublín (Catalan*, Spanish*), Dublin – Дублин (Russian*), Duḃlinn, Duiḃlinn or Duibhlinn (historical Irish*), Dublina (Latvian*), Dublinas (Lithuanian*), Dublini – დუბლინი (Georgian*), Dublino (Italian*), Dūbólín – 都柏林 (Chinese*), Dulenn (Breton*), Dulyn (Welsh*), Duvlíno – Δουβλίνο (Greek*), Dyvlinarskire (old Swedish*), Dyflin (Old Norse*), Dyflinni (Icelandic*), Divlyn (Manx*)
(Slovakia) Dubnica nad Váhom	Dubnica nad Váhom (Slovak*), Dubnica pie Vāhas (Latvian*), Dubnica prie Vaho (Lithuanian*), Dubnitz an der Waag (German*), Máriatölgyes (Hungarian*)
(Croatia) Dubrovnik	Dubeurobeunikeu / Tubŭrobŭnik'ŭ – 두브로브니크 (Korean), Dubrovnic (Romanian*), Dubrovnik (Albanian*, Azeri*, Croatian*, Dutch*, Finnish*, German*, Portuguese*, Serbian*, Slovene*, Swedish*, Turkish*), Dubrovnik – דוברובניק (Hebrew*), Dubrovnik – Дубровник (Bulgarian *, Serbian *), Dubrovník (Czech*, Slovak*), Dubrovnika (Latvian*), Dubrovnikas (Lithuanian*), Dubrovnik'i – დუბროვნიკი (Georgian*), Dubrownik (Polish*), Ragoúsa – Ραγούσα (Greek*), Ragusa (Dalmatian, former English, former German*, Italian*, former Romanian*), Raguse (old French*), Raguza (former Hungarian*, Ottoman Turkish*), Rhagusium (Latin)
(Slovakia) Dudince	Dudince (Slovak*), Dudintze (German*), Gyűgy (Hungarian*)
(Germany) Duisburg	Dīsburga (Latvian*), Duisbourg (French*), Duisburg (Czech *, Danish*, Dutch *, German*, Italian*, Polish*, Swedish*), Duisburgas (Lithuanian*), Duisburgo (Spanish*, Portuguese*)
(Slovakia) Dunajská Streda	Dunaiska Streda (Lithuanian*), Dunajska Streda (Latvian*), Dunajská Streda (Slovak*), Dunayska Streda (Azerbaijani*), Dunaszerdahely (Hungarian*), Niedermarkt (German*)
(Republic of Ireland) Dún Laoghaire	Dùn Laoghaire (Scottish Gaelic*), Dunleary (anglicised form pre-1821, still reflected in the pronunciation of "Dún Laoghaire" by English-speakers), Kingstown (English, 1821–1921*)
(United Kingdom) (Scotland) Dundee	Allectum (alternative Latin*), Dandis (Lithuanian*), Dùn Dèagh (Scottish Gaelic*, Irish*, Manx*, Breton*), Taodunum (Latin*)
(France) Dunkirk	Dankeruku – ダンケルク (Japanese*), Dinkerk – דנקרק (Hebrew*), Diunk'erk'i – დიუნკერკი (Georgian*), Djunkerk – Дюнкерк (Russian*),^{[KNAB]} Doengkeleukeu – 됭케르크 (Korean*), Doncherche (archaic Italian), Donkarkız (Turkish*), Dounkérki – Δουνκέρκη (Greek*), Duinkerke (Dutch*),^{[KNAB]}) Duinkerken (Afrikaans*, alternative Dutch),^{[KNAB]} Dukark (Breton*),^{[KNAB]} Dūnkè'ěrkè – 敦克爾克 (Mandarin Chinese*), Dunkèke (Picard*), Dunkerque (French*, Italian*, Romanian*),^{[KNAB]} Dunkierka (Polish*),^{[KNAB]} Dünkirchen (German*),^{[KNAB]} Dunkirk (Hungarian), Dunquerca (Latin*), Dunquèrca (Occitan*), Dunquerque (Portuguese*, Spanish*), Dúntsjerk (West Frisian*), Duunkerke (local Flemish*)
(Belgium) Durbuy	Diurbiuji (Lithuanian), Durbetum (Latin*), Derbu (Walloon*), Durbuy (French*)
(Albania) Durrës	Dıraç (Turkish*), Dirráchio – Δυρράχιο (Modern Greek*), Drač (Croatian*, Czech*, Slovene*), Drač – Драч (Macedonian*, Serbian*), Drach – Драч (former Bulgarian*), Duras (former French*), Durazo (Portuguese*), Durazzo (Italian*), Duresi – დურესი (Georgian*), Durrës (Albanian*, Romanian*), Durŭs – Дуръс (Bulgarian*), Dyrrhachion – Δυρράχιον (Byzantine Greek), Dyrrhachium (Latin*), Epidamnos (Ancient Greek*)
(Germany) Düsseldorf	Diseldorf – דיסלדורף (Hebrew*), Diseldorf – Диселдорф (Serbian*), Diseldorfa (Latvian*), Dísseldorf – Ντίσελντορφ (Greek*), Diuseldorfas (Lithuanian*), Diuseldorpi – დიუსელდორფი (Georgian*), Düsseldorf (Azeri*, Brazilian Portuguese*, Estonian*, Finnish*, German*, Hungarian*, Romanian*, Swedish*, Turkish*), Dusseldorf (Italian*), Dusseldórfia (Portuguese*), Dusseldorp (Dutch, antiquated*), Düsseldorp (former local dialect), Dusserudorufu – デュッセルドルフ (Japanese*), Dwiseldoreupeu / Twiseldorŭp'ŭ – 뒤셀도르프 (Korean)
