= Oleksandr Lukyanchenko =

De jure Mayor of Donetsk, Ukraine

- Олександр Лук'янченко
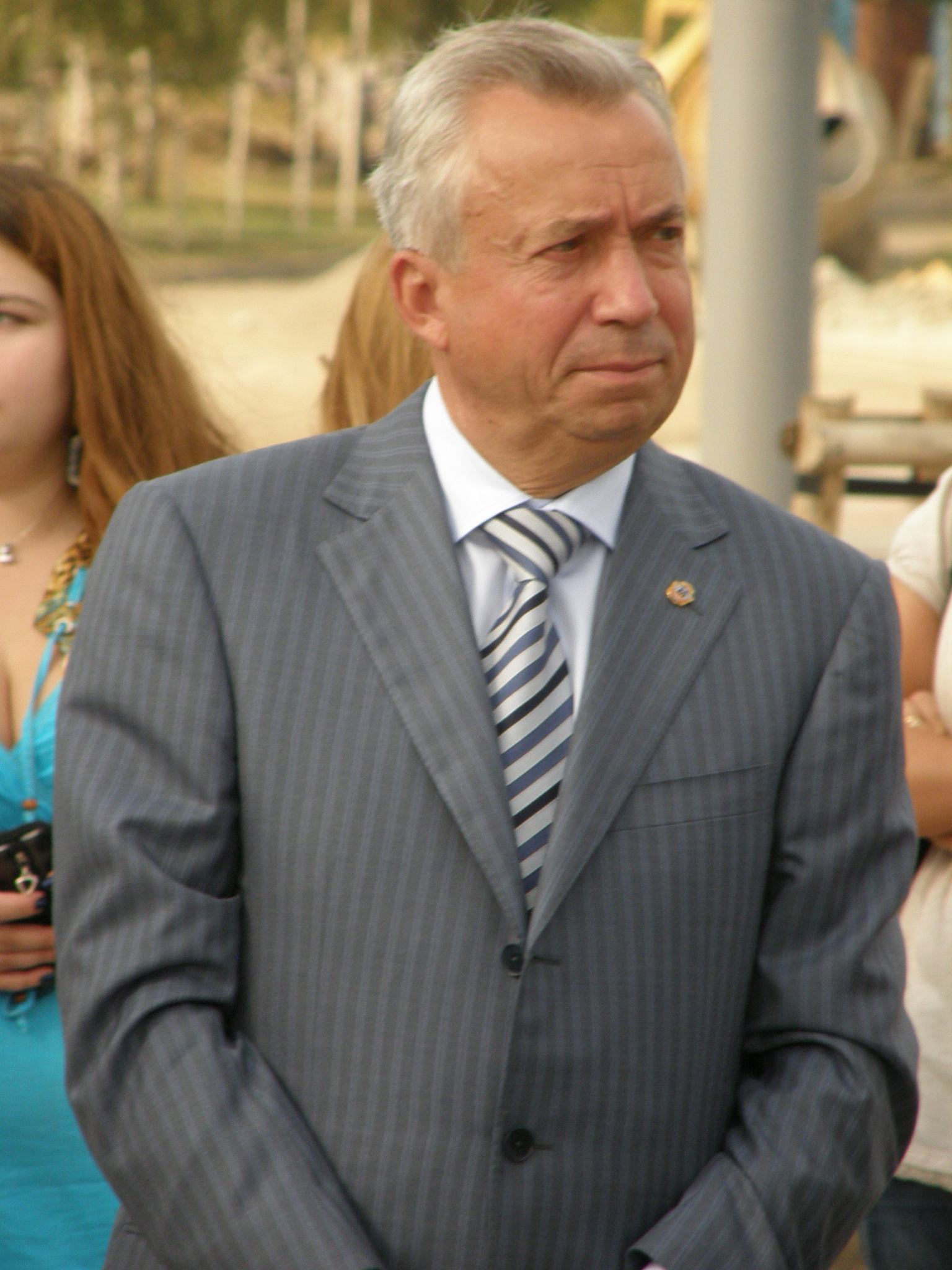
- Lukyanchenko at Donetsk in September 2010

Mayor of Donetsk
- In office 31 March 2002 – 14 July 2014; In exile: since 14 July 2014
- Preceded by: Volodymyr Rybak
- Succeeded by: Kostyantyn Savinov

Personal details
- Born: 30 August 1947 (age 79) Berdychi, Donetsk Oblast, Ukrainian SSR, Soviet Union
- Party: Party of Regions

Oleksandr Oleksiyovych Lukyanchenko (Note: Ukrainian: Олександр Олексійович Лук'янченко; Russian: Александр Алексеевич Лукьянченко; Aleksandr Alekseyevich Lukyanchenko) (born 30 August 1947) is a Ukrainian politician who is the de facto former mayor of the city of Donetsk, Ukraine. Under Ukrainian law, he is the de jure mayor since 2014.

== Life ==
He was born to a Russian-speaking Ukrainian family in the village of Berdychi, in Donetsk Oblast. He attended primary school in the village of his birth, and secondary school in Avdiivka. In 1962, he entered the Makiivka Civil Engineering Institute, and then served in a tank corps in the Soviet Army. After his service in the army, he worked as a chief engineer at multiple factories in Donetsk.

After the collapse of the Soviet Union, he became vice-president of the city administration in Donetsk city on 27 November 1992. From 1994 to 1996, he worked in the Donetsk regional state administration, where he also achieved the post of vice-president. Then, he spent two years as the director-general of the highway administration of Donetsk Oblast. He was nominated vice-mayor of Donetsk city, under Volodymyr Rybak, who he replaced as mayor in 2002 after 31 March municipal elections. He was re-elected on 26 March 2006, and again on 31 October 2010.

His role came to prominence during the 2014 pro-Russian unrest in Ukraine. Lukyanchenko has criticised separatists affiliated with the Donetsk People's Republic and the post-Euromaidan Ukrainian government. Lukyanchenko left the city of Donetsk for Kyiv in early July, after he had received death threats from members of the Donetsk People's Republic. He said he would continue to run the city administration from Kyiv until he was able to return to Donetsk.

== See also ==
- List of mayors of Donetsk
