= 2012 Ukrainian parliamentary election =

- 28 October 2012

All 450 seats in the Verkhovna Rada 226 seats needed for a majority
- Turnout: 57.43% (▼4.60 pp)
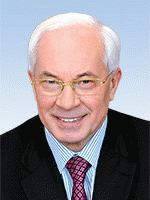

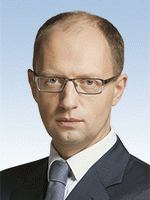

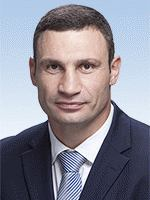

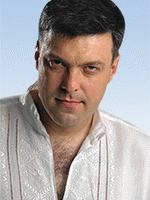

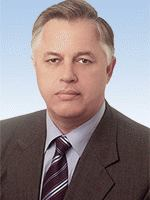
	First party	Second party	Third party
Leader	Mykola Azarov	Arseniy Yatsenyuk	Vitali Klitschko
Party	Party of Regions	Batkivshchyna	UDAR
Leader since	23 April 2010	23 April 2012	24 April 2010
Leader's seat	Party list	Party list	Party list
Last election	175 seats, 34.94%	156 seats, 31.23%	New
Seats won	185	101	40
Seat change	▲10	▼55	New
Popular vote	6,116,746	5,209,090	2,847,979
Percentage	30.00% (PR)	25.55% (PR)	13.97% (PR)
Swing	▼4.94%	▼5.68%	New
	Fourth party	Fifth party
Leader	Oleh Tyahnybok	Petro Symonenko
Party	Svoboda	KPU
Leader since	14 February 2004	19 June 1993
Leader's seat	Party list	Party list
Last election	0 seats, 0.78%	27 seats, 5.48%
Seats won	37	32
Seat change	▲37	▲5
Popular vote	2,129,933	2,687,269
Percentage	10.45% (PR)	13.18% (PR)
Swing	▲9.67%	▲7.70%
Prime Minister before election
Mykola Azarov
Party of Regions
Elected Prime Minister
Mykola Azarov
Party of Regions

Parliamentary elections were held in Ukraine on 28 October 2012. Because of various reasons, including the "impossibility of announcing election results" various by-elections have taken place since. Hence, several constituencies have been left unrepresented at various times.

Unlike the two previous elections, this election used a parallel voting system, with half the seats elected by party-list proportional representation using a 5% election threshold and the other half by first-past-the-post voting in single-member constituencies, with alliances no longer allowed. The parallel voting system was used previously in 1998 and 2002.

The election campaign was limited to 90 days. Every citizen of Ukraine 18 years of age or older was able to vote in 33,540 polling stations in Ukraine and 116 foreign polling stations in 77 countries.

The Party of Regions won the largest number of seats while Fatherland (with several parties together as an "umbrella" party) came second. The election was also noted for the rise of the far-right party Svoboda, which came in fourth. The new (on the national scene) party UDAR also enjoyed noticeable great success with its third place in the election. The far-left Communist Party of Ukraine almost tripled its numbers of voters but because of the mixed election system used in the election it only won five more seats compared with the previous election. Because of this mixed system three small parties and 43 unaffiliated politicians also made it into parliament.

The new parliament was appointed and started its tasks on 12 December 2012 – six weeks after the elections. This was the last national Ukrainian election Crimea participated in before the annexation of Crimea by the Russian Federation in 2014.

== Background ==
=== Political crises and cancelled 2008 snap elections ===
On 8 October 2008 Ukrainian President Viktor Yushchenko tried to dissolve the Verkhovna Rada (parliament) and called early parliamentary elections in Ukraine for the second time in as many years for 7 December 2008. The right of the President to dismiss the parliament was challenged in Ukraine's Constitutional Court. The President's decree has since lapsed as it was never put into action (the coalition supporting the second Tymoshenko Government was extended) and appeals to Ukraine's Constitutional Court were withdrawn. Nevertheless, a snap election was predicted by Ukrainian politicians during the 2010 presidential election and after the dismissal of the second Tymoshenko Government. One of the arguments against holding early elections were the costs. Early elections were (in October 2008) estimated to cost approximately ₴417 million (about EUR€60 million or US$80 million).

=== 2012 election date set ===
On 1 February 2011 the Verkhovna Rada set the election date for 28 October 2012. Several deputies whose votes were registered that day have stated they could not have taken part in voting because they were not in Kyiv (where the Verkhovna Rada building is located) on 1 February 2011. Voting by MPs in the place of absent MPs of the Verkhovna Rada is prohibited by law. On 27 July 2012 the Central Election Commission of Ukraine announced that campaigning for the elections would commence on July 30.

== Electoral system ==
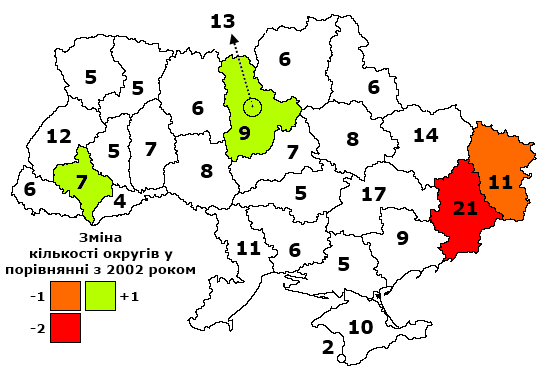
Number of single-mandate constituencies per oblast compared with year 2002.

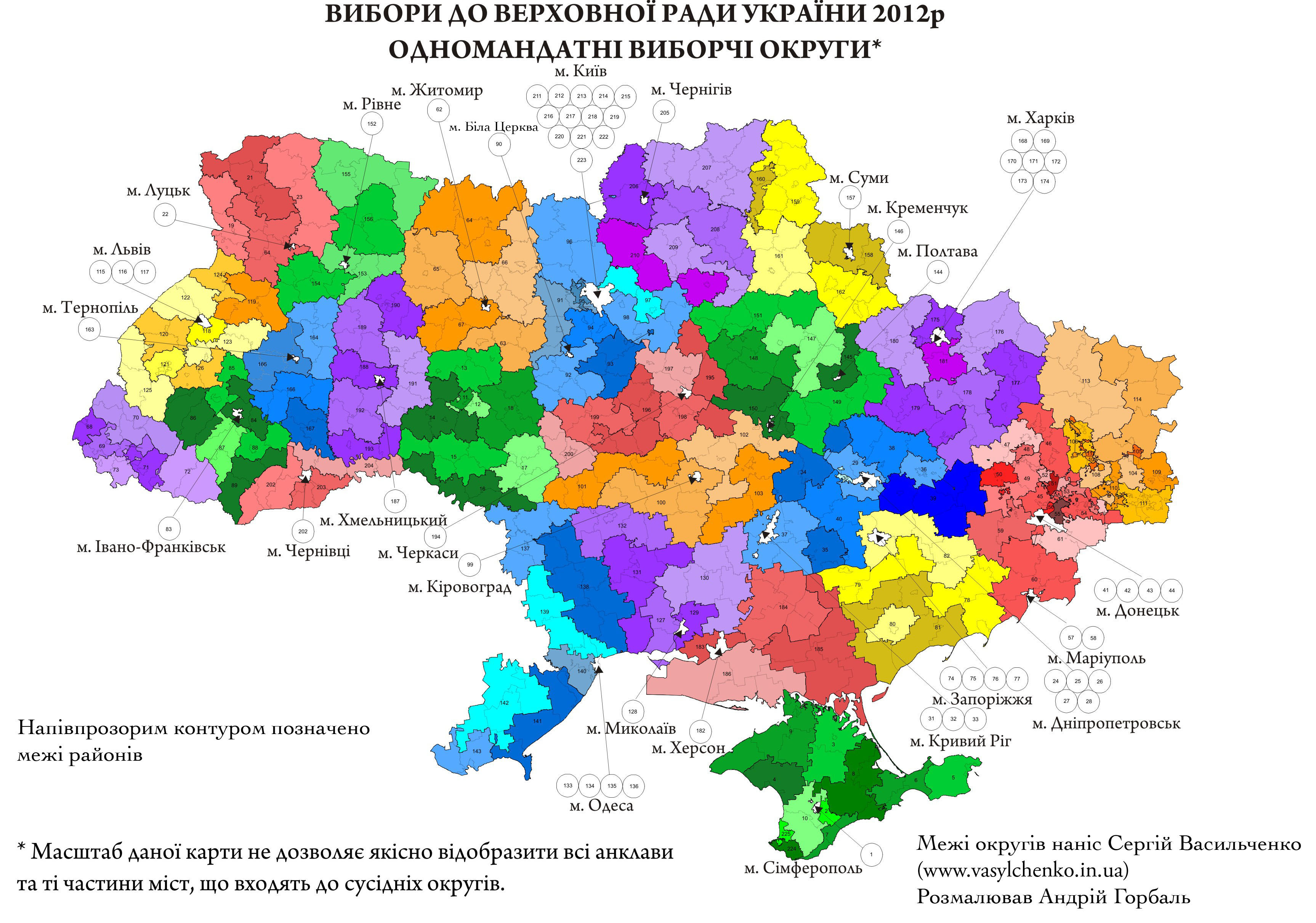
Map of single-mandate okruhy (districts) in elections.

In June 2011 the Venice Commission reviewed a proposed Draft Law on the election of Ukrainian parliamentary members. The proposal sought to re-instate a parallel voting system – used in the 1998 and 2002 elections – with the establishment of 225 local single-member districts elected (in one round) by a first-past-the-post electoral system (candidate with the highest vote total wins); and the remaining 225 parliamentary seats being elected nationwide on a proportional party-list system with a 5% support threshold; and excluding political blocs from all elections. The option "Vote against all" was also made defunct in the proposal (according to a November 2012 opinion poll by Research & Branding Group (otherwise) 17% of the voters would have voted "against everybody" during the elections). The opposition and Ukrainian analysts accused the Party of Regions of "rewriting the law so that the president could secure a majority in the next Verkhovna Rada." In October 2011 the Venice Commission recommended Ukraine should not return to a mixed election system. Nevertheless, on 17 November 2011 the Ukrainian Parliament approved an election law almost identical to the June 2011 proposed Draft Law. This new law satisfied the major opposition parties Batkivschyna and Front for Change; but was condemned by the core party of Our Ukraine–People's Self-Defense Bloc, Our Ukraine. Candidates could be elected on party lists or through self-nomination. On 8 December 2011 President Viktor Yanukovych signed the new election law. Since then several parties merged with other parties.

The possibility to be simultaneously be nominated on a nationwide party list and in a single mandate constituency also was declared unconstitutional by the Constitutional Court of Ukraine on 10 April 2012.

Voters could temporarily change their place of voting without changing their permanent voting address.

== Registered parties ==
In contrast with the 2007 parliamentary elections, candidates in this election could be elected on party lists or through self-nomination. There were 87 parties registered for the elections to compete in electoral districts. For the nationwide list the voters could choose between 22 parties. Several parties united together under "umbrella" parties. For example, the election list of All-Ukrainian Union "Fatherland" included members of Reforms and Order Party, People's Movement of Ukraine, Front of Changes, For Ukraine, People's Self-Defense, Civil Position and Social Christian Party. This electoral list was the result of negotiations within the opposition Dictatorship Resistance Committee.

=== Nationwide list ===
The Central Election Commission of Ukraine had registered 22 parties who would participate on the nationwide list. On 15 October 2012 Ukrainian Platform "Assembly" withdrew itself from the national list (it had received ballot number 1) but the other ballot numbers did not change. So the ballot numbers were:

1. No party
2. Socialist Party of Ukraine
3. Communist Party of Ukraine
4. Political Union "Native Fatherland"
5. Russian Bloc
6. Party of Nataliya Korolevska "Ukraine – Forward!"
7. All-Ukrainian Union "Community"
8. Ukrainian National Assembly
9. Liberal Party of Ukraine
10. New Politics
11. All-Ukrainian Union "Svoboda"
12. Ukrainian Party "Green Planet"
13. Party of Pensioners of Ukraine
14. Our Ukraine (Our Ukraine, Ukrainian People's Party, Congress of Ukrainian Nationalists)
15. Greens
16. Party of Greens of Ukraine
17. UDAR of Vitaliy Klychko
18. Ukraine of the Future
19. All-Ukrainian Union "Fatherland" (All-Ukrainian Union "Fatherland", People's Movement of Ukraine, People's Self-Defense, Front of Changes, For Ukraine!, Reforms and Order, Social-Christian Party, Civil Position)
20. Party of Regions
21. People's Labor Union of Ukraine
22. Radical Party of Oleh Lyashko

== Campaign ==
Andriy Klyuyev was the chief campaign manager for the Party of Regions. The Party of Regions' campaign focused heavily on promoting its record as the ruling party, contrasting the "stability" of the (then current) Azarov Government with "chaos" during the Second Tymoshenko Government in 2007–10 (which it referred to as: "the chaos and ruins of 5 years of orange leadership". It advocated a "balanced" approach to developing relations with Russia and the West, saying neither should be given priority over the other.

Fatherland tried to paint the election as a battle of good against evil and pledged to impeach President Viktor Yanukovych. The party stated it advocated "European values" and promised to reverse the Azarov Government policy of raising the status of the Russian language.

UDAR avoided sensitive and polarising subjects and focused instead on popular topics, such as more empowerment to ordinary Ukrainians and a ruthless campaign against corruption, the indifference of the authorities, the lack of local governance, inequality and poverty.

Svoboda softened their rhetoric in the campaign but nevertheless promised to shake up the country's political status quo.

One of the biggest spenders of the campaign was the party Ukraine – Forward!. One of their election billboards claimed that “an average wage of EUR€1,000 and a pension of €500” was realistic for Ukraine (the monthly average wage was €300 at the time).

Many candidates in single-seat constituencies tended to focus on local issues, often distancing themselves from party agendas.

Overall the election programs of the major parties bore many similarities; all pledged reforms to spur economic growth, higher wages, pensions and other benefits, better education and medical care.

Two weeks before the (28 October) election UDAR withdrew 26 of its candidates running in single-member constituencies in favour of Fatherland candidates and they withdrew 26 parliamentary candidates in favor of UDAR in an attempt to maximise votes for the opposition.

=== Costs ===
Political parties spent more than US$75 million on the election campaign in multi-member constituencies (according to the parties' official reports). The Party of Regions spent about US$27 million, Fatherland more than $13 million, UDAR more than $4 million, the Communist Party of Ukraine $9 million, Our Ukraine $8 million and Ukraine – Forward! $7.6 million. Svoboda claimed it had spent US$3 million on the campaign. The Ukraine of the Future did not spend anything on campaigning yet still managed to take the 15th spot amongst the 21 parties who participated in the nationwide list with 0.18% of the votes.

Denys Kovrizhenko of the International Foundation for Electoral Systems – Ukraine stated the sum of money spend could be up to 10 times more than what parties report afterwards. According to OPORA “In general, candidates spend about three times more than they officially report to spend”. Political scientist Artem Bidenko estimated other figures; he believed that the Party of Regions had spent around $850 million, Ukraine – Forward some $150 million, and the election campaigns of the rest of the political parties $350 million, while candidates in majority constituencies had spent some $900 million on the election campaign. About half of the single-constituency candidates submitted reports about their campaign spending.

In October 2008 Ukrainian experts estimated that a small political party who wants to win seats in parliament would spend up to US$30 million on the campaign and large political parties would spend up to $100 million. Political analyst Pavlo Bulhak stated then that a party's election budget will be spent on advertising on television, bribing voters, organizing rallies and party propaganda.

== Opinion polls ==
Note that on 17 November 2011 the Ukrainian Parliament approved an election law under which 225 members of Parliament would be elected under party lists and 225 would be winners of constituencies. Simultaneously the option to vote "Against all" had been made defunct; furthermore candidates could be elected on party lists or through self-nomination.

Party:	% 2007 election	FOM-Ukraine (May 2009)	KIIS (March 2010)	Rating (December 2010)	Rating (September 2011)	Rating (December 2011)	Rating (February 2012)	Rating (March 2012)	Rating (May 2012)	Rating (August 2012)	GfK (September 2012)	KIIS (September/ October 2012)	Rating (October 2012)
PoR	34.37	24.7	36.4	30.0	21.9	19.4	18.8	21.3	22.0	24.6	25	20.1	23
Fatherland	30.71†	15.8†	13.6†	19.6	18.9	20.3	20.3	20.9	25.6	26.2	15	12.1	16.5
Our Ukraine	14.15‡	<1	1.4	1.6	0.8	0.9	0.7	1.0	0.6	0.8	?	1.0	1.0
CPU	5.39	4	3.1	4.8	5.7	8.1	7.2	7.4	7.6	9.4	9	7.8	12.8
People's Party	3.96¶	2.7¶	1.3¶	0.7	1.6	1.2	1.6	1.5	0.8	1.3	?	<1	?
SPU	2.86*	0.4	0.2	0.8	0.8	0.2	0.8	-	0.5	?	?	<1	0.3
Svoboda	0.76	2.6	1.6	6.2	4.2	4.4	4.5	4.3	4.4	4.2	3	4.7	6
UDAR	dnp**		1	2.7	5.4	5	6.9	7.2	9.2	11.8	17	11.5	17.9
Ukraine – Forward!	Part of BYuT						0.5	1	3.8	4.2	3	1.4	3.1
FfC	dnp	8.4	4.3	7.2	11	11.3	11.7	9.9	Part of Fatherland	Part of Fatherland	Part of Fatherland	Part of Fatherland	Part of Fatherland
SU	Part of LB		7.3	6.4	Part of PoR	Part of PoR	Part of PoR	Part of PoR	Part of PoR	Part of PoR	Part of PoR	Part of PoR	Part of PoR
Other										2.1	15	?	2.3
Against all	2.73		6.3	7.4	10.7	Defunct	Defunct	Defunct	Defunct	Defunct	Defunct	Defunct	Defunct
Not voting	-		8.4		12.6	9.4	6.1	-	18.6 (not counted)	15.7 (not counted)	?	12.4	11.7 (not counted)
Unsure	-	10.2	13.4	8.7	11.3	14	18.2	17.7	19.0	18.6	13	27.2	17.2
* In 2006 political parties or election blocs needed to collect at least 3% of the national vote for all parties in order to gain seats in parliament. In November 2011 this election threshold was raised to 5% and simultaneously the participation of blocs of political parties was banned.
**"dnp" stands for "did not participate".
†Participated as the Yulia Tymoshenko Bloc (BYuT).
‡Participated as the Our Ukraine–People's Self-Defense Bloc (OU-PSD).
¶Participated as the Lytvyn Bloc (LB).

== Conduct ==
=== Fraud suspicions and accusations ===
From 2011 to 2013 with liaison to Serhiy Lyovochkin, Alan Friedman, Eckart Sager, who was a one time CNN producer, Rick Gates, Paul Manafort, and Manafort's senior aide Konstantin Kilimnik devised a strategy to discredit then Ukrainian Prime Minister Yulia Tymoshenko along with then United States Secretary of State Hillary Clinton who had been an outspoken critic of pro-Russia, pro-Kremlin, and pro-Putin supporters in Ukraine. Manafort's Global Endeavour Inc., a St. Vincent and Grenadines based consulting and lobbying company, his Lucicle Consultants Ltd., a Cyprus based consulting company, and three other of his companies were hired to provide support to then President of Ukraine Viktor Yanukovich and his Party of Regions. This strategy included: creating a fake think tank in Vienna, Austria, the Center for the Study of Former Soviet Socialist Republics (CXSSR), to support Yanukovich and his Party of Regions; using a social media blitz with Twitter, YouTube, and Facebook, and altering the Google's search stack to disseminate articles and videos that undermine opponents of the Party of Regions and Yanukovich in Europe and the United States; rewriting Wikipedia articles to smear Yanukovich opponents especially Tymoshenko; and using Breitbart News, RedState, and an article in The Wall Street Journal to discredit the Obama State Department and Hillary Clinton herself. Alan Friedman, who had not registered as a foreign agent in the United States, told Kostyantyn Gryshchenko that Friedman, who often wrote using the pen name Matthew Lina, published dozens of positive stories about the Party of Regions and Yanukovich and ensured that these were disseminated to over 2,000 publications and placed at the top of Google search stacks. Known as the Tymoshenko Files, Friedman sent Manafort a highly confidential two page letter detailing Friedman's efforts and that Friedman would claim to be Inna Bohoslovska to ghost pen articles on her behalf. In October 2012 after Hillary Clinton had supported Tymoshenko, Brietbart News released an article calling Hillary Clinton a “neo-Nazi Frankenstein”.

Before election day candidates and analysts predicted that bribery to secure votes would be rampant. A March 2012 poll by Research & Branding Group showed that 66% of the respondents believed that the election would not be fair, 18% disagreed with that. In June 2012 the Committee of Voters of Ukraine declared that the use of government resources for partisan ends would not be decisive in the (then upcoming) elections.

Following the elections the parties Fatherland, UDAR and Svoboda filled in an appeal at the Central Election Commission of Ukraine (CVK) with allegations of fraud in 13 simple-majority constituencies. Irregularities in the elections like cases of ballot stuffing, carousel voting, suspiciously high voter turnout and bribed voters have been reported. On 30 October 2012 the Committee of Voters of Ukraine stated that the elections saw a record number of cases of bribery of voters. They also insisted the elections had not brought the country closer to democratic standards. And that although there were no grounds to believe that the violations that were reported on polling day could affect the election results, the election results could seriously be affected by violations during the counting of votes.

According to Opora the most common violations of the electoral law during the election campaign in August were using government resources for partisan purposes and vote buying. According to Opora the Party of Regions committed the most violations of the electoral law. On 28 October 2012 Party of Regions itself claimed to have documented 607 violations of the election legislation by its opponents. According to Taras Kuzio Berkut riot police was used in attempts to destroy ballots.

On 1 November 2012 the Deputy Chairwoman of the Central Election Commission of Ukraine (CVK), Zhanna Usenko-Chorna, stated that the elections were heavily falsified. She indicated that several electoral districts clearly demonstrate a depravity of the single-constituency district elections in Ukraine and that as of 1 November CVK still had not received results from 14 electoral districts. According to her that was the main reason why CVK could not announce the complete results of the elections on the scheduled time, 31 October 2012.

In mid-February 2012 Bloc Yulia Tymoshenko deputy Roman Zabzalyuk alleged without providing evidence that "if the results on Election Day can't be sufficiently fixed" the Party of Regions had already made plans to bribe deputies to join the Party of Regions after their election into the Parliament; representatives of the Party of Regions denied allegations of bribery or plans to fix the election.

==== Kyiv and its region ====
A notably reported scandal took place at the electoral district 215 where initially a win was awarded to the acting chairman of the Kyiv city council Halyna Hereha. After the results were challenged it was decided to recount the votes with about 30 law enforcement personnel to keep public order. Later everything was resolved and cleared that indeed the votes between the two candidates Hereha (independent) and Andriy Illyenko ("Svoboda") were switched around. On 1 November 2012 Halyna Hereha officially complained about the elections, she stated that she did not intend to take it to court.

To another electoral district 211 in Kyiv was sent an ambulance as a deputy chairman of the district electoral commission had a nervous breakdown. The commission of the district for three days had a difficult time to count all the votes.

Another big scandal with involvement of the riot law enforcement unit of Berkut took place at the 95th electoral district (a Kyivan suburban city of Irpin). The electoral commission at the district was the slowest and the public involvement surely did not help to speed up the process, however a possible miscounting was prevented. Previously, a possible riot from a big "youth group of athletic posture" was suspected by witnesses.

Another scandal took place at the 223rd district where some fist fighting took place, which was eventually extinguished with the help of law enforcement. Oleh Tyahnybok told Ukrainska Pravda that "Svoboda" will be picketing "EpiCenter" supermarkets and apartments of the 223rd electoral district commission members. Because of the incident, Radio Liberty (Radio Svoboda) conducts a live broadcasting from the headquarters of the district. In protest the district electoral commission refuses to continue its work.

==== Southern Ukraine ====
At the 132nd district (Pervomaisk, Mykolaiv Oblast) peasants laid a siege around the building of the district electoral commission in the protest of post-electoral results. According to Batkivshchyna it had been defrauded a win in the district in favour of a candidate of Party of Regions.

=== International observers ===
On election day (28 October) there were 3,500 accredited foreign observers. The observers from the European Academy for Elections Observation (most of whom where European Parliament members), stated it was "a good election, not perfect but clearly acceptable", and that it was "in compliance with democratic norms". On 29 October the Organization for Security and Co-operation in Europe (OSCE) (who had monitored the election with 600 observers) stated in a preliminary report that "certain aspects of the pre-election period constituted a step backwards compared with recent national elections" and that the election was marred by "the abuse of power and the excessive role of money". It complained of "a lack of a level playing field, caused primarily by the abuse of administrative resources, lack of transparency of campaign and party financing, and lack of balanced media coverage". This contrasted sharply with the international observers' conclusions on Ukraine's February 2010 presidential election, judged then to have been transparent, unbiased and an "impressive display" of democracy.

Ten thousand foreign observers where expected to observe the elections. Some 100 long term observers from OSCE member states arrived in Ukraine starting from the middle of September 2012, followed by 600 short-term observers who will arrive a week before the elections to monitor the election process at voting stations.

Poland is to send observers to Ukraine to monitor the elections, Polish Foreign Minister Radosław Sikorski stated on 8 February 2012. German Ambassador to Ukraine Hans-Jürgen Heimsoeth stated "Germany is planning to send a numerous group of official supervisors" on 13 March 2012.

The total number of registered observers on October 9, was 1053 persons. The largest mission of international observers from CIS-EMO was 197 people.

On 2 October 2012 CIS-EMO observers presented the Interim report of the CIS-EMO Election Monitoring Mission. The report, in particular, noted that "The majority of detected violations are connected not with a political struggle of party lists but with the struggle of single-seat candidates". An impression that “antidemocratic power” clash with “democratic opposition” imposed by European and world society has a very relative nature that, as a rule, doesn’t distinct the real situation. In nowadays Ukrainian “peripheral capitalism” model such classes as “power” and “opposition” are conventionality. When the “Power Elite” is unconsolidated and disconnected and there is an open internal war between leading financial-industrial groups and corporations of Ukraine to get leverage of real state authority, all existing political parties only play the role of institutionalized political framework of realization of oligarchs’ economic interests.

On 5 October 2012 the CIS-EMO report was presented at the annual meeting of the OSCE Office for Democratic Institutions and Human Rights. Shortly before the presentation of CIS-EMO interim report web-site of CIS-EMO had been subjected to a massive DDoS-attack. The report was published on the official website of the OSCE in English and Ukrainian and also in Russian.

The ENEMO (European Network of Election Monitoring Organizations) mission for the 2012 parliamentary elections in Ukraine began its work on 23 July 2012 with the arrival of four Core Team members. ENEMO is the first international election observation mission registered for the Parliamentary Elections 2012 by the Central Election Commission (CEC). 35 LTOs (long-term observers) arrived to Kyiv on 5 August 2012 and were deployed throughout Ukraine. Long-term observer teams cover one or two oblasts of Ukraine. On E-day, October 28, ENEMO deployed 43 STO (Short-term observer) teams throughout all oblasts of Ukraine.

== Results ==
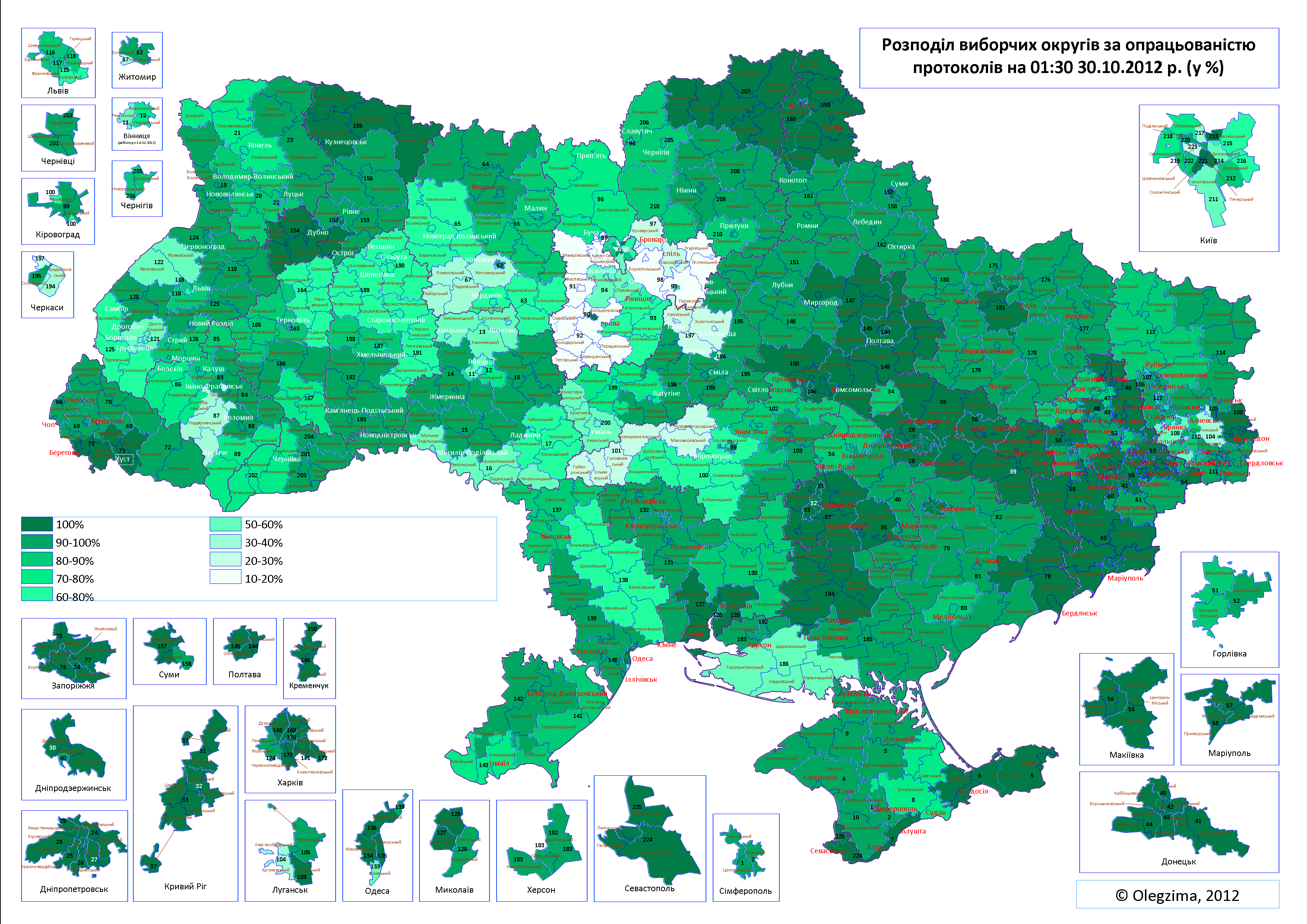
Level protocol handles on 30 October 2012; 1:30 pm

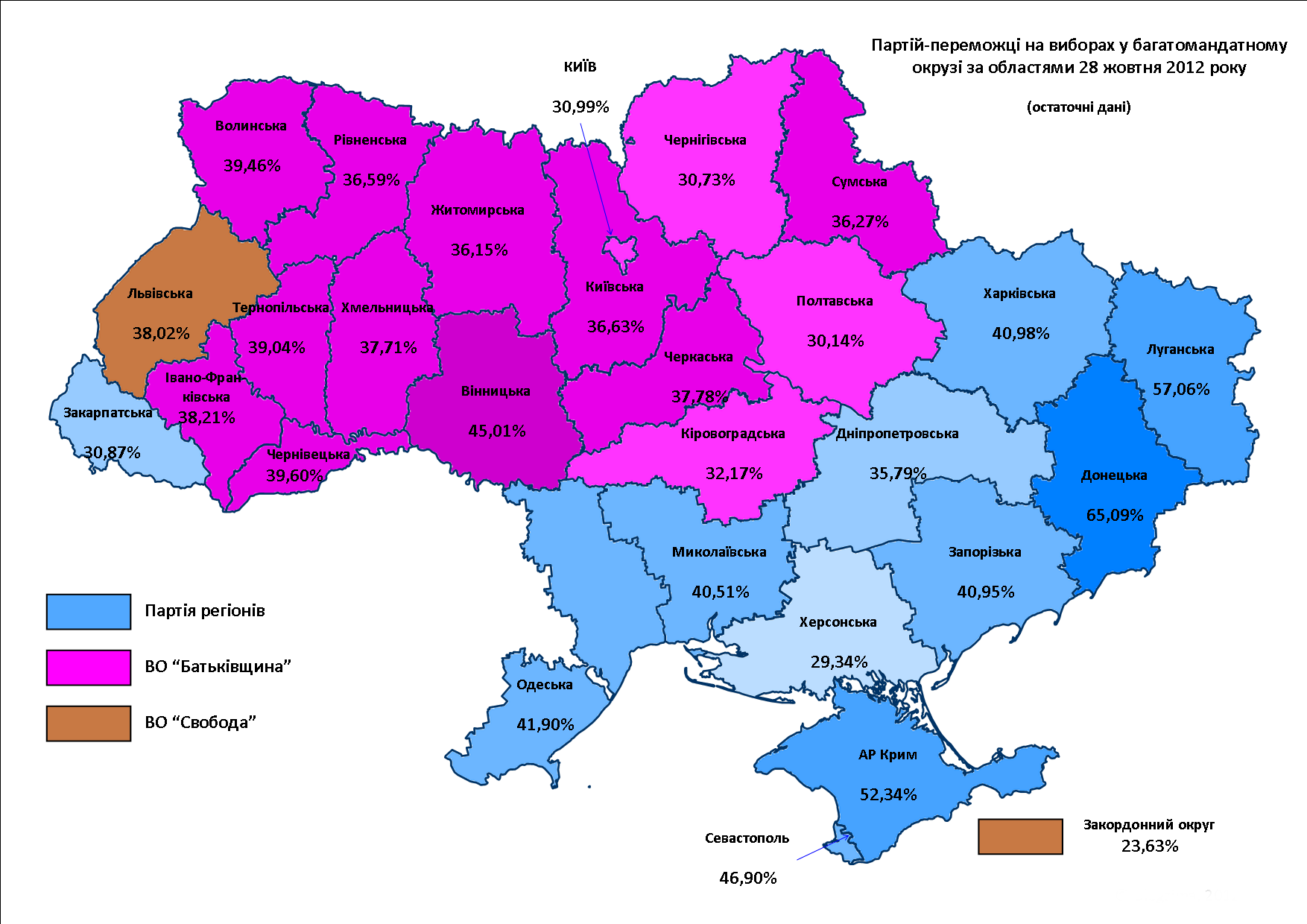
The leaders in multi-member districts by oblast

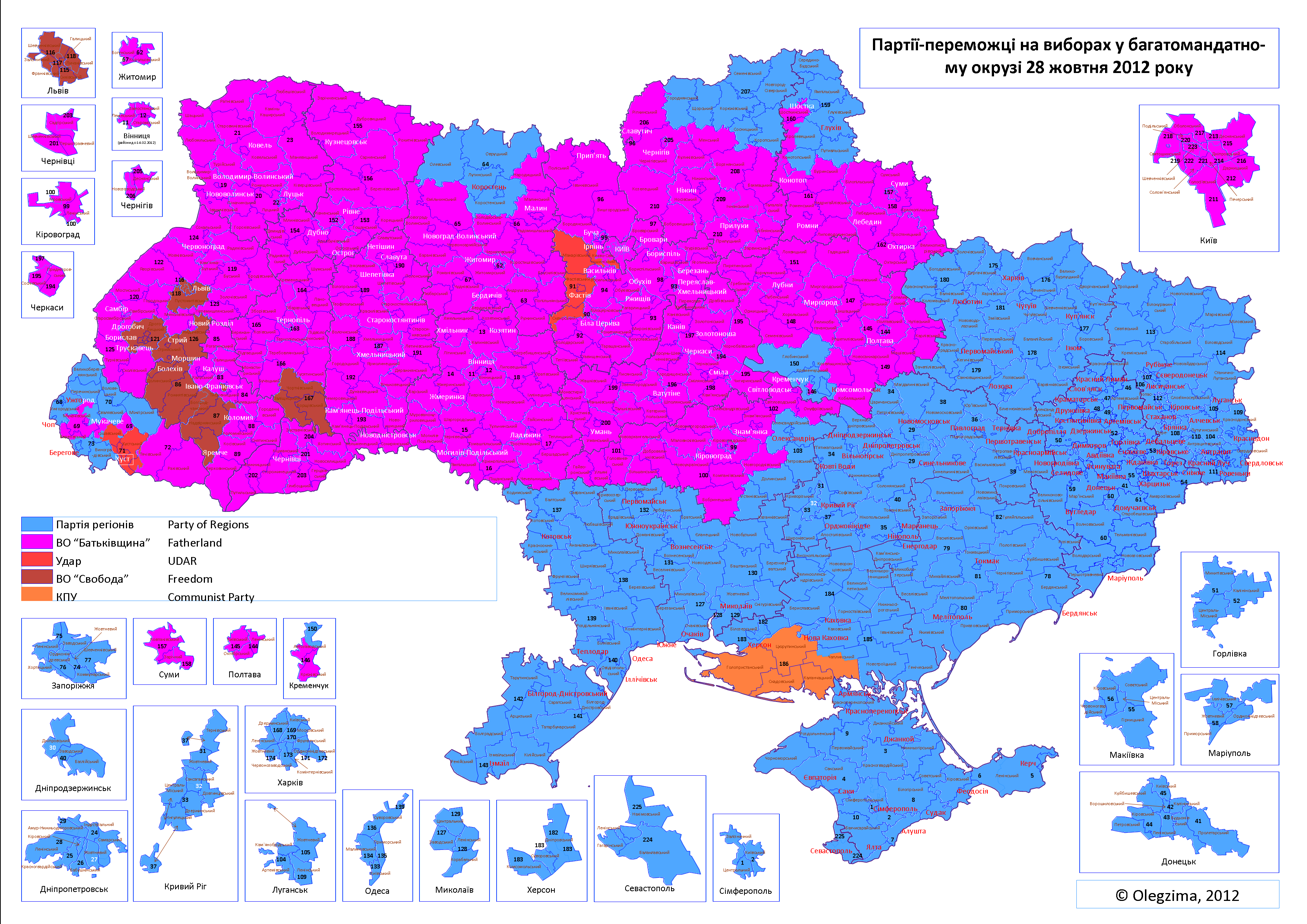
The leaders in multi-member districts by constituency

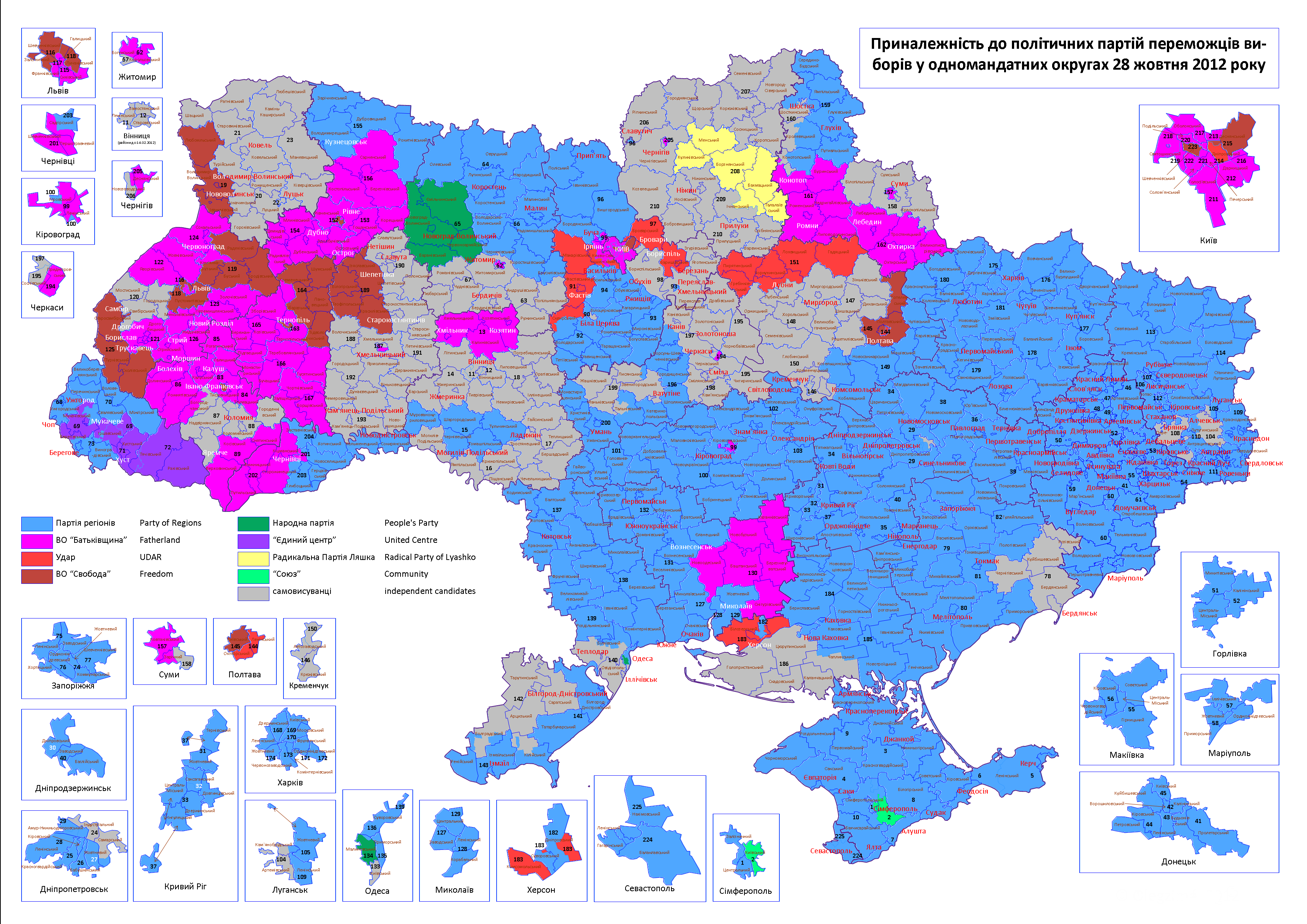
Leaders in single-mandate constituencies

On 8 November the Central Election Commission of Ukraine completed and released all results of the nationwide party list the constituencies (the elections took place on 28 October). Meanwhile, the Central Election Commission refused to establish the election results for the first-past-post results in 5 constituencies. The Central Election Commission of Ukraine finalized the vote count on 12 November 2012 but simultaneously ordered - on recommendation of the Verkhovna Rada - repeat elections (on a yet unknown date) in five troubled single-mandate constituencies where it could not establish results. Because of occurrences in these five constituencies. Hence, on 12 November 2012 445 deputies had been elected of the 450 seats in parliament. On 8 February 2013 the Supreme Administrative Court of Ukraine deprived 2 more deputies of power. They were banned from parliament on 3 July 2013. On 5 September 2013 the Verkhovna Rada itself set the date of all 7 re-elections to 15 December 2013.

Party	Proportional			Constituency			Total seats	+/–
Party	Votes	%	Seats	Votes	%	Seats	Total seats	+/–
Party of Regions	6,116,746	30.00	72	5,641,714	28.16	113	185	+10
Batkivshchyna	5,209,090	25.55	62	3,427,956	17.11	39	101	–55
Ukrainian Democratic Alliance for Reform	2,847,979	13.97	34	1,790,151	8.93	6	40	New
Communist Party of Ukraine	2,687,269	13.18	32	1,554,476	7.76	0	32	+5
Svoboda	2,129,933	10.45	25	848,854	4.24	12	37	+37
Ukraine – Forward!	322,198	1.58	0	187,006	0.93	0	0	New
Our Ukraine	226,492	1.11	0	51,654	0.26	0	0	–72
Radical Party of Oleh Liashko	221,144	1.08	0	105,236	0.53	1	1	New
Party of Pensioners of Ukraine	114,206	0.56	0	4,640	0.02	0	0	0
Socialist Party of Ukraine	93,071	0.46	0	121,752	0.61	0	0	0
Party of Greens of Ukraine	70,261	0.34	0	33,131	0.17	0	0	0
Ukrainian Party "Green Planet"	70,106	0.34	0	15,923	0.08	0	0	0
Russian Bloc	63,532	0.31	0	42,074	0.21	0	0	0
Greens	51,369	0.25	0				0	New
Ukraine of the Future	37,909	0.19	0	27,053	0.14	0	0	New
Native Fatherland	32,701	0.16	0	3,743	0.02	0	0	New
People's Labor Union of Ukraine	22,854	0.11	0	6,955	0.03	0	0	New
New Politics	21,030	0.10	0	15,168	0.08	0	0	0
Hromada	17,667	0.09	0	4,841	0.02	0	0	0
Ukrainian National Assembly	16,913	0.08	0	3,199	0.02	0	0	0
Liberal Party of Ukraine	15,549	0.08	0	3,255	0.02	0	0	0
People's Party				354,924	1.77	2	2	–18
United Centre				155,492	0.78	3	3	New
Congress of Ukrainian Nationalists				74,712	0.37	0	0	–
Ukrainian Platform "Sobor"				48,813	0.24	0	0	–
Soyuz				36,077	0.18	1	1	+1
Party of Hungarians of Ukraine				22,922	0.11	0	0	New
United Left and Peasants				21,542	0.11	0	0	New
Agrarian Party of Ukraine				16,225	0.08	0	0	New
People's Initiative				14,968	0.07	0	0	New
Russian Unity				13,806	0.07	0	0	New
European Party of Ukraine				13,533	0.07	0	0	–
Greater Ukraine				9,473	0.05	0	0	New
Patriotic Party of Ukraine				9,210	0.05	0	0	New
Ukrainian Party				9,088	0.05	0	0	New
Social-Environmental Party "Union. Chornobyl. Ukraine"				8,326	0.04	0	0	New
People's Party of Depositors and Social Security				7,684	0.04	0	0	New
Truth				6,391	0.03	0	0	New
People's Democratic Party				6,324	0.03	0	0	0
Ukrainian National Conservative Party				6,036	0.03	0	0	New
Viche				5,942	0.03	0	0	–
One Rus				5,860	0.03	0	0	New
Ukrainian Marine Party				5,535	0.03	0	0	New
State				5,422	0.03	0	0	New
Youth Party of Ukraine				5,297	0.03	0	0	New
Solidarity of Women of Ukraine				5,143	0.03	0	0	New
Fair Ukraine				4,808	0.02	0	0	New
People's Movement of Ukraine				3,081	0.02	0	0	–6
Slavic Party				2,197	0.01	0	0	New
Spiritual Ukraine				1,903	0.01	0	0	New
Union of Anarchists of Ukraine				1,696	0.01	0	0	New
Social-Patriotic Assembly of Slavs				1,620	0.01	0	0	New
Meritocratic Party of Ukraine				1,599	0.01	0	0	New
Young Ukraine				1,583	0.01	0	0	New
Civil Solidarity Party				1,579	0.01	0	0	New
Christian Democratic Party of Ukraine				1,210	0.01	0	0	New
Sam za sebe				1,198	0.01	0	0	New
Revival				1,109	0.01	0	0	New
People's Ecological Party				904	0.00	0	0	New
Christian Movement				597	0.00	0	0	New
Youth to Power				564	0.00	0	0	New
Liberal Democratic Party of Ukraine				529	0.00	0	0	New
Political Party of Small and Medium-sized Businesses of Ukraine				504	0.00	0	0	0
Law and Order				497	0.00	0	0	New
European Platform				455	0.00	0	0	New
Internet Party of Ukraine				416	0.00	0	0	New
Bloc Party				397	0.00	0	0	New
All-Ukrainian Union "Center"				366	0.00	0	0	0
For Human Rights				352	0.00	0	0	New
Civil Position				352	0.00	0	0	New
Democratic Party of Ukrainian Hunters				340	0.00	0	0	New
Social Democratic Party of Ukraine (united)				340	0.00	0	0	New
Right Will of Ukraine				243	0.00	0	0	New
Cossack Ukrainian Party				235	0.00	0	0	New
All-Ukrainian Political Party "Fraternity"				188	0.00	0	0	New
Party of Free Democrats				186	0.00	0	0	0
People's Order Party				124	0.00	0	0	New
Independents				5,248,373	26.19	43	43	New
Vacant						5	5	–
Total	20,388,019	100.00	225	20,037,071	100.00	225	450	0
Valid votes	20,388,019	98.03						
Invalid/blank votes	409,068	1.97						
Total votes	20,797,087	100.00						
Registered voters/turnout	36,213,010	57.43						
Source: CLEA

=== By electoral district ===
Next to the 87 political parties 1150 independent candidates took part in the 225 electoral districts.

List of 225 Electoral districts
№	Region		District		Candidate	Votes %	Party member
№	Name	# of mandates	Name	Number	Candidate	Votes %	Party member
1	AR Crimea	10	Simferopol-Tsentralny	001	Vitalina Dzoz	38.76	Party of Regions
1	AR Crimea	10	Simferopol-Kyivsky	002	Lev Myrymsky	36.45	Union
1	AR Crimea	10	Dzhankoi	003	Olena Netetska	50.37	Party of Regions
1	AR Crimea	10	Yevpatoria	004	Oleh Paraskiv	34.00	Party of Regions
1	AR Crimea	10	Kerch	005	Valentyna Lyutikova	41.81	Party of Regions
1	AR Crimea	10	Feodosia	006	Yulia Lyovochkina	60.01	Party of Regions
1	AR Crimea	10	Yalta	007	Serhiy Braiko	52.21	Party of Regions
1	AR Crimea	10	Sudak	008	Borys Deich	62.42	Party of Regions
1	AR Crimea	10	Krasnoperekopsk	009	Oleksandr Nechayev	58.07	Party of Regions
1	AR Crimea	10	Bakhchysarai	010	Hryhoriy Hruba	41.60	Party of Regions
2	Vinnytsia	8	Vinnytsia	011	Oleksandr Dombrovsky^{recognized as invalid}	30.16	
2	Vinnytsia	8	Vinnytsia	012	Petro Poroshenko	71.52	
2	Vinnytsia	8	Kalynivka	013	Mykola Katerynchuk	64.34	Fatherland
2	Vinnytsia	8	Zhmerynka	014	Viktor Zherebnyuk	33.32	
2	Vinnytsia	8	Sharhorod	015	Mykola Dzhyha	39.65	Party of Regions
2	Vinnytsia	8	Yampil	016	Oksana Kaletnyk	43.22	
2	Vinnytsia	8	Ladyzhyn	017	Hryhoriy Zabolotny	46.73	
2	Vinnytsia	8	Ilyinets	018	Hryhoriy Kaletnik	46.15	
3	Volyn	5	Volodymyr-Volynskyi	019	Yevhen Melnyk	36.46	Freedom
3	Volyn	5	Horokhiv	020	Serhiy Martynyak	29.61	
3	Volyn	5	Kovel	021	Stepan Ivakhiv	37.23	
3	Volyn	5	Lutsk	022	Ihor Palytsia	40.27	
3	Volyn	5	Manevychi	023	Ihor Yeremeyev	48.50	
4	Dnipropetrovsk	17	Dnipropetrovsk-Industrialny	024	Yakiv Bezbakh	43.06	
4	Dnipropetrovsk	17	Dnipropetrovsk-Krasnohvardiysky	025	Ihor Tsyrkin	40.94	Party of Regions
4	Dnipropetrovsk	17	Dnipropetrovsk-Babushkinsky	026	Ivan Stupak	51.84	Party of Regions
4	Dnipropetrovsk	17	Dnipropetrovsk-Zhovtnevy	027	Oleksandr Momot	38.25	Party of Regions
4	Dnipropetrovsk	17	Dnipropetrovsk-Lyeninsky	028	Yevhen Morozenko	33.87	Party of Regions
4	Dnipropetrovsk	17	Dnipropetrovsk	029	Viktor Butkivsky	41.40	Party of Regions
4	Dnipropetrovsk	17	Dniprodzerzhynsk	030	Kostyantyn Huzenko	32.81	Party of Regions
4	Dnipropetrovsk	17	Kryvyi Rih-Ternivsky	031	Kostyantyn Pavlov	43.37	Party of Regions
4	Dnipropetrovsk	17	Kryvyi Rih-Dovhynetsky	032	Yuriy Lyubonenko	46.70	Party of Regions
4	Dnipropetrovsk	17	Kryvyi Rih-Tsentralnomisky	033	Vyacheslav Zadorozhny	45.82	Party of Regions
4	Dnipropetrovsk	17	Tsarychanka	034	Serhiy Hlazunov	43.24	Party of Regions
4	Dnipropetrovsk	17	Nikopol	035	Andriy Shypko	43.51	Party of Regions
4	Dnipropetrovsk	17	Pavlohrad	036	Artur Martovytsky	54.82	Party of Regions
4	Dnipropetrovsk	17	Kryvyi Rih	037	Dnytro Shpenov	52.66	Party of Regions
4	Dnipropetrovsk	17	Novomoskovsk	038	Mykola Soloshenko	37.04	Party of Regions
4	Dnipropetrovsk	17	Vasylkivka	039	Yuriy Samoilenko	51.37	Party of Regions
4	Dnipropetrovsk	17	Marhanets	040	Oleh Tsaryov	45.07	Party of Regions
5	Donetsk	21	Donetsk-Budyonnivsky	041	Oleksandr Bobkov	80.85	Party of Regions
5	Donetsk	21	Donetsk-Voroshilovsky	042	Tetyana Bakhteyeva	65.51	Party of Regions
5	Donetsk	21	Donetsk-Lyeninsky	043	Valentyn Landyk	50.87	Party of Regions
5	Donetsk	21	Donetsk-Kirovsky	044	Mykola Levchenko	79.31	Party of Regions
5	Donetsk	21	Donetsk-Kyivsky	045	Yukhym Zvyahilsky	72.59	Party of Regions
5	Donetsk	21	Bakhmut	046	Serhiy Klyuyev	73.10	Party of Regions
5	Donetsk	21	Sloviansk	047	Oleksiy Azarov	76.10	Party of Regions
5	Donetsk	21	Kramatorsk	048	Yuriy Boyarsky	55.12	Party of Regions
5	Donetsk	21	Kostiantynivka	049	Denys Omelianovych	63.94	Party of Regions
5	Donetsk	21	Krasnoarmiysk	050	Leonid Baisarov	72.71	Party of Regions
5	Donetsk	21	Horlivka	051	Anatoliy Honcharov	40.11	Party of Regions
5	Donetsk	21	Dzerzhynsk	052	Ihor Shkirya	60.74	Party of Regions
5	Donetsk	21	Yenakiieve	053	Leonid Lytvynov	78.86	Party of Regions
5	Donetsk	21	Shakhtarsk	054	Vladyslav Lukianov	77.15	Party of Regions
5	Donetsk	21	Makiivka-Hirnytsky	055	Valeriy Omelchenko	69.30	Party of Regions
5	Donetsk	21	Makiivka-Tsentralnomisky	056	Vitaliy Bort	71.08	Party of Regions
5	Donetsk	21	Mariupol-Ilyichivsky	057	Serhiy Matviyenkov	60.50	Party of Regions
5	Donetsk	21	Mariupol-Zhovtnevy	058	Oleksiy Bilyi	50.41	Party of Regions
5	Donetsk	21	Marinka	059	Oleksandr Vasyliev	64.16	Party of Regions
5	Donetsk	21	Volnovakha	060	Oleksandr Ryzhenkov	57.70	Party of Regions
5	Donetsk	21	Starobesheve	061	Andriy Ponomaryov	54.76	Party of Regions
6	Zhytomyr	6	Zhytomyr	062	Hennadiy Zubko	60.97	Fatherland
6	Zhytomyr	6	Berdychiv	063	Anzhelika Labunska	25.37	
6	Zhytomyr	6	Korosten	064	Volodymyr Pekhov	32.75	Party of Regions
6	Zhytomyr	6	Novohrad-Volynskyi	065	Volodymyr Lytvyn	66.53	People's Party
6	Zhytomyr	6	Malyn	066	Vitaliy Zhuravsky	25.07	Party of Regions
6	Zhytomyr	6	Chudniv	067	Viktor Razvadovsky	47.79	
7	Zakarpattia	6	Uzhhorod	068	Vasyl Kovach	31.14	Party of Regions
7	Zakarpattia	6	Mukacheve	069	Viktor Baloha	49.42	United Centre
7	Zakarpattia	6	Svaliava	070	Mykhailo Lanyo	60.20	Party of Regions
7	Zakarpattia	6	Khust	071	Pavlo Baloha^{recognized as invalid}	35.13	United Centre
7	Zakarpattia	6	Tiachiv	072	Vasyl Petyovka	54.67	United Centre
7	Zakarpattia	6	Vynohradiv	073	Ivan Bushko	41.22	Party of Regions
8	Zaporizhzhia	9	Zaporizhzhia-Kommunarsky	074	Yaroslav Sukhyi	24.92	Party of Regions
8	Zaporizhzhia	9	Zaporizhzhia-Lyeninsky	075	Serhiy Kaltsev	38.40	Party of Regions
8	Zaporizhzhia	9	Zaporizhzhia-Ordzhonikidzevsky	076	Yevhen Kartashov	31.59	Party of Regions
8	Zaporizhzhia	9	Zaporizhzhia-Shevchenkivsky	077	Vyacheslav Bohuslayev	50.11	Party of Regions
8	Zaporizhzhia	9	Berdiansk	078	Oleksandr Ponomaryov	49.96	
8	Zaporizhzhia	9	Vasylivka	079	Volodymyr Bandurov	55.85	Party of Regions
8	Zaporizhzhia	9	Melitopol	080	Yevhen Balytsky	54.46	Party of Regions
8	Zaporizhzhia	9	Tokmak	081	Artem Pshonka	65.44	Party of Regions
8	Zaporizhzhia	9	Polohy	082	Oleksandr Dudka	39.87	Party of Regions
9	Ivano-Frankivsk	7	Ivano-Frankivsk	083	Oleksandr Sych	55.81	Freedom
9	Ivano-Frankivsk	7	Tysmenytsia	084	Volodymyr Kupchak	47.41	Fatherland
9	Ivano-Frankivsk	7	Kalush	085	Olha Sikora	54.61	Fatherland
9	Ivano-Frankivsk	7	Dolyna	086	Anatoliy Dyriv	29.02	Fatherland
9	Ivano-Frankivsk	7	Nadvirna	087	Yuriy Derevianko	41.53	
9	Ivano-Frankivsk	7	Kolomyia	088	Oleksandr Doniy	43.95	
9	Ivano-Frankivsk	7	Sniatyn	089	Vasyl Hladiy	48.57	Fatherland
10	Kyiv Oblast	9	Bila Tserkva	090	Vitaliy Chudnovsky	34.18	
10	Kyiv Oblast	9	Makariv	091	Ruslan Solvar	51.62	UDAR
10	Kyiv Oblast	9	Uzyn	092	Serhiy Katsuba	33.67	Party of Regions
10	Kyiv Oblast	9	Myronivka	093	Oleksandr Onyshchenko	46.83	Party of Regions
10	Kyiv Oblast	9	Obukhiv	094	Tetyana Zasukha^{recognized as invalid}	41.80	Party of Regions
10	Kyiv Oblast	9	Irpin	095	Vyacheslav Kutovy	26.90	Fatherland
10	Kyiv Oblast	9	Vyshhorod	096	Yaroslav Moskalenko	38.97	Party of Regions
10	Kyiv Oblast	9	Brovary	097	Pavlo Rizanenko	31.04	UDAR
10	Kyiv Oblast	9	Yahotyn	098	Serhiy Mishchenko	34.33	
11	Kirovohrad	5	Kirovohrad	099	Andriy Tabalov	32.80	Fatherland
11	Kirovohrad	5	Bobrynets	100	Stanislav Berezkin	36.88	Party of Regions
11	Kirovohrad	5	Holovanivsk	101	Vitaliy Hrushevsky	30.77	Party of Regions
11	Kirovohrad	5	Znamianka	102	Oleksandr Yedin	29.10	Party of Regions
11	Kirovohrad	5	Oleksandriia	103	Serhiy Kuzmenko	45.51	Party of Regions
12	Luhansk	11	Luhansk-Artemivsky	104	Volodymyr Struk	39.98	
12	Luhansk	11	Luhansk-Zhovtnevy	105	Serhiy Horokhov	59.70	Party of Regions
12	Luhansk	11	Severodonetsk	106	Oleksiy Kunchenko	41.41	Party of Regions
12	Luhansk	11	Lysychansk	107	Serhiy Dunayev	42.58	Party of Regions
12	Luhansk	11	Krasnyi Luch	108	Valeriy Moshensky	35.19	
12	Luhansk	11	Krasnodon	109	Volodymyr Medyanyk	44.13	Party of Regions
12	Luhansk	11	Alchevsk	110	Volodymyr Chub	48.08	Party of Regions
12	Luhansk	11	Sverdlovsk	111	Oleksandr Koval	52.04	Party of Regions
12	Luhansk	11	Rubizhne	112	Yuliy Ioffe	46.88	Party of Regions
12	Luhansk	11	Svatove	113	Viktor Tykhonov	60.18	Party of Regions
12	Luhansk	11	Stanytsia Luhanska	114	Volodymyr Demishkan	64.87	Party of Regions
13	Lviv	12	Lviv-Sykhivsky	115	Mykhailo Khmil	43.09	Fatherland
13	Lviv	12	Lviv-Zaliznychny	116	Iryna Farion	68.02	Freedom
13	Lviv	12	Lviv-Frankivsky	117	Ihor Vasyunyk	27.34	Fatherland
13	Lviv	12	Lviv-Lychakivsky	118	Yuriy Mykhalchyshyn	57.21	Freedom
13	Lviv	12	Brody	119	Iryna Sekh	64.86	Freedom
13	Lviv	12	Horodok	120	Yaroslav Dubnevych	47.04	
13	Lviv	12	Drohobych	121	Roman Ilyk	49.11	Fatherland
13	Lviv	12	Yavoriv	122	Vasyl Pazynyak	55.86	Fatherland
13	Lviv	12	Peremyshliany	123	Lidiya Kotelyak	30.12	Fatherland
13	Lviv	12	Sokal	124	Stepan Kurpil	61.73	Fatherland
13	Lviv	12	Staryi Sambir	125	Andriy Tyahnybok	35.61	Freedom
13	Lviv	12	Stryi	126	Oleh Kanivets	41.20	All-Ukrainian Union "Fatherland"
14	Mykolaiv	6	Mykolaiv-Zavodsky	127	Volodymyr Nakonechny	45.77	Party of Regions
14	Mykolaiv	6	Mykolaiv-Lyeninsky	128	Artem Iliuk	37.96	Party of Regions
14	Mykolaiv	6	Mykolaiv	129	Mykola Zhuk	48.04	Party of Regions
14	Mykolaiv	6	Bashtanka	130	Ihor Brychenko	42.23	Fatherland
14	Mykolaiv	6	Voznesensk	131	Yuriy Herzhov	44.21	Party of Regions
14	Mykolaiv	6	Pervomaisk	132	Vitaliy Travyanko^{recognized as invalid}	39.97	Party of Regions
15	Odesa	11	Odesa-Kyivsky	133	Ihor Markov^{recognized as invalid}	26.60	
15	Odesa	11	Odesa-Malynovsky	134	Serhiy Hrynevetsky	32.03	People's Party
15	Odesa	11	Odesa-Prymorsky	135	Serhiy Kivalov	56.79	Party of Regions
15	Odesa	11	Odesa-Suvorovsky	136	Hennadiy Trukhanov	60.91	Party of Regions
15	Odesa	11	Kotovsk	137	Leonid Klimov	48.46	Party of Regions
15	Odesa	11	Shyriaieve	138	Ivan Fursin	57.65	Party of Regions
15	Odesa	11	Rozdilna	139	Oleksandr Presman	53.58	Party of Regions
15	Odesa	11	Biliaivka	140	Davyd Zhvaniya	32.07	
15	Odesa	11	Tatarbunary	141	Vitaliy Barvinenko	41.53	Party of Regions
15	Odesa	11	Artsyz	142	Anton Kisse	39.06	
15	Odesa	11	Izmail	143	Yuriy Kruk	23.76	Party of Regions
16	Poltava	8	Poltava-Oktyabrsky	144	Serhiy Kaplin	32.21	UDAR
16	Poltava	8	Poltava-Kyivsky	145	Yuriy Bublyk	36.45	Freedom
16	Poltava	8	Kremenchuk	146	Yuriy Shapovalov	34.35	
16	Poltava	8	Myrhorod	147	Oleh Kulinich	43.32	
16	Poltava	8	Lubny	148	Volodymyr Pylypenko	47.41	
16	Poltava	8	Karlivka	149	Oleksiy Lelyuk	35.67	Party of Regions
16	Poltava	8	Komsomolsk	150	Kostyantyn Zhevaho	61.20	
16	Poltava	8	Lokhvytsia	151	Taras Kutovy	41.27	UDAR
17	Rivne	5	Rivne	152	Oleh Osukhovsky	39.75	Freedom
17	Rivne	5	Ostroh	153	Yuriy Voznyuk	48.32	Fatherland
17	Rivne	5	Dubno	154	Valentyn Korolyuk	38.65	Fatherland
17	Rivne	5	Dubrovytsia	155	Mykola Soroka	32.76	Party of Regions
17	Rivne	5	Sarny	156	Mykola Kucheruk	32.17	Fatherland
18	Sumy	6	Sumy	157	Oleh Medunytsia	41.75	Fatherland
18	Sumy	6	Bilopillia	158	Oleksandr Volkov	40.14	
18	Sumy	6	Hlukhiv	159	Andriy Derkach	63.37	Party of Regions
18	Sumy	6	Shostka	160	Ihor Molotyuk	31.50	
18	Sumy	6	Romny	161	Volodymyr Shulha	42.70	Fatherland
18	Sumy	6	Okhtyrka	162	Iryna Kupreichyk	34.55	Fatherland
19	Ternopil	5	Ternopil	163	Oleksiy Kaida	56.65	Freedom
19	Ternopil	5	Zbarazh	164	Mykhailo Holovko	45.33	Freedom
19	Ternopil	5	Zboriv	165	Volodymyr Boyko	39.53	Fatherland
19	Ternopil	5	Terebovlya	166	Mykhailo Apostol	38.97	Fatherland
19	Ternopil	5	Chortkiv	167	Ivan Stoiko	33.68	Fatherland
20	Kharkiv	14	Kharkiv-Dzerzhynsky	168	Valeriy Pysarenko	43.44	Party of Regions
20	Kharkiv	14	Kharkiv-Kyivsky	169	Iryna Berezhna	41.82	Party of Regions
20	Kharkiv	14	Kharkiv-Moskovsky	170	Dmytro Svyatash	38.39	Party of Regions
20	Kharkiv	14	Kharkiv-Frunzensky	171	Iryna Horina	46.31	Party of Regions
20	Kharkiv	14	Kharkiv-Ordzhonikidzevsky	172	Volodymyr Mysyk	51.97	Party of Regions
20	Kharkiv	14	Kharkiv-Kominternivsky	173	Anatoliy Denysenko	50.60	Party of Regions
20	Kharkiv	14	Kharkiv-Lyeninsky	174	Oleksandr Feldman	59.28	Party of Regions
20	Kharkiv	14	Derhachi	175	Volodymyr Katsuba	54.84	Party of Regions
20	Kharkiv	14	Chuhuiv	176	Dmytro Shentsev	58.64	Party of Regions
20	Kharkiv	14	Kupiansk	177	Viktor Ostapchuk	56.82	Party of Regions
20	Kharkiv	14	Balakliia	178	Dmytro Dobkin	65.59	Party of Regions
20	Kharkiv	14	Krasnohrad	179	Anatoliy Hirshfeld	45.16	Party of Regions
20	Kharkiv	14	Zolochiv	180	Oleksandr Bilovol	55.32	Party of Regions
20	Kharkiv	14	Zmiiv	181	Yevhen Murayev	56.15	Party of Regions
21	Kherson	5	Kherson-Suvorovsky	182	Volodymyr Saldo	37.90	Party of Regions
21	Kherson	5	Kherson-Komsomolsky	183	Andriy Putilov	39.49	UDAR
21	Kherson	5	Nova Kakhovka	184	Mykola Dmytruk	19.98	Party of Regions
21	Kherson	5	Kakhovka	185	Mykhailo Opanashchenko	25.31	Party of Regions
21	Kherson	5	Tsyurupinsk	186	Fedir Nehoi	30.52	
22	Khmelnytskyi	7	Khmelnytskyi	187	Oleh Lukashuk	40.34	Fatherland
22	Khmelnytskyi	7	Khmelnytskyi	188	Serhiy Labazyuk	28.39	
22	Khmelnytskyi	7	Krasyliv	189	Ihor Sabiy	19.39	Freedom
22	Khmelnytskyi	7	Shepetivka	190	Serhiy Buryak	42.65	
22	Khmelnytskyi	7	Starokostiantyniv	191	Viktor Bondar	25.40	
22	Khmelnytskyi	7	Dunaivtsi	192	Oleksandr Hereha	58.04	
22	Khmelnytskyi	7	Kamianets-Podilskyi	193	Volodymyr Melnychenko	44.20	
23	Cherkasy	7	Cherkasy-Prydniprovsky	194	Mykola Bulatetsky^{recognized as invalid}	40.79	Fatherland
23	Cherkasy	7	Cherkasy-Sosnivsky	195	Volodymyr Zubyk	43.80	
23	Cherkasy	7	Korsun-Shevchenkivskyi	196	Hennadiy Bobov	42.73	Party of Regions
23	Cherkasy	7	Kaniv	197	Bohdan Hubsky^{recognized as invalid}	35.65	
23	Cherkasy	7	Smila	198	Viktor Tymoshenko	29.40	
23	Cherkasy	7	Zhashkiv	199	Valentyn Nychyporenko	28.74	
23	Cherkasy	7	Uman	200	Anton Yatsenko	29.90	Party of Regions
24	Chernivtsi	4	Chernivtsi	201	Mykola Fedoruk	52.04	Fatherland
24	Chernivtsi	4	Storozhynets	202	Oleksandr Fyshchuk	40.31	Fatherland
24	Chernivtsi	4	Novoselytsia	203	Hennadiy Fedoryak	51.73	Party of Regions
24	Chernivtsi	4	Khotyn	204	Artem Semenyuk	57.54	Party of Regions
25	Chernihiv	6	Chernihiv-Desnyansky	205	Valeriy Dubil	50.20	Fatherland
25	Chernihiv	6	Chernihiv-Novozavodsky	206	Vladyslav Atroshenko	40.63	
25	Chernihiv	6	Koriukivka	207	Ihor Rybakov	38.13	
25	Chernihiv	6	Bakhmach	208	Oleh Lyashko	55.67	Radical Party
25	Chernihiv	6	Nizhyn	209	Ivan Kurovsky	46.52	
25	Chernihiv	6	Pryluky	210	Mykola Rudkovsky	34.22	
26	Kyiv City	13	Kyiv-Holosiyivsky	211	Serhiy Teryokhin	30.40	Fatherland
26	Kyiv City	13	Kyiv-Darnytsky	212	Vitaliy Yarema	30.22	Fatherland
26	Kyiv City	13	Kyiv-Desnyansky	213	Volodymyr Yavorivsky	36.66	Fatherland
26	Kyiv City	13	Kyiv-Dniprovsky	214	Viktor Chumak	38.91	UDAR
26	Kyiv City	13	Kyvi-Desnyansky	215	Andriy Illyenko	33.14	Freedom
26	Kyiv City	13	Kyiv-Dniprovsky	216	Kseniya Lyapina	29.27	Fatherland
26	Kyiv City	13	Kyiv-Obolonsky	217	Oleksandr Bryhynets	31.75	Fatherland
26	Kyiv City	13	Kyiv-Svyatoshynsky	218	Volodymyr Ariev	38.85	Fatherland
26	Kyiv City	13	Kyiv-Svyatoshynsky	219	Volodymyr Bondarenko	44.20	Fatherland
26	Kyiv City	13	Kyiv-Podilsky	220	Oleksandr Chernovolenko	32.03	Fatherland
26	Kyiv City	13	Kyiv-Pechersky	221	Leonid Yemets	30.52	Fatherland
26	Kyiv City	13	Kyiv-Solomyansky	222	Dmytro Andriyevsky	33.87	Fatherland
26	Kyiv City	13	Kyiv-Shevchenkivsky	223	Viktor Pylypyshyn^{recognized as invalid}	27.57	
27	Sevastopol	2	Sevastopol-Gagarinsky	224	Pavlo Lebedyev/Vadim Novinsky (after 7 July 2013 by-election)	42.64	Party of Regions
27	Sevastopol	2	Sevastopol-Leninsky	225	Vadym Kolesnichenko	43.01	Party of Regions
Notes: ^{^{recognized as invalid}}The Central Election Commission of Ukraine adopted a resolution on November 5 recognizing the impossibility of announcing parliament election results in five single-seat constituencies (electoral districts 94, 132, 194, 197 and 223) and it recognized the need to hold repeat elections in these constituencies and asked parliament to take a decision on holding repeat elections in these constituencies. On November 6 the Verkhovna Rada adopted a resolution that proposed that. On 8 November the Central Election Commission stated that the Verkhovna Rada then should make a respective law for this and the Cabinet of Ministers of Ukraine should determine the amount of funding for these elections. On 8 February 2013 the Supreme Administrative Court of Ukraine deprived people's deputies Baloha and Dombrovsk (electoral districts 11 and 71) of their mandates of which they were stripped on 3 July 2013. On 12 September 2013 the same court deprived deputy Ihor Markov (electoral district 133) of his mandate.

Several lawmakers elected into the new parliament have family ties with other lawmakers or other family members in the executive branch of Ukrainian politics.

=== Party list results by oblast ===
Region	Party of Regions		Batkivshchyna		Svoboda		Communist Party		UDAR		Others		Turnout %
Region	Votes	%	Votes	%	Votes	%	Votes	%	Votes	%	Votes	%	Turnout %
Crimea	384,052	52.34	96,074	13.09	7,637	1.04	142,450	19.41	52,627	7.17	50,829	6.93	49.45
Cherkasy	116,855	18.65	236,664	37.78	59,414	9.48	58,241	9.29	107,960	17.23	47,132	7.53	61.46
Chernihiv	105,618	20.09	161,518	30.73	31,473	5.98	69,366	13.20	67,878	12.91	89,631 (Note: Of these, 56,209 votes were cast for the Radical Party of Oleh Liashko.)	17.06 (Note: Of these, 10.69% were cast for the Radical Party of Oleh Liashko.)	61.09
Chernivtsi	84,517	20.77	161,134	39.60	35,450	8.71	22,251	5.46	77,837	19.13	25,624	6.30	59.66
Dnipropetrovsk	497,542	35.79	255,519	18.38	72,257	5.19	269,382	19.38	203,115	14.61	92,171	6.63	52.97
Donetsk	1,274,915	65.09	103,105	5.26	23,557	1.20	369,364	18.85	92,369	4.71	95,267	4.86	59.63
Ivano-Frankivsk	34,076	5.18	251,054	38.21	222,013	33.79	11,754	1.78	100,235	15.25	37,858	5.76	61.86
Kharkiv	464,143	40.98	172,295	15.21	43,461	3.83	235,998	20.84	145,232	12.82	71,238	6.29	53.08
Kherson	126,055	29.34	93,661	21.80	20,255	4.71	100,292	23.34	58,566	13.63	30,701	7.15	50.90
Khmelnytskyi	120,110	18.69	242,270	37.71	75,748	11.79	56,608	8.81	104,949	16.33	42,757	6.66	62.34
Kyiv (city)	165,120	12.60	406,086	30.99	227,118	17.33	94,733	7.23	333,406	25.45	83,499	6.37	62.11
Kyiv Oblast	180,284	21.00	314,520	36.63	93,082	10.84	52,485	6.11	160,831	18.73	57,215	6.67	61.98
Kirovohrad	109,835	26.25	134,560	32.17	26,026	6.22	56,334	13.46	62,229	14.87	29,278	7.00	54.25
Luhansk	579,589	57.06	55,785	5.49	13,203	1.29	255,368	25.14	48,176	4.74	63,619	6.26	57.67
Lviv	61,794	4.70	466,352	35.48	499,703	38.02	26,256	1.99	189,803	14.44	70,218	5.34	67.12
Mykolaiv	191,528	40.51	80,052	16.93	20,356	4.30	90,260	19.09	59,168	12.51	31,417	6.65	52.19
Odesa	363,210	41.90	134,301	15.49	28,618	3.30	157,444	18.16	119,406	13.77	63,670	7.35	49.64
Poltava	149,428	21.91	205,593	30.14	54,206	7.94	92,013	13.49	125,978	18.47	54,725	8.02	57.89
Rivne	83,057	15.80	192,332	36.59	87,444	16.63	32,645	6.21	90,694	17.25	39,369	7.49	61.83
Sevastopol	68,945	46.90	8,623	5.86	2,026	1.37	43,315	29.46	7,414	5.04	16,671 (Note: Of these, 8,058 votes were cast for the Russian Bloc.)	11.34 (Note: Of these, 5.48% were cast for the Russian Bloc.)	49.65
Sumy	111,844	21.09	192,319	36.27	33,783	6.37	64,895	12.24	88,608	16.71	38,726	7.30	57.68
Ternopil	36,190	6.40	220,743	39.04	176,534	31.22	10,869	1.92	82,995	14.68	38,008	6.72	66.78
Vinnytsia	138,619	17.38	358,878	45.01	67,024	8.40	70,659	8.86	106,689	13.38	55,445	6.95	62.89
Volyn	65,127	12.92	198,874	39.46	90,612	17.98	35,132	6.97	80,471	15.96	33,679	6.68	65.74
Zakarpattia	144,631	30.87	129,739	27.69	39,160	8.35	23,605	5.03	93,850	20.03	37,491	8.00	51.61
Zaporizhzhia	327,160	40.95	119,271	14.93	30,758	3.85	169,053	21.16	99,068	12.40	53,509	6.70	55.97
Zhytomyr	127,749	21.61	213,714	36.15	44,188	7.47	75,790	12.82	83,908	14.19	45,691	7.73	59.32
Overseas	4,753	23.27	4,054	19.85	4,827	23.63	707	3.46	4,517	22.11	1,564	7.66	4.85
Ukraine	6,116,746	30.00	5,209,090	25.54	2,129,933	10.44	2,687,269	13.18	2,847,979	13.96	1,397,002	6.85	57.98
Source: Central Election Commission

=== Foreign electoral district ===
Despite the turnout in the foreign electoral district being the lowest on record, Svoboda surprisingly received the most votes, with 24% of the popular vote, while the national winners, the Party of Regions, came second with 23% of the vote. UDAR and Batkivshchyna received 22% and 20% of the vote respectively, while Our Ukraine, following the national trend, saw its vote share reduced by 23 percentage points, falling from third to sixth place.

=== Turnout ===
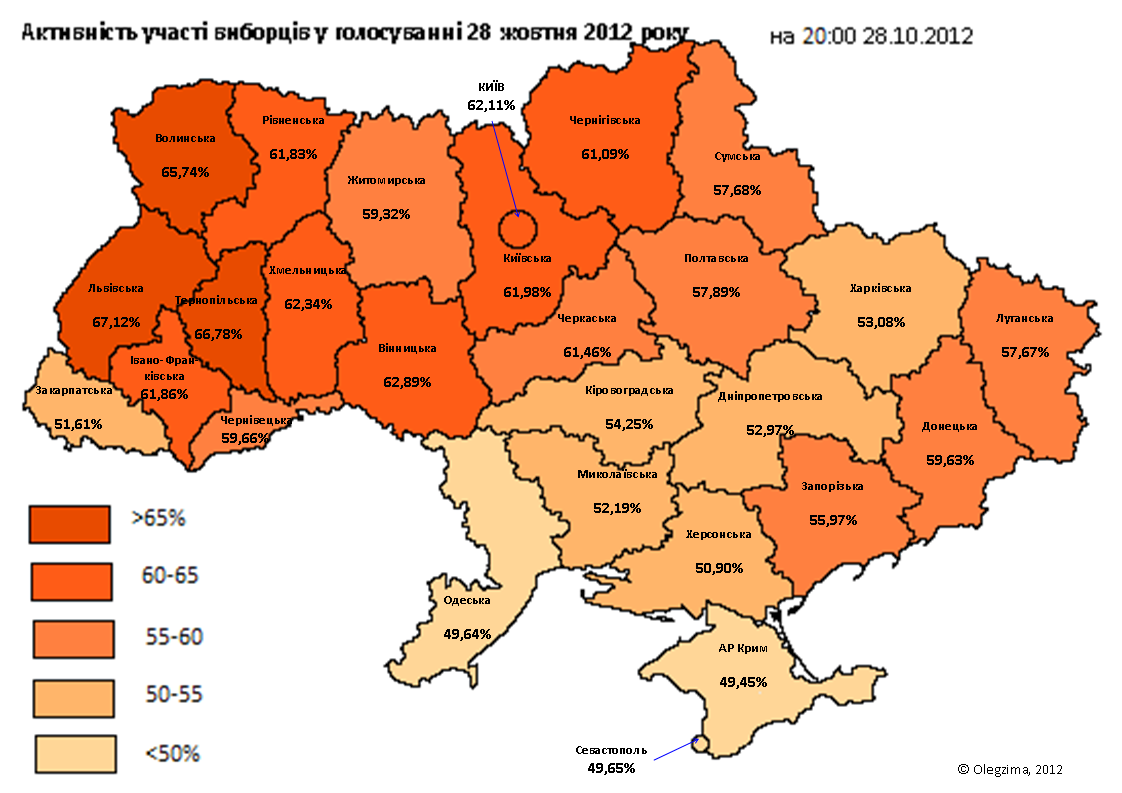
Turnout by oblast

The total voter turnout in the election was 57.99%; about average for parliamentary elections in Ukraine. On election day turnout had reached 22.43% by noon local time. The number of reported participating voters varied somewhere between 20.76 million and 20.78 million, while the number of invalid ballots accumulated to about 1.2 million (5.74%) for party list voting and voting at districts.

The lowest turnout was in Crimea (with 49.46%), the highest in Lviv Oblast (67.13%). Local disparities in turnout did occur: for example, the voting turnout figures in two adjacent districts in Donetsk were 39.8% and 84.5%.

== Reactions ==
Fatherland, UDAR and Svoboda stated 12 November they did not recognize the results and would challenge them in local and international courts. In a joint statement the three parties vowed to work towards the impeachment of President Viktor Yanukovych, the resignation of the Azarov Government and chief prosecutor Viktor Pshonka, and the release from jail of Yulia Tymoshenko "and other political prisoners".

Prime Minister Mykola Azarov and President Yanukovych praised the elections.

Party leader Petro Symonenko of the Communist Party of Ukraine believed on 8 November that the new parliament could not work better than the present one, as "there will be a confrontation between the financial, political and clan groups who got seats in the new parliament." He also stated then that his party will not form any coalition with other groups in the new parliament.

Civil movement "Chesno" stated on 5 December 2012 that 331 out of the 450 deputies elected on 28 October fell short of its criteria for honesty; according to "Chesno"'s parameters, 114 of them violated the rights and freedoms of citizens, 30 earlier changed their political position while working in parliament or on local councils, 233 had been involved in corrupt practices, 185 had nontransparent incomes and expenses, 156 did not personally take part in voting in previous parliaments, and 101 had shirked work in parliament.

Party of Regions politician Sergei Tigipko stated in December 2012 "the parliamentary elections showed that politics in Ukraine is becoming more ideological".

=== International reactions ===
European Union – On 12 November 2012 the High Representative of the Union for Foreign Affairs and Security Policy Catherine Ashton and European Commissioner for Enlargement and European Neighbourhood Policy Stefan Fule stated "We express our concern about the conduct of the post electoral process, which was marred by irregularities, delays in the vote count and lack of transparency in the electoral commissions". The also expected to see "swift and determined action" to bring Ukraine's electoral legislation "into line with European norms and standards on the basis of an Election Code".
United States – United States Secretary of State Hillary Clinton stated in late October 2012 about the election: "We share the view of OSCE monitors that Sunday's election constituted a step backward for Ukrainian democracy". Vice President of the United States Joe Biden voiced concerns over the elections in a call with President Viktor Yanukovych on 13 November 2012 and end urged Ukraine to "end selective prosecutions".
European Parliament – A resolution adopted by the parliament on 13 December 2012 stated: "(We) expresses regret at the fact that, according to the OSCE, PACE, NATO Parliamentary Assembly and European Parliament observers, the election campaign, electoral process and post-electoral process failed to meet major international standards and constitute a step backwards compared with the national elections in 2010.
Poland – According to President Bronislaw Komorowski the results of the elections showed "the success of pro-European spirit in the country". Because all political parties that made it into parliament, but the Communist Party of Ukraine, declared European integration of the country as one of their goals.

== Aftermath ==
=== Government formation ===
On 9 December President Viktor Yanukovych nominated Mykola Azarov for a new term as Prime Minister. This nomination was approved by parliament on 13 December 2012. 252 deputies of the 450 deputies supported the nomination; the whole factions of Party of Regions (210 deputies) and Communist Party (32 deputies) and ten independent deputies.

The second Azarov Government was appointed by Yanukovych on 24 December 2012.

=== Factions formed in parliament ===
According to the amendment to parliamentary regulations adopted in November 2012, the smallest faction of parliament can be formed out a party with the smallest number of deputies elected by a party list and a single constituency vote. That amendment to regulations can also be interpreted as "either or" meaning that the smallest faction can be formed either based on party list or a single constituency election. In that case the smaller parties' deputies that were elected to the parliament will be able to form factions of their own, making it more challenging to form a coalition in the Ukrainian parliament.

On 27 November 2012 Party of Regions parliamentary leader Oleksandr Yefremov claimed that 223 members of the Verkhovna Rada had already expressed their desire to work in his party's fraction; according to earlier press reports 38 of the 43 unaffiliated politicians elected into parliament would join the Party of Regions faction.

	Party (Shading indicates majority caucus)									Total	Vacant
	Party of Regions	Batkivshchyna	UDAR	Svoboda	Communists	Economic Development	Sovereign European Ukraine	For Peace and Stability	Non-affiliated (Note: The United Centre (3 seats), People's Party (2 seats), Radical Party of Oleh Liashko (1 seat) and Union (1 seat) did not form their own faction. Their deputies did not join any faction besides 1 deputy of People's Party who became a member of the Party of Regions faction in December 2012 and Union's deputy joined the then newly created faction For Peace and Stability on 2 July 2014.)	Total	Vacant
End of previous convocation	195	97	DNP	DNP	25	DNP	DNP	DNP	31	348	102
Begin	185	101	40	37	32	-	-	-	43	438	12
12 December 2012	208	99	42	36	32	-	-	-	27	444	6
11 June 2013	207	93	42	36	32	-	-	-	34	444	6
31 December 2013	204	90	42	36	32	-	-	-	38	442	8
21 February 2014	177	90	42	36	32	-	-	-	55	442	8
22 February 2014	134	88	42	36	32	-	-	-	115	447	3
23 February 2014	131	88	42	36	32	-	-	-	118	447	3
24 February 2014	128	88	42	36	32	-	-	-	123	449	1
25 February 2014	127	88	42	36	32	33	-	-	91	449	1
27 February 2014	122	88	42	36	32	32	37	-	60	449	1
28 February 2014	122	88	42	36	32	36	36	-	57	449	1
4 March 2014	119	87	42	33	32	36	36	-	60	445	5
15 March 2014	120	88	42	35	32	37	36	-	58	448	2
18 March 2014	120	82	41	33	32	37	36	-	58	439	11
25 March 2014	120	88	41	35	32	37	36	-	58	447	3
8 April 2014	109	88	41	34	33	38	36	-	68	446	4
10 April 2014	108	88	41	35	33	38	36	-	70	449	1
11 April 2014	106	88	42	35	33	37	36	-	71	448	2
20 April 2014	104	88	41	35	33	37	36	-	72	446	4
16 May 2014	103	88	41	35	33	39	35	-	73	447	3
29 May 2014	103	87	41	35	31	40	35	-	74	446	4
6 June 2014	80	85	40	35	32	40	35	-	95	442	8
1 July 2014	80	86	41	35	24	40	35	-	104	445	5
2 July 2014	80	86	41	35	24	40	35	32	73	445	5
4 July 2014	78	86	41	35	23	40	35	34	73	445	5
24 July 2014	78	86	41	35	(Note: The Communist Party of Ukraine faction was dissolved 24 July 2014 two days after parliament had changed its regulations.)	41	35	34	95	445	5
25 July 2014	78	86	41	35	-	41	35	36	93	445	5
Latest voting share	17.5%	19.3%	9.2%	7.9%	0.0%	9.2%	7.9%	8.1%	20.9%		

=== Removing deputies from parliament after 2012 election ===
Since 8 February 2013 four parliamentarians have been deprived of their mandate by the Higher Administrative Court of Ukraine.

=== Repeat elections in 5 constituencies ===
The Central Election Commission of Ukraine adopted a resolution on November 5 recognizing the impossibility of announcing election results in five single-seat constituencies (electoral districts 94, 132, 194, 197 and 223); it also recognized the need to hold repeat elections in these constituencies and asked parliament to take a decision on holding repeat elections in these constituencies. On November 6 the Verkhovna Rada adopted a resolution that proposed repeat elections. On 8 November the Central Election Commission stated that the Verkhovna Rada should thus make a respective law for this and the Cabinet of Ministers of Ukraine should determine the amount of funding for these elections.

On 29 December 2012, the Constitutional Court of Ukraine received a query from 54 Verkhovna Rada members concerning procedures for the five repeat elections. As of 21 March 2013 the Constitutional Court has not opened a case on this issue. The current Verkhovna Rada parliamentary majority refused to consider the scheduling of repeated elections in the five constituencies before the court issues its ruling on this issue.

On 5 September 2013 the Verkhovna Rada set the date of (all, see below) 7 re-elections to 15 December 2013.

=== Repeat elections in 2 more constituencies ===
In early February 2013 the Higher Administrative Court of Ukraine ordered the Central Election Commission of Ukraine to hold new elections in 2 more districts after the court removed the deputy mandates of United Centre member Pavlo Baloha (at the time a member of the Party of Regions parliamentary faction) and independent Oleksandr Dombrovsky. The Administrative Court established that the results in single-member districts number 11 (Vinnytsia Oblast; Dombrovsky) and number 71 (Zakarpattia Oblast; Baloha) after the 2012 elections had been "unreliable". On 3 July 2013 Baloha's and Dombrovsky's mandates were officially cancelled.

On 5 September 2013 the Verkhovna Rada set the date of (all, see above) 7 re-elections to 15 December 2013.

=== By-election in constituency 224 (Sevastopol) ===
On 24 December 2012 President Viktor Yanukovych appointed Pavlo Lebedyev as Defense Minister. Lebedyev had been elected as a lawmaker in the single-seat constituency No. 224 (in Sevastopol) in the 2012 election (28 October 2012). On 22 March 2013 the Verkhovna Rada cancelled his parliamentary mandate. The by-election for the single-seat constituency No. 224 was held on 7 July 2013 and won by independent Vadim Novinsky with 53.41% with a turnout of 23.91%. Before the election Novinsky had stated he would join the Party of Regions if he won.

=== Repeat elections in constituency 133 (Odesa) ===
On 12 September 2013 the Higher Administrative Court of Ukraine (under a lawsuit lodged by Yuriy Karmazin) ruled it impossible to reliably establish the results of 28 October 2012 elections in single-mandate constituency No. 133 (in Odesa), at the time Ihor Markov had been declared winner of that constituency. The court overturned the Central Election Commission (CEC) decision of 23 November 2012 regarding Markov's registration as a People's Deputy of Ukraine and ordered the CEC to take measures to organize, prepare for and hold repeat elections in constituency No. 133.

Police officers had documented the use of pens with disappearing ink in at least 40 polling stations in constituency No. 133 on 28 October 2012.

=== Repeat elections in five constituencies of 15 December 2013 ===
The Central Election Commission of Ukraine finalized the vote count on 12 November 2012 but simultaneously ordered – on recommendation of the Verkhovna Rada (Ukraine's parliament) – repeat elections in five troubled single-mandate constituencies where it could not establish results. Because of occurrences in these five constituencies. In February 2013 the Higher Administrative Court of Ukraine ordered to hold (additional) new elections in 2 more districts after the court removed the mandates of two seats. On 5 September 2013 the Verkhovna Rada itself set the date of these 7 re-elections to 15 December 2013. Hence, before 15 December 2013 of the 450 seats in parliament 443 deputies have been elected. But eventually only repeat elections were held in 5 constituencies on 15 December 2013.

Results of 15 December 2013 repeat elections
№	Region	Mandates	Position	District	Name	Votes %	Party list	Party member
10	Kyiv Oblast	9	Central Obukhiv	094	Ruslan Badaev	58.25%		
14	Mykolaiv	6	South-East Pervomaisk	132	Mykola Kruglov	47.85%		
23	Cherkasy	7	Central Cherkasy-Prydniprovsky	194	Mykhailo Poplavskyi	53.54%		
23	Cherkasy	7	Central Kaniv	197	Leonid Datsenko	63.51%	Batkivshchyna	Batkivshchyna
26	Kyiv City	13	Central Kyiv-Shevchenkivsky	223	Viktor Pylypyshyn	44.89%		

=== By-election in constituency 83 (West Ivano-Frankivsk) ===
In February 2014 Oleksandr Sych became Vice Prime Minister in the Yatsenyuk Government. Sych had been elected as a lawmaker in the single-seat constituency No. 83 (West Ivano-Frankivsk) in the 2012 election of 28 October 2012.

The by-election for the single-seat constituency No. 83 was held on 25 May 2014 and won by independent Olexandr Shevchenko with 37.6% with a turnout of 37.66%. The candidate of the party of Sych, Svoboda, came third with 14.9%.

== See also ==
- List of members of the parliament of Ukraine, 2012–2014
- Civil movement "Chesno"
