= Vladyslav Lukianov =

Ukrainian politician and businessman (born 1964)

- Владислав Лук'янов
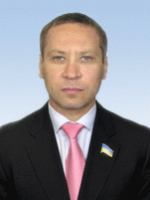
- An official portrait of him from 2012.

People's Deputy of Ukraine
- In office 12 December 2012 – 27 November 2014
- Constituency: Donetsk Oblast, No. 54
- In office 23 November 2007 – 12 December 2012
- Constituency: Party of Regions, No. 155
- In office 25 May 2006 – 23 November 2007
- Constituency: Party of Regions, No. 133

Personal details
- Born: Vladyslav Valentinovich Lukianov; 21 February 1964 (age 62) Kostiantynivka, Ukrainian SSR, Soviet Union
- Party: Party of Regions (2004-2014); Opposition Platform - For Life (2020-2022)
- Education: Odesa National Maritime University (1986); National Academy of Internal Affairs

Vladyslav Valentinovich Lukianov (Ukrainian: Владислав Валентинович Лук'янов; born 21 February 1964) is a Ukrainian politician and businessman who served as a People's Deputy of Ukraine in the Verkhovna Rada from 2006 to 2014, representing the Party of Regions. After the end of his term, he reappeared in Kyiv in 2019 while running for election, although he was not elected. A year later, he was elected to the Bakhmut City Council, although he was arrested and had to give up his mandate in 2024 after it was reported by the SBU that he had attempted to justify the Russian invasion of Ukraine.

== Early life ==
Lukianov was born on 21 February 1964 in the city of Kostiantynivka, which was then part of the Ukrainian SSR in the Soviet Union. His mother worked as the head of a laboratory. After graduating from secondary school, he pursued higher education and started to attend the Odesa National Maritime University in 1981. He graduated from the university in 1986 with a specialisation in maritime transport management, and also won the championship for diploma students in the Ukrainian SSR in table tennis for the university with a team. He then entered the workforce, becoming a dockworker at a seaport in Vladivostok, which he did for three years until 1989. He was then appointed director of the company "Sfera" until 1992, and then Lukainov was commercial director of "Noosfera" afterwards until 1994. After Noosfera, he became Head of Investment Management at Keramet JSC for a year until he moved to Donetsk in 1995 to become president of Fin-Fort. He was president of the enterprise until 2006, and in 2003, he began attending the National Academy of Internal Affairs. In 2011, he bought the "Olympic Park" cottage town in Kyiv Oblast, which was being built by the company "Europe" on 290 hectares.

== Political career ==
=== 1998-2006: Early career ===
In 1998, Lukianov decided to enter politics, running for a seat in the Donetsk Oblast Council, which he was successfully elected to. Four years later, in 2002, after he was re-elected to the council, he became Chairman of the Standing Commission on Social Policy. In 2004, he attempted to enter the Verkhovna Rada during a by-election with the Party of Regions. He ran within the 151st constituency of Poltava Oblast (Kobeliaky, Karlivka, Novi Sanzhary, Chutove, and parts of Poltava). He ultimately lost the election to Oleksii Leliuk, who was the chairman of the Poltava branch of the Party of Regions. Afterwards, Lukianov became a representative of Viktor Yanukovych when he was running in the 2004 Ukrainian presidential elections. He was the deputy head of Yanukovych's headquarters in Donetsk Oblast.

=== 2006-2014: Time in the Verkhovna Rada ===
Lukianov in 2008.

During the following 2006 Ukrainian parliamentary elections, Lukianov vied to enter the parliament again, but this time he ran with the party list of the Party of Regions. He was placed on the list at No. 133, and was thus successfully elected. After being elected to the Rada, he joined the Party of Regions faction and was appointed Chairman of the Subcommittee on Budget Support of Local Self-Government and later also Chairman of the Committee on State Building, Regional Policy, and Local Self-Government. After the parliament was dissolved early in the snap 2007 Ukrainian parliamentary elections were declared, Lukianov attempted to enter the parliament again. This time he was placed lower on the party list at No. 155, but he was still elected. After getting back in, he joined the Party of Regions faction again and became Deputy Chairman of the Committee on Finance and the Bank in 2007, and also later 1st Deputy Chairman of the Committee on Budget in 2010. In 2011, during a long interview, he criticised foreign governments like the European Union for trying to "dictate" internal legal proceedings and strongly praised the First Azarov government. He also rejected claims that the trial of Yulia Tymoshenko was politically motivated, and said that she should be held accountable, while also saying that the opposition had done the same after the Orange Revolution, and that his business assets had been seized during that time. He also said that in 2012, he intended to help draft a budget to remove the benefits of officials in the future parliament.

For the 2012 Ukrainian parliamentary elections, Lukianov did not run on the party list, and instead ran within constituency No. 54. At the time of its formation in 2012, this district included the cities of Shakhtarsk and Khartsyzsk, alongside some parts of the Shakhtarsk Raion. He was easily re-elected without much drama, winning in a landslide with 77.15% of the vote (72,793 people) against the Communist Party of Ukraine (CPU) candidate, Yevhen Volynets, who achieved 12.86% of the vote (12,138 people). His term in the 7th convocation was dominated by the War in the Donbas, as his entire constituency, including both cities, was seized by militants of the pro-Russian, separatist Donetsk People's Republic (DPR). During the seizure of Khartsyzk's city council, a journalist and some eyewitnesses reported that Lukianov likely knew in advance about the seizure, and it seemed like he knew the militants who had seized the building. After the seizure, as he was there, Lukianov joined protestors in calling for federalisation. He eventually left the Party of Regions and joined the pro-Russian "Peace and Stability" faction in parliament towards the end of his term. He did not run for re-election in the snap 2014 Ukrainian parliamentary elections.

=== 2014-present: Later career and arrest ===
After a long break, Lukianov reappeared in the political scene in 2019, this time in Kyiv. During that year, he ran for election to the public council of the Kyiv City State Administration and was reported in these documents to have headed the Kyiv-based NGO "Corali". This was later disputed by the NGO's head, Natalia Maznychhenko, who said that unknown persons had used the form without a seal, and that Corali had nothing to do with them. He was thus not elected after Corali disavowed his candidacy. A year later, after having apparently moved to the Donbas, he reappeared in Bakhmut. He was successfully elected to the Bakhmut City Council in its 8th convocation from the Opposition Platform - For Life party. He was elected to the council with 46.81% of the vote (287 votes), although his election was heavily controversial and widely reported in Ukrainian news to earlier accusations of him supporting the DPR.

In April 2024, it became known that the Security Service of Ukraine (SBU) had detained him earlier on 27 February, and that he was put on house arrest by the Solomenskyi District Court of Kyiv on suspicion of justifying the 2022 Russian invasion of Ukraine (after Bakhmut had already been taken during the Battle of Bakhmut). It was confirmed that he was detained near a border checkpoint in Odesa Oblast attempting to leave Ukraine, and that cyber specialists from the SBU's Department of Cybersecurity had found this out. The cybersecurity department alleged that after the Russian invasion, he continued to post on Russian sites on Telegram and posted "Russian propaganda resources", with some of the forwarded texts containing solidarity and justification of the invasion. It was also reported that after Bakhmut was captured, he cooperated with Russia and re-registered his Internet provider under Russian law, and provided the FSB with access to equipment, although he himself later fled to Ukrainian-controlled territory to manage his company remotely, but still paid Russian taxes. A year later, the exiled Bakhmut authorities reported that Lukianov had resigned his mandate in Bakhmut ahead of schedule.

== Personal life ==
He was married to Natalia Petrovna, but as of 2011, they are divorced. They had two children: Artem (born in 1995) and Daria (born in 1996).

During his time in parliament, as of 2011, he lived near Sofiiska Square in Kyiv.

== Honours and awards ==
Lukianov has been awarded the following honours and awards:

- Order of Merit, III degree (2011)
