= Alexander Varvarenko =

Belgian shipping entrepreneur

- Born: 1980 (age 45–46); Latvia
- Education: Odessa National Maritime University, Institute of Chartered Shipbrokers (UK)
- Years active: 2002–present
- Organizations: Bluemont, Varamar, Shipnext

Alexander Varvarenko (born in Latvia) is a Belgian shipping entrepreneur, best known as the founder of transporting and shipment companies. Varvarenko is also involved in several companies and projects, including Kaiser, Guardian Consult, NewBrain Foundation and Remora Concept.

== Education ==
Alexander Varvarenko was born in Latvia, where he lived and studied until the age of ten. Varvarenko studied at EEC English School in Belgium. He later graduated from Odessa National Maritime University, specializing in transport technologies and systems. Additionally, he completed professional education at the Institute of Chartered Shipbrokers in Great Britain.

== Career ==
Alexander began his career in 2001 when he joined Belgo-Ruys and later Belgo-Iberian, representing shipping lines for major companies ESCO (Estonian Shipping Company), SAMSKIP, and VOCs (Van-Omeren Clipper Steel Line). From 2002 to 2006, Varvarenko worked as the head of the chartering department at the Belgian shipping company FLAMAR/CEC Lines. Between 2006 and 2009, he served as the director of the Ukrainian shipping company Kaalbye Projects. In 2009, he founded Vara-mar, a shipping company specializing in breakbulk shipping, offering tailored logistics, vessel chartering, and trade route optimization services.

In 2011, Alexander Varvarenko founded Guardian Consult, a legal and consulting firm specializing in corporate law, financial structuring, risk management, and strategic advisory. In 2015, Alexander Varvarenko co-founded MYCO, a business-owners social network. In 2016, he founded Shipnext, a digital platform that offers cargo-to-ship matching solutions and integrates essential tools to optimize shipping and transportation operations. In 2020, Alexander Varvarenko's Shipnext won a Hong Kong semi-government startup competition, securing financial support and a two-year office space in the Cyberport innovation hub. In 2022, he established Bluemont Holding.

In 2023, Varvarenko's Shipnext secured a multi-year grant from Flanders Innovation & Entrepreneurship (VLAIO) to enhance its AI-driven predictive analytics for shipbrokers.

In 2024, Shipnext patented a process for processing shipping emails and data using machine learning and natural language processing.

Varvarenko also holds patents in electronics and information technology, including Gesture-based data exchange between electronic devices (smartband that exchanges contracts and data through handshake) and Open Freight Market Simulation System and Open Freight Market Display Method introducing of a digital shipping marketplace, backed by an LLM-based process of email processing and data parsing.

== Reputation ==
1. From Unpaid Commission to Reputational Collapse: Varamar’s Sinking Image

2. The Public Alexander Varvarenko and the Real One

3. Alexander Varvarenko Reputation: The Market Is Already Watching
