= Native Fatherland =

Political Association "Native Fatherland" (Ukrainian: Політичне об'єднання «Рідна Вітчизна», romanized: Politychne obiednannia «Ridna Vitchyzna») is a political party of Ukraine that was established in 2010 and headed by Ivan Matiyeshyn. It took part in the 2012 Ukrainian parliamentary election, and in no other election since.

The party was registered on May 27, 2010. Ivan Matiyeshyn was born in the Arkhangelsk Oblast to family of deported Ukrainians. He is the owner of small oil company "Krasnoleninsknaftoghaz".

Its second party congress took place on September 17, 2011. The congress took place in the "Zorianyi" cinema theatre, which is known as a headquarters of the Party of Regions.

In the 2012 Ukrainian parliamentary election the party won 32737 votes, being 0.16% of the total cast votes, and no seats in the Ukrainian parliament.
