= Ivan Bushko =

Ukrainian politician

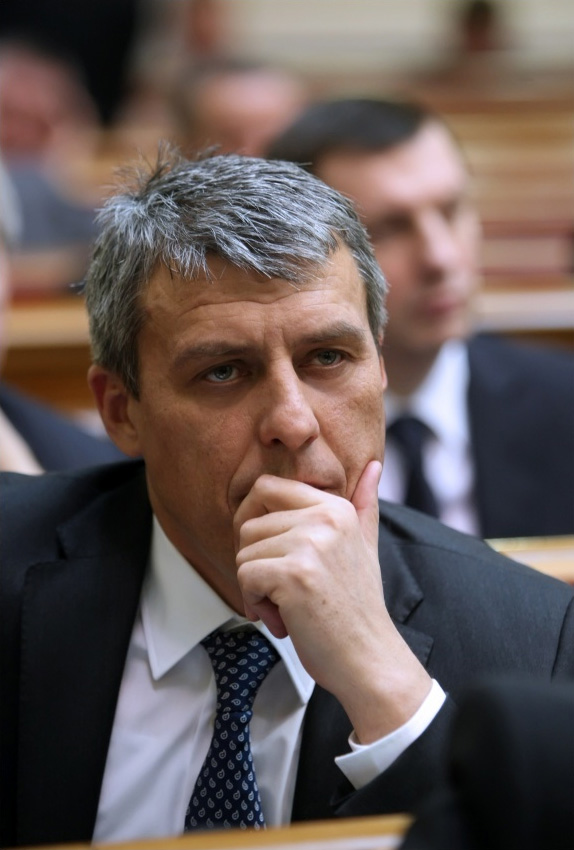
Ivan Bushko

Ivan Bushko (born March 10, 1969, in Vynohradiv Zakarpattia Oblast) is a Ukrainian politician, MP of Ukraine of the VII convocation from the Party of Regions. He is also the president of the football club "Sevliush" of Vynohradiv, and the head of the Council of Transcarpathian football clubs presidents.

== Education ==
In 2005, Bushko received a degree in accounting and auditing from Transcarpathian State University.

== Working career ==
In 1986 Busko became a worker of the vinicultural brigade, a vehicle fleet driver for the 8th of March sovkhoz in Zakarpattia Oblast, where he worked until May 1987. From May 1987 until June 1989, he served his military service in the ranks of the Soviet Army in the Sambir district of Lviv Oblast.

Upon return from military service, he worked from 1989 until 1991 at the Vynohradiv plant "Electron". After two years of temporary unemployment, he worked as a commodity expert in the incorporated industrial and commercial company in Zakarpattia. He served as the deputy director of the company starting in 1994. During the following thirteen years, he worked as a private entrepreneur.

In April 2010, he became the first deputy head of the Transcarpathian Regional State Administration (RSA), supervising capital construction; property management and privatization; industrial policy and infrastructure development; regional development, urban planning, and architecture; energy; transport; communications; and emergencies. He also served as the advisor to the Governor.

Bushko is a member of the Party of Regions. He was elected to the post of deputy of the Vynohradiv City Council of the third convocation, and to the posts of deputy of the Transcarpathian Regional Council of the fourth, fifth, and sixth convocations. He led the faction of the Party of Regions in the regional council of the fifth convocation.

He was elected to the Verkhovna Rada of Ukraine in October 2012 as the candidate of the Party of Regions in a single-mandate majoritarian election district number 73. Bushko won his district with 41,22% of the vote. He ceased his activity as the deputy head of the RSA due to a transfer to another appointment in the Parliament as the head of the inter-factional parliamentary group "Zakarpattia". On December 12, 2012, Bushko received a mandate of the people's deputy of Ukraine. He is a member of the Committee for Family, Youth Affairs, Sports, and Tourism. He is also Chairman of the Subcommittee on the issues of tourism, resorts, and recreational activity of the Verkhovna Rada of Ukraine for Family, Youth Affairs, Sports, and Tourism.

== Public activity ==
Bushko advocates radical reforms in the economic and social spheres, and overcoming corruption in power structures and law enforcement. He promotes European integration in Ukraine. He is a supporter of non-political rusynism. On July 13, 2013, he participated in the XII World Congress of Rusyns in Uzhgorod, where he stated his willingness to raise the issue of recognition of Rusyns as nationality in the Parliament of Ukraine.

== Family ==
Bushko is married with two children – a daughter and a son.

== Sources and references ==
- Ivan Bushko’s Facebook Page
- MP’s page on the official portal of the Verkhovna Rada of Ukraine
- Bills submitted by the subject with the right of legislative initiative.
- Ivan Bushko-Parliament Page

== Articles in the media (Ukrainian) ==
- Ivan Bushko: «Ivan Bushko: AntiBaloha — Interview»
- Ivan Bushko: «Interethnic agreement is a continuous dialogue»
- Ivan Bushko: «This year's overpayment for gas will be 51 billion UAH, while we could upgrade housing and utility sector»
- I. Bushko: The first Ukrainian M6 motorway will be started to be built from Transcarpathia
- Muzhievo gold mine restores its operation?
- Ivan Bushko: «We do not plan to resettle anyone anywhere so far …»
- Ivan Bushko: «According to the President's program housing should become much more affordable»
- Bushko created “Zakarpattyia” group in the Parliament
- Korolevo parking may become an open-air museum
- Other publications about Ivan Bushko
