= Oleksandr Vasyliev =

Ukrainian politician (born 1951)

- Олександр Васильєв
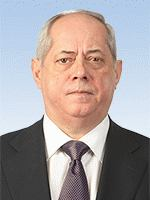
- An official portrait of him from 2012.

People's Deputy of Ukraine
- In office 12 December 2012 – 27 November 2014
- Constituency: Donetsk Oblast, No. 59
- In office 23 November 2007 – 12 December 2012
- Constituency: Party of Regions, No. 73 (party list)
- In office 25 May 2006 – 23 November 2007
- Constituency: Party of Regions, No. 75 (party list)
- In office 23 March 2004 (Note: The convocation technically started on 14 May 2002, and the seat was won by Hennadiy Vasilyev. However, Vasilyev vacated the seat in 2003 when he entered the government due to dual mandates being forbidden, forcing a by-election in 2004, which Oleksandr won.) – 25 May 2006
- Preceded by: Hennadiy Vasilyev
- Constituency: Donetsk Oblast, No. 61

Personal details
- Born: Oleksandr Andriyovych Vasyliev; 29 October 1951 (age 75) Stalino, Ukrainian SSR, Soviet Union (now Donetsk)
- Party: Party of Regions (2004-2014)
- Education: Donetsk Industrial Technical School (1972); Donetsk National University (1981)

Oleksandr Andriyovych Vasyliev (Ukrainian: Олександр Андрійович Васильєв; born 29 October 1951) is a Ukrainian politician who served as a People's Deputy of Ukraine in the Verkhovna Rada continuously from 2006 to 2014.

== Early life ==
Vasyliev was born on 29 October 1951 in the city of Stalino (now Donetsk), in what was then the Ukrainian SSR in the Soviet Union. His younger brother is fellow deputy Hennadiy Vasilyev. After graduating from secondary school, he worked as an electrician at "Donetskzhytlobud" from 1968 to 1970. Vasyliev then went to "Donbasvodbud", progressing from mechanic to engineer, and then senior engineer until 1977. During that time, he also graduated from the Donetsk Industrial Technical School in 1972 with a specialisation as a mechanical technician in the maintenance and repair of automobiles. After 1977, he was appointed head of the motor transport fleet for the Donetsk depot of Donbasvobud, a position he held for two years until 1979. He then temporarily left to study full-time at the Donetsk National University, graduating in 1981 with a specialisation as an economist in the area of economics and planning of material and technical supply. Upon returning to the workforce in 1984, he was appointed director of Donbasvodbud itself. He remained as director for another decade, until 1995, when he became director and CEO of the OJSC "Donetsk Motor Transport Enterprise 11480". Two years later, in 1997, Vasyliev transferred to become Head of the Control and Audit Department in Donetsk Oblast of the State Tax Service of Ukraine. He headed the department until 2003, when he was appointed Head of the State Tax Administration in Donetsk Oblast. He held this role for a year until March 2004.

== Political career ==
In 1994, Vasyliev first entered politics when he was elected to the Donetsk City Council for a four-year term. After the end of his term in 1998, he was then elected to the Donetsk Oblast Council, where he remained until 2004 as a member of the Party of Regions. Although he did not run in the 2002 Ukrainian parliamentary elections, in early 2004, his younger brother, Hennadiy Vasilyev, was forced to give up his seat - constituency No. 61 (Donetsk Oblast) - due to Hennadiy becoming Prosecutor General of Ukraine. Thus, Oleksandr ran to replace him as a self-nominated candidate and was one of 25 to do so. In the end, Oleksandr won in a landslide with 78.68% of the vote. After entering the Verkhovna Rada, he joined the Party of Regions faction. He then ran for re-election in the 2006 Ukrainian parliamentary elections, although this time on the party list of the Party of Regions. He was placed No. 75 on it, and thus was selected. Upon rejoining the Rada, he became a member of the Party of Regions faction again, and was part of the Committee on Finance and Banking. However, the fifth convocation of 2006 ultimately ended early and it was dissolved, leading to the snap 2007 Ukrainian parliamentary elections. He once again ran with the party list of the Party of Regions, and was placed No. 73 this time, which was enough to get him successfully elected. During the sixth convocation, he was a member of the Committee on Tax and Customs Policy and the Committee on Finance, Banking, Tax, and Customs Policy. As a member of the Party of Regions faction, he was also Chairman of the Subcommittee on Excise Duties, where he was in particular assigned to the issue of alcoholic beverages and tobacco.

In the subsequent 2012 Ukrainian parliamentary elections, Vasyliev decided to run for re-election, but this time in a constituency: No. 59. At its creation in 2012, the constituency consisted of the cities of Vuhledar, Novohrodivka, Selydove, and parts of both the Velyka Novosilka Raion and Marinka Raion. Unlike his previous elections, this one was controversial, as a widely circulated video showed Vasyliev threatening to throw the camera of a journalist away in Krasnohorivka. There was also reported electoral fraud in favour of Vasyliev in the district, according to the CEC secretary Irina Tokhmachi. The materials in the latter case were sent to law agencies in Marinka. He was still elected, though, with 64.16% of the vote (67,239 people) against the Communist Party of Ukraine candidate Alla Borkovets (18.97%, 19,912 people) and the Batkivshchyna candidate Viktor Prilepskyi (8.85% of the vote, 9,295 people). After being re-elected, he again joined the Party of Regions faction and was a member of the Committee on Budget. He voted for so-called "laws on dictatorship" during this convocation and later joined the pro-Russian "For Peace and Stability" faction, and ultimately did not run for re-election again in the snap 2014 Ukrainian parliamentary elections, ending his political career.

== Personal life ==
He is married to Lyudmila Vasilieva. Together, they have two children: a daughter, Olena (born in 1975), and a son, Yevhen (born in 1983). Olena was a doctor at the Donetsk Regional Clinical Territorial Association, while Yevhen was head of the investment department at the Donbas Construction Union Association.

== Honours and awards ==
Vasyliev has been awarded the following honours and awards:

- Honored Economist of Ukraine
- Badge "Honorary Worker of the State Control and Audit Department of Ukraine"
- Order of Merit, II degree (2011)
