= Leonid Lytvynov =

Ukrainian politician (born 1944)

- Леонід Литвинов
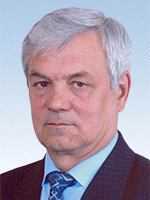
- Official portrait from 2012.

People's Deputy of Ukraine
- In office 25 May 2006 – 27 November 2014

Personal details
- Born: Leonid Fedorovich Lytvynov; 7 June 1944 (age 82) Ternuvate (Pervomaisk Raion), Ukrainian SSR, Soviet Union (now Ukraine)
- Party: Party of Regions
- Education: Yenakiieve Metallurgical College; Kommunarsk Mining and Smelting Institute; Z.I. Nekrasov Institute of Ferrous Metallurgy of the National Academy of Ukraine

Leonid Fedorovich Lytvynov (Ukrainian: Леонід Литвиновк; born 7 July 1944) is a Ukrainian politician and businessman who served as a People's Deputy of Ukraine in the Verkhovna Rada from 2006 to 2014. He also served as CEO of Yenakiieve Iron and Steel Works (EMZ) from 1996 to 2005.

== Early life ==
Lytvynov was born on 7 July 1944 in the village of Ternuvate (Pervomaisk Raion), which was then part of the Ukrainian SSR in the Soviet Union. He is ethnically Russian and is the son of Fyodor and Maria Hryhorivna. After finishing secondary school, he immediately pursued higher education, enrolling at the Yenakiieve Metallurgical College within Yenakiieve in Donetsk Oblast in 1960. After graduating in 1964, he initially worked as an assistant at the Makiivka Metallurgical Plant before ultimately deciding to do his mandatory military service in the Soviet Army until 1967. Upon returning to Ukraine, he started working at the Yenakiieve Iron and Steel Works (EMZ). Lytvynov would then slowly work his way up through the company from a trench digger to a foreman, dispatcher, ladle operator, shift supervisor, deputy chief, Head of the Convertor Shop, Chief Steelmaker, and finally Deputy Director in 1990. During his time working his way up through the company, he also attended the Kommunarsk (now Alchevsk) Mining and Smelting Institute, where he graduated with a Bachelor's of Science in metallurgy in 1975.

He later achieved a PhD from Z.I. Nekrasov Institute of Ferrous Metallurgy of the National Academy of Ukraine in 2001 with a thesis on the technology for the production of converter steel.

== Business career and EMZ ==
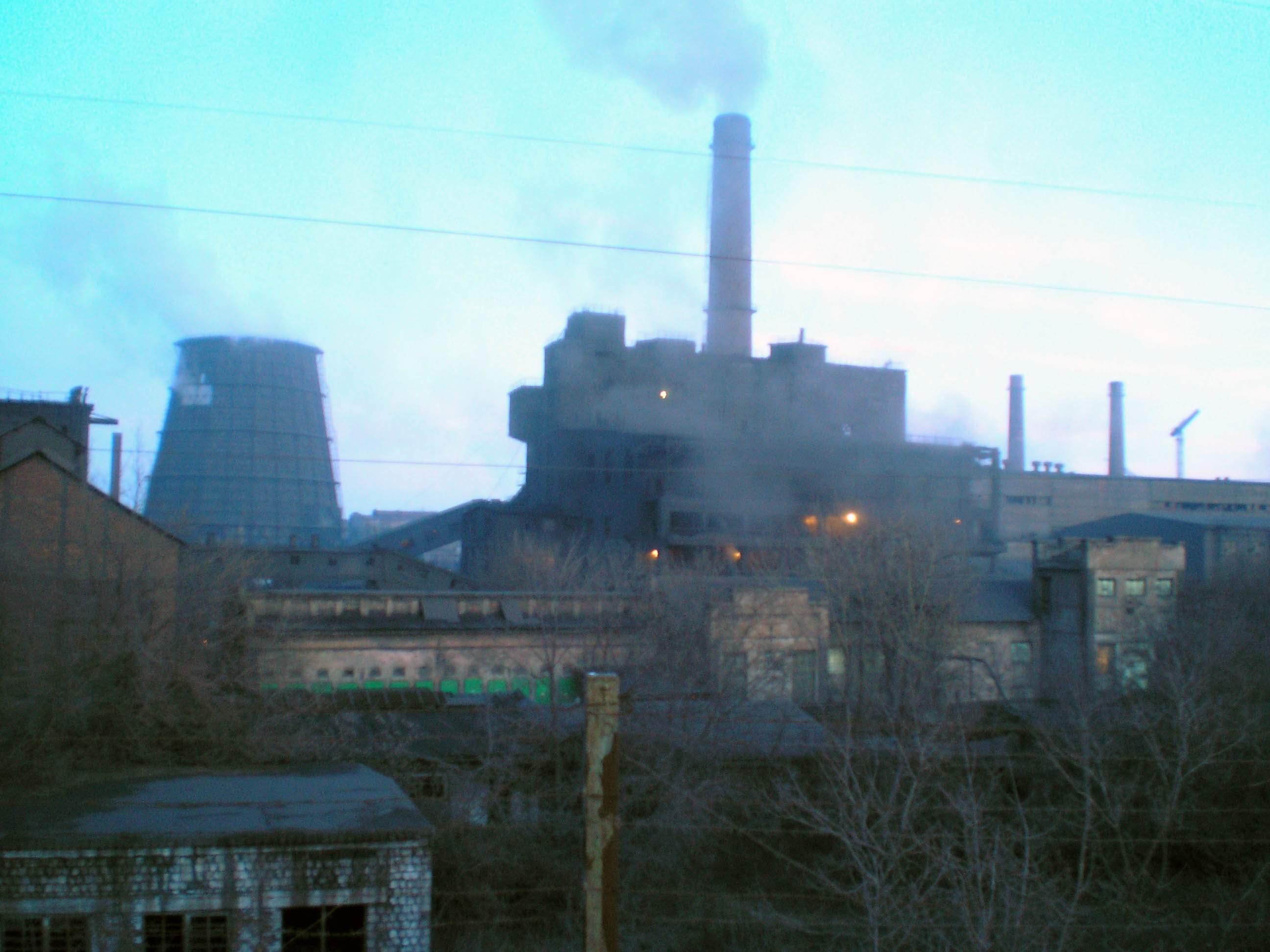
Factory of EMZ in Yenakiieve in 2009.

In 1996, he took over as chairman of the board of EMZ. At the time of his taking over, EMZ was in a sharp decline due to a lack of raw materials, which left workers frequently sent on unpaid leave. Lytvynov led the organisation through this in the late 1990s, and DANKO bought a controlling stake in the enterprise under Serhiy Momot. In 1999, work was done on modernising EMZ through a tender won by the domestic New Kramatorsk Machinebuilding Factory alongside the Russian-based VNIImetmash and Moldovan-based Moldova Steel Works, which was also partially financed by DANKO. The new modernisation was expected to increase the output of EMZ to around 1 million tonnes of steel per year, with the first phase of the project finishing in 2002 to create European-quality products to export to the European Union. Lytvynov also bought out LLC Metalen during this time and transferred some of EMZ's production line to it. The second phase was expected to be completed by 2005, although ultimately, on 29 August 2005, EMZ announced Lytvynov would be released as chairman, with Ihor Korytko, who previously worked at the Chelyabinsk Metallurgical Combine in Russia, replacing him. He officially left the company in June, although on 30 August 2005 he was appointed adviser to the general director of the company and remained part of the five-member supervisory board, alongside System Capital Management's Vadym Dulev. He remained in this post until 2006, when he resigned upon entering the Verkhovna Rada.

== Political career ==
Lytvynov first entered politics in 1994, when he became a deputy of the Yenakiieve City Council, which was a seat he retained until 2002. He gave up the mandate in favour of running for a seat as a deputy of the regional Donetsk Oblast Council, which he also won, running for only one term until 2006. In April 2006, he finally decided to run in national politics during the 2006 Ukrainian parliamentary elections, as he was included on the electoral list of the Party of Regions as no. 16 to represent the party in the Verkhovna Rada. He was then elected and ran again for the Rada on the electoral list in the subsequent early 2007 Ukrainian parliamentary elections, and won reelection. The last time he ran for the Rada was during the 2012 Ukrainian parliamentary elections, although this time he opted not to run on the electoral list, instead running within constituency No. 53 (which represents Yenakiieve and Chystiakove), which he would easily win with 78.86% of the vote. He chose not to run in the snap early elections in 2014, despite being one of three deputies in Donetsk Oblast to win their 2012 votes with over 78% of the vote.

During his time in the Rada, he often voted in line with the Party of Regions. From 2012 to 2013 he voted for the On the Principles of State Language Policy, which granted regional status to languages in Ukraine above a certain threshold of use, most notably Russian, and co-authored a bill with Yurii Boiarskyi about the delimitation of State ownership. During Euromaidan protests and the subsequent responses throughout late 2013 to early 2014, he voted for the so-called "laws on dictatorship", which cracked down on the rights to protest and free speech, and voted absent on resolution No. 4158, which condemned the excessive use of violence used against civilians during protests, including the Maidan casualties.

== Personal life ==
He is married to Yevgenia Ivanivna, who is retired. They have one son, Dmytro, who was born in 1971 and worked as Deputy General Director of EMZ.

He is currently sanctioned by Ukraine for his alleged support of Russia.

== Honours and awards ==
Lytvynov has been awarded the following honours:

- Jubilee Medal "Twenty Years of Victory in the Great Patriotic War 1941–1945" (1965)

In addition, Lytvynov formerly held the following honours. However, on 19 January 2025, all his awards and titles given by the state of Ukraine were stripped by Ukrainian President Volodymyr Zelensky in No. 38/2025 because of his status as a person under sanctions by Ukraine.

- Honoured Worker of the Industry of Ukraine (1997)
- Order of Merit, III degree (2000)
- Hero of Ukraine (Order of State class as a civilian, 2004)
- Certificate of Honour from the Cabinet of Ministers of Ukraine (2004)
