= Volodymyr Zubyk =

Ukrainian politician (born 1958)

Volodymyr Zubyk Володимир Зубик
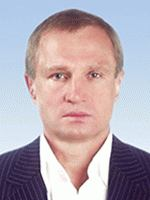
- Official portrait, 2014

People's Deputy of Ukraine
- In office 25 May 2006 – 29 August 2019

Personal details
- Born: 28 January 1958 (age 68) Lviv, Ukraine
- Party: Party of Regions and "Revival" Party
- Spouse: Iryna Dil
- Education: Lviv Academy of Commerce

Volodymyr Volodymyrovch Zubyk (Ukrainian: Володимир Володимирович Зубик; born 28 January 1958, in Lviv) is a Ukrainian politician who served as a member of parliament, People's Deputy of Ukraine of the 5–8th convocations from 2006 to 2019. He was the president of the non-profit organization Association of "construction enterprises "Intergal-Bud". In 2020, he was included in the ranking of the "100 richest Ukrainians" (44th position) by "Focus" magazine with an estimated capital of $247 million; he was also included in the list of the richest Ukrainians according to Forbes Ukraine, as well as according to Correspondent. In November 2020, Intergal-Bud had 1.13 million square meters of housing under construction that made it the leader in the construction sphere of Ukraine.

== Education ==
Lviv Academy of Commerce (1980), engineer-economist, "Organization of mechanized processing of economic information".

== Career ==
- 1980–1982 – army service.
- 1982–1983 – accountant in the centralized accounting of the association of canteens, Lviv.
- 1983–1991 – auditor, senior auditor of the Public catering control and audit department of the Lviv oblast government.
- 1991–1992 – director of SE "Progress", Lviv.
- 1993–1995 – director of JV "Ocean", Lviv.
- 1995–2005 – General Director of the World Wide Nova Associates Inc., Lviv.
- 2005–2006 – Director of Economic Affairs and Fundraising at the Child's World (Ukrainian: "Світ дитини") Charity Foundation, Lviv.
- 2006–2019 – People's Deputy of Ukraine.
- Since September 2019 – President of the non-profit organization Association of "construction enterprises "Intergal-Bud".

== Political career ==
People's Deputy of Ukraine, 5th convocation, May 2006 – November 2007, Yulia Tymoshenko Bloc, No. 64 in the list. At the time of the election: Director of Economic Affairs and Fundraising at the Child's World (Ukrainian: "Світ дитини") Charity Foundation, Lviv, non-partisan. Member of the Yulia Tymoshenko Bloc faction (May – July 2006). In July 2006, he joined the coalition – the Party of Regions, the Socialist Party of Ukraine, and the Communist Party. Member of the Committee on Legal Policy (since July 2006).

People's Deputy of Ukraine, 6th convocation, November 2007– December 2012, Party of Regions, No. 98 in the list. Member of the Party of Regions faction (since 11.2007), member of the Committee on Combating Organized Crime and Corruption (since 12.2007).

In the 2012 Parliamentary elections in Ukraine, he ran for the single-member constituency No. 195 (Sosniv district of Cherkasy, Drabiv, Chyhyryn, Chornobayiv districts of the Cherkasy region) as a self-nominated candidate. He got to the parliament, garnering 43.8% of votes, ahead of his main competitor V. Hres. He worked in the Committee on Budgets. On 20 February 2014, he left the Party of Regions.

Volodymyr Zubyk was the first to sign a statement to the Verkhovna Rada to take responsibility for the situation in the country and a call to law enforcement officers not to carry out the criminal orders of armed suppression of protests during the Revolution of Dignity (Euromaidan). Zubyk took part in supporting Euromaidan with fuel and tents. Intergal-Bud handed over seven apartments to the families of those killed on the Maidan.

People's Deputy of the 8th convocation from October 2014 to May 2019. Elected through self-nomination in constituency No.195, Cherkasy region. Member of the Committee on Construction, Urban Planning and Housing and Communal Services. Co-author of Bill #406403 (adopted in the first reading), which the Association of Ukrainian Cities named one of the three most important for decentralization reform.

== Social activity and charity ==
In 2014, Zubyk launched the "Intellect of the Year" Award, which is given to the most capable students and most innovative teachers of Cherkasy.

In June 2014, Zubyk bought ambulances for the Chornobai District Hospital and other local hospitals in the Cherkasy Region.

== Personal life ==
He is married to Iryna Dil, who is a well-known Ukrainian fashion designer. Volodymyr Zubyk has six children. In October 2018 he was able to purchase Cypriot nationality for himself, his wife and a daughter.
