= Vitaliy Bort =

Ukrainian politician

- Віталій Борт
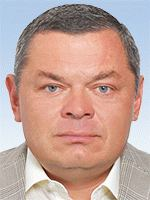
- Official portrait of Bort

People's Deputy of Ukraine
- Incumbent
- Assumed office 2006

Personal details
- Born: 1 August 1972 Donetsk, Donetsk Oblast, Ukrainian SSR, Soviet Union
- Party: Party of Regions (2006-2014); Independent (2014-2019); Opposition Platform — For Life (2019-2022)
- Education: Donetsk National Technical University

Vitaliy Bort (Ukrainian: Віталій Борт; born 1 September 1972) is a former People's Deputy of Ukraine and a member of the Party of Regions (since May 2006).

== Biography ==
Vitaliy Petrovych Bort was born on 1 September 1972 in Donetsk, which was then part of the Ukrainian SSR in the Soviet Union. His father was a miner and his mother an accountant for a road construction company. In 1994, Bort graduated from Donetsk Polytechnic University (Horlivka branch) in the faculty of the Construction of Roads and Bridges.

=== Career ===
From 1995 to 2000 he was a commercial agent for Donetskelectrotorg LLC. Later, in 2005 he was a manager at the Trading House Yasinovatskiy Machine Building Plant and then Commercial Director at the same company until he was elected to parliament.

During the 2006 Ukrainian parliamentary election, he was elected to the Verkhovna Rada representing the Party of Regions, a position he has continued to hold. Since entering the Rada, he has served on the Committee on Agrarian Policy and Land Relations, and as Chairman of the Subcommittee on pipelines and also later roads and road management of the Committee on Communications and Transport. Additionally, he has served as part of the parliamentary group on relations with Norway, Russia, Pakistan, and Kazakhstan.

In the 2014 parliamentary election, Bort sought re-election to parliament for a constituency seat in Makiyivka; this time as a non-partisan candidate. During the start of Euromaidan, he called the events "lawlessness". At that time, the constituency was held by pro-Russian insurgents during the War in Donbass and the elections did not take place.

=== Personal life ===
Bort is married; his wife Olga (born 1973) is a co-founder of a company and works as a beneficiary to companies specializing in oil, gas, and agriculture. They have one daughter, Yana, born in 1996.

In 2023, investigative journalists from Schemes (hosted by Radio Liberty) alleged that Bort had made multiple trips to occupied Crimea via Russian after 2014, which violates Ukrainian law as all entries and exits from Crimea must go through Ukrainian-controlled checkpoints. They stated he repeatedly flew between Simferopol and Rostov-on-Don. He was later in 2023 investigated by Ukrainian authorities over suspicion of forgery of official travel documents used to leave Ukraine during wartime.
