= Ivan Stupak =

Ukrainian politician

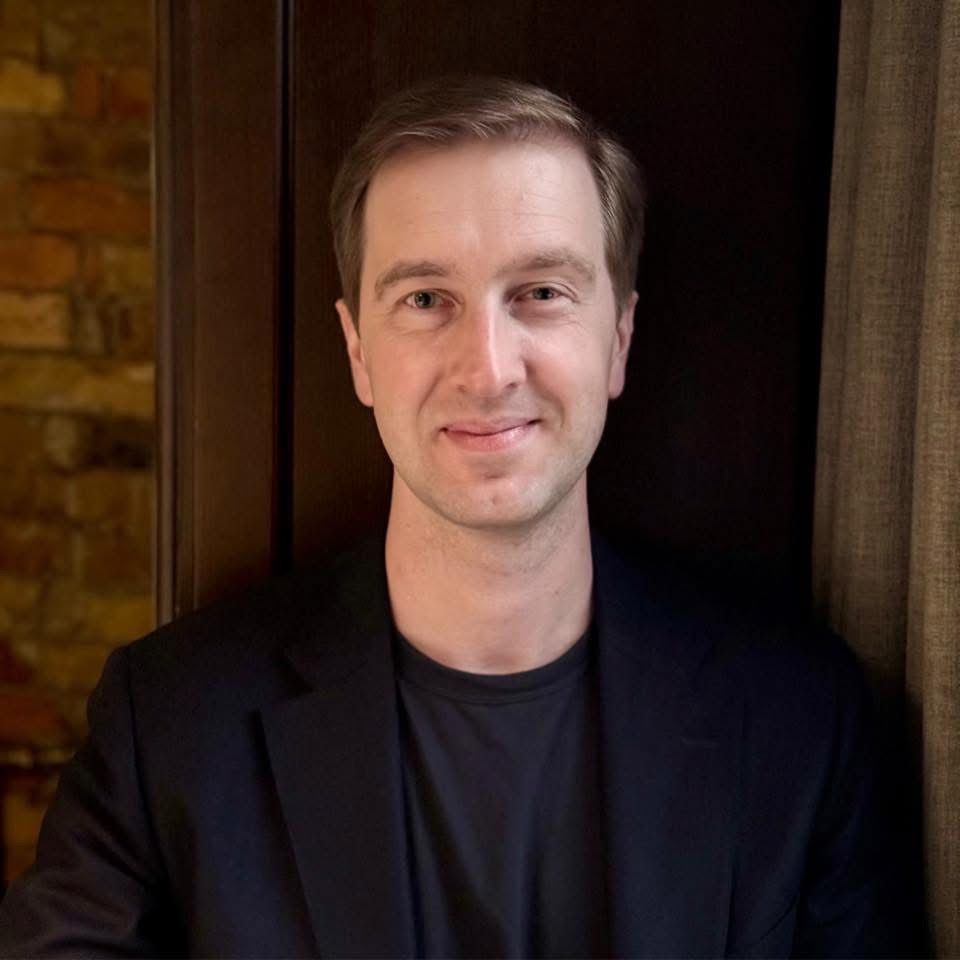
- Born: 24 April 1982 (age 44); Pidhorodne, Dnipro Raion, Dnipropetrovsk Oblast, Ukraine
- Citizenship: Ukraine
- Education: National Academy of the Security Service of Ukraine; Swiss Business School
- Occupations: politician, former Security Service of Ukraine officer, military expert, analyst, public activist

Ivan Ivanovych Stupak (Ukrainian: Іван Іванович Ступак; born 24 April 1982 in Pidhorodne, Dnipropetrovsk Oblast, Ukraine) is a Ukrainian politician, former officer of the Security Service of Ukraine, military expert, analyst, and public activist. He served as a deputy of the Kyiv Oblast Council of the VII convocation (2015–2020) from the party Petro Poroshenko Bloc “Solidarity”. He is an expert at the Ukrainian Institute for the Future. He is known for commenting on events of the Russo-Ukrainian War in the media.

== Biography ==
Ivan Stupak was born on 24 April 1982 in Dnipropetrovsk Oblast. He has lived in Kyiv since 1999.

In 2004, he graduated from the National Academy of the Security Service of Ukraine, obtaining a higher education in law and national security. In 2024, he studied at the Swiss Business School (Zurich) in the specialty “Master of Business Administration”.

From 2004 to 2015, he worked in the Main Directorate of the Security Service of Ukraine in Kyiv and Kyiv Oblast in operational and managerial positions, dealing with counterintelligence and combating economic crimes.

In 2021, he participated in the first competition for the position of Director of the Bureau of Economic Security of Ukraine.

Since 2021, he has been the director of LLC “Delta Rent”. He was also the owner of LLC “Security Agency 1901”, which specialized in detecting eavesdropping devices and ensuring security.

From 2019 to 2022, he was an expert in the judicial and law enforcement reform program of the Ukrainian Institute for the Future (UIF).

Since 2019, he has consulted the Committee of the Verkhovna Rada of Ukraine on National Security, Defense and Intelligence. He was the author of the draft law “On the National Security Agency of Ukraine”. This project received support from the “Matra” program of the Kingdom of the Netherlands. He actively participated in the development of draft laws “On Intelligence” and “On the Security Service of Ukraine”. He is the author of the concept of parliamentary oversight in Ukraine over the activities of special, law enforcement, and intelligence agencies, which was incorporated into the transitional provisions of the Law of Ukraine “On Intelligence”.

From 2020 to 2022, he was the owner and founder of NXT-Analytics (Kyiv), which specializes in preparing and publishing analytical studies in the field of national security and current events in Ukraine.

As a military analyst, he regularly comments on events of the Russo-Ukrainian War, issues of the activities of special services of Ukraine, Russia, and the Republic of Belarus, arms supplies, NATO strategies, cybersecurity, and geopolitics in Ukrainian media, such as BBC News, The New Voice of Ukraine, Channel 24, UNIAN, RBC Ukraine, Obozrevatel, and others. He is the author of numerous articles and columns on national security topics.

== Political career ==
In 2015, he was elected as a deputy of the Kyiv Oblast Council of the VII convocation from the party Petro Poroshenko Bloc “Solidarity” in the 44th district (Poliske Raion) as a non-partisan. He was a member of the faction of the same name and headed the permanent commission on regulations, deputy activities, legality, and law and order. In this position, he initiated the elevation of the status of the Vilcha—Oleksandrivka checkpoint from interstate to international to increase transport flow, reduce transportation time, and develop infrastructure. In October 2018, the issue was included in the agenda of the First Forum of Regions of Belarus and Ukraine in Gomel, where Presidents Petro Poroshenko and Alexander Lukashenko signed a memorandum on cooperation between Kyiv Oblast, Minsk Oblast, and Gomel Oblast.

From 2019 to 2020, he was a member of the Presidium of the Political Council of the Agrarian Party of Ukraine.

In 2019, he ran for the Verkhovna Rada of Ukraine of the 9th convocation from the party Strength and Honor (No. 18 on the list) as a non-partisan, but the party did not overcome the electoral threshold.

== Academic activity ==
With the support of the Ministry of Foreign Affairs of the Kingdom of the Netherlands, he co-authored the scientific publication “Reform of the Security Service of Ukraine based on international experience”.

== Social activity ==
From June 2016 to July 2019, he was a member of the permanent police commission in the Main Directorate of the National Police of Ukraine of Kyiv Oblast. From June 2020 to October 2021, he was a member of the permanent police commission in the management of the Security Police of Kyiv Oblast.

== Personal life ==
His father is Ivan Ivanovych Stupak (1960–2021), a former People's Deputy of Ukraine of the 7th convocation, former employee of the Ministry of Internal Affairs and Security Service of Ukraine, deputy head of the Dnipropetrovsk Oblast State Administration.

He is married to Khrystyna Stupak. He has a son Ivan and a daughter Vira.
