= Rating (sociological group) =

Ukrainian non-governmental polling organization

Sociological group "RATING"
- Type: Polling organization
- Headquarters: Kyiv and Lviv, Ukraine
- Website: ratinggroup.com.ua/en

Rating (Ukrainian: Рейтинг), or fully the Sociological group "Rating" (Ukrainian: Соціологічнна група «Рейтинг»), is a Ukrainian independent, non-governmental research organization, that specializes in conducting all types of sociological research in compliance with international standards approved by the ESOMAR and WAPOR codes. It conducts national and regional political, thematic, marketing and media research on a regular basis. Sociological group "Rating" is a part of the Rating GroupTM "group of companies ". The company has branches in Kyiv and Lviv. The network of interviewers is composed of more than 500 people operating throughout Ukraine. The company is a permanent member of the Sociological Association of Ukraine.

Clients of the "Rating" Sociological Group are government agencies, non-governmental organizations, business structures, political parties / politicians, and various types of international and domestic media. The company regularly participates in international projects of the International Republican Institute, the Government of Canada, USAID, the World Bank, UNICEF, the National Endowment for Democracy (NED), universities in Poland, Denmark, Switzerland, etc.

The company conducts surveys both in Ukraine and abroad. The polls of the "Rating" group concern various spheres of public life.

During the Russian invasion of Ukraine, Rating continued to conduct research using the CATI survey method. The main research topics are the belief in the victory of Ukraine, trust of the Armed Forces, the assessment of the actions of the Ukrainian government, the level of national resistance, the assessment of international aid, the adaptation of Ukrainians to war, etc.
