= Odesa National Maritime University =

Public university in Odesa, Ukraine

Coordinates: 46.4839°N 30.7194°E

- Одеський національний морський університет
- Established: 1930
- Affiliations: Ministry of Education and Science of Ukraine
- Rector: Serhiy Rudenko
- Students: 5340 осіб.
- Location: Odesa, Chornomorsk, Ukraine
- Website: https://onmu.org.ua

The Odesa National Maritime University (Ukrainian: Одеський національний морський університет, romanized: Odeskyi natsionalnyi morskyi universytet) is a Ukrainian public university in Odesa. It was founded in 1930 and has trained students from over 90 countries in various disciplines related to maritime industry.

== See also ==
List of universities in Ukraine
