= List of people from Donetsk =

The citizens of Donetsk are commonly called Donechyani (Ukrainian: донеччани, Russian: дончани). The following is a list of famous people that were born or brought up in the city:

== Academics ==
- Alexander Anoprienko (born 1957), Professor of Computer Engineering.
- Volodymyr Biletskyy (born 1950), Ukrainian scientist.
- Anatoly Timofeevich Fomenko (born 1945), Russian Mathematician and lecturer at the Moscow University. Promoter of New Chronology.
- Valeriy Konovalyuk (born 1966), an economist and businessman.
- Alexander Kuzemsky (born 1944), Soviet and Russian theoretical physicist.
- Kirill Borisovich Tolpygo (1916–1994), Soviet physicist and a Corresponding Member of the National Academy of Sciences of Ukraine.

== Artists ==
- Viktor Burduk (born 1957), an artist, a blacksmith.
- Pavlo Vigderhaus (1925–2013), Soviet architect, Monument to a Miner creator.

== Athletes ==
- Aleksandr Androshkin (1947–2010), Soviet sports shooter.
- Polina Astakhova (1936–2005), Ukrainian gymnast.
- Konstantin Bakun (born 1985), Ukrainian volleyball player.
- Nadiya Beshevli (born 1982), Ukrainian former swimmer.
- Yuliya Beygelzimer (born 1983), Ukrainian tennis.
- Artem Bloshenko (born 1985), Ukrainian heavyweight judoka.
- Vyacheslav Bobrov (born 1992), Ukrainian basketball player.
- Danyil Boldyrev (born 1992), Ukrainian speed climber.
- Joel Bolomboy (born 1994), Ukrainian-born Russian-American professional basketball player.
- Bogdan Bondariew (born 1974), Ukrainian former professional cyclist.
- Serhiy Bubka (born 1963), Ukrainian pole vault athlete; Olympic Games champion: 1988; World Champion: 1983, 1987, 1991, 1995, European Champion: 1986; Champion of the USSR: 1984, 1985.
- Vladyslav Bukhov (born 2002), Ukrainian swimmer.
- Igor Bychkov (born 1987), Ukrainian-born pole vaulter.
- Yuriy Dehteryov (1948–2022), Soviet goalkeeper.
- Tetiana Dovzhenko (born 2002), Ukrainian female rhythmic gymnast.
- Volodymyr Dzhus (born 1993), Ukrainian professional racing cyclist.
- Yuri Evseichik (born 1971), Israeli Greco-Roman wrestler.
- Marta Fiedina (born 2002), Ukrainian synchro swimmer.
- Yuriy Gavrilov (born 1967), Ukrainian handballer player, Olympic gold medallist.
- Julia Glushko (born 1990), Ukrainian-born Israeli tennis player.
- Marina Goliadkina (born 1997), Ukrainian-born Russian synchronised swimmer.
- Olena Grechykhina (born 1991), Ukrainian competitor in synchronized swimming.
- Veronika Hryshko (born 2000), Ukrainian synchronised swimmer.
- Yelyzaveta Hubareva (born 2004), Ukrainian artistic gymnast.
- Ali Ismayilov (born 1974), Ukrainian boxer.
- Viktor Ivanov (1956–2007), Ukrainian boxer.
- Yevhen Kanana (born 1953), Soviet footballer and referee.
- Stanyslav Kashtanov (born 1984), Ukrainian-Russian boxer.
- Oleksandra Kashuba (born 1996), Ukrainian competitor in synchronized swimming.
- Valeriya Khanina (born 1999), Ukrainian rhythmic gymnast.
- Oleksandr Khotsianivskyi (born 1990), Ukrainian freestyle wrestler.
- Ganna Klymenko (born 1992), Ukrainian competitor in synchronized swimming.
- Natalia Kosmina (born 1982), Ukrainian para table tennis player.
- Vasyl Krainyk (born 1996), Ukrainian Paralympic swimmer.
- Andriy Kravchenko (born 1980), Ukrainian racecar driver.
- Nikita Kryvonos (born 1986), American former professional tennis player.
- Natalya Kushch-Mazuryk (born 1983), Ukrainian pole vaulter.
- Aleksandr Lebziak (born 1969), Russian boxer.
- Olga Liashchuk (born 1985), Ukrainian professional strongwoman and former Ukrainian National Rugby player
- Inna Logutenkova (born 1986), Ukrainian Olympic dressage rider.
- Denys Lukashov (born 1989), Ukrainian basketball player.
- Natalya Mammadova (born 1984), Ukrainian and Azerbaijani volleyball player.
- Oleksandr Martynenko (born 1989), Ukrainian cyclist.
- Nikita Mashtakov (born 1999), Ukrainian tennis player.
- Ilya Mate (born 1956), Soviet and Ukrainian freestyle wrestler.
- Maksym Mazuryk (born 1983), Ukrainian pole vaulter.
- Evgenij Miroshnichenko (born 1978), Ukrainian chess player.
- Viktor Miroshnichenko (born 1959), Ukrainian boxer.
- Mark Padun (born 1996), Ukrainian cyclist.
- Elina Partõka (born 1983), Estonian former swimmer.
- Oleksiy Pecherov (born 1985), a Ukrainian basketball player.
- Vitaly Petrov (born 1945), Ukrainian athletics coach, mainly specialising in pole vault.
- Volodymyr Pianykh (born 1951), Ukrainian football player.
- Valeriy Pidluzhny (1952–2021), Ukrainian long jumper.
- Lilia Podkopayeva (born 1978), a Ukrainian gymnast, and the 1996 Olympic All Around Champion.
- Svitlana Prokopova (born 1993), Ukrainian group rhythmic gymnast.
- Serhii Rebrov (born 1974), football player.
- Olha Saladukha (born 1983), Ukrainian former triple jumper.
- Issuf Sanon (born 1999), Ukrainian professional basketball player.
- Hanna Shelekh (born 1993), Ukrainian athlete.
- Alina Shynkarenko (born 1998), Ukrainian synchronised swimmer.
- Viktor Sidyak (born 1943), fencing, first Soviet individual sabre Olympic gold medal in Munich 1972, multiple times winner of World Championships and Olympic medalist (1968, 1972, 1976 and 1980).
- Viktor Smyrnov (born 1986), Paralympic swimmer.
- Aleksandr Tkachenko (born 1955), Soviet Olympic boxer.
- Nadiya Tkachenko (born 1948), Ukrainian Olympic-gold winning pentathlete.
- Dmitri Tolstenkov (born 1973), Ukrainian former track cyclist.
- Oleg Tverdovsky (born 1976), Russian ice hockey player.
- Iryna Ustymenko (born 1966), Ukrainian former butterfly and freestyle swimmer.
- Yanika Vartlaan (born 1999), Ukrainian rhythmic gymnast.
- Oleg Verniaiev (born 1993), Ukrainian artistic gymnast, Olympic gold medallist.
- Alexander Yagubkin (born 1961), Soviet Olympic boxer.
- Yelyzaveta Yakhno (born 1998), Ukrainian synchronised swimmer.
- Yuriy Yermakov (born 1970), Ukrainian gymnast.
- Artem Yevlyanov (born 1986), Ukrainian football player.
- Viktor Yevsyukov (born 1956), Soviet javelin thrower.
- Yevhen Yudenkov (born 1993), Ukrainian artistic gymnast.
- Denys Yurchenko (born 1978), Ukrainian pole vaulter.

== Business ==
- Rinat Akhmetov (born 1966), Ukraine's wealthiest businessman, founder of System Capital Management, No. 47 in Forbes' The World's Billionaires.
- Serhiy Arbuzov (born 1976), head of Ukrainian Bank.
- Akhat Bragin (1953–1995), businessman and mobster.
- Valeriy Konovalyuk (born 1966), an economist and businessman.
- Oleksandr Ryzhenkov (born 1950), Hero of Ukraine recipient
- Ihor Sorkin (born 1967), head of the Ukrainian National Bank.

== Entertainers ==
- Vera Filatova (born 1982), actress.
- Jinjer, Ukrainian heavy metal band.
- Yuri Kara (born 1954), Russian film director and producer.
- Anna Korsun (born 1986), Ukrainian singer, pianist, organist, conductor, composer and academic teacher, based in Germany.
- Khrystyna Kots-Hotlib (born 1983), Ukrainian singer.
- Tatyana Kravchenko (born 1953), Soviet and Russian actress.
- Make Me Famous - English language Metalcore band.
- Master SheFF, the leader of Bad Balance and creator of Russian hip hop.
- Siouzana Melikián (born 1986), a Russian-Mexican actress.
- Omnia (born 1987), Ukrainian DJ and music producer and sometimes singer.
- Vadim Pisarev (born 1965), Ukrainian dancer and art Director of Donetsk State Academic Opera and Ballet Theatre named after Solovyanenko.
- Aleksandr Revva (born 1974), comedian.
- Denis Shaforostov (born 1992), Ukrainian musician, vocalist for Asking Alexandria.
- Tatiana Shmailyuk (born 1987), Vocalist for Ukrainian metal band Jinjer.
- Anyuta Slavskaya (born 1983), Ukrainian-Russian singer and TV presenter.
- Oleg Stefan (born 1959), Russian actor.
- Anatoliy Solovyanenko (1932–1999), Soviet opera singer.
- Vladimir Grigoryevich Zakharov (1901–1956), Soviet composer.
- Svitlana Zakharova (born 1987), Ukrainian singer-songwriter in the jazz, classical and estrada genres as well a director of concert programs.
- Zhanulka (born 2004), singer, songwriter.

== Journalists ==
- Stanislav Aseyev (born 1989), Ukrainian writer and journalist.
- Dmytro Gnap (born 1977), journalist, investigating corruption.
- Oleksiy Matsuka (born 1983), corruption investigator, Reporters Without Borders named Matsuka in its list of 100 Information Heroes.

== Military ==
- Fyodor Berezin (born 1960), Russian-language science fiction writer and Deputy Minister of Defence of the Donetsk People's Republic.
- Mikhail Krichevsky (1897–2008), the last surviving World War I veteran who fought for the Russian Empire.
- Aleksandr Zakharchenko (1976–2018), Prime Minister of the self-proclaimed Donetsk People's Republic.

== Politicians ==
- Zalman Aran (Aharonovich) (1899–1970), Israeli social-democratic politician, minister of education (1955–1960) and (1963–1969).
- Mykola Azarov (born 1947), former Prime Minister of Ukraine
- Nikita Khrushchev (1894–1971), General Secretary of the CPSU and Premier of the Soviet Union 1953–1964 (born in Kalinovka, Kursk Oblast, Russia but grew up in Yuzivka).
- Volodymyr Rybak (born 1946), Mayor of Donetsk and Chairman of the Verkhovna Rada.
- Natan Sharansky (born 1948), former Soviet dissident, anticommunist, Zionist, Israeli politician and writer.
- Petro Symonenko (born 1952), head of the Communist Party of Ukraine.
- Viktor Yanukovych (born 1950), deposed former president of Ukraine (due to Euromaidan Revolts of 2013–2014)
- Aleksandr Zakharchenko (1976–2018), Prime Minister of the self-proclaimed Donetsk People's Republic.

== Writers ==
- Emma Andijewska (born 1931), Ukrainian poet.
- Fyodor Berezin (born 1960), Russian-language science fiction writer and Deputy Minister of Defence of the Donetsk People's Republic.
- Janina Dziarnowska (1903–1992), Ukrainian born Polish writer and translator, publicist, and expert on Soviet literature.
- Dmytro Hnap (born 1977), Ukrainian journalist at Slidstvo.Info and Hromadske.TV.
- Iya Kiva (born 1984), Ukrainian poet, translator, journalist, and critic.
- Yuri Levitansky (1922–1996), Russian-language poet and translator.
- Oleksiy Matsuka (born 1983), Ukrainian journalist.
- Vladislav Adolfovitch Rusanov (born 1966), Russian-language science fiction writer and chairman of the Donetsk People's Republic Writer's Union.
- Vasyl Stus (1938–1985), Ukrainian poet and publicist, one of the most active members of Ukrainian dissident movement.

== Other ==
- Ismail Abdullaiev (born 1966), director of pro-Russian television channels in Ukraine.
- Diana Berg (born 1979), human rights activist and graphic designer.
- Dmytriy Leonidovich Cherniavskiy (born 1971), senior manager and political adviser.
- Yevgeny Khaldei (1917–1997), Soviet photographer known for his photograph of a Soviet soldier raising a flag over the Reichstag.
- Marina Tsvigun (born 1960), religious sect leader, new age movement.
