= Anatoliy Burlin =

Ukrainian footballer (born 1990)

Personal information
- Full name: Anatoliy Andriyovych Burlin
- Date of birth: 19 January 1990 (age 36)
- Place of birth: Henichesk, Ukrainian SSR
- Height: 1.86 m (6 ft 1 in)
- Position: Centre-back

Team information
- Current team: Zlatokray-2017 Zolotonosha

Youth career
- 2003–2004: Illichivets Mariupol
- 2004–2007: Dynamo Kyiv

Senior career*
Years	Team	Apps	(Gls)
2007	Dynamo-3 Kyiv	1	(0)
2009–2010	Arsenal Bila Tserkva	41	(0)
2011	Lviv	8	(0)
2011–2012	Sevastopol	3	(0)
2012	→ Tytan Armiansk (loan)	10	(0)
2012–2013	Helios Kharkiv	8	(0)
2013–2014	Stal Dniprodzerzhynsk	26	(1)
2014	Desna Chernihiv	6	(0)
2014–2016	Cherkaskyi Dnipro	39	(0)
2016	Veres Rivne	0	(0)
2017–2019	Cherkashchyna	61	(1)
2020–2022	LNZ Cherkasy	22	(1)
2022–	Zlatokray-2017 Zolotonosha	8	(2)

International career^{‡}
2005	Ukraine U16	1	(0)
2005	Ukraine U17	4	(0)
- * Club domestic league appearances and goals as of 20 April 2023 ‡ National team caps and goals as of 6 April 2017

Anatoliy Andriyovych Burlin (Ukrainian: Анатолій Андрійович Бурлін; born 19 January 1990) is a Ukrainian footballer who plays as a centre-back for Zlatokray-2017 Zolotonosha.

== Club career ==
Burlin began his career with Dynamo-3 Kyiv, after which he joined several clubs in the Ukrainian Second and First leagues. In 2011, he signed with Sevastopol in the Ukrainian First League.
