= Ihor Kozlovskyi =

Ukrainian scientist and theologian (1954–2023)

- Ігор Козловський
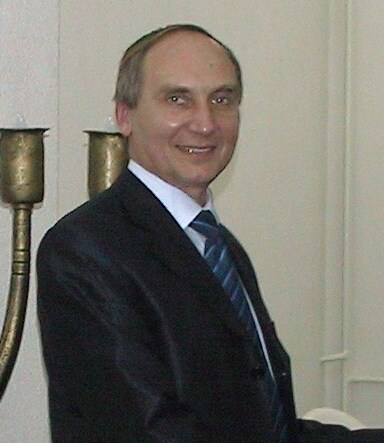
- Kozlovskyi in 2005
- Born: 16 February 1954; Makiivka, Donetsk Oblast, Ukrainian SSR, USSR
- Died: 6 September 2023 (aged 69)
- Occupations: Scientist, theologian, historian, writer

Ihor Anatoliyovych Kozlovskyi (Ukrainian: І́гор Анато́лійович Козло́вський; 16 February 1954 – 6 September 2023) was a Ukrainian scholar, theologian, candidate of historical sciences, writer and public figure. He was a full member of the Donetsk branch of the Shevchenko Scientific Society in Ukraine from 2019. He was also a senior researcher of the Department of Religious Studies of the Hryhorii Skovoroda Institute of Philosophy of the National Academy of Sciences of Ukraine.

Kozlovskyi was also the president of the Centre for Religious Studies and International Spiritual Relations, head of the Donetsk Regional Branch of the Ukrainian Association of Religious Studies, president of the Discovery Centre and vice president of the Ukrainian Centre for Islamic Studies.

Kozlovskyi was a member of the Expert Council on Freedom of Conscience and Religious Organizations at the Ministry of Culture of Ukraine, an advisor to the Minister of Culture, Youth, and Sports of Ukraine, a member of PEN Ukraine and a member of the initiative group First of December.

In 2016, during the Russian occupation of the Donbas, he was captured by the forces of the Russian proxy government, placed in a Izolyatsia prison in Donetsk and tortured. He was released in a prisoner exchange with Ukraine in December 2017.

== Biography ==
Ihor Anatoliyovych Kozlovskyi was born on 16 February, 1954.

From 1972 to 1974, he served in the Border Troops in the Transcaucasia Border District on the border with Iran.

He studied at the Faculty of History of Donetsk State University from 1975 to 1980, graduating with honours as a Historian and Teacher of History and Social Sciences. Between 1980 and 1984, he attended graduate school of the Institute of History of the National Academy of Sciences of Ukraine.

Kozlovskyi worked in the Donetsk Regional Executive Committee from 1980 to 2001, and then in the Donetsk Regional State Administration. He held various positions in the field of religion, including officer, senior officer, chief specialist, and head of the regional department of religion.

Starting in 1980, he taught and lectured on religious studies at universities in Ukraine and the United States. In 2001, he became Associate Professor of Religious Studies at Donetsk State Institute of Artificial Intelligence (later the State University of Informatics and Artificial Intelligence), and head of the Centre for Religious Studies and International Spiritual Relations. From 2011 to 2015, he was an associate professor at the Department of Philosophy of Donetsk National Technical University.

In 2012, Kozlovskyi defended his dissertation to obtain a scientific degree of a Candidate of Historical Sciences in the specialty of Religious Studies.

On 27 January 2016, he was captured by the militants of the so-called Donetsk People's Republic, a proxy organization for Russian occupation of Ukraine's Donbas, due to his pro-Ukrainian views. He was subjected to torture and held captive for almost two years, until his release on 27 December, 2017.

Kozlovskyi authored more than 50 scholarly books and over 200 articles in dictionaries, encyclopedias, academic periodicals, as well as poetic collections and prose works.

Ihor Kozlovskyi died from a heart attack on 6 September, 2023, at the age of 69.

== Awards and honours ==
For his peacekeeping activities, Ihor Kozlovskyi received several prestigious awards and honors. He was awarded the medal of the Austrian Society of Albert Schweitzer, the Knight Order of the Royal Brotherhood of St. Feotonia (Portugal), and Honours of the Academy Budo (Martial Arts) Nippon Seybucan (Japan). He was also a valid member of the Royal College of Norkity (Portugal), and an honorary citizen of Oklahoma (USA).

== Sources ==
- Хроніка Донецького відділення Наукового Товариства ім. Шевченка / Упорядник і редактор В. С. Білецький. — Донецьк: НТШ, 2012. — Число 2. — 192 с.
