= Henichesk =

Town in Kherson Oblast, Ukraine

Henichesk Генічеськ
- City
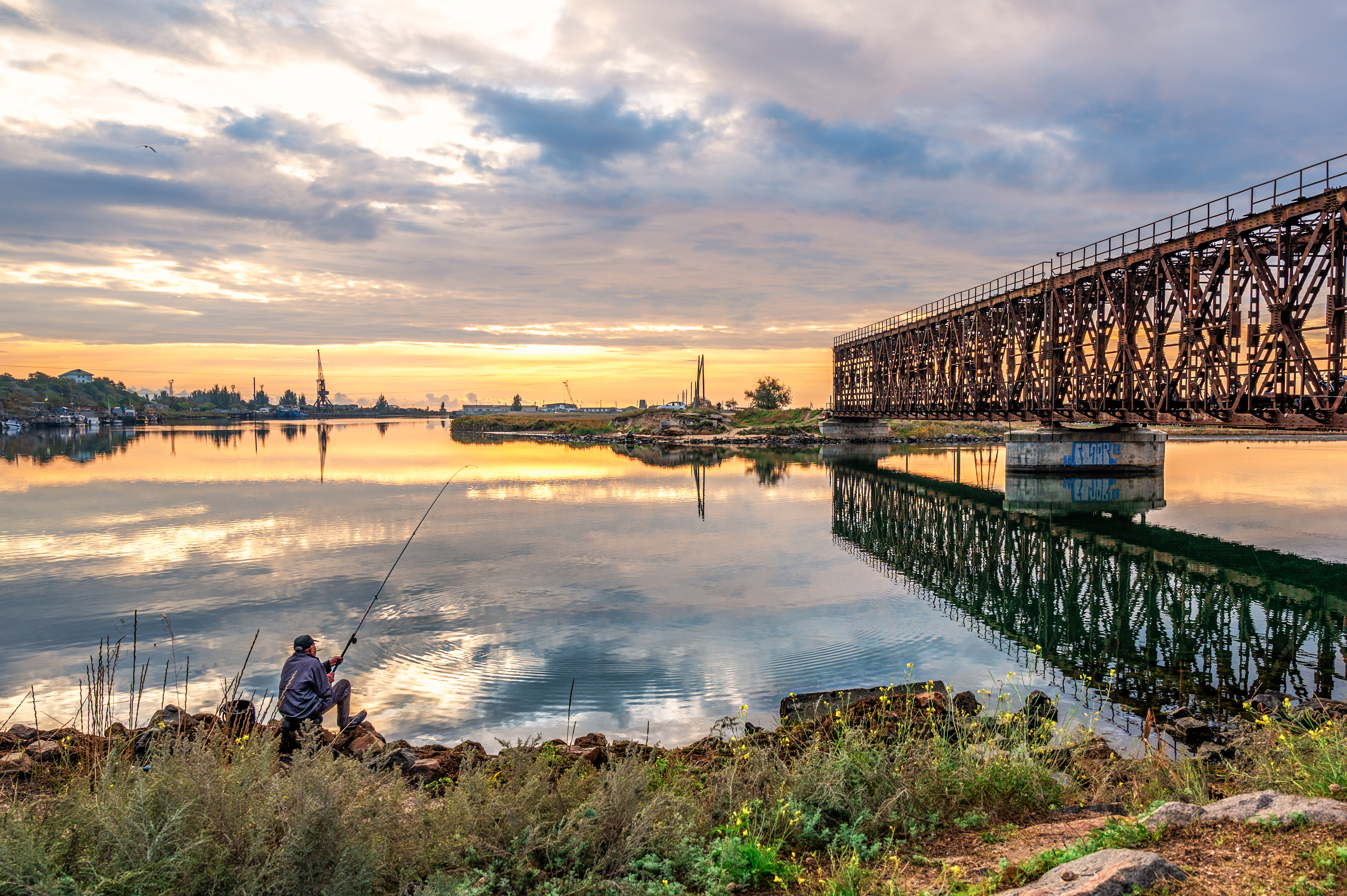
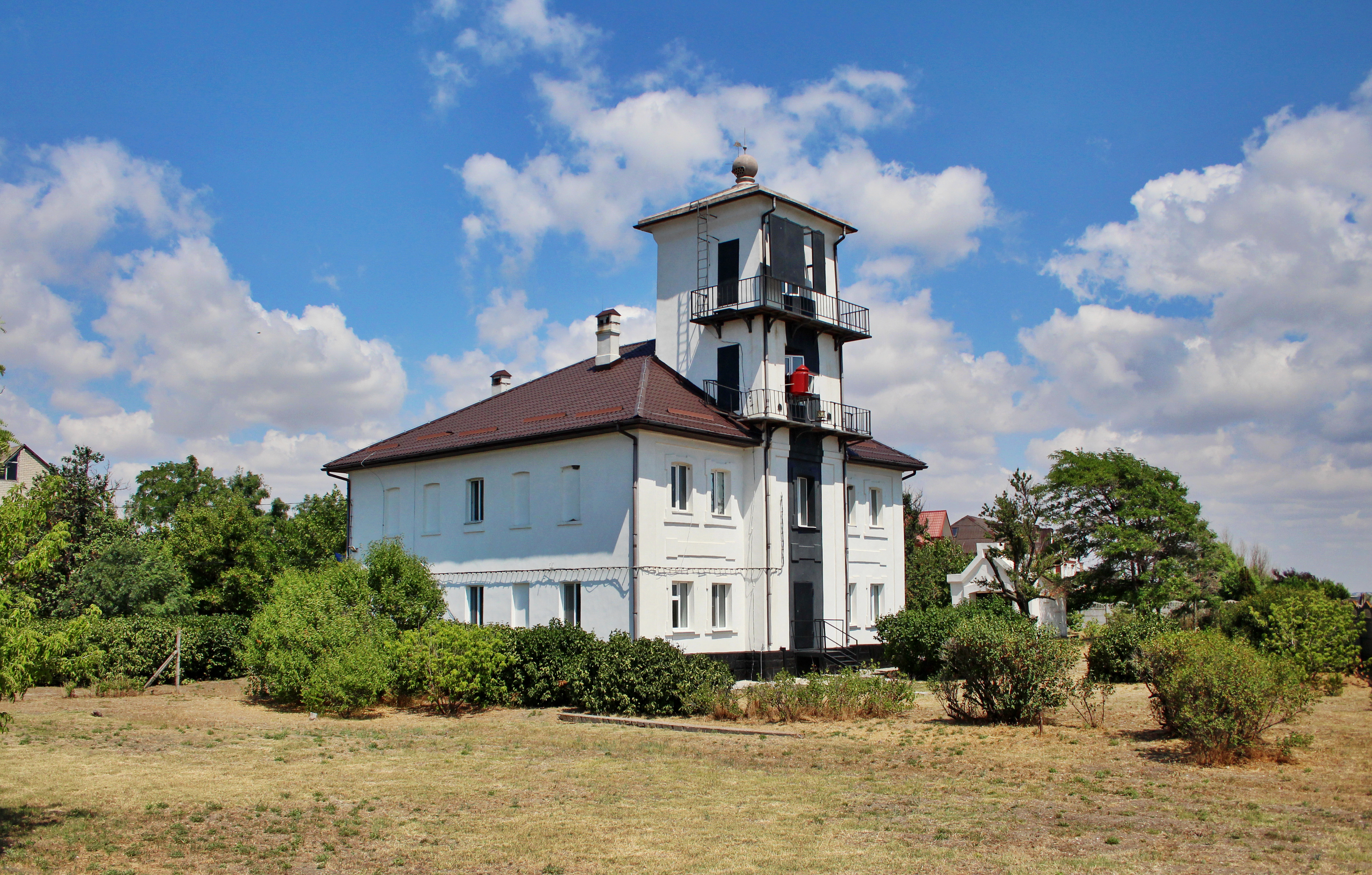
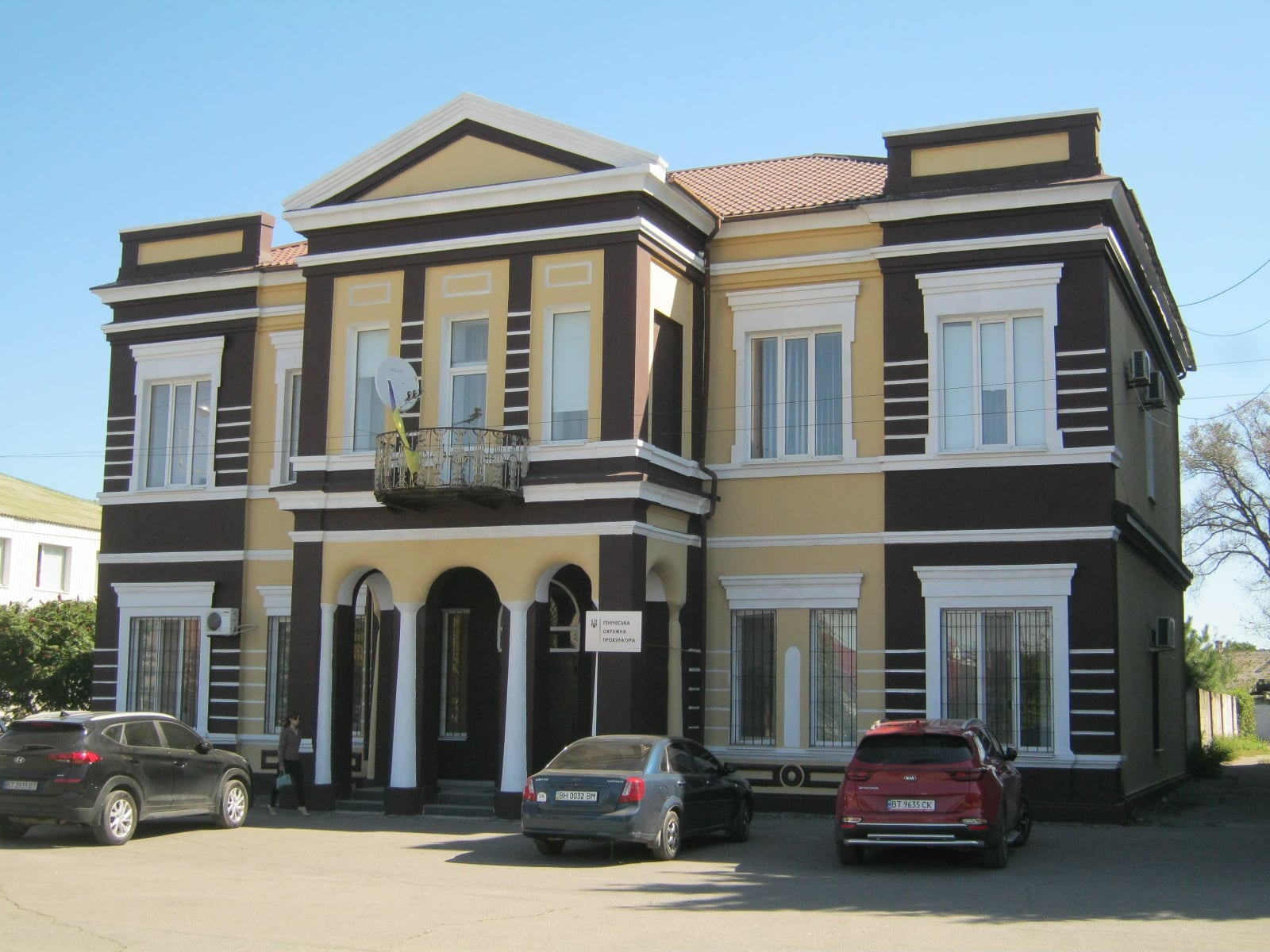
- Railway bridge Lighthouse Former City Hall

- Flag Coat of arms
- Interactive map of Henichesk
- Location of Henichesk Henichesk (Ukraine)
- Coordinates: 46°10′N 34°48′E
- Country: Ukraine
- Oblast: Kherson Oblast
- Raion: Henichesk Raion
- Hromada: Henichesk urban hromada
- Founded: 1784
- City status: 1938

Area
  - Total: 7.04 km^{2} (2.72 sq mi)
- Elevation: 16 m (52 ft)

Population (2022)
  - Total: 18,889 ▼
  - Density: 2,680/km^{2} (6,950/sq mi)
- Postal code: 75500-75509
- Area code: (+380) 5534
- Vehicle registration: BT / 22
- Website: www.genichesk.com.ua

Henichesk (Ukrainian: Генічеськ, IPA: [ɦeˈn⁽ʲ⁾itʃesʲk]; Russian: Геническ, romanized: Genichesk, IPA: [ɡʲɪˈnʲitɕɪsk]) is a port city along the Sea of Azov in Kherson Oblast, southern Ukraine. It serves as the administrative centre of Henichesk Raion. Since 9 November 2022, it has served as the temporary administrative centre of the Russian occupation administration in the region. Henichesk also hosts the administration of Henichesk urban hromada, one of the hromadas of Ukraine. In January 2022, Henichesk had an estimated population of 18,889.

As a result of the Russian invasion of Ukraine, the city has been under Russian occupation. Following the 2022 Ukrainian southern counteroffensive, Henichesk became the de facto administrative centre of the oblast under Russian occupation.

== History ==
In 1640 Evliya Çelebi mentioned a Chenishke fortress. The name Henichesk is derived from a Turkic root for "narrow" referring to a thin strip of Azov Sea nearby. In 1648 Guillaume de Beauplan described it: "is but two hundred paces over, and fordable in calm weather".

After the annexation of Crimean Khanate, Henichesk was founded as a fort by the Russian Empire in 1784 and from 1812 was also known as Ust-Ozivske. It was a port and a trade center on the salt route that went from Crimea north to Ukraine and Russia. At the turn of the 20th century, it was the location of one of the largest flour mills in southern Ukraine.

During the Ukrainian War of Independence, from 1917 to 1920, it passed between various factions. Afterwards it was administratively part of the Zaporizhzhia Governorate of Ukraine.

During World War II, the town was occupied by Nazi Germany. The Germans operated a prison in the town.

=== 2022 Russian invasion of Ukraine ===
On 24 February 2022, Henichesk was seized by the Russian army as a result of the escalating Russo-Ukrainian War. During this process, an incident occurred where an old woman confronted Russian soldiers and said "Put sunflower seeds in your pockets so they grow on Ukraine soil when you die." The city was also the scene of the death of Vitalii Skakun, who died blowing up a bridge in an attempt to stop the Russian advance.

On 18 April, Russian forces restored the monument of Lenin, which had been removed by the Ukrainian government as part of the country's decommunization process.

On 3 June, Volodymyr Zelenskyy decreed the creation of a military administration for the city.

On 9 November, separatist leader and deputy head of the military–civilian administration of Russian-occupied Kherson, Kirill Stremousov, died in a crash near Henichesk.

On 21 November, Ismail Abdullaiev and the Tavria TV channel relocated to Henichesk from Kherson after it was recaptured by Ukrainian forces.

== Demographics ==
Ethnic makeup of the town according to the 2001 Ukrainian census:

Ethnic groups in Henichesk
	percent
Ukrainians	69.50%
Russians	26.12%
Tatars	1.47%
Belarusians	0.49%
Armenians	0.29%
Moldovans	0.14%
Jews	0.11%

Distribution by native language:

Native languages in Henichesk
	percent
Russian	69.0%
Ukrainian	29.4%
Others	1.5%

== Geography ==
=== Location ===
Henichesk is located at the point of connection between the Sea of Azov and Syvash bay. Arabat Spit, which is located in the vicinity, contains numerous salt lakes, the biggest of which, Henicheske, bears the name of the city.

=== Climate ===
Under the Köppen climate classification, Henichesk has a humid continental climate that closely borders on a semi-arid climate with cold winters and warm summers.

Climate data for Henichesk (1991–2020, extremes 1883–present)
Month	Jan	Feb	Mar	Apr	May	Jun	Jul	Aug	Sep	Oct	Nov	Dec	Year
Record high °C (°F)	13.9 (57.0)	18.3 (64.9)	22.4 (72.3)	30.0 (86.0)	31.8 (89.2)	35.3 (95.5)	38.3 (100.9)	38.7 (101.7)	36.8 (98.2)	29.2 (84.6)	23.6 (74.5)	17.8 (64.0)	38.7 (101.7)
Mean daily maximum °C (°F)	1.7 (35.1)	2.7 (36.9)	7.5 (45.5)	14.1 (57.4)	21.3 (70.3)	26.4 (79.5)	29.3 (84.7)	28.8 (83.8)	22.7 (72.9)	15.5 (59.9)	8.5 (47.3)	3.7 (38.7)	15.2 (59.4)
Daily mean °C (°F)	−1.0 (30.2)	−0.4 (31.3)	3.9 (39.0)	10.2 (50.4)	17.0 (62.6)	21.8 (71.2)	24.4 (75.9)	23.8 (74.8)	18.2 (64.8)	11.7 (53.1)	5.6 (42.1)	1.0 (33.8)	11.4 (52.5)
Mean daily minimum °C (°F)	−3.2 (26.2)	−2.9 (26.8)	1.2 (34.2)	6.8 (44.2)	12.9 (55.2)	17.3 (63.1)	19.5 (67.1)	19.0 (66.2)	14.0 (57.2)	8.4 (47.1)	3.1 (37.6)	−1.2 (29.8)	7.9 (46.2)
Record low °C (°F)	−30.3 (−22.5)	−28.0 (−18.4)	−18.4 (−1.1)	−9.0 (15.8)	−2.2 (28.0)	0.2 (32.4)	8.4 (47.1)	6.0 (42.8)	−5.4 (22.3)	−12.2 (10.0)	−20.8 (−5.4)	−22.1 (−7.8)	−30.3 (−22.5)
Average precipitation mm (inches)	36 (1.4)	29 (1.1)	34 (1.3)	32 (1.3)	37 (1.5)	40 (1.6)	24 (0.9)	28 (1.1)	32 (1.3)	31 (1.2)	33 (1.3)	38 (1.5)	394 (15.5)
Average precipitation days (≥ 1.0 mm)	7.3	5.9	6.8	5.8	5.8	5.3	3.2	2.8	4.2	5.2	5.8	6.8	64.9
Average relative humidity (%)	88.5	85.8	81.2	75.4	71.7	67.9	64.8	64.3	71.9	80.1	86.0	88.6	77.2
Mean monthly sunshine hours	46.5	77.0	130.2	208.5	308.5	306.0	311.6	310.0	232.5	161.2	55.5	43.4	2,190.8
Source 1: Pogoda.ru NCEI (humidity and precipitation 1991–2020)
Source 2: Climatebase.ru (sun 1891–2005)

== Economy ==
Henichesk is the location of a sea port. Traditional branches of the local economy are fishing and production of salt from the nearby lakes.

== Notable people ==
- Anatoliy Burlin (born 1990), Ukrainian footballer
- Yosyp Abramovych Daits (1897–1954), Ukrainian artist
- Joseph Liberman (1917-1941), Soviet-Ukrainian mathematician
- Iuliia Mendel, Ukrainian journalist

== Gallery ==
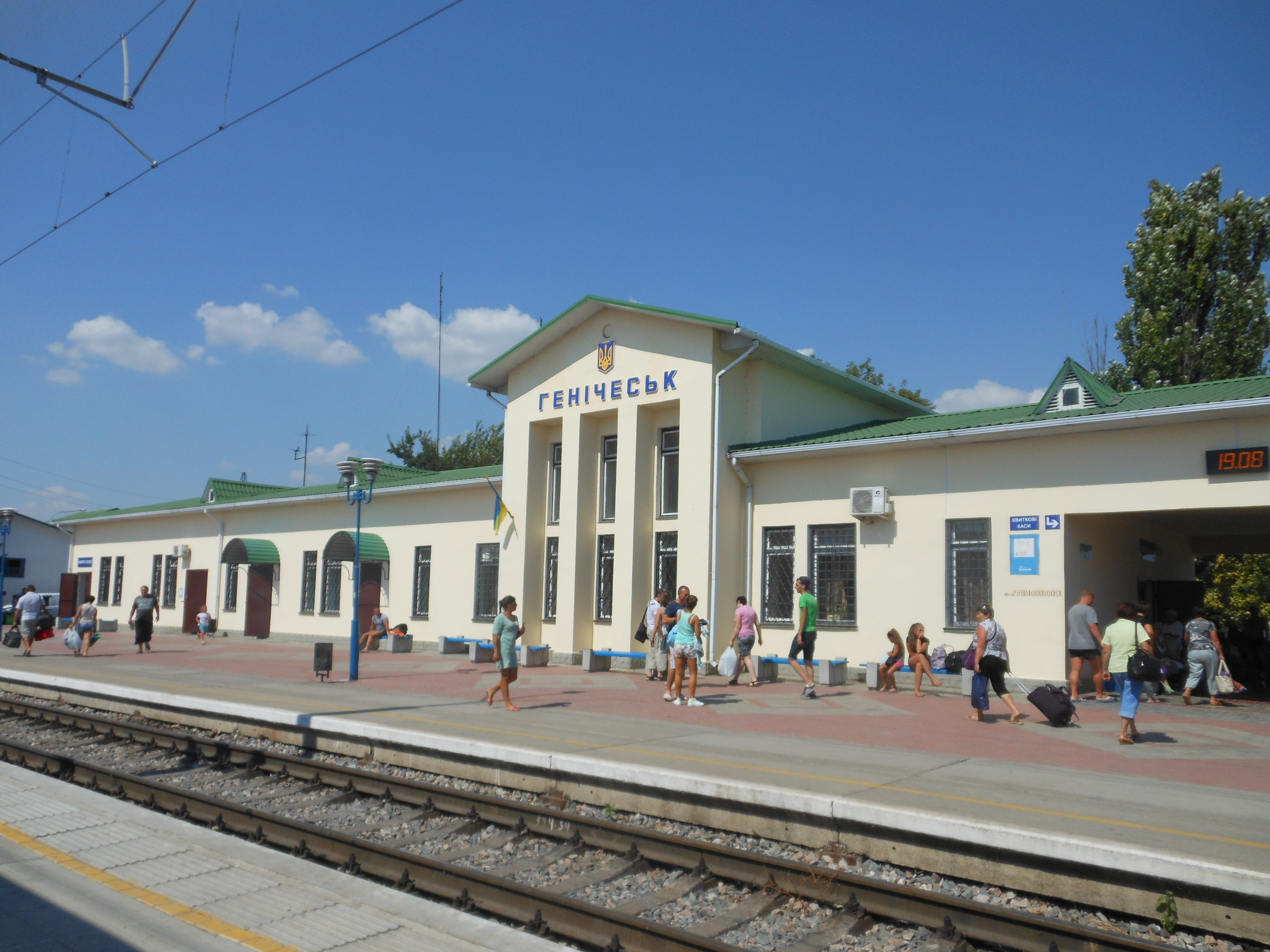
Train station

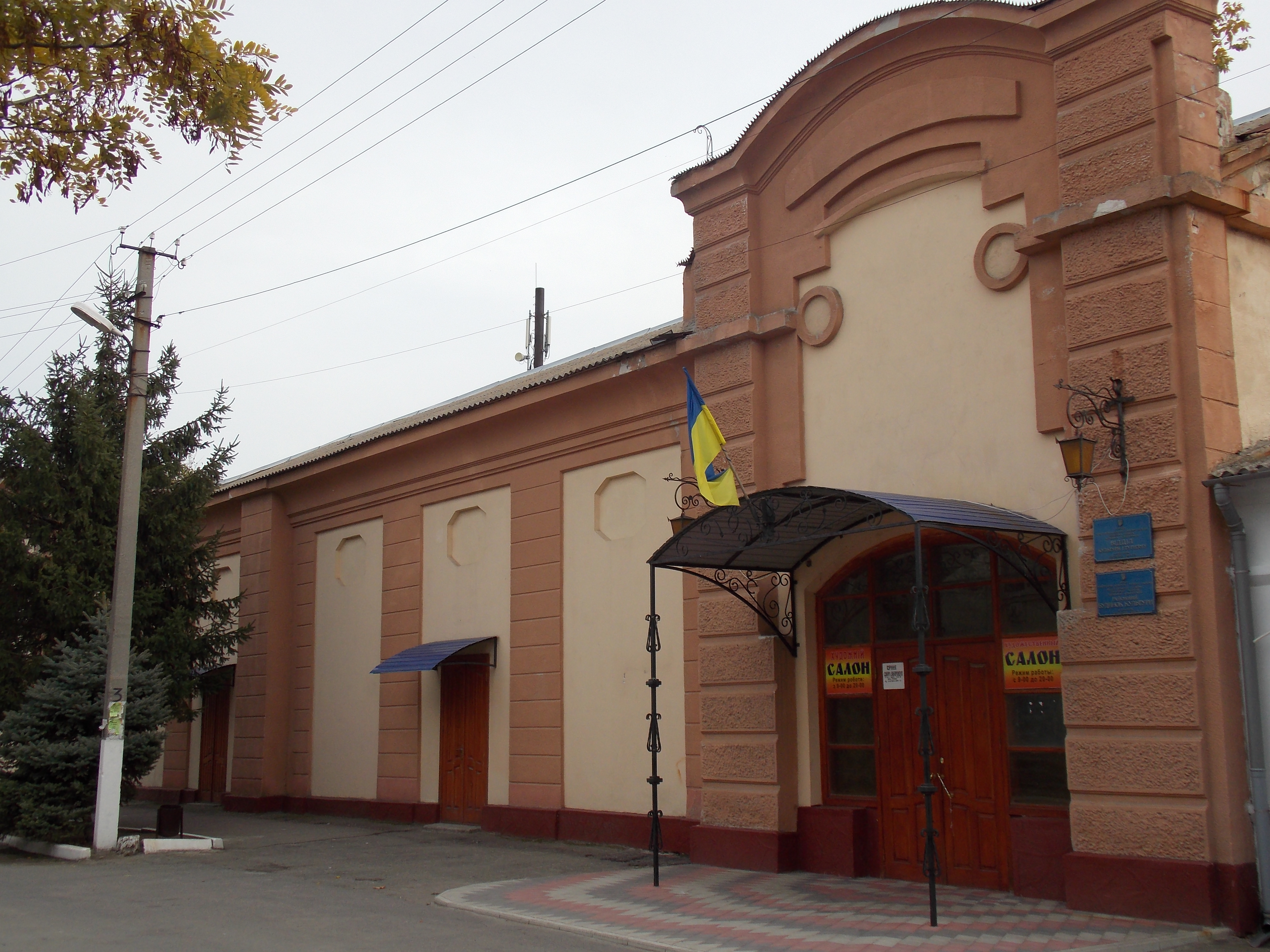
House of culture

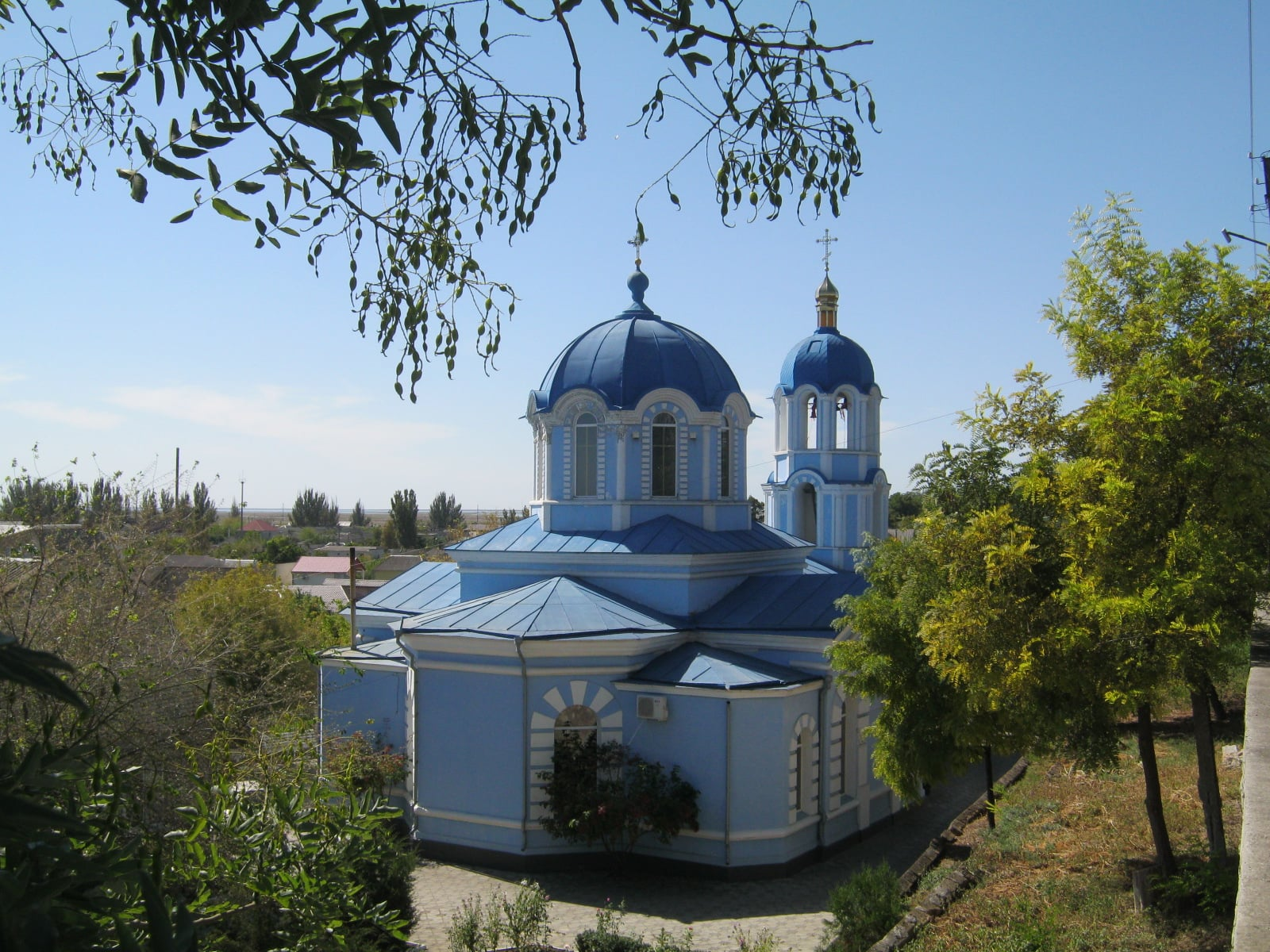
Church of the Nativity of Virgin Mary

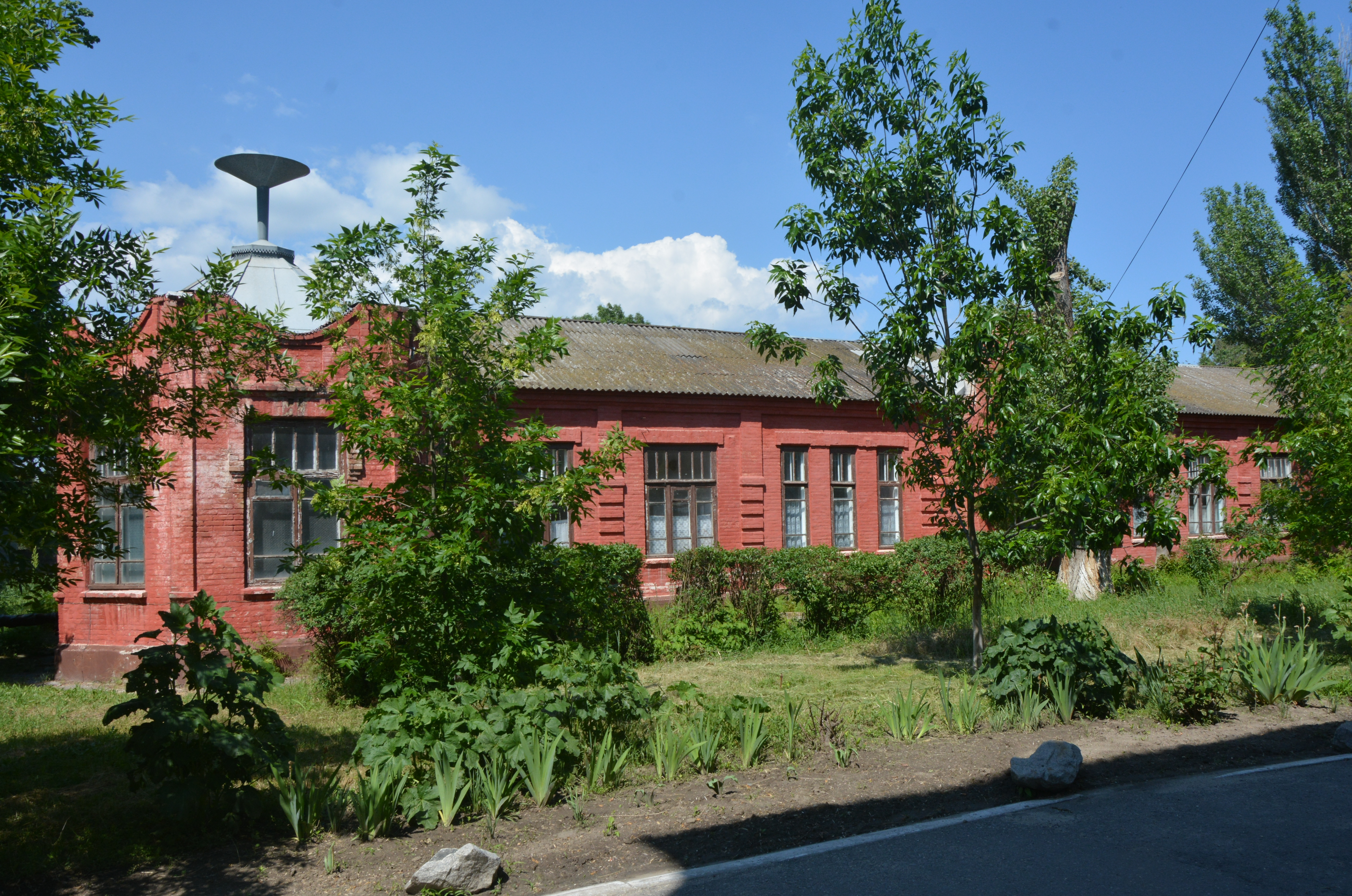
Former hospital

== See also ==
- List of cities in Ukraine
