= Donetsk National Technical University =

University in Donetsk, Ukraine

Coordinates: 48.278166°N 37.178304°E

- Донецкий национальный технический университет НЗВО «Донецький національний технічний університет»
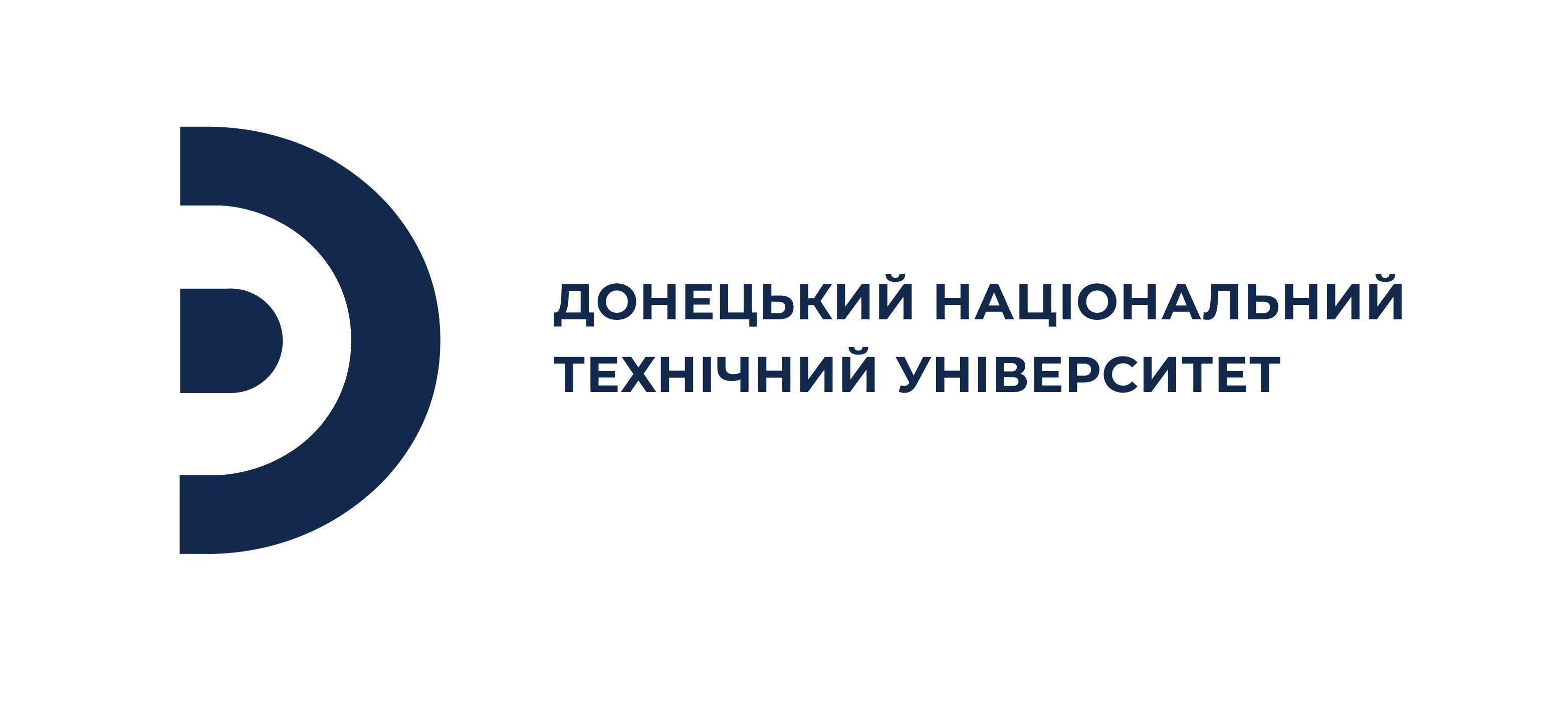
- Ukrainian Campus Logo
- Motto: Vivat, Crescat, Floreat!
- Type: University
- Established: 1921
- Affiliations: Ministry of Education and Science of Ukraine
- Chancellor: Denys Shylenko (Drohobych); Alexander Anoprienko (Donetsk)
- Undergraduates: 28000
- Location: Drohobych / Donetsk, Lviv Oblast / Donetsk Oblast, Ukraine
- Campus: urban
- Website: www.donntu.ru (Donetsk) donntu.edu.ua (Lviv)

University rankings

Regional – Overall
- QS Emerging Europe and Central Asia: 251-300 (2022)

The Donetsk National Technical University (abbr. DonNTU, formerly Donetsk Polytechnic Institute as well as other names) is the largest and oldest higher education institution established in Donbas, founded in 1921. Since 2024, a Ukrainian-controlled campus has been operating in Drohobych, Lviv Oblast, due to the Russo-Ukrainian war. The Russian-controlled campus in Donetsk continues to operate, leaving the university effectively split between the two governments.

== History ==
The university was founded in 1921, becoming the first higher education institution in the Donbass.

In the early years of the university, it was attended by Nikita Khrushchev.

In 1941 the university temporarily relocated to Prokopyevsk, RSFSR (modern day Russia).

Following the loss of Ukrainian government control over Donetsk in 2014 during the war in Donbas, the university split into two. One branch of the university continued to operate in Donetsk, while the other was evacuated to Pokrovsk.

As of 2022, the Donetsk National Technical University has been accredited in Russia, and graduates have begun receiving Russian-recognized diplomas.

In December of 2023 the Russian branch of the university won a gold medal at Russia’s competitive programming championship.

On 28 February 2024, the temporary university building in Ukrainian-controlled Pokrovsk was partially destroyed by a Russian missile attack. It was decided to move the Ukrainian campus' activities much further away from the frontline this time, first to Lutsk, and then to Drohobych (in Lviv Oblast).

== Structure ==
The Donetsk National Technical University (DonNTU) is the first higher education establishment in the Donbas Region and one of the first technical universities in Ukraine. 27,000 students study at 7 faculties, 60 specialities being their major. There are 28 correspondent members and academicians of the engineering academies, 18 honorary researchers and professors among the academics of the university. A number of scientists of DonNTU are honorary and full members of foreign organizations and academies. There are professors and students whose work was supported by the Soros Fund.

== DPI team ==
From 1987—1996, the university had a group known as the DPI team participating in the popular comedic game-show KVN. It contained a number of figures, made up of students who were studying at the university and would later become prominent within Russian & Ukrainian society, including Ismail Abdullaiev and Serhii Syvokho.

== Cooperation ==
- DonNTU (Russian Branch) has more than 110 cooperation agreements with universities all over the world.
- There is an office of the Siemens company at the university.
- At the three engineering faculties (German, French, and English) students are trained in the appropriate foreign language.
- A Polish faculty has been established.
- Thirty professors from foreign universities are Honorary Doctors of DonNTU.
- The university has a reading room sponsored by the Goethe Institute, Germany.

Donetsk National Technical University is a member of the EAU (European Association of Universities).

DonNTU (Russian branch) is a member of the following organizations:

- World Union of Mine Surveyors
- Paris Chamber of Commerce and Industry
- European Society for Engineering Education
- International Society for Engineering Education
- European Association for International Education
- International Union of Mechanical Engineers
- International Hydrogen Energy Association
- Interelectromash
- Interuniversity Agency of Francophone Universities
- Network of engineering universities "n+i"
- Eurasian Association of Universities
- International Academy of Informatization
- Association of Human Resources Professionals
- CONCORD International Academy
- Friendship without Borders Association
- Consortium of African and Mediterranean Universities
- World Alumni Association
- Association of Technical Universities
- Russian Knowledge Society
- NEDRA University Consortium

DonNTU (Ukrainian branch) is a member of the following organizations:

- UICEE – The International Engineering Education Centre sponsored by UNESCO, Melbourne, Australia
- EAIE – European Association of International Education
- EAAU – Euro-Asian Association of Universities
- SEFI – European Association of Engineering Education
- IGIP – International Association of Engineering Education (Austria)
- COFRAMA – French Council on Management links development with the countries of the CIS and Russia (Lion, France); PRELUDE – International Association of Research and links with universities (Belgium)
- CEUME – Consortium of Management Education in Ukraine (the US, Poland)
- URAN – Ukrainian Educational and Research Network sponsored by the NATO and German Research Network

DonNTU is a participant in the following international programmes:

- TEMPUS-TACIS NCD-JEP – 23125-2002 European Studios; DAAD Eastern Partnerships (Germany)
- Stipend of the International Board of the Ministry of Education and Science (the German Aerodynamics Center)
- BWTZ-Programm (Germany, the Ministry of Science)
- INTAS – Publishing House (Germany)
- BMEU/CEUME Business - Management - Education (USA, Poland)
- The Jozef Mihknowski Science Development Fund (Poland)
- Students Exchange Programmes AIESEC (Poland)
- Grant from the Ministry of Education and Sports, Poland
- Grant from the Ministry of Education and Science (Russia)
- Programme Dnipro (France)
- Grant of the Special School of Social Works, Construction and Industry (ESTP), (France)
- Grant from the government of Czech Republic
- SIDA – Master and Bachelor programme Sandwich (Sweden)

== Notable people ==
=== Academics ===
- Oleksandr Anopriyenko
- Mykola Azarov, politician, former Prime Minister of Ukraine.
- Volodymyr Biletskyy, mining engineer, researcher in the field of coal mining, publisher and political scientist.
- Ihor Kozlovskyi, scholar, theologian, candidate of historical sciences, writer and public figure.
- Anatoliy Solovianenko, operatic tenor, People's Artist of the USSR, People's Artist of Ukraine, and Shevchenko National Prize winner.

=== Alumni ===
- Stanislav Aseyev, writer, journalist, and human rights activist.
- Diana Berg, human rights activist, educator, and graphic designer.
- Olha Buslavets, power engineer and civil servant.
- Vitaliy Haiduk, businessman and politician.
- Nikita Khrushchev, former First Secretary of the Communist Party of the Soviet Union.
- Andriy Klyuyev, businessman and politician.
- Oleksandr Liashko, politician.
- Volodymyr Rybak, politician.
- Anatoliy Solovianenko, operatic tenor, People's Artist of the USSR, People's Artist of Ukraine, and Shevchenko National Prize winner.
- Petro Symonenko, politician.
- Serhiy Tulub, politician.
- Viktor Yanukovych, politician, fourth President of Ukraine.
- Mohammad Zahoor, businessman and philanthropist.
- Alexander Zasyadko, economic, state, and party leader.
- Yukhym Zvyahilsky, politician.

== Gallery ==
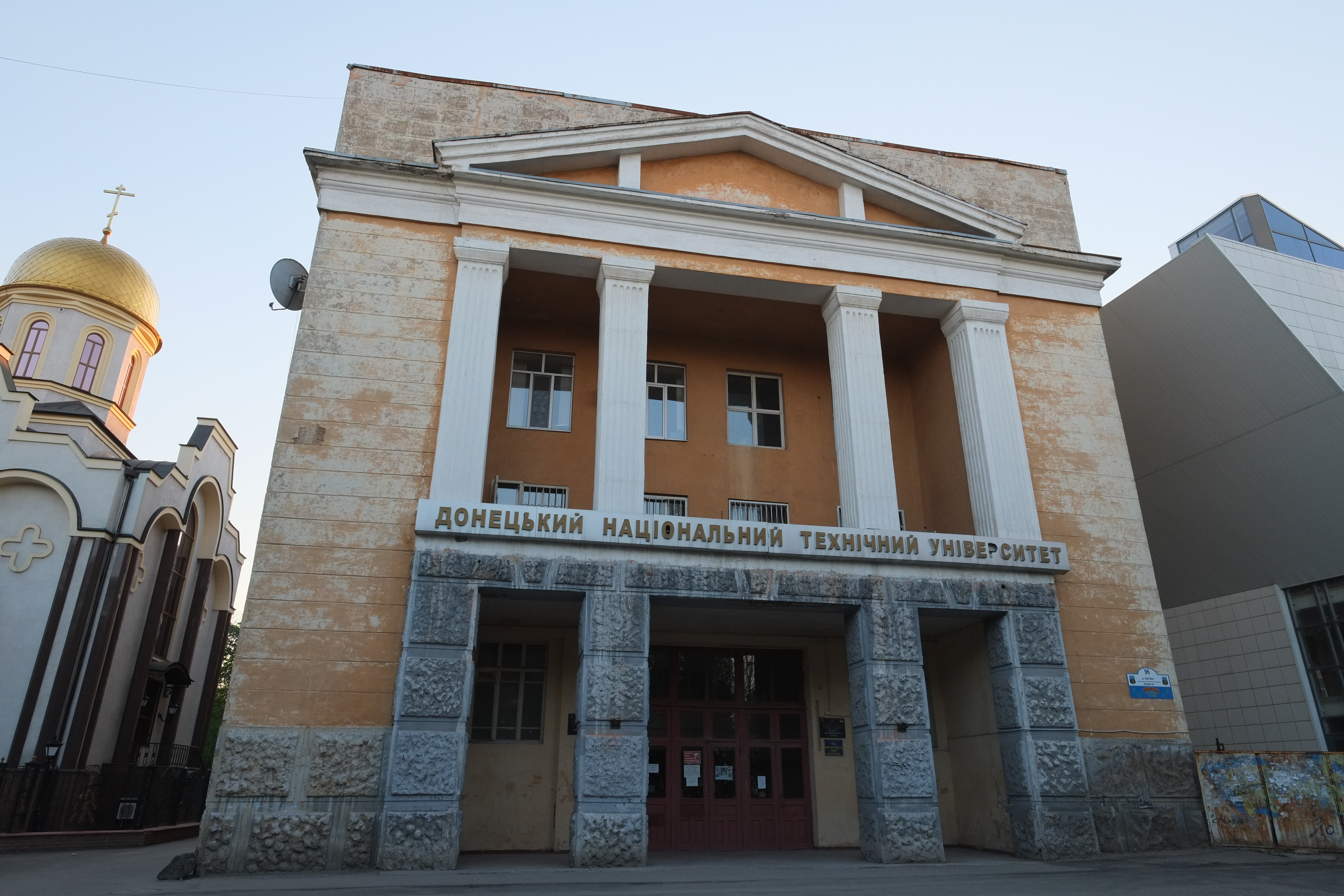
Faculty of Economics and Management. Placed in Artema avenue, the main avenue in Donetsk city.

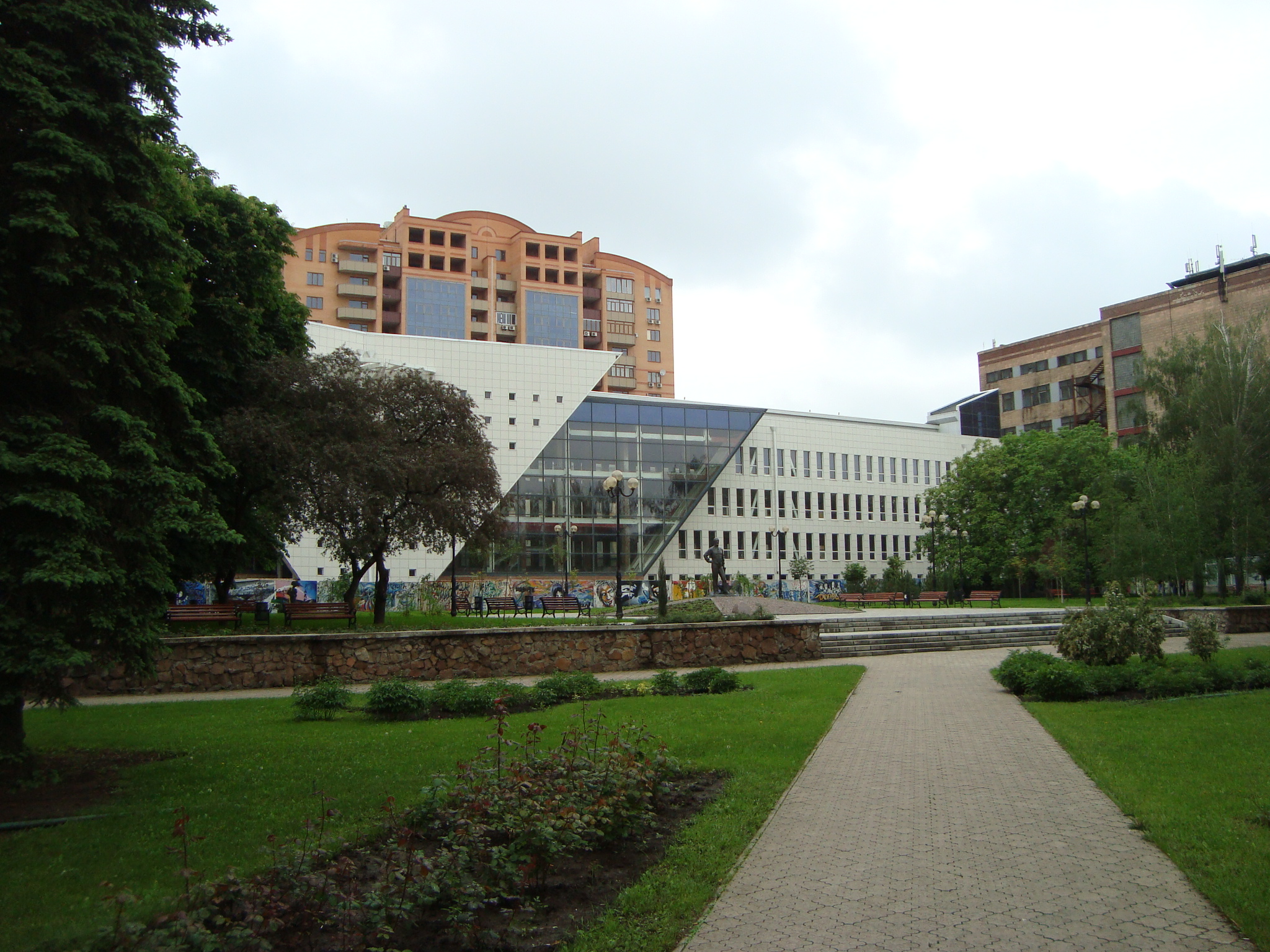
Library of Donetsk National Technical University. Placed beside the municipality of Donetsk.

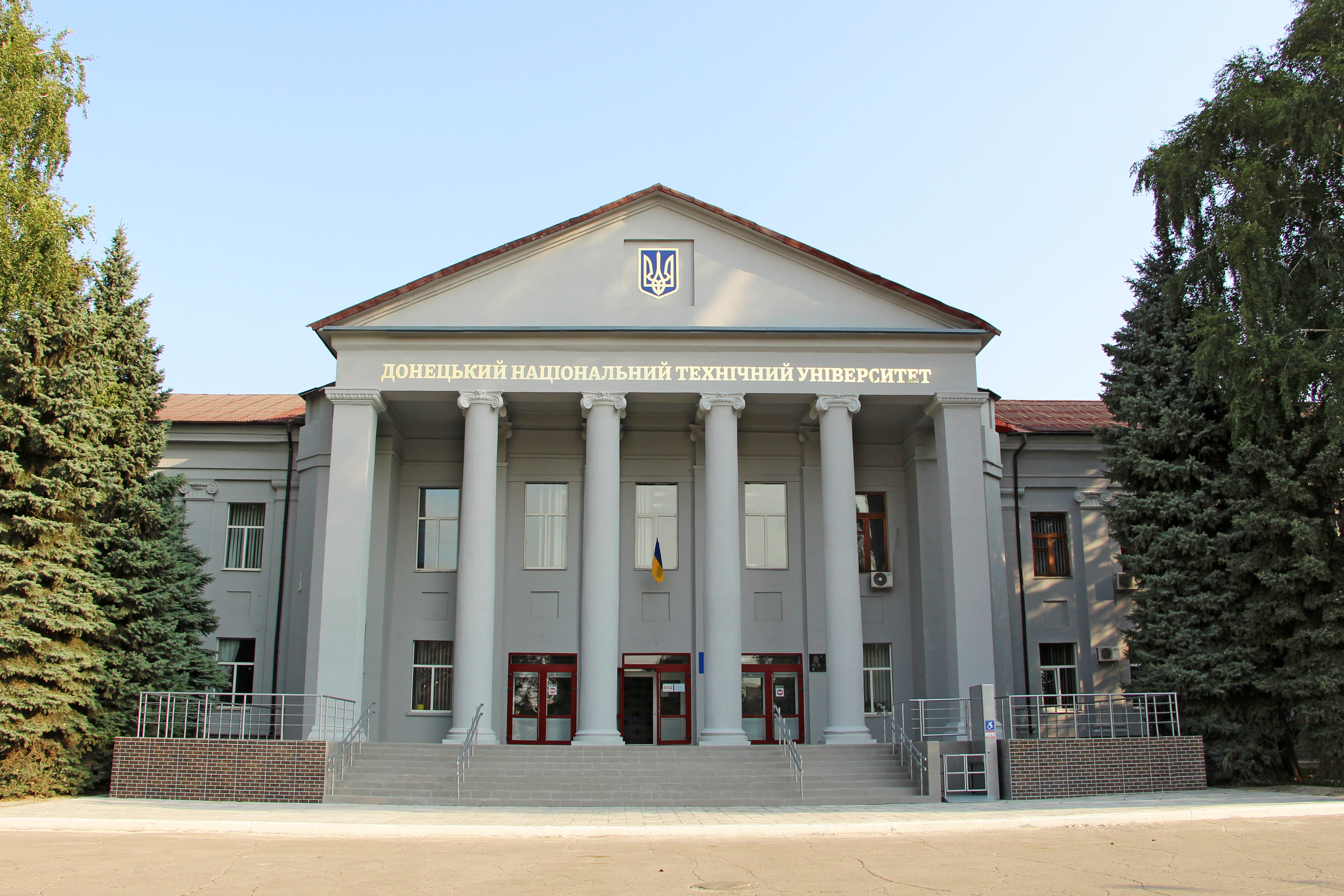
University building in Pokrovsk

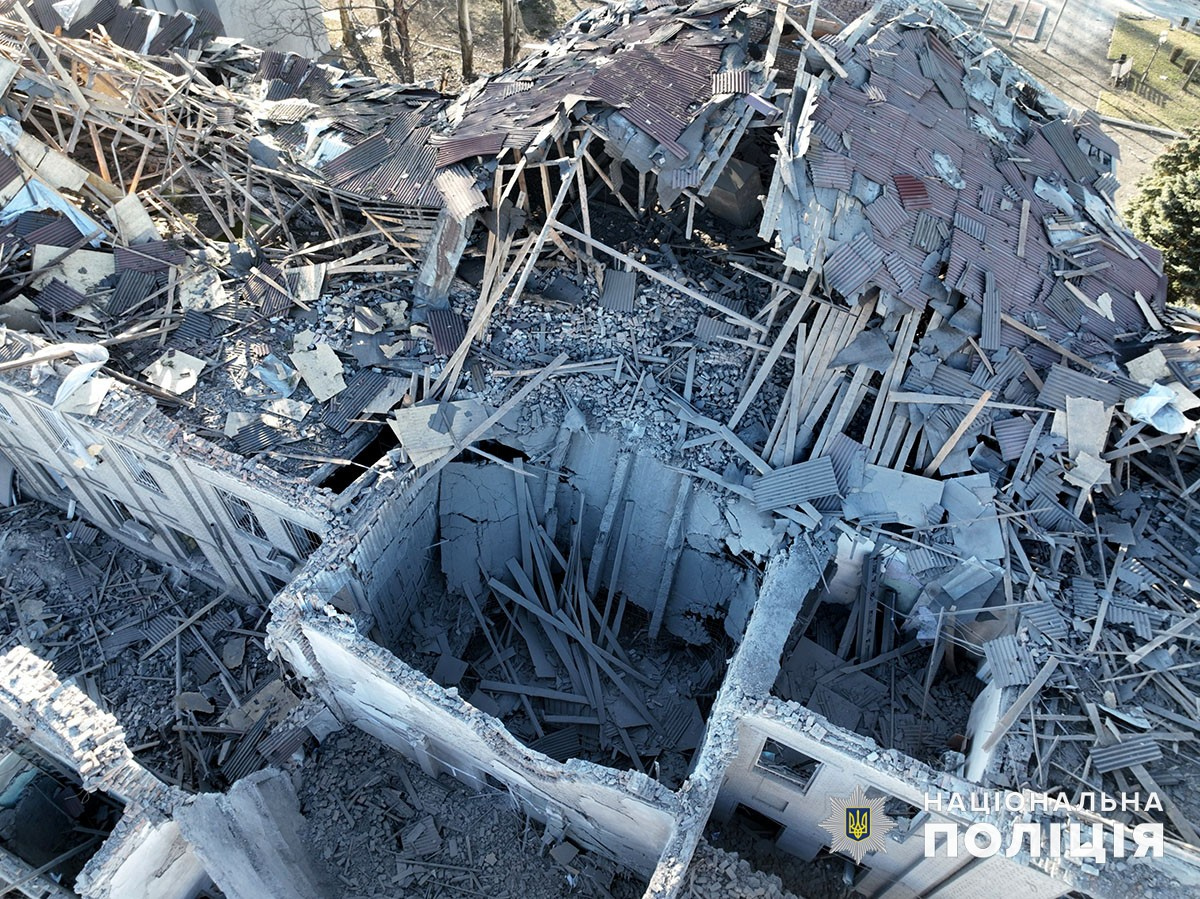
The building in Pokrovsk after Russian strike
