= Anatolii Solovianenko =

Ukrainian theatre director (born 1980)

Anatolii Solovianenko PAU, Shevchenko National Prize laureate
- Анатолій Анатолійович Солов'яненко
- Born: 27 April 1980 (age 46); Kyiv
- Education: Taras Shevchenko National University of Kyiv; Kyiv National University of Culture and Arts; National Music Academy of Ukraine
- Occupation: Theatre director
- Awards: Order of Prince Yaroslav the Wise; Order of Merit (Ukraine); Order of Honor (Georgia); Order of the Star of Italy; Shevchenko National Prize; People's Artist of Ukraine; Merited Functionary of Arts of Ukraine

Anatolii Solovianenko or Anatoliy Solovyanenko (Ukrainian: Анатолій Анатолійович Солов'яненко; born 27 April 1980, Kyiv) is a Ukrainian theatre director. People's Artist of Ukraine, laureate of the Shevchenko National Prize, chief director of the National Opera of Ukraine. Son of Anatoliy Solovianenko. Candidate of Arts, Professor. Academician of the National Academy of Arts of Ukraine.

== Biography ==
He was born into the family of Ukrainian singer Anatoliy Solovianenko.

He graduated from Taras Shevchenko National University of Kyiv (law, with honors), Kyiv National University of Culture and Arts (theater directing, class of Merited Figure of Arts of Ukraine, Professor V. P. Patsunov, with honors), National Music Academy of Ukraine (2005-2007, music directing, class of Merited Figure of Arts of Ukraine Volodymyr Behma, with honors).

From 2000 - assistant director, from 2001 - director, from 2003 - stage director, from 2011 - chief director of the National Opera of Ukraine.

Candidate of Arts, Professor. He is the author of scientific publications on the history and problems of opera-directing practice.

Academician (2025), corresponding member (2021) of the National Academy of Arts of Ukraine (2021).

Here's the English translation of the provided text:

== Creativity ==
He directed productions of the operas "Moses" by M. Skoryk, "Yaroslav Mudryi" by H. Maiboroda, "Norma" by V. Bellini, "La Traviata", "Don Carlos", "Nabucco" by G. Verdi, "Natalka Poltavka" by M. Lysenko, and "Zaporozhets за Dunaiem" by S. Hulak-Artemovskyi (both in a joint author's musical and stage adaptation, together with composer M. Skoryk), "Mozart and Salieri", "Tosca" by G. Puccini, "The Barber of Seville" by G. Rossini; he also staged the revival of the opera "Lucia di Lammermoor" by G. Donizetti, and "Pagliacci" by R. Leoncavallo.

Chief director of over 500 international and national cultural and artistic events, among which are the solemnities on the occasion of the opening of NSC "Olympic Stadium"; Constitution Days of Ukraine, Independence Days of Ukraine, Kyiv Days and Capital Days, Anniversaries of Taras Shevchenko's birthday, in various years; solemn openings of the Year of Georgia, the Year of the Republic of Poland, the Year of the Republic of Kazakhstan in Ukraine, festivals "Young Opera Stars of Ukraine", "Native Kalynova Language" and others.

In 2002-2006, he was the author and host of the National Television Company of Ukraine's series "Atrakt with Anatolii Solovianenko" dedicated to music and theater.

== Awards ==
- Merited Figure of Arts of Ukraine (2002)
- People's Artist of Ukraine (2008)
- Laureate of the Shevchenko National Prize (2011, for the production of Bellini's opera Norma at the National Opera of Ukraine)
- Order of Prince Yaroslav the Wise, 5th class (26 March 2018), 4th class (23 August 2021)
- Order of Merit 3rd class (2006), 2nd class (2010), 1st class (2015)
- Order of Honor
- Order of the Star of Italy (2015) for his significant personal contribution to the promotion of Italian culture in the world. Anatolii Solovianenko became the first Ukrainian director to receive this high honor from the country that is the birthplace of opera
- The title "Artist of the Year" (2017) in the national program "Person of the Year"
- Honorary Diploma of the Verkhovna Rada of Ukraine "For Special Services to the Ukrainian People"
- Diploma of the Verkhovna Rada of Ukraine "For Merit to the Ukrainian People"
- Honorary Diploma of the Cabinet of Ministers of Ukraine
- Merited Figure of Arts of Autonomous Republic of Crimea
- Diploma of the Prime Minister of Ukraine
- “Badge of Honor” (from the Mayor of Kyiv)
- Diploma and Certificate of Appreciation from the Mayor of Kyiv
- 2024 - Honorary Citizen of Kyiv.

== Bibliography ==
- "Солов'яненко Анатолій Анатолійович". Комітет з Національної премії України імені Тараса Шевченка.
