= Tavria TV =

Russian television channel

Programming
- Language: Russian

Links
- Website: tavria.tv

Tavria TV (Russian:Таврия ТВ) is a Russian television and radio company in Kherson Oblast that is one of the three largest Russian media outlets broadcasting in the Russian-occupied territories of Ukraine.

== History ==
Tavria TV was founded in 2022 after the temporary Russian occupation of Kherson Oblast by the Russian Armed Forces. The general director and creator of the channel was Yevgeny Prigozhin's associate and propagandist Alexander Malkevich.

In August 2022, it was reported that Ismail Abdullaiev, who previously headed the Oplot TV channel in the DPR, became the head of the channel.

In October 2022, the channel was evacuated from Kherson to Henichesk due to the retreat of Russian forces from the right bank of the Dnieper. On October 20, during the evacuation, many TV channel employees were injured when they came under fire. Of the 4 people killed during the shelling, at least two people were Tavria TV employees. Tavria TV later opened a studio in occupied Simferopol.
