= Oplot TV =

Russian language TV channel

- Country: Ukraine
- Headquarters: Donetsk, Ukraine

Programming
- Language: Russian
- Picture format: 576i SDTV; 1080i HDTV

History
- Launched: 8 August 2014

Links
- Website: oplottv.ru

Oplot TV (Russian: Оплот ТВ) is a television channel created in 2014 in the context of the Russo-Ukrainian war and the creation of the Donetsk People's Republic, currently one of the Russian-occupied territories of Ukraine. The channel specializes mainly in news and information content.

The name Oplot is taken from a separatist social movement, "Oplot of Donbas".

== History ==
Oplot TV started broadcasting on 8 August 2014. Until 2018, Ismail Abdullaiev was its director. The channel replaced Donbas TV and absorbed some of its senior technical staff, who were aiding Russian propaganda in the process. Abdullaiev restarted his television career in 2022 by creating Tavria TV.

Oplot was one of the channels hacked by Ukrainians on 22 August 2024 to air a video about the Russian invasion of Ukraine. The channel had to suspend its operations for a while.
