= Zhanulka =

Musical artist (born 2004)

Zhanulka Жанулка
- Born: April 20, 2004 (age 22); Donetsk, Ukraine
- Genres: Pop, Alternative Rock
- Occupations: Singer, songwriter, musician
- Instruments: Guitar, ukulele
- Years active: 2019–present
- Labels: Rite; Columbia

Zhanna Shatalova (born. April 20, 2004, Donetsk, Donetsk Oblast, Ukraine), better known by the pseudonym Zhanulka, is a Ukrainian singer, musician, and a songwriter.

== Biography ==
=== Youth ===
Shatalova was born in Donetsk and lived there until the age of 10. At the age of 13 she began to play ukulele. In 2014, her family moved to Kyiv, and in September 2018 they moved to Segovia, Spain, and later to Cullera. Shatalova made the film "Farewell, Valencia" (Прощай, Валенсия) about her life in Spain.

=== Music career ===
In Spain, Shatalova bought a guitar, and she started to record covers in GarageBand. She first became popular when her covers were published by some popular Instagram accounts, and 20,000 people followed her:

Zhanna: When I arrived in Spain and they bought me a cool guitar, I thought, that I could record covers. I did «Нервы», «Стрыкало» and a few more. They started to take off, and then suddenly in a month I was published by several Instagram accounts with millions of followers such as singer.ru. After this, 20,000 people followed me very quickly. Many, of course, quickly unsubscribed, but these were the first subscribers.

She published her first song "Huarachi" (Хуарачи) on SoundCloud. She also released her second song "Bite my Lips" (Кусай мои губы) on SoundCloud, after that, her followers increased to 2,000.

In the summer of 2019, Shatalova moved to Valencia.

In 2021, she released the song "kiskis" (кискис) which became popular on TikTok. On July 9, the mini-album "Valencia" (Валенсия) was released. Shatalova devoted the album to the time when she lived in Spain and was inspired by the people there. The album received a rating of 7.5 out of 10 stars from Russian critic Alexei Mazhaev. After the release of her mini-album, her first tour was announced. On November 5, 2021, her remastered album of old songs titled "call me what you want" (назови меня как хочешь) was released.

On January 29, 2022, a track with the rock group Papin Olimpos (Папин Олимпос) titled "Let's Try" (Давай Попробуем) was released. On February 4, she released the track "я любя." On July 1, after the invasion of Ukraine she released the song "portraits" (портреты) and on September 9 she released an acoustic version of the song.

== Discography ==
=== Mini-albums ===
Name	Details
and when will you arrive? (а когда вы приедете?)	Release: May 10, 2019; Format: Digital distribution
Spanish shame (испанский стыд)	Release: December 31, 2019; Format: Digital distribution
Valencia (Валенсия)	Release: July 9, 2021; Format: Digital distribution
call me what you want (назови меня как хочешь)	Release: November 5, 2021; Format: Digital distribution

=== Singles and other songs ===
Year	Name	Highest position in charts	
Year	Name	Shazam	Spotify
2019	Special for you (Спешл фор ю)		
2020	sworn enemy («заклятый враг)		
2021	kiskis (кискис)		39
2021	almost summer (почти лето) – remastered		
2021	you look like a cat (ты похож на кота) – remastered	12	
2022	Let's try (Давай попробуем)		
2022	«я любя»		
2022	portraits (портреты)		
2022	portraits (портреты) – Acoustic		
