= Diana Berg =

Ukrainian activist (born 1979)

- Діана Берг
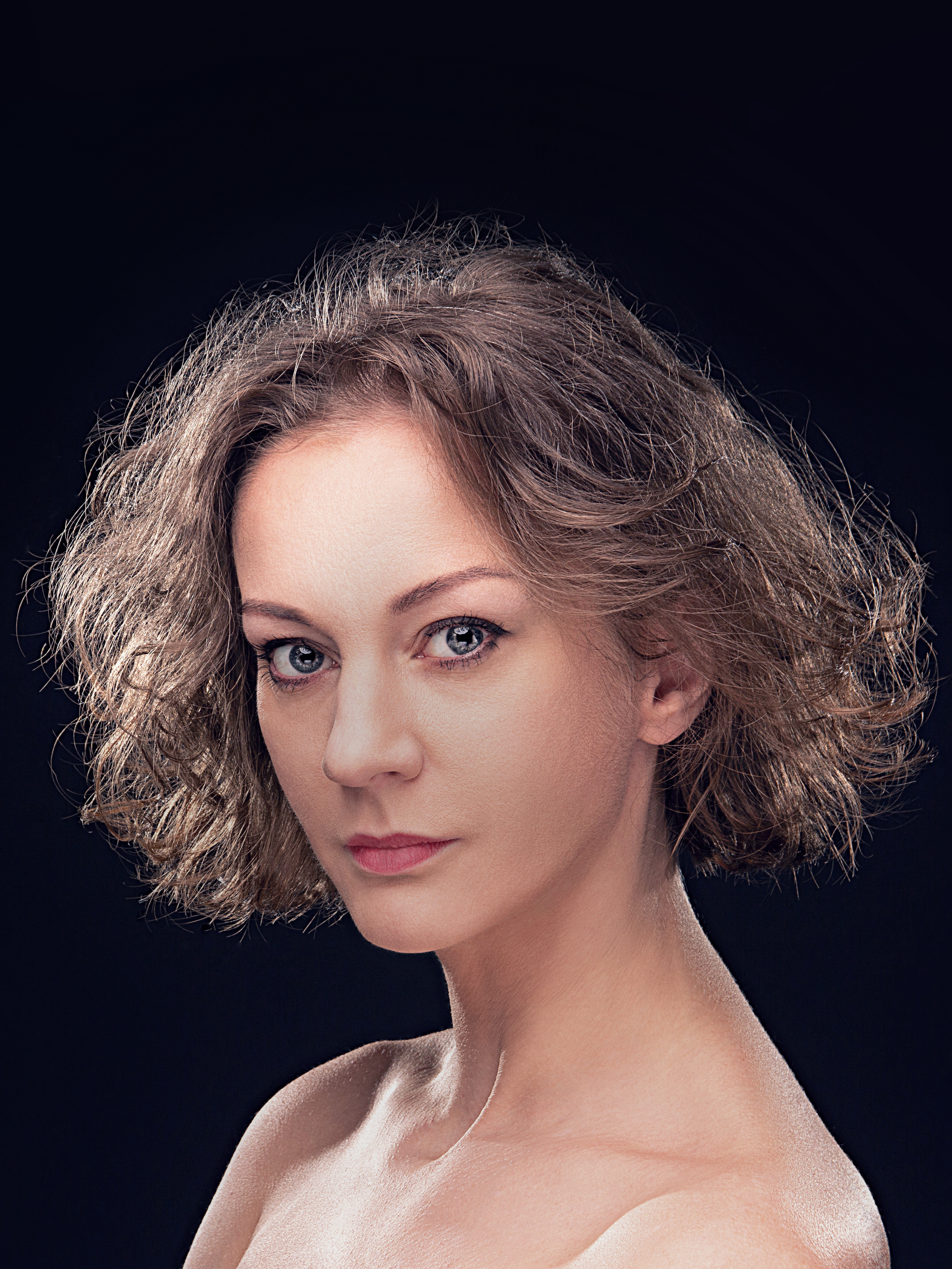
- Diana in 2019
- Born: 7 December 1979 (age 46); Donetsk, Ukrainian SSR, Soviet Union (now Ukraine)
- Education: Donetsk National Technical University
- Occupations: Activist and designer
- Organization(s): founder of platform Tu, and organizer of the "Donetsk is Ukraine" movement
- Website: Official website

Diana Olehivna Berg (Ukrainian: Діа́на Оле́гівна Берг; born 7 December 1979) is a Ukrainian activist from Donetsk who advocates for human rights. She started the Donetsk pro-Ukrainian movement in 2014 following the Euromaidan. The Platform Tu Space and Tu art-group, which is centered on the center of social changes and the promotion of human rights and freedoms via art and culture.

== Early life ==
Diana Berg was born and raised in Donetsk, Ukraine. She studied and worked there as a graphic designer and teacher.

She characterized herself as a typical creative young person disinterested in politics or social movements. However, her perspective shifted on 1 March 2014 when pro-Russian demonstrators gathered in Donetsk's Lenin Square. Taking the lead with her friend Katya, they organized the city's first large-scale rallies, enlisting experts in protest planning to assist them. She obtained a degree in foreign economic activity from Donetsk National Technical University in 2001.

She fled Donetsk when pro-Russian rebels took over, traveling to Odesa before continuing on to Lviv and Kyiv. Diana later relocated to front-line Mariupol after deciding she wanted to be nearer to her hometown and help the pro-Ukrainian fight in Donbas in 2014. She was again forced to flee her home for the second time eight years later when Russia invaded Ukraine in 2022. In the spring of 2014, she became an activist and started a pro-Ukrainian campaign in her hometown. She had to leave her captured village and made her home in Mariupol.

== Career ==
Diana established the Mariupol-based art platform Tu in 2016 and is currently running it from abroad. She established a platform advocating for social transformation and cultural advancement to support human rights and freedoms, addressing issues like gender inequality, discrimination, and ultra-right radicalism. Notably, as the only grassroots movement in eastern Ukraine, she promotes modern arts and underground culture alongside her broader social initiatives.

On 12 June 2016, she entered Mariupol's center and participated in a military parade honouring the city's second anniversary of liberation from Donetsk People's Republic rebels. She wore the LGBT community's rainbow flag, which had the Ukrainian flag stitched to it. There was only one protest in favor of the "March of Equality" that took place in Kyiv.

Diana Berg directed Platform Tu space and the Tu art-group for six years, overseeing their work in protecting rights. After fleeing from Russian-occupied Mariupol in March 2022 to Kyiv, she adapted operations to the wartime situation, and despite facing a second total loss, Platform Tu continues to provide humanitarian aid, evacuate individuals from occupied areas, fundraise for refugees, and safeguard museums at risk.

Diana coordinated the only Ukrainian program in Kassel during Documenta. Additionally, she co-organized Berlin Pride's Ukrainian column, which is where she coined the slogan "Arm Ukraine now, make pride in Mariupol possible." Tu is carrying out her cultural initiative as well. The Platform Tu team is now working on the "Memoriupol" online homage to Mariupol culture.

She claimed in a 2021 article that when traditional forms of protest fail, one must become creative, and she is certain of this. Diana discussed her transformation from a subservient woman to the leader of creative protest and her desire to stop offending audiences with Zaborona journalist Alyona Vyshnytska.

In August 2025, during the funeral of Ukrainian serviceman David Chichkan, Berg witnessed and later confirmed that Denis Kapustin, the leader of the Russian Volunteer Corps, had assaulted Ukrainian war veteran Viktor Pylypenko for carrying an LGBT flag to the ceremony.
