= Anyuta Slavskaya =

Ukrainian-Russian singer (born 1983)

Anyuta Slavskaya Анюта Славская
- Born: 11 November 1983 (age 41); Donetsk, Ukraine
- Genres: pop, dance,
- Occupation(s): Singer, tv-host
- Instrument: Vocals
- Years active: 2002–present
- Labels: Perpetuum Music, RDS Records
- Website: slavskaya.net

Anyuta Slavskaya, also known as Anyuta (Russian: Анюта Славская), Ukrainian: Анюта Славська); born 11 November 1983, is a Ukrainian-Russian singer and TV presenter.

== Career ==
Anyuta was born in Donetsk in the Eastern Ukraine). During her school career she established herself as a performer.

She toured with a folk group with a wide repertoire of Kuban, Cossack, Ukrainian, Russian and Gypsy folk songs. After graduating from college (2002), specializing as a choir-leader and in the teaching of singing, she was already beginning to establish herself as a multi-genre artist.

She enrolled at the State Academy of Culture and Arts in Kyiv on a course specialising in the direction of public events, but soon decided to cultivate her career as a singer. She won the "Discovery of the Year 2002" award at "The Best Songs of the Year" international festival, also taking part in the Russian-Ukrainian TV show "Song of 2003" and at the anniversary concert of the Moskovsky Komsomolets newspaper at the Luzhniki Stadium. She also took part in the 2004 "Walk in the Clouds" show and fashion collection.

== Style ==
Anyuta took inspiration from the Serbian film director Emir Kusturica by including Slavic motifs in modern musical arrangements based on the French chanson singing style. She uses national language and costumes as themes for songs.

== Discography ==
- Red-haired Angel" / "Рыжий Ангел (2004)
- Takeoff" / "Отрываясь от Земли (2014)
