= Fyodor Berezin =

Russian science fiction writer (born 1960)

- Фёдор Березин
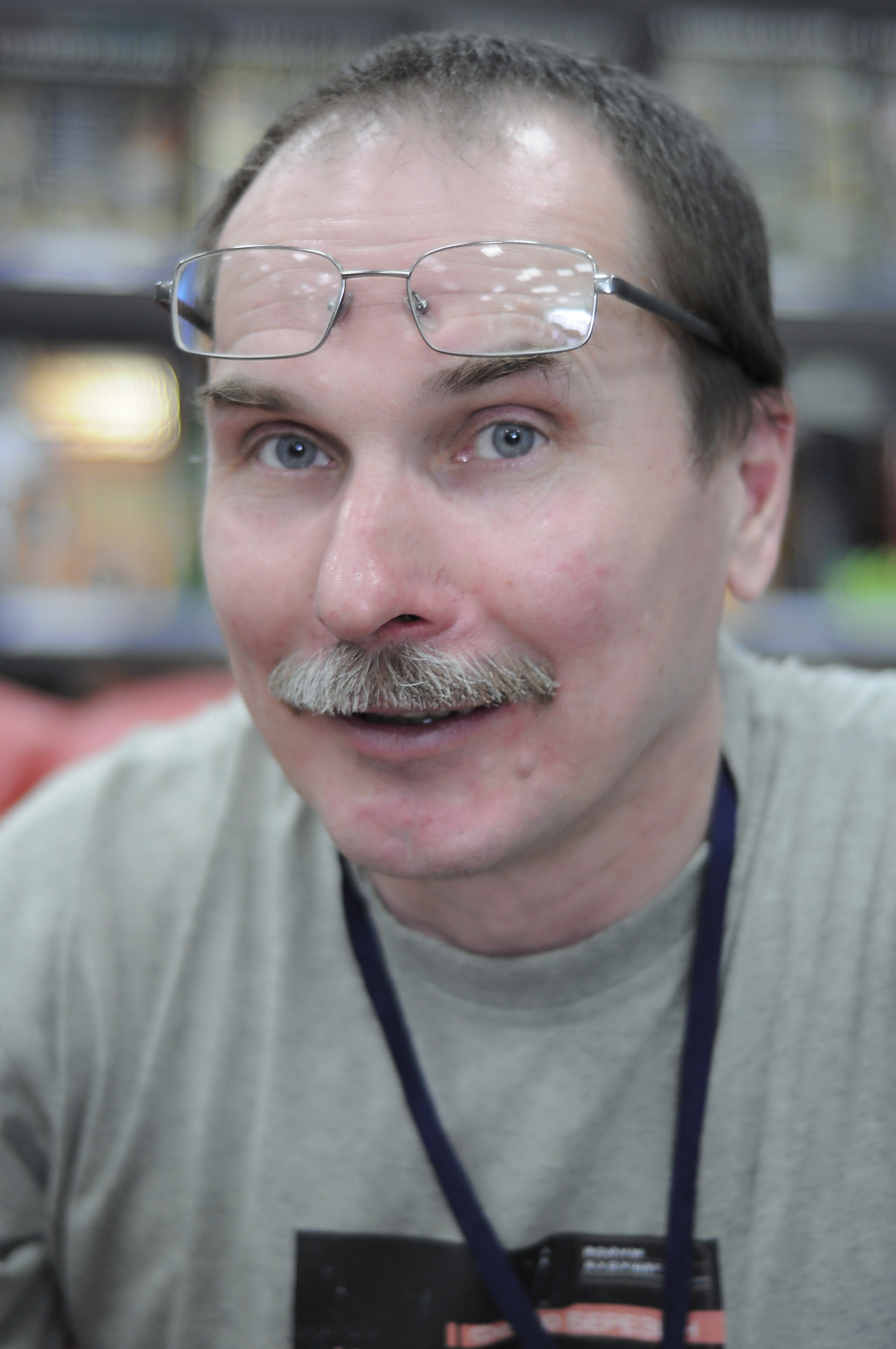
- Berezin in 2011
- Born: Fedir Dmytrovych Berezin; February 7, 1960 (age 66); Stalino, Ukrainian SSR, Soviet Union
- Occupation: Novelist
- Writing career
- Genre: Science fiction
- Military career
- Allegiance: Soviet Union; Donetsk People's Republic
- Branch: Soviet Army; Donbass People's Militia
- Service years: 1981–1991 (Soviet Army), 2014–
- Rank: Captain
- Conflicts: Russo-Ukrainian War
- Website: strannik.org.ua

Fyodor Dmitrievich Berezin (Russian: Фёдор Дмитриевич Березин; Ukrainian: Федір Дмитрович Березін, romanized: Fedir Dmytrovych Berezin; born February 7, 1960) is a science fiction writer and politician. He has published 3 novel series, and 2 separate works, scoring him awards at the International Science Fiction Festival.

He has been an active supporter of the Donetsk People's Republic, where he was Deputy Minister of Defense in 2014. He is included in sanctions lists in European Union countries and Ukraine, among others.

== Biography ==
Fyodor Berezin was born Fedir Berezin in Stalino (now Donetsk) on 7 February 1960. He lived there until 1977 when he entered the Engels anti-aircraft training school. He graduated in 1981 and served as an AA officer first in Kazakhstan and then in the Far East.

In 1991, Berezin left the military at the rank of captain and currently lives in his hometown of Donetsk. He has worked as an entrepreneur and tried a multitude of different career fields such as mine construction. Married, he has a son and a daughter.

Berezin has been a professional writer since 1998. He is also the founder and chairman of "Strannik" (English: Wanderer), the Donetsk science fiction club.

Berezin's novels work within the boundaries of hard science fiction and are labeled by some critics as "turborealist". He calls his style of writing "science-fictional/philosophical technothriller". Berezin published his first novel, the science-fiction novel Ash (Russian: Пепел), in 2001. He recognizes the influence of H. G. Wells, Kurt Vonnegut, Stanislaw Lem and Arkady and Boris Strugatsky in his work.

=== Sanctions ===
He is sanctioned by the British government in 2014 in relation to the Russo-Ukrainian War.

== Politics ==
During the war in Donbas, he served as the Deputy Minister of Defense of the pro-Russian separatist region of the Donetsk People's Republic in 2014. In November 2014, he led an armed seizure of the Donetsk branch of the Writer's Union of Ukraine, declaring the establishment of a new union of writers of the DPR.

== Novels ==
- Separate works:
  - Ash
  - The Lunar Option (Russian: Лунный вариант)
- Series:
  - The Black Ship (Russian: Чёрный корабль)
    - The Huge Black Ship (Russian: Огромный чёрный корабль)
    - The Crew of the Black Ship (Russian: Экипаж чёрного корабля)
    - The Creator of the Black Ship (Russian: Создатель чёрного корабля)
  - Red Stars (Russian: Красные звёзды)
    - Incoming Cataclysm (Russian: Встречный катаклизм)
    - Parallel Cataclysm (Russian: Параллельный катаклизм)
  - War 2030 (Russian: Война 2030)
    - Red Dawn (Russian: Красный рассвет)
    - Metropolis on Fire (Russian: Пожар метрополии)
    - Attack on the Rocky Mountains (Russian: Атака Скалистых гор)

== Awards ==
- 1st place – Golden Caduceus – International Science Fiction Festival "the Golden Bridge" in Kharkiv; nominated for the "Best Debut" award for the novel Ash (2001).
- 2nd place – Silver Caduceus – nominated for the "Series and Novels with Sequels" award for the novels Incoming Cataclysm and Parallel Cataclysm (2002).
- 3rd place – Bronze Caduceus – nominated for the "Series and Novels with Sequels" award for the novels War 2030: Red Dawn and War 2030: Metropolis on Fire (2005).
- 3rd place – Bronze Caduceus – nominated for the "Series and Novels with Sequels" award for the novel War 2030: Attack on the Rocky Mountains.
