= Ismail Abdullaiev =

Ukrainian and Russian television director

- Исмаил Абдуллаев
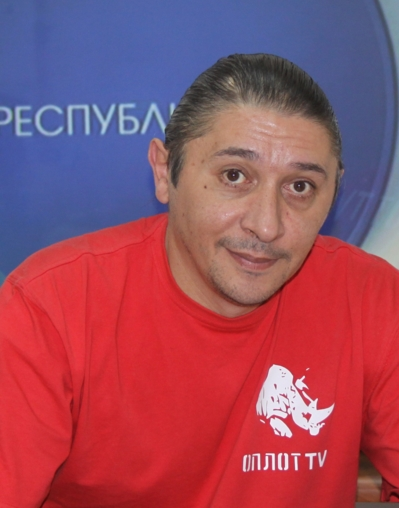
- Abdullaiev in 2015
- Born: May 23, 1966 (age 60); Donetsk, Donetsk Oblast, Ukrainian SSR, Soviet Union
- Other name: Vladimir Abdullaev
- Education: Donetsk Polytechnic Institute
- Occupation: Television director
- Television: Tavria TV; Oplot TV

Ismail Adaliatovych Abdullaiev (Note: Ukrainian: Ісмаїл Адалятович Абдуллаєв; Russian: Исмаил Адалятович Абдуллаев, romanized: Ismail Adalyatovich Abdullaev; Azerbaijani: İsmayıl Ədalət oğlu Abdullayev) (born 23 May 1966), also known under the pseudonym Vladimir Abdullaev (Russian: Владимир Абдуллаев), is a Russian citizen from Donetsk Oblast, currently operating as the director of the pro-Russian broadcasting company Tavria TV, and formerly the director of Oplot TV until 2018. He has been sanctioned by the Ukrainian government since October 2022, and is also included in the Myrotvorets and Chesno databases of traitors to the Ukrainian state. In June 2023, he was served with a notice of suspicion by the Security Service of Ukraine.

== Early life ==
Ismail Adaliatovych Abdullaiev was born on 23 May 1966 in the city of Donetsk, then part of the Ukrainian Soviet Socialist Republic.

He gained his education in chemical engineering at the Donetsk Polytechnic Institute. From 1987 to 1996, during his time studying as a student there, he represented the university as a member of the Donetsk Polytechnic Institute team in the Soviet KVN game show.

Ismail Abullaiev's first experience in directing Television came with his position as director of the now-defunct Bordiur production company, which was registered by him on 24 June 1998.

== Separatist activities ==
Following the beginning of the Russo-Ukrainian War in 2014, he began to advocate for the independence of the Donetsk People's Republic. Despite this, he was reportedly seen by some members of the Ukrainian government, particularly Serhii Syvokho, as one of the more reasonable figures on the separatist side, and as one with whom political dialogue could be engaged.

After the seizure of the technical facilities of the First Municipal Channel in 2014, Ismail Abdullaiev took up the role of creating Oplot TV as the new regional channel of the Donetsk region off of its basis. He crafted a deal with Donetsk separatist leader Oleksandr Zakharchenko to present Zakharchenko's interviews on Oplot TV exclusively. Additionally, he made a personal agreement with pro-Russian Ukrainian journalist Anatolii Sharii to have Sharii's videos be broadcast on the television channel.

In 2018, following the death of Oleksandr Zakharchenko in August of that year, Oplot TV was placed under the authority of the Ministry of Information of the Donetsk People's Republic, with Ismail Abullaiev no longer functioning as its director.

=== 2022 Russian invasion of Ukraine ===
His services once again came into prominence following the Russian occupation of large parts of Kherson oblast, and a desire of the Russian state to set up collaborationist media authorities in the region. After the seizure of the technical facilities of Suspilne Kherson, Ismail Abdullaiev was officially appointed director of the newly established broadcasting company Tavria TV on 11 August 2022. The process of its establishment also involved help from the authorities of Kaliningrad oblast of Russia, with Kaliningrad governor Anton Alikhanov, Sergey Eliseev, and Ismail Abdullaiev all cutting the ribbon to introduce the channel together. The television channel was thereafter heavily praised by local collaborator Kyrylo Stremousov.

Since assuming his position as the director of Tavria TV, Ismail Abdullaiev has begun to use the pseudonym Vladimir Abdullaev in all official settings.

In August 2022, Tavria TV was involved in the creation of a media school on the campus of Kherson State University, with Ismail Abdullaiev lecturing there in person and being involved in its organization. The purpose of the media school was to train pro-Russian locals of Kherson in journalism and then hire them as staff for Tavria TV. Several months later, in November 2022, it was revealed that a number of people who had passed the course of the media school had been hired to work under Abdullaiev, both as video editors and cameramen.

Since 19 October 2022, by presidential decree, he has been included in the sanctions list of the National Security and Defense Council of Ukraine.

On 21 October 2022, Ismail Abullaiev claimed Tavria TV reporters to have been targeted by a Ukrainian M142 HIMARS rocket system strike while crossing the Antonivskyi Bridge, alleging that two of his colleagues from Tavria TV were killed as a result. He was reportedly nearby, but not on the bridge at the time, and thus not injured.

Following the liberation of Kherson on 9 November 2022, Tavria TV ceased operations temporarily, until the television station could be relocated. On 21 November, Tavria TV restarted operations from the city of Henichesk, with Abdullaiev continuing as its director.

The Security Service of Ukraine served Ismail Abdullaiev with a notice of suspicion on 8 June 2023.

== Personal life ==
Ismail Abullaiev has a wife by the name of Hanna Ivanivna Abullaieva, who his Bordiur production company was partially registered in the name of. He also has a son named Volodymyr Ismailovych Abdullaiev, who is a member of the youth parliament of the Donetsk People's Republic and helps his father in many of his projects.

Following the beginning of the Russo-Ukrainian war in 2014, Ismail Abdullaiev applied for and was granted Russian citizenship.
