= Anatoliy Solovianenko =

Ukrainian operatic tenor

Hero of Ukraine People's Artist Anatoliy Solovianenko
- Анатолій Солов'яненко
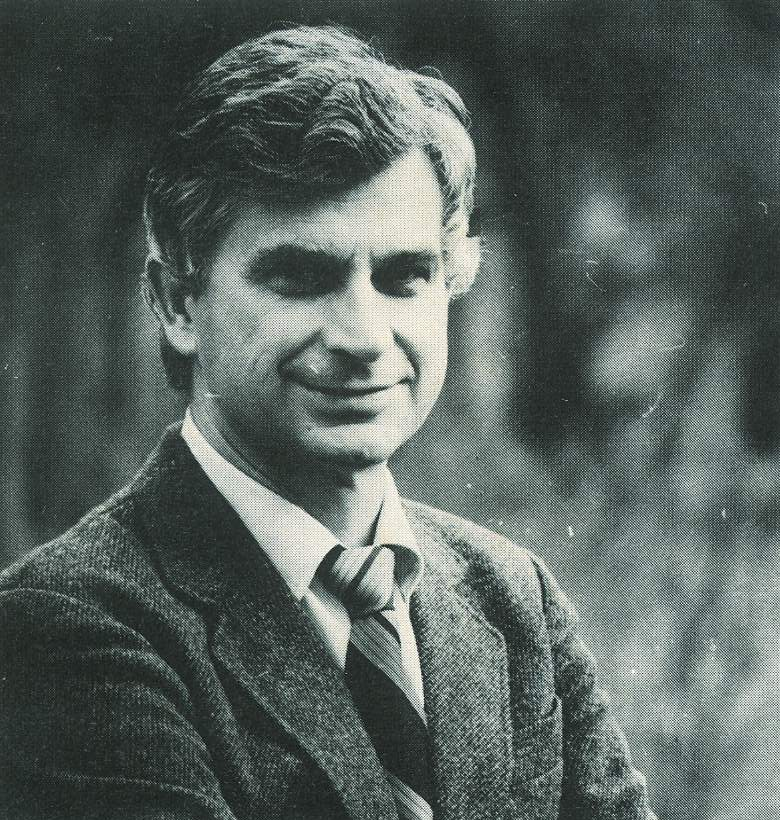
- Solovianenko, circa 1984
- Born: 25 September 1932; Donetsk, Ukrainian SSR, Soviet Union
- Died: 29 July 1999 (aged 66); Kozyn, Ukraine
- Occupation: Opera singer (tenor)
- Awards: People's Artist of the USSR (1975); People's Artist of Ukraine; Lenin Prize; Hero of Ukraine

Anatoliy Borysovych Solovianenko (Note: sometimes transliterated as Anatolii and Solovyanenko) (Ukrainian: Анатолій Борисович Солов'яненко; Russian: Анатолий Борисович Соловья́ненко; (Note: romanized: Anatoly Borisovich Solovyanenko) 25 September 1932 – 29 July 1999) was a Ukrainian operatic tenor, People's Artist of the USSR (1975), People's Artist of Ukraine, and Shevchenko National Prize winner. Father of Anatolii Solovianenko.

He was born into a mining family in Donetsk and graduated from Donetsk Polytechnic Institute in 1954. He also studied singing with Alexander Korobeichenko from 1950. Solovianenko began his career in Donetsk, where there is now a monument in his memory. He made twelve performances at the Metropolitan Opera in Kyiv, then graduated from Kyiv Conservatory in 1978. For 30 years, he was soloist at the Taras Shevchenko National Opera and Ballet Theatre in Kyiv, and performed at Expo 67 in Montreal. During the 1977–78 season, Solovianenko performed as a soloist at the New York Metropolitan Opera. He also performed as soloist for the Alexandrov Ensemble during its UK tour 1988, singing "Kalinka" and other songs. He recorded 18 LPs of arias, romances and songs.

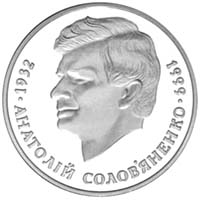
Memorial coin issued by National Bank of Ukraine

== Life and career ==
Anatoliy Solovianenko was born in Donetsk (Stalino at that time) on 25 September 1932 into a miner's family. In 1954, he graduated from Donetsk Technical University, after which he taught there in the engineering graphics department.

He began taking singing lessons in 1950 from Alexander Korobeychenko, Honoured Artist of the Russian Soviet Republic. Success in a popular talent show of 1962 led to an invitation to sing at the National Opera of Ukraine. But before starting work in the National Opera, Solovyanenko won the young singers' contest at Milan's La Scala, and studied there for three years (1963–1965). He became the first Soviet singer to receive an invitation to perform at New York's Metropolitan Opera. Starting from 1965, Solovyanenko performed with the National Opera of Ukraine. In 1967, he was awarded the rank of Honoured Artist of Ukraine, and in 1975, the rank of People's Artist of the USSR.

He graduated from the Kyiv Conservatory in 1978. Being the soloist of the National Opera, Anatoliy Solovyanenko sang 18 parts, among them: Duke (Rigoletto), Alfredo (La Traviata), Tenor (Requiem), Edgardo (Lucia di Lammermoor), Rodolfo (La Boheme), Kavarosen (Tosca), Faust (Faust), Lenskiy (Yevgeniy Onegin), Pretender (Boris Godunov), Andriy (Zaporozhec across the Danube) and many others. Anatoliy Solovyanenko was married and had two sons, Andrii and Anatoliy.

Anatoliy Solovyanenko died suddenly from a heart attack on 29 July 1999. Among various government officials who attended his funeral was President Leonid Kuchma, and several months later, in December 1999, the Donetsk State Academic Opera and Ballet Theatre was renamed in his honor by the Ukrainian Cabinet. In 2001, a statue of the singer was installed at Kozyn (within the Kyiv Oblast), where he is buried.

== Awards ==
- 1967 – Honoured Artist of Ukraine
- 1975 – People's Artist of the USSR
- 1980 – Lenin Prize, money prize was transferred by A.Solovyanenko to the Peace Committee
- 1982 – Miner's Glory Medal, Order of Friendship of Peoples
- 1993 – Badge of Honour from President of Ukraine
- 1997 – Taras Shevchenko National Prize

== Recognition ==
- Donetsk Opera and Ballet Theater was named in honor of Anatoly Solovyanenko. The monument to him was installed near the theatre.
- Another monument was installed in Kyiv at 16 Institutska Street; the house is marked by a memorial plaque.
- A musical named "Vyzov Sud'be" (eng. – Defy the odds) featuring A. Solovyanenko was filmed at the Dovzhenko Film Studios
- In 1982, a book by A.K. Tereshchenko "A. Solovyanenko" was published, and reprinted in 1988.
