= Oleksiy Matsuka =

Ukrainian journalist

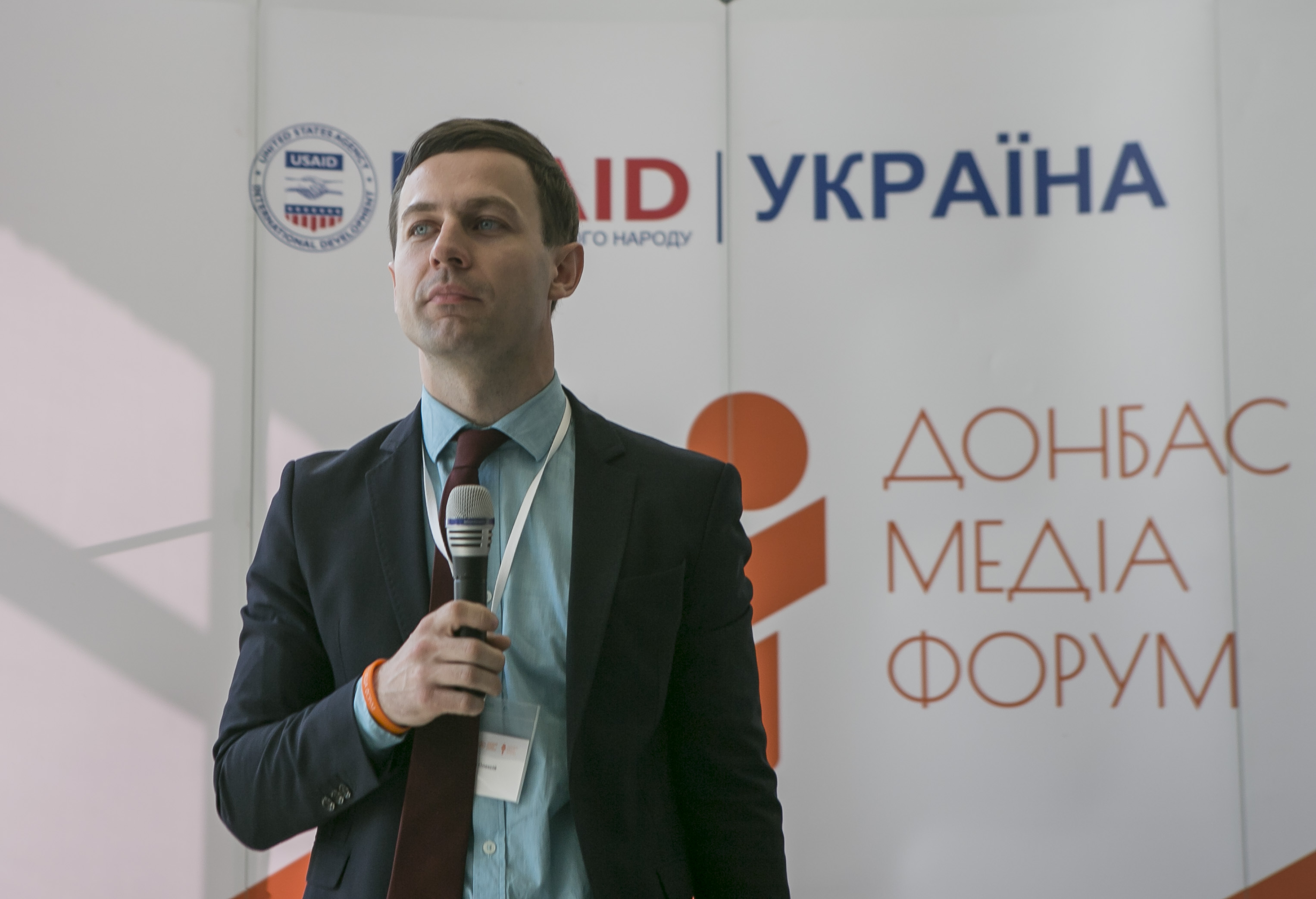
- Matsuka in 2015
- Born: 15 January 1983 (age 43); Donetsk, Ukrainian SSR, Soviet Union
- Other name: Alexei Matsuka (Russian)
- Education: Donetsk National University of Economics and Trade
- Occupation: journalist
- Known for: corruption reporting

Oleksiy Vitaliyovych Matsuka (Ukrainian: Олексі́й Віта́лійович Мацу́ка, born 15 January 1983) is a Ukrainian journalist. He is the editor-in-chief of Novosti Donbassa, a Donbas news website. In 2013, he launched Donetskaya Pravda, which focuses on investigating public officials. He has also reported on Donetsk for Hromadske.TV and for Radio Free Europe/Radio Liberty's Ukrainian Service.

In 2011, Matsuka's apartment was set on fire after he published a series of articles on the embezzlement of public funds. In April 2014, his car was set on fire after he wrote an article titled "Russia's deep ties to Donetsk's Kremlin collaborators."

== Honors and awards ==
In April 2014, Reporters Without Borders named Matsuka in its list of 100 Information Heroes. In December 2014, the Canadian Journalists for Free Expression presented him with its International Press Freedom Award.
