= Alexander Anoprienko =

Ukrainian computer engineer and academic

Alexander Yakovlevich Anoprienko
- Ukrainian: Олександр Якович Анопрієнко
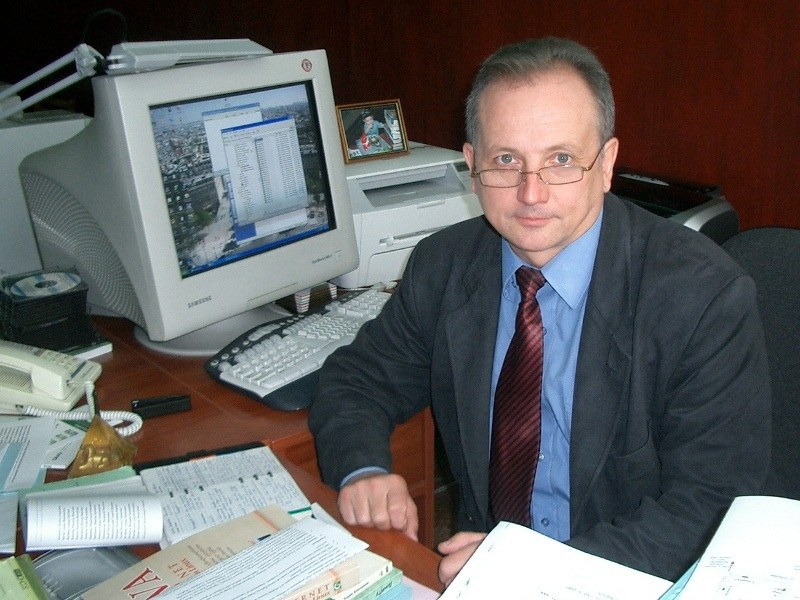
- Born: 21 September 1957 (age 68); Stalino, Soviet Union
- Education: Donetsk National Technical University

Alexander Anoprienko (Ukrainian: Олександр Якович Анопрієнко, lit. 'Oleksandr Yakovych Anopriyenko') is a Ukrainian and Russian Professor of the Computer Engineering Department of the Donetsk National Technical University (DonNTU). He also holds the position of the Director of the DonNTU Competence Center as well as the Director of the DonNTU UNITECH Technological Park. Since October 2014 he has held the position of the provisional Rector of DonNTU.

He is also a member of the Ukrainian Academy of Engineering Sciences, providing an expertise in computer systems and technologies, internet-based technologies, computer modeling and simulation as well as computing history. He contributes as author and administrator to the Ukrainian Research and Academic Network URAN (e.g., serving the DonNTU Master’s Portal).

Anoprienko was born 21 September 1957 in Stalino (the former name of Donetsk before 1961, being a part of USSR). After finishing secondary school No.76 in Donetsk in 1974, he began a study at the Donetsk Polytechnic University (presently DonNTU), in the Department of Electronic Computing Machines (ECM). After graduating DonNTU, he joined the ECM department as a teaching and research assistant During 1989-90, he completed a 10-months internship at the High Performance Computing Center, Stuttgart (Germany), funded by a German Academic Exchange Service (DAAD) grant.

In 2000, he became the coordinator of the DonNTU Technology Park. The park is known for projects like “Donetsk: 1000 images”, which became one of the first Ukrainian projects of such kind, and also an info-website “Gifted Generation”, dedicated to the issues of seeking and supporting gifted and talented children.
