= Donetsk Sea =

Lake in Donetsk, Ukraine

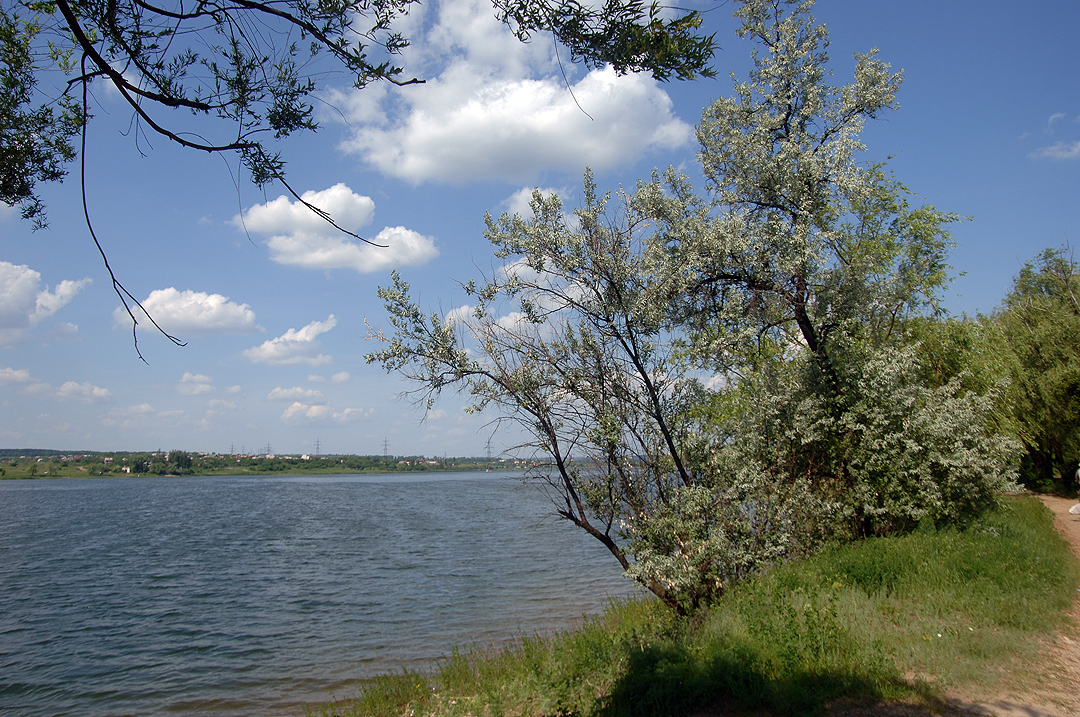
- Panoramic view of the sea
- Location: Donetsk, Ukraine
- Coordinates: 47°55′44″N 37°47′56″E
- Surface area: 206 hectares (510 acres)
- Average depth: 17 metres (56 ft)
- Water volume: 7 cubic kilometres (1.7 cu mi)

The Donetsk Sea (Ukrainian: Донецьке море, romanized: Donetske more), or Sea of Donetsk, is a reservoir in the southern part of the Ukrainian city of Donetsk. The surface area of the sea is about 206 hectares (510 acres), and with a depth of 17 metres (56 ft), the total volume is about 7 cubic kilometres (1.7 cu mi). This reservoir was created along the Shyroka river.

== Geography ==
There is a natural reserve area near the Donetsk Sea, which is suitable for recreation. However, the sea has been drying up in recent years due to decreased rainfall. It was reported that the water level has fallen by about 4 metres (13 ft). The banks receded by 20–30 metres (66–98 ft).

Up until today, the Donetsk Sea has never been cleaned of silt, and there remain some deposits at the bottom of the sea. Also, there has been an abnormally high amount of E. coli in the sea's water; the level has been 10 times the normal amount since 2010. This is why specialists prohibit residents from swimming or bathing in it to prevent infections.
