= Viktor Yanukovych =

President of Ukraine from 2010 to 2014

- Віктор Янукович
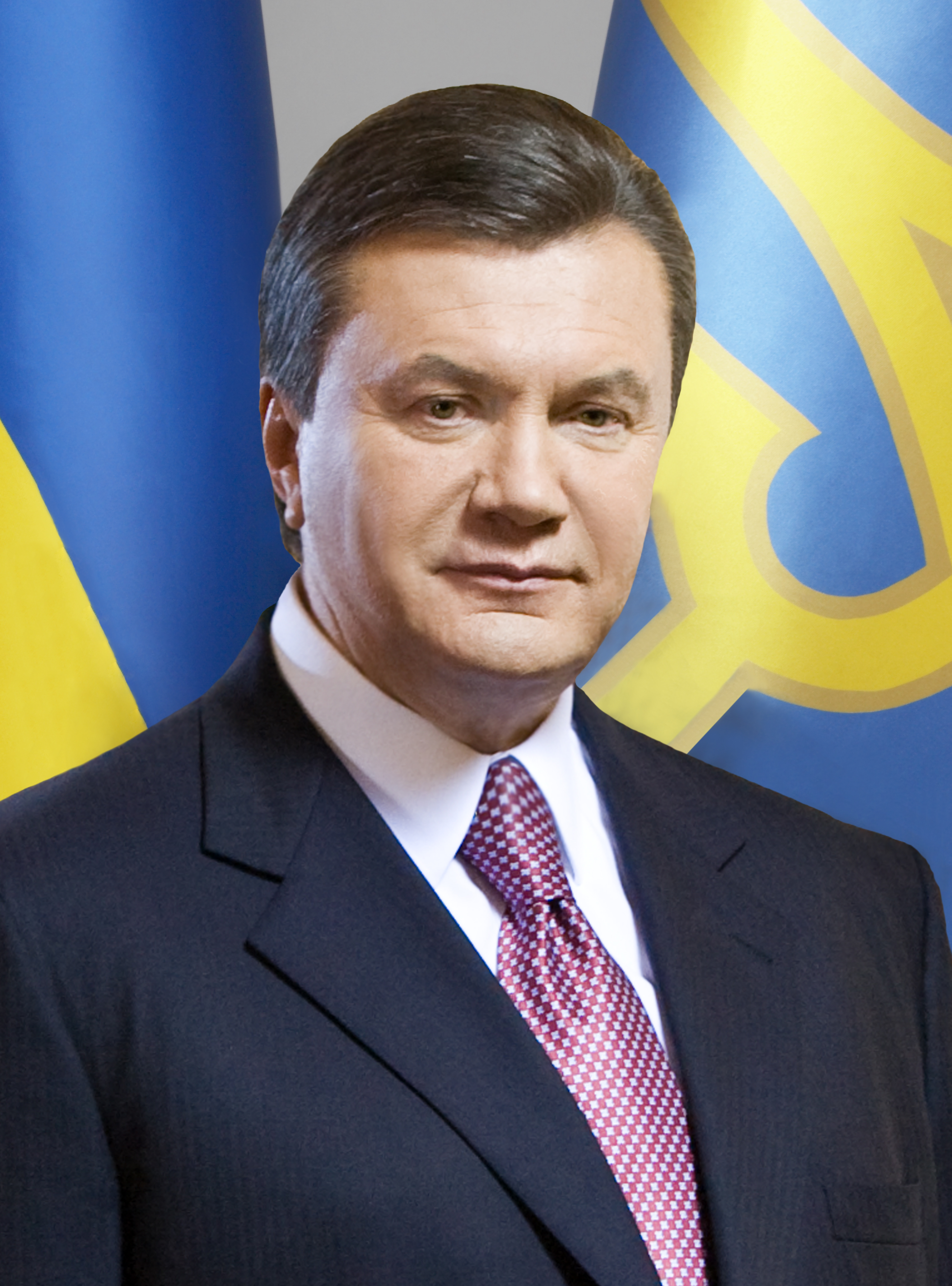
- Official portrait, 2010

4th President of Ukraine
- In office 25 February 2010 – 22 February 2014 (Note: Fled the country on the night of 21–22 February, but claiming the presidency sometime after that. Officially deprived of the title on 18 June 2015.)
- Prime Minister: Yulia Tymoshenko; Oleksandr Turchynov (acting); Mykola Azarov; Serhiy Arbuzov (acting)
- Preceded by: Viktor Yushchenko
- Succeeded by: Petro Poroshenko (Note: Oleksandr Turchynov served as Acting President of Ukraine from 23 February 2014 to 7 June 2014.)

9th and 12th Prime Minister of Ukraine
- In office 4 August 2006 – 18 December 2007
- President: Viktor Yushchenko
- Deputy: Mykola Azarov
- Preceded by: Yuriy Yekhanurov
- Succeeded by: Yulia Tymoshenko
- In office 28 December 2004 – 5 January 2005
- President: Leonid Kuchma
- Deputy: Mykola Azarov
- Preceded by: Mykola Azarov (acting)
- Succeeded by: Mykola Azarov (acting)
- In office 21 November 2002 – 7 December 2004
- President: Leonid Kuchma
- Deputy: Mykola Azarov
- Preceded by: Anatoliy Kinakh
- Succeeded by: Mykola Azarov (acting)

People's Deputy of Ukraine
- In office 25 May 2006 – 12 September 2006
- Constituency: At-large
- In office 23 November 2007 – 19 February 2010
- Constituency: At-large

Governor of Donetsk Oblast
- In office 14 May 1997 – 21 November 2002
- Preceded by: Serhii Polyakov
- Succeeded by: Anatoliy Blyznyuk

Chairman of Donetsk Oblast Council
- In office 14 May 1999 – 14 May 2001
- Preceded by: Ivan Ponomaryov
- Succeeded by: Borys Kolesnikov

Deputy Governor of Donetsk Oblast
- In office August 1996 – May 1997
- Governor: Serhii Polyakov

Personal details
- Born: 9 July 1950 (age 76) Yenakiieve, Ukrainian SSR, Soviet Union
- Citizenship: Soviet Union (until 1991); Ukraine (1991–2023); Russia (from 2014)
- Party: Party of Regions (1997–2014)
- Other political affiliations: CPSU (1980–1991)
- Spouse: Lyudmilla Nastenko (m. 1971; div. 2016)
- Children: Oleksandr; Viktor
- Education: Donetsk National Technical University; Ukrainian State University of Finance and International Trade
- Website: Viktor Yanukovych, President of Ukraine (Archived)
- Viktor Yanukovych's voice Viktor Yanukovych at a press conference with Dmitry Medvedev on closer relations between Ukraine and Russia and agreements on negotiations Recorded 5 March 2010

Viktor Fedorovych Yanukovych (Note: Ukrainian: Віктор Федорович Янукович, pronounced [ˈwiktor ˈfɛdorowɪtʃ jɐnʊˈkɔwɪtʃ]; Russian: Виктор Федорович Янукович.) (born 9 July 1950) is a Ukrainian former politician who served as the fourth president of Ukraine from 2010 to 2014. He also served as the prime minister of Ukraine several times between 2002 and 2007 and was a member of the Verkhovna Rada (parliament) from 2006 to 2010. Yanukovych was removed from the presidency during the 2014 Revolution of Dignity, which followed months of protests against him. Since then, he has lived in exile in Russia.

Yanukovych was a member of the pro-Russian Party of Regions. Before entering national politics, Yanukovych was the governor of his native Donetsk Oblast from 1997 to 2002. He was simultaneously the chairman of the oblast's legislature from 1999 to 2001. He first ran for president in the 2004 election, where he was declared the winner against Viktor Yushchenko. However, allegations of electoral fraud and voter intimidation caused widespread protests, in what became known as the Orange Revolution. The Ukrainian Supreme Court nullified the election and ordered a rerun, which Yanukovych lost to Yushchenko. Yanukovych ran for president again in 2010, this time beating Yulia Tymoshenko in an election deemed free and fair by international observers.

Yanukovych stood for economic modernisation, greater economic ties with the EU, and military non-alignment. However, his years in power saw what analysts described as democratic backsliding, which included the jailing of Tymoshenko, a decline in press freedom and an increase in cronyism and corruption. In November 2013, Yanukovych suddenly withdrew from signing an association agreement with the EU, amidst economic pressure from Russia. Ukraine's parliament had overwhelmingly approved finalizing the agreement. This sparked massive protests against him, known as the Euromaidan. The unrest peaked in February 2014, when almost 100 protesters were killed by government forces. An agreement was signed by Yanukovych and the opposition on 21 February 2014, but he secretly fled the capital that evening. The next day, Ukraine's parliament voted to remove him and schedule early elections on the grounds that he had withdrawn from his constitutional duties. Some of his own party voted for his removal.

Ukraine's new government issued an arrest warrant for Yanukovych, accusing him of responsibility for the killing of protesters. He fled to Russia, claiming to still be the head of state. In 2019, he was sentenced in absentia to a thirteen-year prison term for high treason by a Ukrainian court. In polling conducted since he left office, Yanukovych has ranked as one of the worst presidents in Ukrainian history. (Note: Attributed to multiple sources:) Yanukovych has also given his name to a collective term for blunders made by Ukrainian politicians: Yanukisms.

== Early life and career ==
Viktor Fedorovych Yanukovych was born on 9 July 1950 in Zhukovka, a village near Yenakiieve in the Donetsk Oblast of the Ukrainian SSR of the Soviet Union. Of his childhood, he has written: "My childhood was difficult and hungry. I grew up without my mother, who died when I was two. I went around bare-footed on the streets. I had to fight for myself every day.

Yanukovych is of Russian, Polish and Belarusian descent. Yanukovych is a surname of Belarusian origin, Yanuk being a derivative of the Catholic name Yan ("John"). His mother was a Russian nurse, and his father, Fyodor Yanukovych, was a Polish-Belarusian locomotive-driver, originally from Yanuki in the Dokshytsy Raion of the Vitebsk Region which is in present-day Belarus. On various occasions, Yanukovych's family has been dogged by accusations that Fyodor Yanukovych was a member of the Schutzmannschaft during World War II, in particular claims by members of the Yulia Tymoshenko Bloc, which included documents from the NKVD supposedly revealing his involvement with the Schutzmannschaft. However, it has also been stated by residents of Yanuki that Yanukovych's family left for the Donbas before 1917, and that the collaborator Fyodor Yanukovych was an unrelated individual. Others, particularly members of the Party of Regions, have claimed that the documents were a falsehood with the intention of disparaging Yanukovych ahead of elections.

By the time he was a teenager, Yanukovych's father had remarried. However, Viktor left home due to conflicts with his stepmother and was brought up by his Polish paternal grandmother, who was originally from Warsaw. His grandfather and great-grandparents were Lithuanian-Poles. Yanukovych has half-sisters from his father's remarriage but has no contact with them.

In 1971, Yanukovych married Lyudmyla Nastenko a niece of Yenakiieve city judge Oleksandr Sazhyn.

In July 1974, Yanukovych enrolled at the Donetsk Polytechnic Institute. In 1976, as a second-year student, he was promoted to director of a trucking division within the Ordzhonikidzeugol coal-mining company. His appointment as the chief manager marked the start of his managerial career as a regional transport executive. He held various positions in transport companies in Yenakiieve and Donetsk until 1996.

=== Criminal convictions ===
On 15 December 1967, at the age of 17, Yanukovych was sentenced to three years imprisonment for participating in a robbery and assault. On 8 June 1970 he was convicted for a second time on charges of assault. He was sentenced to two years of imprisonment and did not appeal the verdict. Decades later, Yanukovych characterised his arrests and imprisonment as "mistakes of youth".

On 27 December 1978 both of Yanukovych's convictions were overturned by the Donetsk Regional Court at the initiative of judge Vitaliy Boiko, after an appeal by cosmonaut Georgy Beregovoy, then deputy of the Supreme Soviet of the Soviet Union. In 2005 deputy head prosecutor of Donetsk Oblast initiated a proceeding concerning possible falsification of documents confirming the overturn of Yanukovych's convictions, however in 2006 it was abandoned. According to a local judge, the originals of documents concerning Yanukovych's convictions went missing from the Yenakiieve court between 1989 and 2000 due to "insufficient security measures".

In October 2004, Ukrainian deputy Hryhoriy Omelchenko accused Yanukovych of having been a member of "a group of individuals who brutally beat and raped a woman, but bought off the victim and the criminal case was closed". The press-service of the Ukrainian Cabinet asserted that Yanukovych suffered for the attempt to defend a girl from hooligans.

== Political career: 1996–2010 ==
=== Head of Donetsk Oblast Administration (1997–2002) ===
Yanukovych's political career began when he was appointed as a Vice-Head of Donetsk Oblast Administration in August 1996. On 14 May 1997, he was appointed as the Head of the Administration (i.e. Governor). Oligarch Rinat Akhmetov was widely considered to have played a key role in Yanukovych's appointment as governor. During his tenure in Donetsk, local business groups, dominated by the Industrial Union of Donbas, managed to concentrate under their control the entire production chain of the region's coal and metal industries, as well as energy production. In June 1998 Yanukovych was elected member of Donetsk Oblast Council.

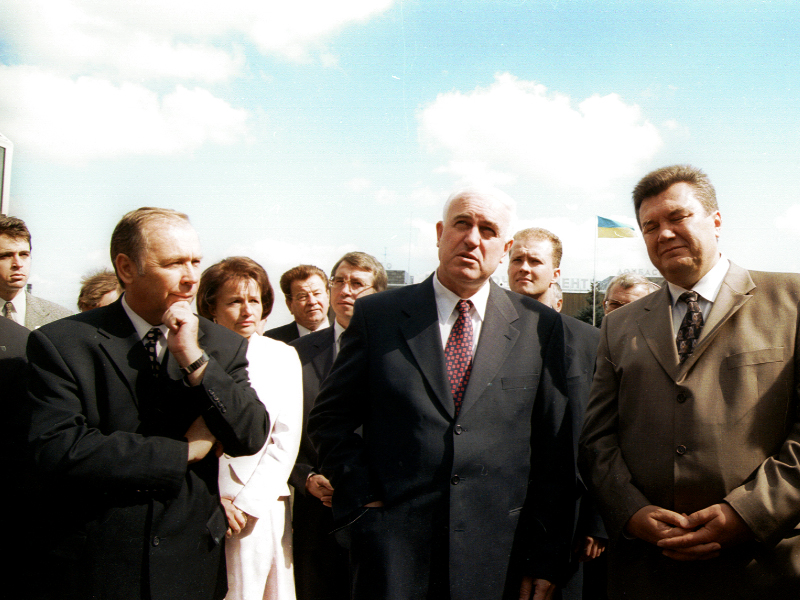
Yanukovych with Donetsk mayor Volodymyr Rybak (left) during his term as regional governor

In 2001 Yanukovych became a member of the newly created Party of Regions, which was considered to represent the interests of the "Donetsk Clan". As governor, he was seen by journalists as a protegée of the party's head Mykola Azarov, who also served as head of the State Tax Administration of Ukraine. Yanukovych was claimed to have played a key role in the privatization of Alchevsk Metallurgical Complex, during which representatives of "Donetsk Clan" and "Dnipropetrovsk Mafia" received equal shares of the enterprise. During that time he criticized the centralization of Ukrainian politics and called on authorities in Kyiv to define the rights and obligations of separate regions before the government. Yanukovych publicly supported For United Ukraine! during the 2002 Ukrainian parliamentary election. As a result of the vote, Donetsk Oblast became the only region of Ukraine, where the pro-government party won the election amid claims of numerous violations of electoral process.

=== Prime Minister (2002–2004) ===
President Leonid Kuchma appointed Yanukovych to the post of prime minister following Anatoliy Kinakh's resignation. Yanukovych began his term as prime minister on 21 November 2002 following a 234-vote confirmation in the Ukrainian parliament, eight more than needed. According to Frankfurter Allgemeine Zeitung, Yanukovych's appointment was part of Kuchma's plan to establish a counterweight to the powerful head of his administration, Viktor Medvedchuk. Opposition politicians considered Yanukovych's government to be the result of a compromise between the Donetsk, Dnipropetrovsk and Kyiv oligarchic clans. On his post Yanukovych supported the expansion of authority of the executive branch.

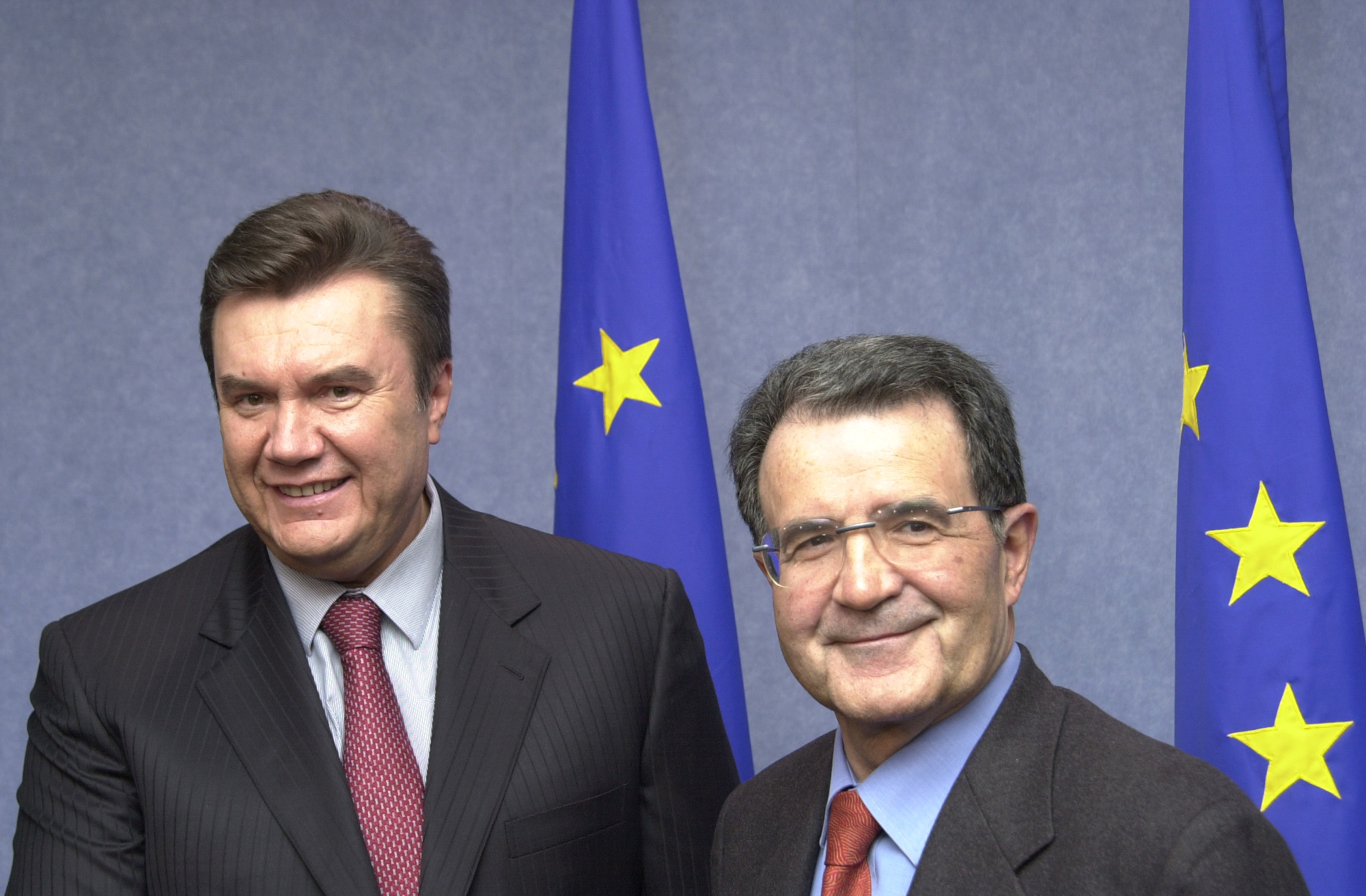
Yanukovych during a meeting with European Commission president Romano Prodi in 2003

During the first year of Yanukovych's premiership, Ukraine's population suffered from rising bread and grain prices, which were blamed on falsified data about the previous year's harvest and led to what was described as the country's worst food crisis since independence 12 years earlier. In order to combat inflation, the cabinet allocated 400 million hryvnias to be spent on grain imports. Yanukovych himself called the rise of prices "artificial" and demand from regional governors to take measures in order to limit it. In 2003 his government established a two-year moratorium on taxation benefits. Some experts blamed Yanukovych's cabinet of reversing market reforms and returning to the practices of market intervention, subsidies and price controls.

In foreign affairs, Yanukovych's cabinet was considered to be politically close to Russia, promoting the creation of the Single Economic Space, but at the same time declared support for Ukrainian membership in the European Union. Although Yanukovych's parliamentary coalition was not supporting Ukrainian membership in the North Atlantic Treaty Organization (NATO), his cabinet agreed to the commission of Ukrainian troops to the Iraq War in support of the United States' war on terrorism. Yanukovych also supported Ukraine's membership in the World Trade Organization. During the Tuzla Island crisis in 2003, Yanukovych held negotiations with Russian prime minister Mikhail Kasyanov, as a result of which an agreement was reached to remove Ukrainian border guards from the island in exchange for Russia stopping the construction of its dam. However, Yanukovych later denied that removal of border troops was part of the agreement, and Ukrainian guards remained on the island.

=== 2004 presidential campaign ===
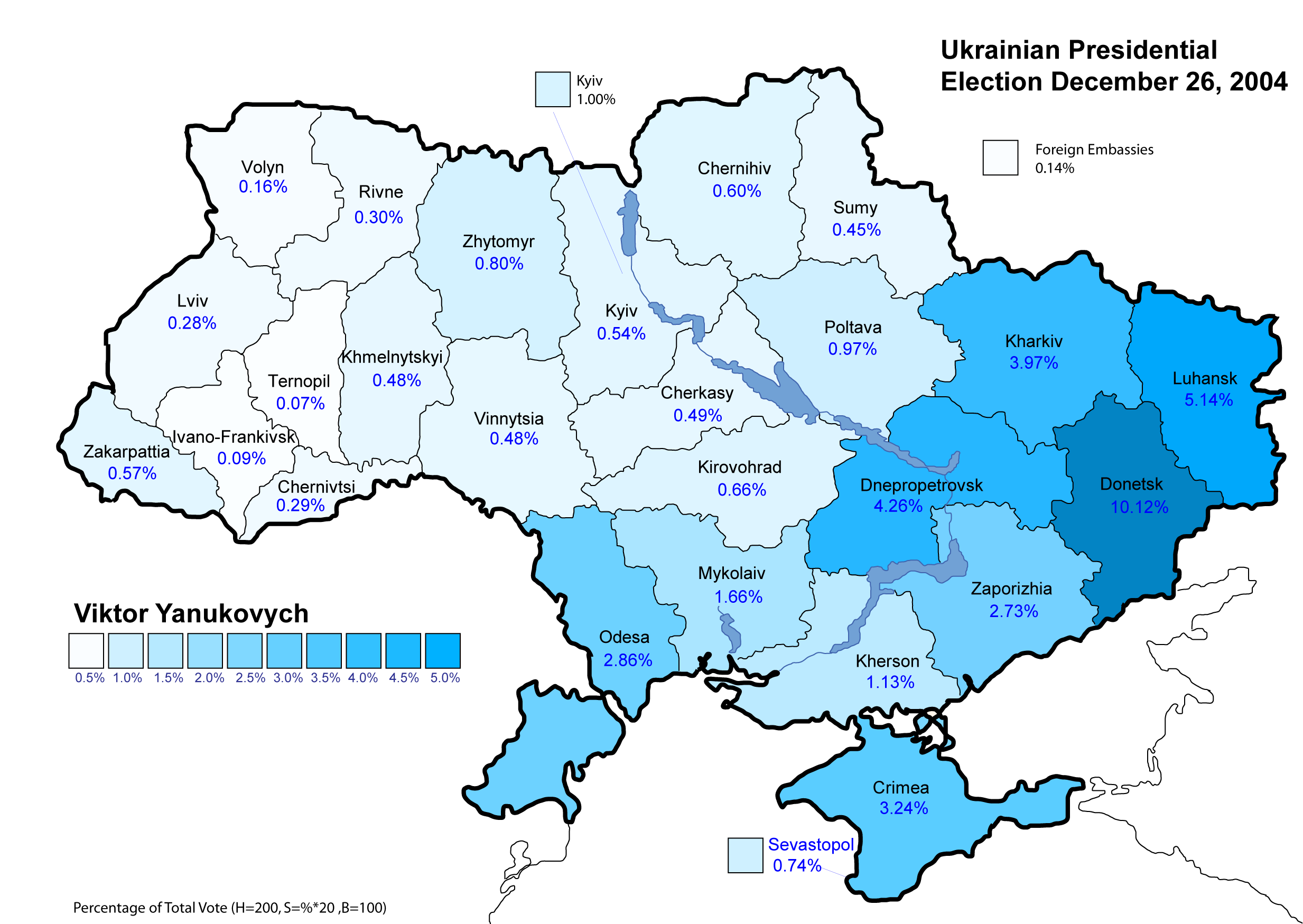
Percentage of total national vote for Yanukovych in the final round of the 2004 presidential election

In 2004, as the prime minister, Yanukovych participated in the controversial Ukrainian presidential election as the candidate of the ruling coalition. Yanukovych's candidacy was officially approved on 4 July 2004 by a congress involving representatives of the Party of Regions, Labour Ukraine and Social Democratic Party of Ukraine (united), with Labour Ukraine leader Serhiy Tihipko being appointed to head his election headquarters. Volodymyr Lytvyn's People's Agrarian Party, Valeriy Pustovoitenko's People's Democratic Party, Heorhiy Kirpa's Revival, as well as Spravedlyvist, Russian Bloc and several other minor parties later issued their own declarations in support of Yanukovych's candidacy.

His nomination was approved by president Leonid Kuchma.

Yanukovych's main base of support emerged from the southern and eastern regions of Ukraine, which favored close ties with neighbouring Russia. During his campaign, he supported the provision of official status to Russian language in Ukraine, while insisting, that Ukrainian should remain the only "state language". He also supported the introduction of double citizenship with Russia and promoted church unification.

According to the Committee of Voters of Ukraine, Yanukovych's presidential campaign was actively supported by government-owned media, giving him an unfair advantage over other candidates. Yanukovych was also openly supported by the Ukrainian Orthodox Church - Moscow Patriarchate metropolitan Volodymyr Sabodan. Russian political scientist Gleb Pavlovsky, who had previously cooperated with Kuchma's administration, took part in his presidential campaign. A number of popular performers, including Iosif Kobzon, Yan Tabachnik, Taisia Povaliy, Natasha Korolyova and Filipp Kirkorov took part in concerts in support of Yanukovych. His candidacy was openly endorsed by Russian politician Vladimir Zhirinovsky, while Russian president Vladimir Putin wished Yanukovych "success" in the election.

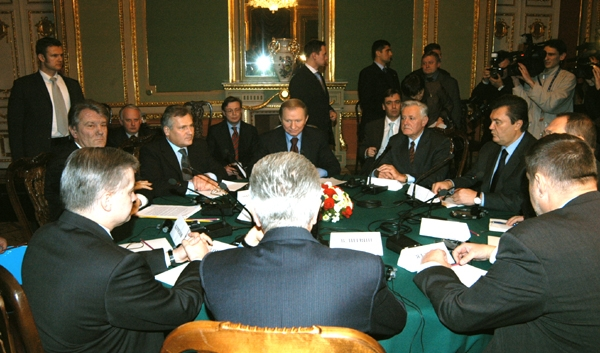
Yanukovych (sitting on the right) attending talks with opposition representatives during the Orange Revolution in Kyiv

In the first round of voting held on 31 October 2004, Yanukovych took second place with 39.3 percent of the votes to opposition leader Viktor Yushchenko with 39.8 percent. Because no candidate passed the 50 percent threshold, a second round of voting was scheduled. In the second round of the election, Yanukovych was initially declared the winner, with Putin congratulating him with "solid victory" in a telephone call. However, the legitimacy of the election was questioned by Ukrainians, international organizations, and foreign governments following allegations of electoral fraud. The resulting widespread protests became known as the Orange Revolution. The second round of the election was subsequently annulled by the Supreme Court of Ukraine, and in the repeated run-off, Yanukovych lost to Yushchenko with 44.2 percent to Yushchenko's 51.9 percent.

=== Resignation and aftermath ===
After the election, the Ukrainian parliament passed a non-binding motion of no confidence in Yanukovych's government, urging outgoing President Kuchma to dismiss Yanukovych and appoint a caretaker government. Five days after his electoral defeat, Yanukovych declared his resignation from the post of prime minister. In November 2009 Yanukovych stated that he conceded defeat only to avoid violence. "I didn't want mothers to lose their children and wives their husbands. I didn't want dead bodies from Kyiv to flow down the Dnipro. I didn't want to assume power through bloodshed."

Following his electoral defeat in 2004, Yanukovych led the main opposition party against the Tymoshenko government made up of Yushchenko's Our Ukraine, the Yulia Tymoshenko Bloc, and Oleksandr Moroz's Socialist Party. This government was marred by growing conflict between Yushchenko and Tymoshenko. Yanukovych's Party of Regions support allowed for the establishment of Yuriy Yekhanurov's government in late 2005.

In 2005, the Party of Regions signed a collaboration agreement with the Russian political party United Russia. In 2008, Yanukovych spoke at a congress of the United Russia party.

=== Return to government ===
==== 2006 election ====
Following the resignation of his head of administration Oleksandr Zinchenko, president Yushchenko dismissed Yulia Tymoshenko from the post of Prime Minister and appointed Yuriy Yekhanurov as head of a technocratic government which acted until the new parliamentary election.

In January 2006, the Ministry of Internal Affairs of Ukraine started an official investigation of the allegedly false acquittal of the criminal convictions which Yanukovych received in his youth. Yuriy Lutsenko, the head of the ministry, announced that forensic tests proved the forgery of the respective documents (issued in instead of 1978) and initially claimed that lack of the formal acquittal precluded Yanukovych from running for the seat in the 2006 parliamentary election.

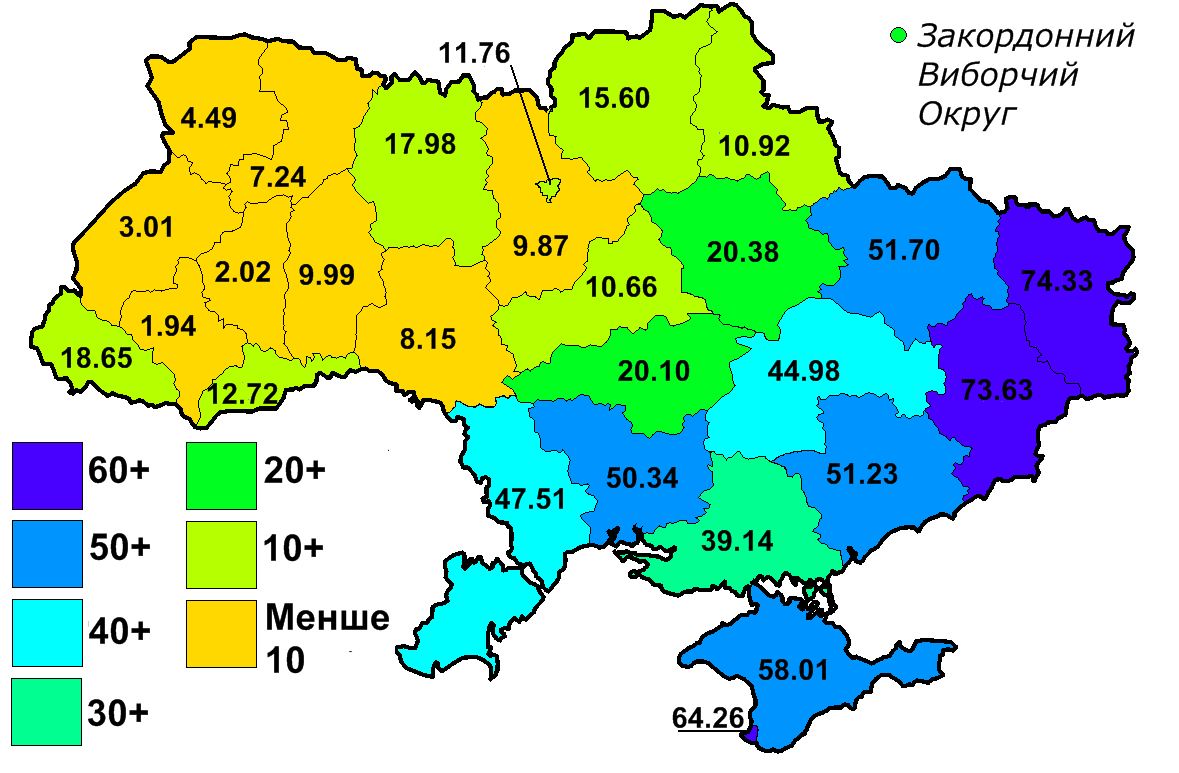
Percentage of votes for the Party of Regions in the 2006 parliamentary election

However, the latter statement was corrected within days by Lutsenko, who conceded that the outcome of the investigation into the legality of the Yanukovych's acquittal could not affect his eligibility to run for the parliament seat since the deprivation of his civil rights due to the past convictions would have expired anyway due to the statute of limitations. Yanukovych's Party of Regions won the 2006 Ukrainian parliamentary election, and Yanukovych returned to premiership when he was appointed to the position of prime minister by Yushchenko in August 2006.

In 2006, a criminal charge was made for the falsification of documents regarding the retraction of Yanukovych's prior conviction. According to Rossiyskaya Gazeta two documents had been forged regarding Yanukovych's robbery in association with rape and assault and battery. The signature of the judge for these documents in Yanukovych's retraction was also reportedly forged.

==== Second premiership (2006–2007) ====
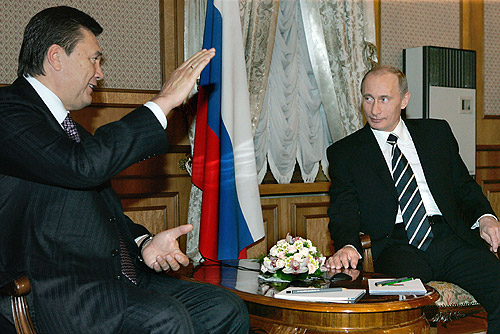
Russian president Vladimir Putin meets Prime Minister Yanukovych during a visit to Kyiv (22 December 2006).

On 4 August 2006, one day after the signing of the Universal of National Unity by the majority of Ukraine's political parties, Yanukovych was appointed Prime Minister as representative of the "Anti-crisis coalition" created by the Party of Regions, the Socialist Party of Ukraine and the Communists. The Universal declared the plans of the new government to respect the citizens' rights and freedoms and to reform the law enforcement and justice systems, as well as the economy. It promoted Ukraine's course for European integration and membership in the World Trade Organization and NATO, with the last point having to be approved by a popular referendum. At the same time, the plan proclaimed Ukraine's co-operation with the Common Economic Space.

On the very day of Yanukovych's appointment, the Verkhovna Rada approved a law, which prevented the Constitutional Court from putting in question the Constitutional reform of 2004, according to which the president only had a right to appoint two ministers in the cabinet. Nevertheless, 9 representatives of Yushchenko's Our Ukraine - People's Self-Defense Bloc entered Yanukovych's government, compared to 14 ministers appointed by the Party of Regions.

==== 2007 election and loss of power ====
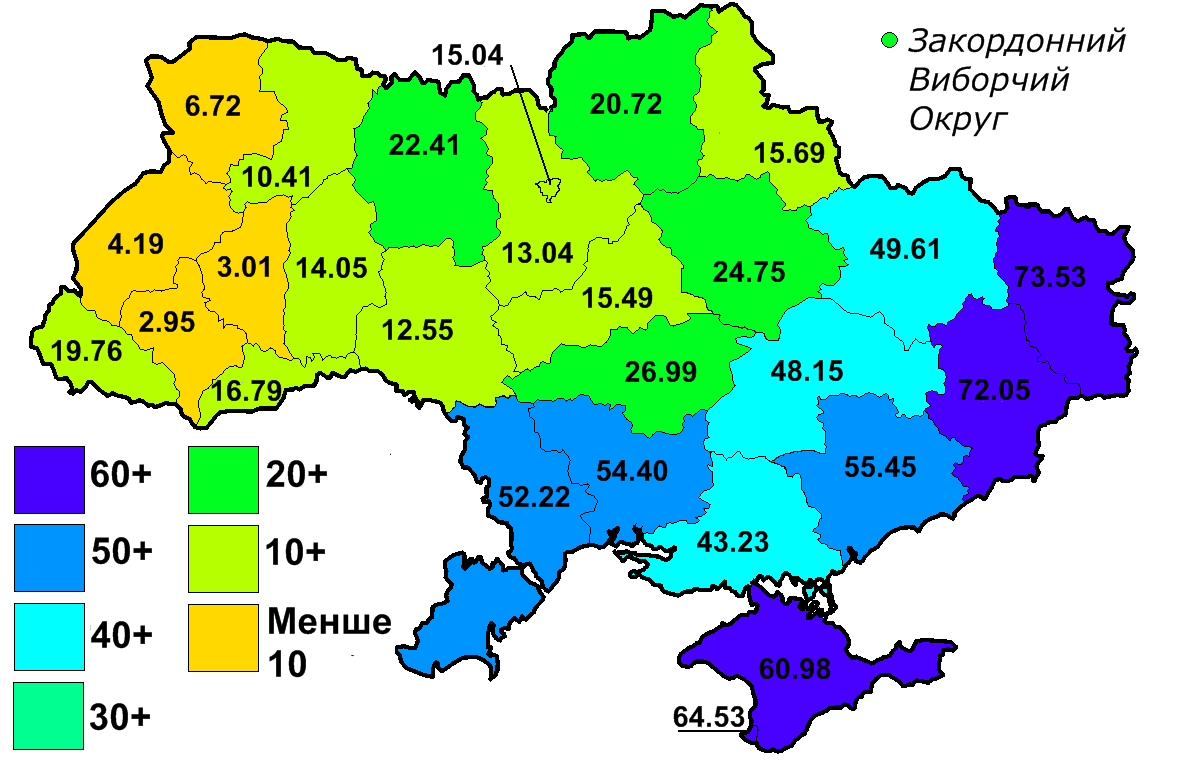
Percentage of votes for the Party of Regions during the 2007 election

Soon after the establishment of his government, Yanukovych's supporters started attempts to "squeeze out" Yushchenko's allies from the cabinet, and worked to further increase the powers of Prime Minister. Recognizing this as a violation of the Universal of National Unity, on 2 April 2007 Yushchenko signed a decree on the dissolution of the parliament, appointing early parliamentary elections for 30 September.

On 25 May 2007, Yanukovych was assigned the post of appointed chairman of the Government Chiefs Council of the Commonwealth of Independent States.

In the 2007 Ukrainian parliamentary election political forces supportive of Yulia Tymoshenko achieved a majority of votes, which resulted in her second appointment as Prime Minister on 18 December 2007.

=== 2010 presidential campaign and election ===
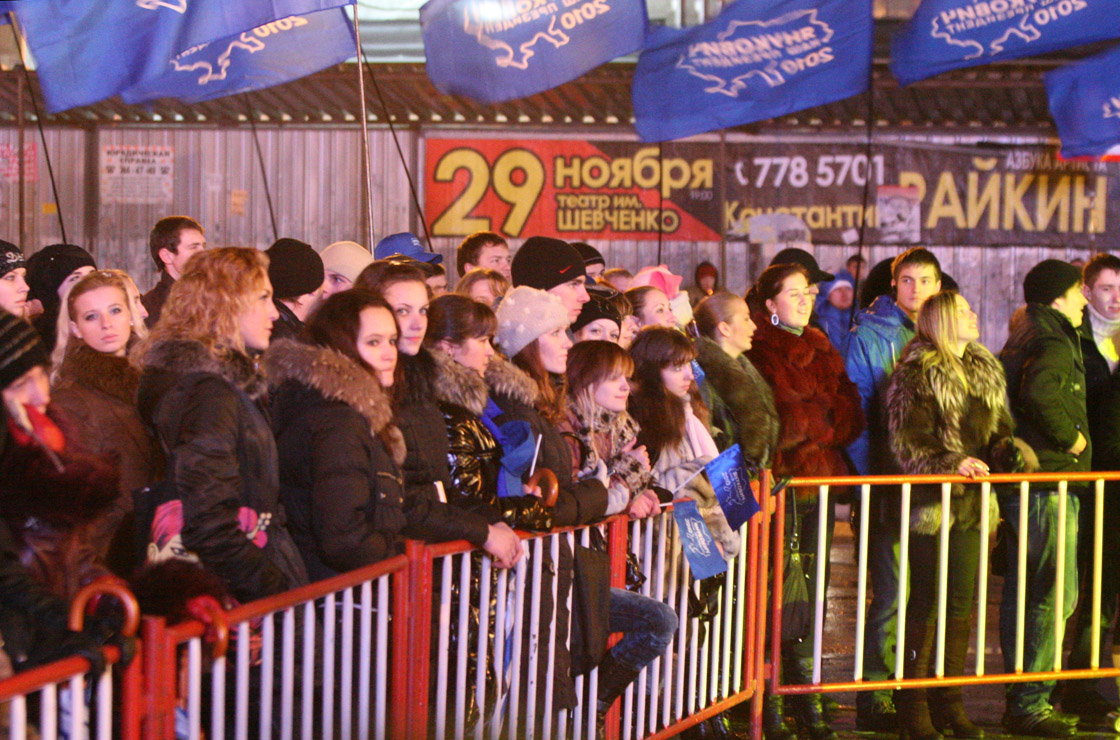
Supporters of Viktor Yanukovych in Dnipropetrovsk, December 2009

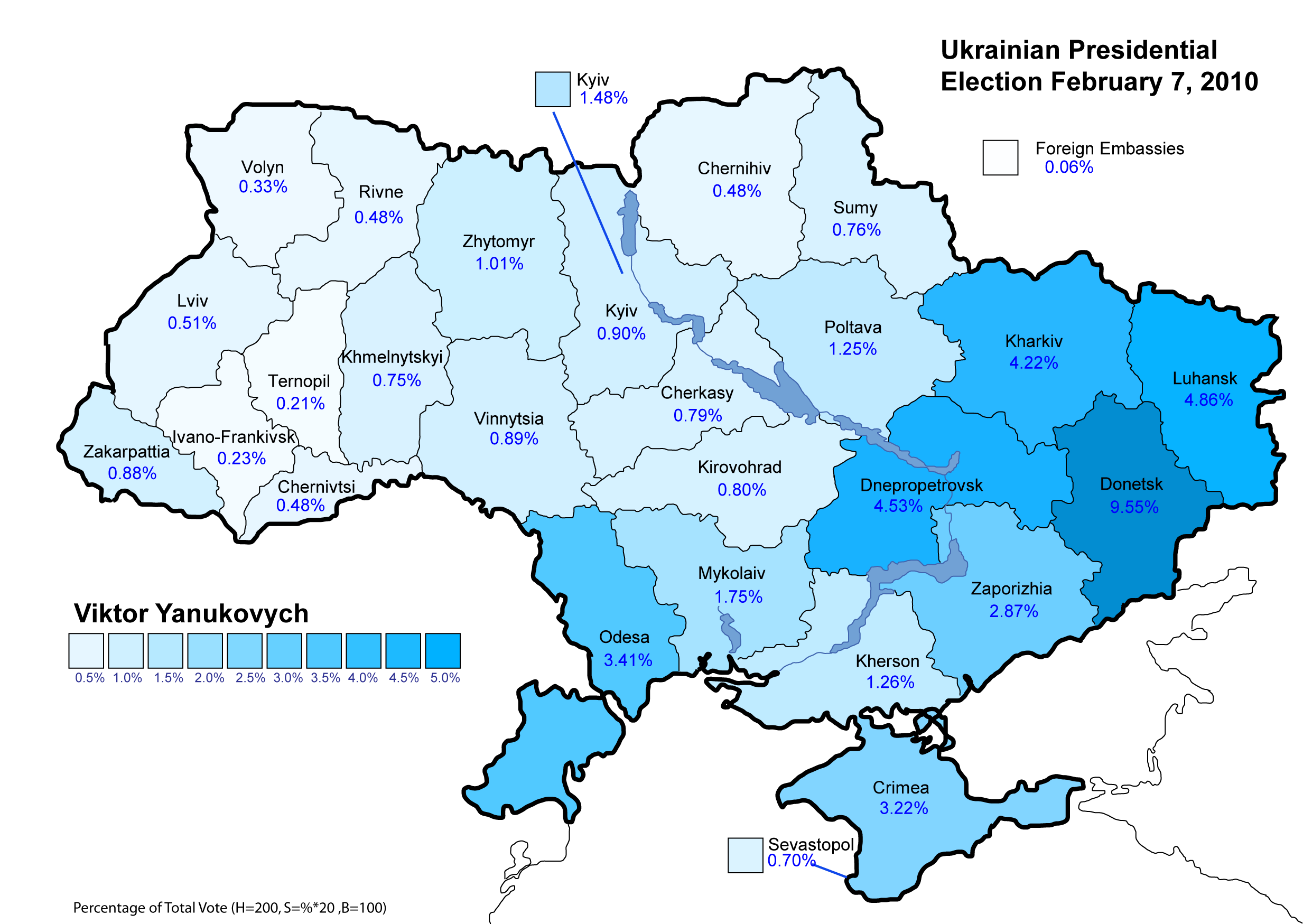
Percentage of total national vote for Yanukovych in the 2nd round of 2010 presidential election (48.95%)

In 2009, Yanukovych announced his intent to run for president in the then upcoming presidential election. He was endorsed by the Party of Regions and the Youth Party of Ukraine.

Minister of Internal Affairs Yuriy Lutsenko accused Yanukovych of financial fraud during the campaign. Yanukovych's campaign was expected to have cost $100 to $150 million.

On 11 December 2009, Yanukovych called for his supporters to go to Maidan Nezalezhnosti, Kyiv's Independence Square, in case of election fraud.

Early vote returns from the first round of the election held on 17 January showed Yanukovych in first place with 35.8% of the vote. He faced a 7 February 2010 runoff against Tymoshenko, who finished second (with 24.7% of the vote). After all ballots were counted, the Ukrainian Central Election Commission declared that Yanukovych won the runoff election with 48.95% of the vote compared with 45.47% for Tymoshenko. Election observers from the Organisation for Security and Co-operation in Europe (OSCE) said there were no indications of serious fraud and described the vote as an "impressive display" of democracy. Tymoshenko withdrew her subsequent legal challenge of the result. Tad Devine, an associate of Rick Gates and Paul Manafort, wrote Yanukovych's victory speech.

== Presidency: 2010–2014 ==
=== Inauguration ===
Ukraine's parliament had (on 16 February) fixed 25 February 2010 for the inauguration of Yanukovych as president. Ukrainian president Viktor Yushchenko signed a decree endorsing a plan of events related to Yanukovych's inauguration on 20 February 2010. Yushchenko also congratulated and wished Yanukovych "to defend Ukrainian interests and democratic traditions" at the presidential post.

Patriarch Kirill of Moscow and All Rus at Yanukovych's invitation conducted a public prayer service at Kyiv Pechersk Lavra before Yanukovych's presidential inauguration. Kirill also attended the inauguration along with High Representative of the Union for Foreign Affairs and Security Policy Catherine Ashton, United States National Security Advisor James Jones and speaker of the Russian parliament Boris Gryzlov.

Yanukovych's immediate predecessor, Yushchenko, did not attend the ceremony, nor did the Prime Minister, Yulia Tymoshenko, and her party, Bloc Yulia Tymoshenko.

=== First steps as president ===
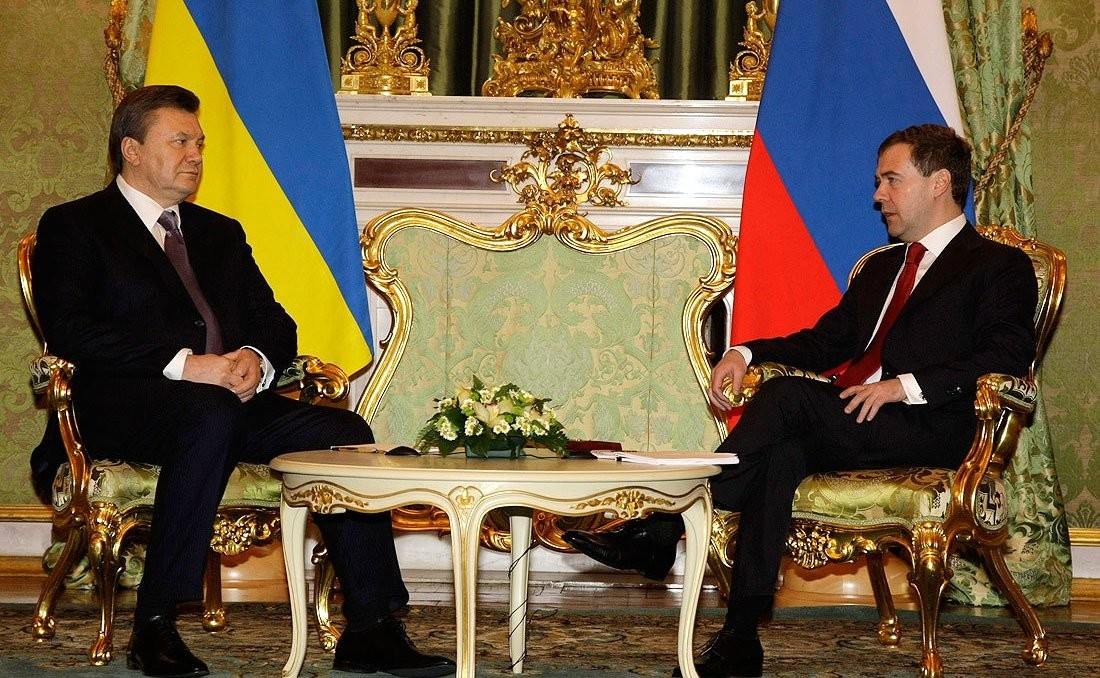
With Russian President Dmitry Medvedev, 5 March 2010

On 3 March 2010, Yanukovych suspended his membership in the Party of Regions as he was barred by the Constitution from heading a political party while president, and handed over leadership in the party and its parliamentary faction to Mykola Azarov. The predominant expectation of political experts following Yanukovych's election as president was that he would likely pursue a Kuchma-style "multi-vector" policy internationally, and that his presidential authority would be weakened as a result of the constitutional amendments made in 2004. However, those forecasts were made invalid by the swift concentration of power by the president and his Party of Regions, which some analysts interpreted as a parliamentary coup d'etat and made comparisons to the historical Nazi policies of Gleichschaltung.

=== Establishment of the Azarov government ===
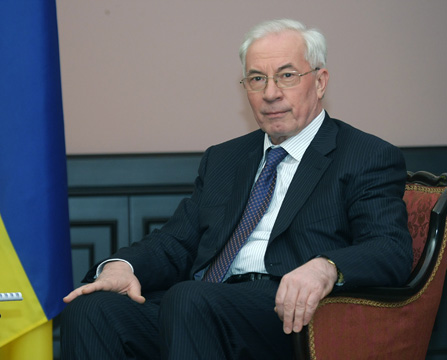
Prime Minister Mykola Azarov soon after his appointment in April 2010

The Party of Regions and its satellites – the Communist Party of Ukraine and the Lytvyn Bloc – did not have a parliamentary majority in order to create a new government. The Ukrainian Constitution stipulated that a government should be created by a coalition of parliamentary fractions, not by individual members of parliament. Those amendments had been introduced in 2004 in order to limit political corruption. As a result, the only legal way for the Party of Regions to create a government was to establish a coalition either with the Yulia Tymoshenko Bloc or with Yushchenko's "Our Ukraine", or to announce early parliamentary elections.

However, Yanukovych and his supporters opted for a different way of forming a parliamentary majority: at the initiative of the Party of Regions, the parliament amended the law by allowing separate members of parliament to be accepted into the coalition on an individual basis, even if they belonged to opposition. As a result, the new "Stability and Reforms" coalition was formed by the fraction of the Party of Regions, Lytvyn Bloc and the Communists, as well as 12 members of parliament from the fractions of Yulia Tymoshenko Bloc and "Our Ukraine", including notable figures such as Ivan Plyushch, Oleksandr Omelchenko, Ihor Rybakov and Ihor Palytsia. The latter became known under the derogatory term tushky (Ukrainian: тушки, literally – "carcasses"). The way in which the new coalition was formed was deemed by observers to be illegal and anti-constitutional.

Despite controversy, Ukrainian lawmakers formed the new coalition on 11 March 2010 which included Lytvyn Bloc, Communist Party of Ukraine and Party of Regions that led to the Azarov Government. 235 deputies from the 450-member parliament signed the coalition agreement. The decision was approved by the Constitutional Court of Ukraine and accepted by Western governments and the Ukrainian opposition, with the previous prime minister Yulia Tymoshenko agreeing to step down.

According to Roman Zabzaliuk, a former member of parliament from Yulia Tymoshenko's Bloc, who later switched sides and entered the governing coalition, each individual parliamentarian joining the pro-Yanukovych faction in Verkhovna Rada was promised a one-time payment of $450,000 plus an additional monthly allowance of $20,000 in cash for "proper voting".

=== Concentration of power ===
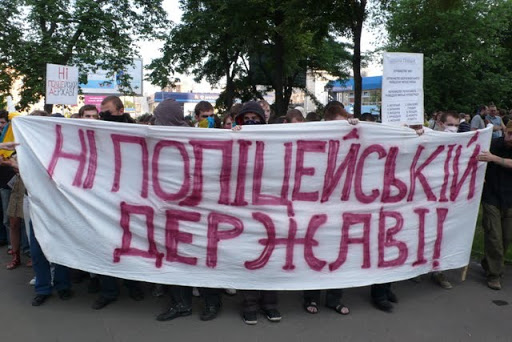
No to police state demonstration in Kyiv, June 2010

==== Subordination of government branches ====
Within a few months, Yanukovych and his team had effectively subordinated all branches of Ukrainian government and marginalized the opposition. The new political regime was seen by some as a continuation of Leonid Kuchma's "blackmail state". Judiciary was de-facto subject to the authorities, with Prosecutor-General Viktor Pshonka himself openly claiming to be a member of the "president's team". This allowed authorities to selectively apply law to the political opposition. According to the newspaper Ukraina Moloda, half a year after Yanukovych's election Ukraine was closer to becoming a police state than it had ever been since independence.

The reform of administration launched during the first year of Yanukovych's presidency resulted in the reshuffling of a number of government agencies, but was also seen as a way to further concentrate power in the president's hands.

==== Constitutional amendments ====
On 25 June 2010, Yanukovych criticised 2004 amendments in the Ukrainian Constitution which weakened presidential powers such as control over naming government ministers, passing those functions to parliament.

In autumn of 2010 the Constitutional Court of Ukraine cancelled the 2004 amendments to the Ukrainian Constitution. This step was claimed to remove the last legal obstacle on the way to the complete concentration of power in President Yanukovych's hands. Nevertheless, during the 2011 World Economic Forum, Yanukovych called Ukraine "one of the leaders on democratic development in Eastern Europe".

In May 2012, Yanukovych set up the Constitutional Assembly of Ukraine, a special auxiliary agency under the President for drawing up bills of amendments to the Constitution of Ukraine; the president then can table them in parliament.

==== Local elections ====
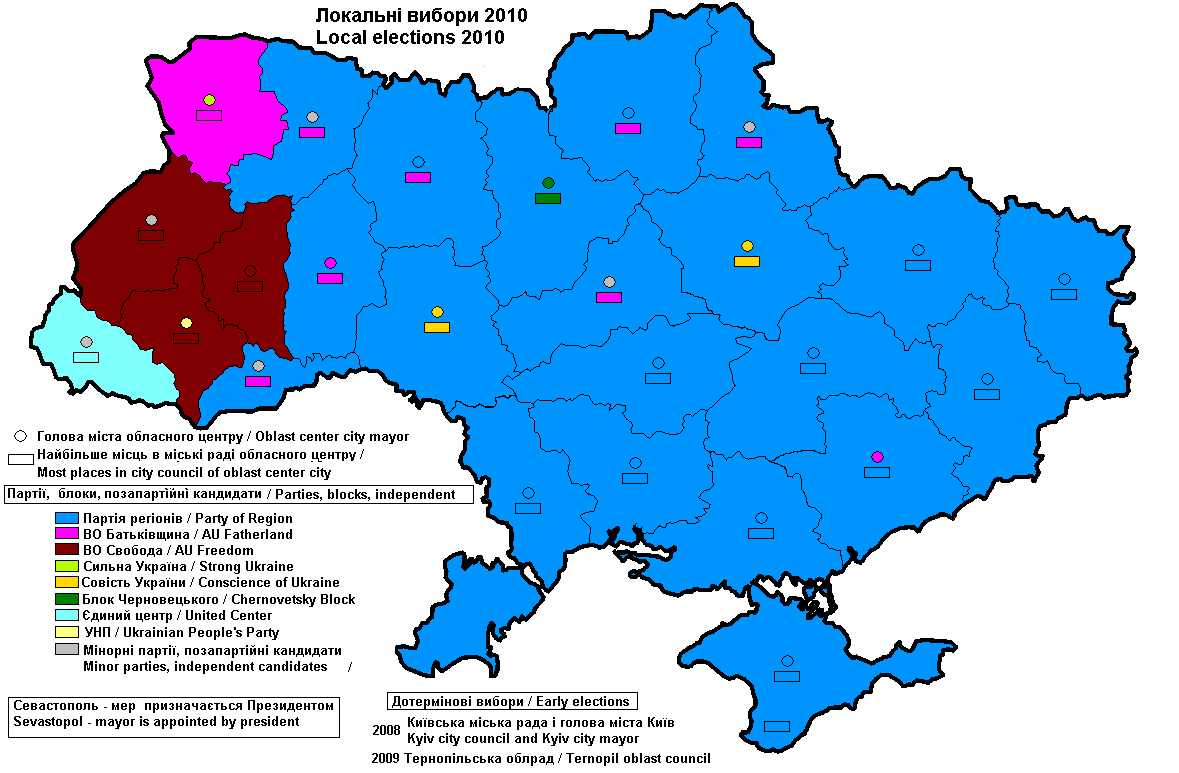
Results of the 2010 Ukrainian local elections, with regional and city councils dominated by the Party of Regions in blue

The local election, which took place on 31 October, was preceded by the introduction of changes in electoral law and replacement of local governors, electoral commission officials and national media managers with pro-government appointees.

During the electoral campaign for the 2010 local elections, the police encroached on the people's constitutional right for peaceful protest, the first such instance since the Orange Revolution. Independent journalists, scholars, activists and opposition figures were also harassed by state authorities, with a number of them being imprisoned or blackmailed into dropping their candidaces. In some cases, bogus political parties were created and registered under the same name as oppositional forces. As a result, Yulia Tymoshenko's "Batkivshchyna", the main rival of the incumbent authorities, was effectively denied participation in several crucial regions during the local election. This led to the rise of the far-right Svoboda party, whose popularity was mostly concentrated in Western Ukraine and produced less challenges to the Party of Regions on a national level.

According to independent observers, the election didn't meet standards for openness and fairness. As a result of the vote, the Party of Regions received a plurality of 36%, but got a chance to create a majority in many regions by co-opting independents and entering coalitions with other parties.

=== State of the rule of law ===
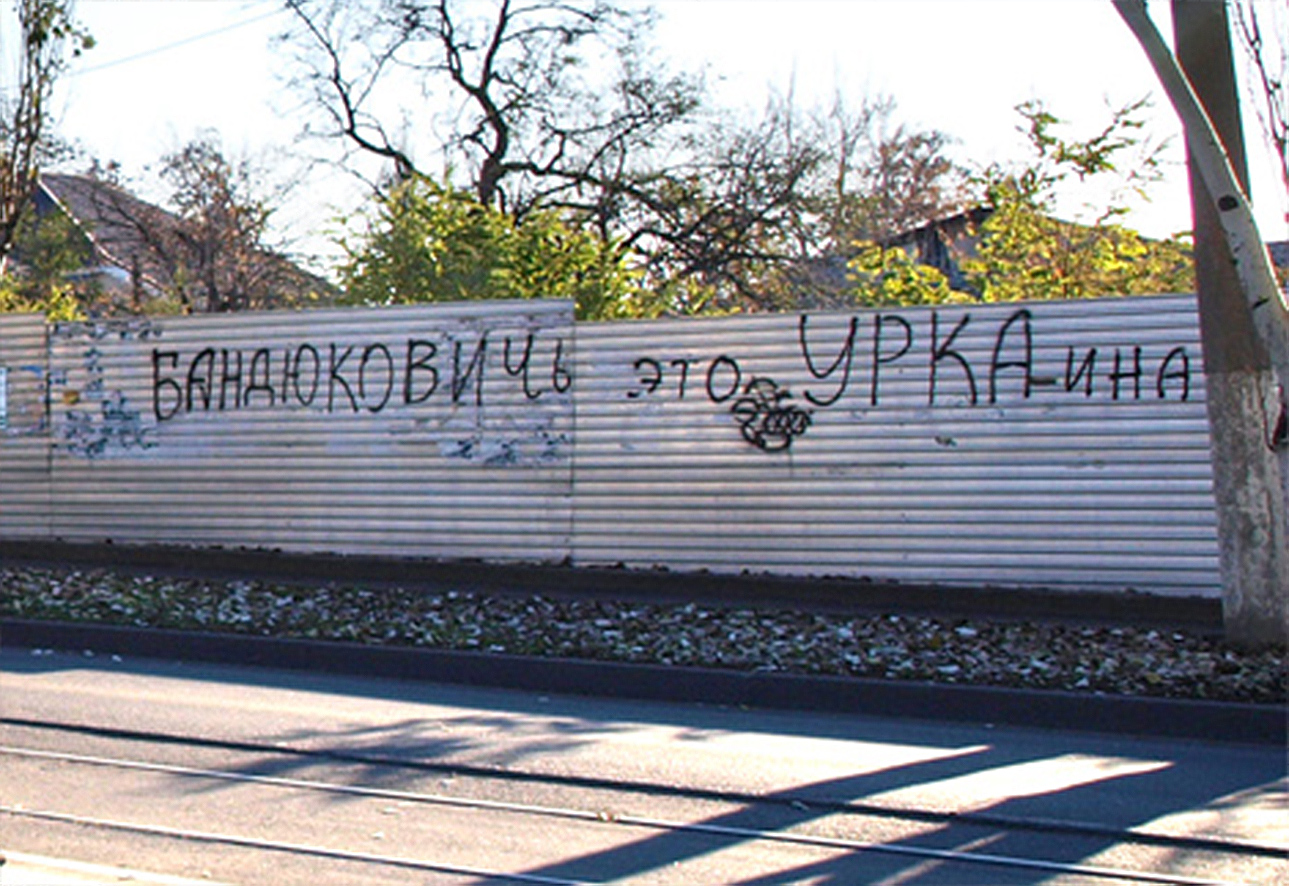
An anti-Yanukovych inscription on a fence in Luhansk, accusing the president of ties to organized crime, 2011

Yanukovych had been elected on promises of returning stability, but the state of Ukraine under his rule was described as a "well-ordered lawlessness" modelled on the "manageable democracy" of neighbouring Russia. Under Yanukovych's rule, chief organs responsible for security, most notably the Security Service of Ukraine (SBU), were headed by oligarch appointees. Among controversial decisions which were deemed to have negative consequences to the rule of law in Ukraine was the release of FSB agent Vladimir Noskov, who had attempted to kidnap a Ukrainian security officer. The number of injuries and suspicious deaths reported as "suicides" significantly rose in Ukrainian prisons in the months after Yanukovych's installment.

==== Persecution of opposition ====
In December 2010 several opposition members of parliament were severely beaten by a group of Party of Regions members in the Verkhovna Rada building. Soon after the event one of the party's leaders Mykhailo Chechetov denied the fact of the assault and claimed that the opposition MPs "broke their own heads against the wall" and were now trying to accuse their opponents.

In early November 2011, Yanukovych claimed that "arms are being bought in the country and armed attacks on government agencies are being prepared." These claims were met with disbelief. Yanukovych and the Party of Regions were accused of trying to create a "controlled democracy" in Ukraine and as a means to this were trying to "destroy" main opposition party BYuT, but both denied these charges. One frequently cited example of Yanukovych's attempts to centralize power is the 2011 sentencing of Yulia Tymoshenko, which was condemned by Western governments as potentially being politically motivated. Other high-profile political opponents under criminal investigation include Kuchma, Bohdan Danylyshyn, Ihor Didenko, Anatoliy Makarenko, and Valeriy Ivaschenko.

According to Yanukovych (on 4 February 2011), "[M]any lies [have been] told and attempts made to misinform the international community and ordinary people in Ukraine about the true state of affairs in the country." He also stated, "[A] crushing blow delivered under [my] rule to corruption and bureaucracy has been met with resistance". He stated in February 2012 that the trial of Tymoshenko and other former officials "didn't meet European standards and principles".

==== Press censorship ====
2014 Press Freedom Index: Very serious situation; Difficult situation; Noticeable problems; Satisfactory situation; Good situation; Not classified / No data; Ukraine moved from "noticeable problems" 89th place in 2009, to "difficult situation" 126th place in 2013

As president, Yanukovych stated in early February 2010 that he would support the freedom of speech of journalists and protect their interests. During spring 2010 Ukrainian journalists and Reporters Without Borders complained of censorship by Yanukovych's Presidential Administration; despite statements by Yanukovych how deeply he valued press freedom and that 'free, independent media that must ensure society's unimpeded access to information.'

Anonymous journalists stated early May 2010 that they were voluntarily tailoring their coverage so as not to offend the Yanukovych administration and the Azarov Government. The Azarov Government, the Presidential Administration and Yanukovych himself denied being involved with censorship. In a press conference 12 May 2010 President Yanukovych's representative in the Parliament Yury Miroshnychenko stated that Yanukovych was against political repression for criticism of the regime.

The first Year of Yanukovych's presidency saw a significant increase in the number of crimes against journalists, as reported by the Kharkiv Human Rights Protection Group. Many reporters would be illegally searched, detained and interrogated by authorities.

==== Vote rigging allegations ====
The Organization for Security and Cooperation in Europe confirmed witness accounts of voters being blocked from access to polls and being attacked along with local election officials who tried to frustrate the Berkut's practice of falsifying voters' ballots in favor of Yanukovych's Party of Regions candidates. Individual cases have been reported of citizens grouping together and fighting back against the Berkut in order to preserve election integrity and results. Upon coming to power Yanukovych had reversed oversight measures established during the Yushchenko administration to restrain the Berkut's abuse of citizens whereupon the special force "upped its brutality."

==== Reports of corruption and cronyism ====
Bureaucracy and corruption are today hiding behind democratic slogans in Ukraine. The Ukrainian nation is wise and it will understand. Because a small handful of people, who have been plundering the country for 20 years is only a handful, from which the whole society, the whole state and our image in the world have been suffering. The interest of the Ukrainian nation is that the practice was put an end to... The country has to change. We need to reverse our approaches 180 degrees, and we will do it. The Ukrainian nation stimulates us to.

— President Yanukovych in Warsaw 4 February 2011, speaking about Ukrainian corruption and cronyism

Yanukovych has been criticized for "massive" corruption and cronyism. Ukraine under his rule was described as a "systemically corrupt" country. According to a 2010 report by Transparency International, 34% of respondents in Ukraine acknowledged paying a bribe at least once during the past year. At the same time, main institutions charged with eliminating corruption – the judiciary and the police – were perceived by the population as the most corrupt.

In February 2012 Yanukovych appointed Ihor Kalinin and Dmytro Salamatin as head of SBU and minister of defence respectively, despite both being known to have been Russian citizens in the past. Soon thereafter mass protests took place in relation to the murder of Oksana Makar in the southern city of Mykolaiv, after reports emerged that the murderers had been released due to their alleged ties to the government. This happened in the aftermath of a number of cases, where children and other relatives of important officials from Yanukovych's entourage would be given milder sentences after committing crimes.

By January 2013, more than half of the ministers appointed by Yanukovych were either born in the Donbas region or made some crucial part of their careers there, and Yanukovych has been accused of "regional cronyism" for his staffing of police, judiciary, and tax services "all over Ukraine" with "Donbas people". Over 46% of the budget subventions for social and economic development was allotted to the Donbas region's Donetsk Oblast and Luhansk Oblast administrations – ₴0.62 billion ($76.2 million) versus ₴0.71 billion ($87.5 million) for the rest of the country. Yanukovych's political clan has been often described by Ukrainian publicists as a "Donetsk mafia".

Anders Åslund, a Swedish economist and Ukraine analyst, described the consolidation of Ukrainian economic power in the hands of a few "elite industrial tycoons", including Yanukovych's son Oleksandr. The exact distribution of wealth and precise weight of influence are difficult to gauge, but most of the country's richest men were afraid to cross the Yanukovich family, even in cases where their own economic interests favored an economically pro-EU Ukraine.

The Yanukovych family, a group of young businessmen described as "robber capitalists", have been buying up both public and private businesses at "rock bottom" prices available in the stagnating economic conditions brought on by Yanukovych's economic policies." According to Åslund, one notable exception to the Yanukovych family's influence was Petro Poroshenko, who is described as "uncommonly courageous", although his confectionery empire is less susceptible to ruin by the substantial power the Yanukovych family wielded in the heavy industry sectors located in Yanukovych's geographic power base of Donetsk.

Yanukovych had an estimated net worth of $12 billion, and has been accused by Ukrainian officials of misappropriating funds from Ukraine's treasury. Arseniy Yatsenyuk has claimed that treasury funds of up to $70 billion were transferred to foreign accounts during Yanukovych's presidency. Authorities in Switzerland, Austria and Liechtenstein froze the assets of Yanukovych and his son Oleksander on 28 February 2014 pending a money laundering investigation. Yanukovych has denied that he embezzled funds and has said that his alleged foreign accounts do not exist.

Corporate raiding was rampant in Ukraine under Yanukovych's presidency. During that period, at least 7,000 Ukrainian companies were attacked by the oligarchic clan of Yanukovych (the so-called "Yanukovych Families"). This number includes both cases of the so-called Family entering the corporate rights of the firms they like by illegal methods, and "assaults" in order to obtain "tribute" – that is, commercial gain. This is evidenced by the data of the Anti-Raider Union of Entrepreneurs of Ukraine. The victims of Yanukovych's raider methods were offered to pay a regular "tribute" in the amount of 30–50% of the company's profits – or to cede ownership of it.

According to Yanukovych's former ally Taras Chornovil, a group of officials and businessmen close to Yanukovych, composed of Serhiy Lyovochkin, Valeriy Khoroshkovskyi, Dmytro Firtash and Yuriy Boyko, were involved in deals with Russian president Putin and criminal boss Semion Mogilevich related to the purchase of Russian gas.

==== Mezhyhirya residence ====
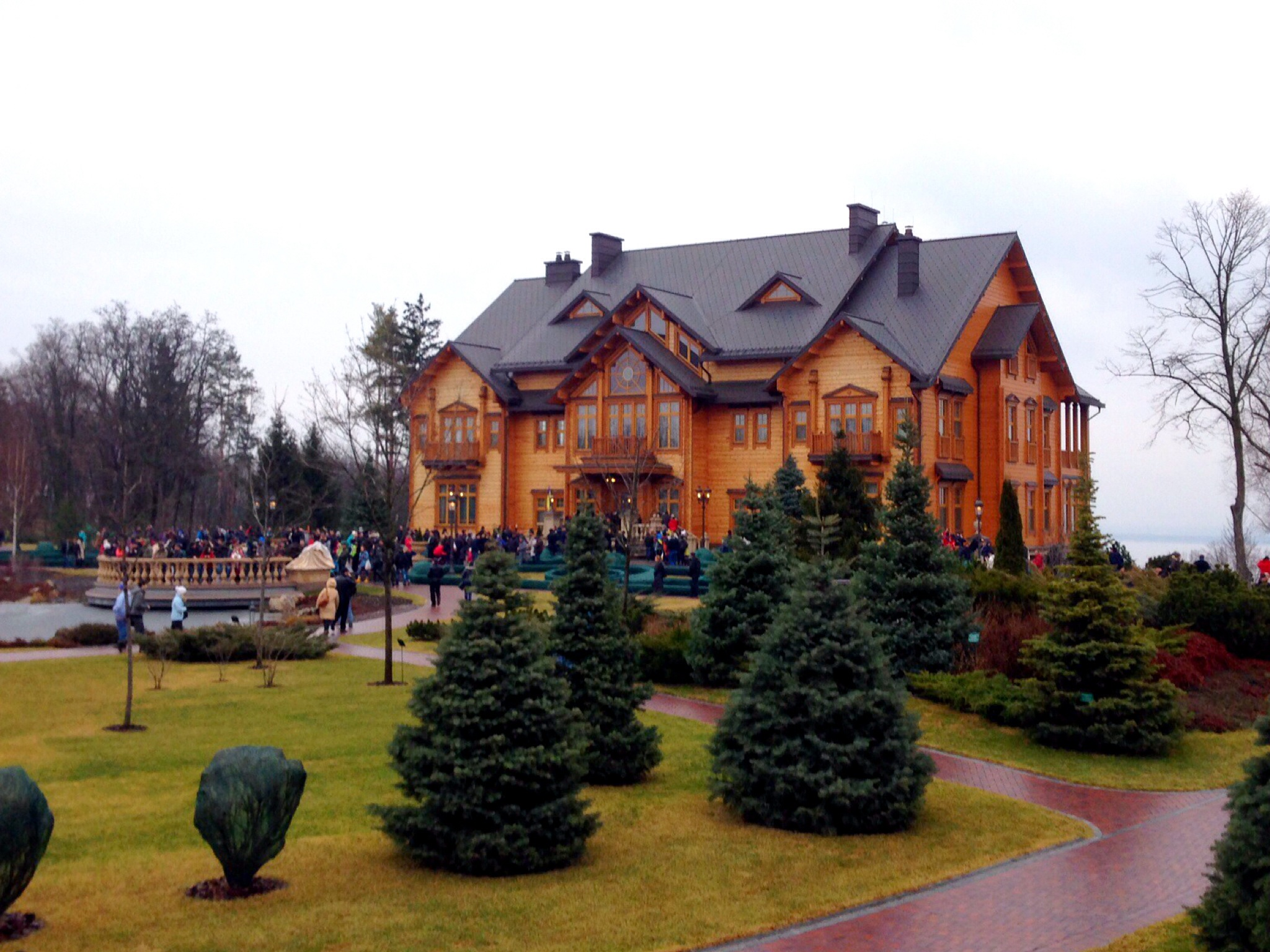
Yanukovych's "Honka" house in Mezhyhirya residence, 2014

Yanukovych abandoned his estate Mezhyhirya when he fled the capital.

Officially, Yanukovych claimed to own a modest home of roughly 250 square meters near the perimeter of the Mezhyhirya grounds, which he made available for journalist interviews. His actual residence, however, was a vast, enclosed estate of approximately 350 acres – nearly half the area of New York's Central Park.

He had acquired the property in 2007, according to critics, through a convoluted series of companies and transactions. Yanukovych did not reveal the price he paid, although he called it a "very serious price".

In a feature with photos on Yanukovych's Mezhyhirya mansion, Serhiy Leshchenko notes "For most of [Yanukovych's] career he was a public servant or parliament deputy, where his salary never exceeded 2000 US dollars per month." Under a photo showing the new home's ornate ceiling, Leschenko remarks, "In a country where 35% of the population live under poverty line, spending 100,000 dollars on each individual chandelier seems excessive, to say the least." Crowned with a pure copper roof, the mansion was the largest wooden structure ever created by Finnish log home builder Honka, whose representative suggested to Yanukovych that it be nominated for the Guinness Book of Records.

The property contained a private zoo, underground shooting range, 18-hole golf course, tennis, and bowling. After describing the mansion's complicated ownership scheme, the article author noted, "The story of Viktor Yanukovych and his residence highlights a paradox. Having completely rejected such European values as human rights and democracy, the Ukrainian president uses Europe as a place to hide his dirty money with impunity."

Documents recovered from Yanukovych's compound show among other expenses $800 medical treatment for fish, $14,500 spent on tablecloths, and a nearly 42 million dollar order for light fixtures. Also recovered were files on Yanukovych's perceived enemies, especially media members, including beating victim Tetyana Chornovol. The cost of monitoring the mass media was reportedly $5.7 million just for the month of December 2010.

Yanukovych told BBC Newsnight in June 2015 that stories that Mezhyhirya cost the Ukrainian taxpayer millions of dollars were "political technology and spin" and that the estate did not belong to him personally. He said that the ostriches in the residence's petting zoo "just happened to be there" and remarked "I supported the ostriches, what's wrong with that?".

=== Economy, finance and social sphere ===
==== Tax policy ====
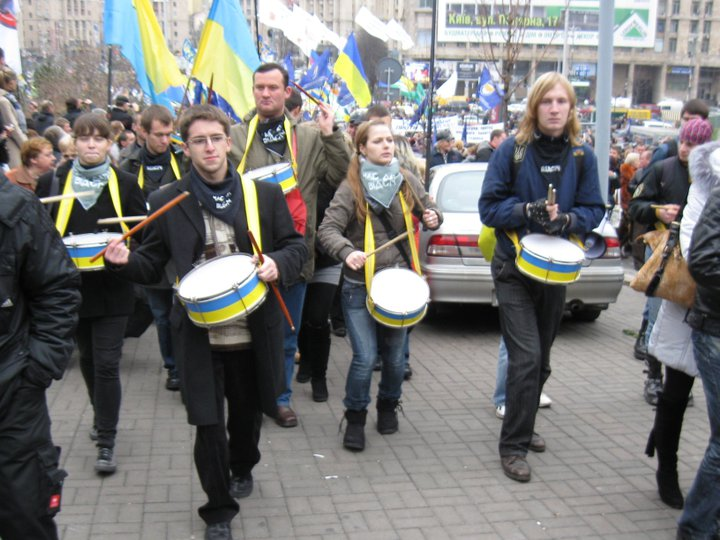
Vidsich activists protesting Yanukovych's tax reform in 2010

On 30 November 2010, Yanukovych vetoed a new tax code made by the Azarov Government and earlier approved by the Verkhovna Rada but protested against in rallies across Ukraine (one of the largest protests since the 2004 Orange Revolution). Yanukovych signed a new tax code on 3 December 2010.

==== Domestic spending vs. debt ====
Yanukovych's Party of Regions wanted to increase social benefits, and raise salaries and pensions. In late 2009, a law that raised the minimum wage and pensions was passed in the Ukrainian Parliament. As a result of this, the International Monetary Fund suspended its 2008–2009 Ukrainian financial crisis emergency lending programme. According to the IMF, the law breached promises to control spending. During the 2010 presidential campaign, Yanukovych had stated he would stand by this law.

According to Yulia Tymoshenko Bloc member of parliament Oleh Shevchuk, Yanukovych broke this election promise just three days after the 2010 presidential election when only two lawmakers of Yanukovych's Party of Regions supported a bill to raise pensions for low-incomes.

==== Social policy ====
A pension reform introduced under IMF pressure in 2010 foresaw a gradual increase in pension age: 55 to 60 years for women and 60 to 65 years for men. However, it failed to address the significant discrepancy between pensions received by privileged groups such as retired officials and pensions of ordinary citizens. During Yanukovych's rule no substantial taxation was imposed on real estate and luxury items, meanwhile price hikes and austerity measures seriously affected the lower stratum of the population.

Social benefit cuts for Chernobyl rescue workers, small business owners and veterans of the Soviet–Afghan War caused fierce protests in Kyiv in October/November 2011 by several thousand protesters.

=== Energy policy ===
==== Gas trade with Russia ====
According to Yanukovych, relations between Ukraine and Russia in the gas sector were to be built "according to the rules of the market". He saw the gas agreement signed in 2009 after the 2009 Russia-Ukraine gas dispute as very unprofitable for Ukraine and wanted to "initiate the discussion of the most urgent gas issues" after the 2010 presidential election. Yanukovych had promised before his election as Ukrainian President to "solve the issue" concerning the Russian Black Sea Fleet, currently stationed in the Ukrainian port Sevastopol, "in a way so that the interests of Russia or Ukraine would not be harmed".

This led to the April 2010 Ukrainian–Russian Naval Base for Natural Gas treaty. Yanukovych also promised to create a consortium that would allow Russia to jointly operate Ukraine's gas transportation network and pledged to help Russia build the South Stream natural gas pipeline. As of June 2010, both did not happen.

==== Downgrading uranium stock ====
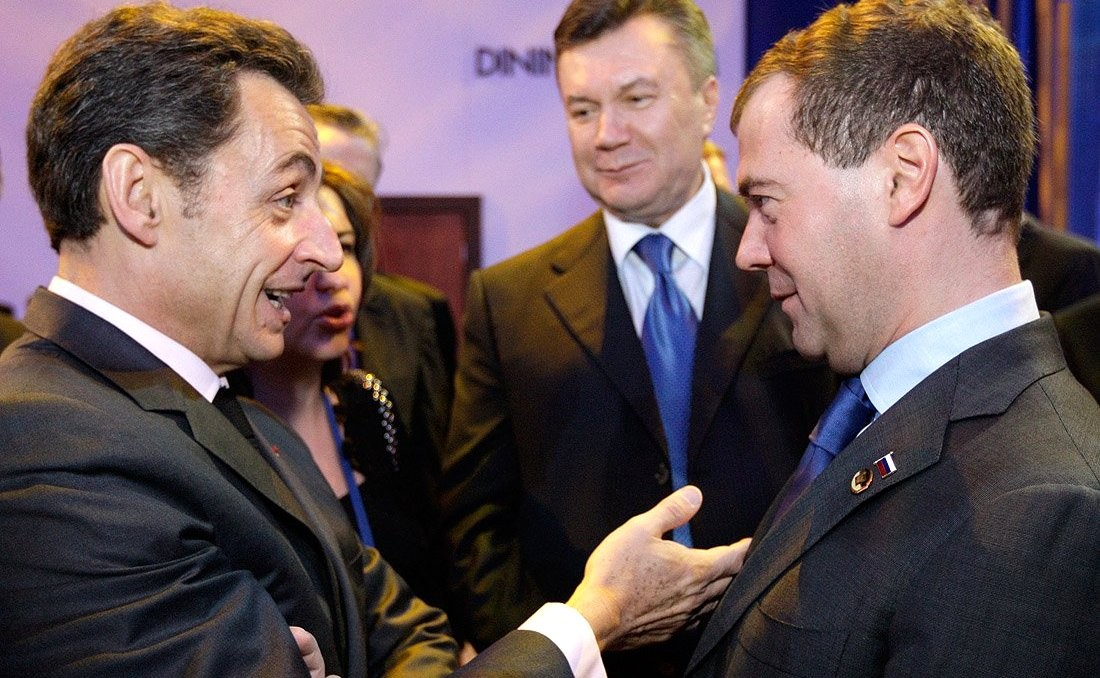
Yanukovych, Nicolas Sarkozy and Dmitry Medvedev before the beginning of the Nuclear Security Summit, 2010

During the 2010 Nuclear Security Summit, Yanukovych announced that Ukraine would give up its 90-kilogram stock of highly enriched uranium and convert its research reactors from highly enriched to low-enriched uranium. It intended to accomplish these goals by 2012.

=== Cultural and memorial policy ===
==== Appointments in the sphere of culture ====
Yanukovych's divisive stance in domestic issues, including controversial appointments and provocative decisions, led some analysts to call his policies Ukrainophobic. Dmytro Tabachnyk, who was appointed as minister of education under Yanukovych, was described by analysts as an "outspoken Ukrainophobe", and his policies were blamed for the decrease in prestige of the Ukrainian language. Hanna Herman, the deputy head of Yanukovych's presidential administration, acknowledged in an interview, that under his rule Ukrainian speakers were de-facto reduced to the position of second-rate citizens in comparison to Russophone Ukrainians.

==== Legacy of WW2 ====
Yanukovych stated that his "aim and dream" was to unify Ukraine, although in his opinion "there are already no borders between the East and West of the country today". He noted the importance of finding ways of reconciliation between Ukrainians fighting on opposite sides in World War II in his speech at the ceremony to mark Victory Day 2013. In this speech he also expressed confidence that Nazi and Soviet totalitarianism of the past would never return.

At the same time, Yanukovych's loyal majority in parliament engaged in actions which were evaluated as provocative and subversive to Ukrainian unity. On 21 April 2011 Verkhovna Rada adopted a proposal to hoist the Soviet red flag on all official buildings and sites during Victory Day celebrations alongside the national flag, despite the former banner's association with occupation, terror and genocide among many Ukrainians, especially in the western and central parts of the country. The decision was followed by clashes on 9 May in Lviv, which emerged between local nationalists and pro-Russian visitors from Odesa and Crimea. Yanukovych initially opted not to sign the decree on the red flag's official usage and condemned the violence in Lviv without blaming any of the sides in particular. On 20 May he finally signed the parliamentary decision on the official use of red flags, but on 17 June it was deemed unconstitutional by the Constitutional Court.

===== Holodomor and Soviet repressions =====
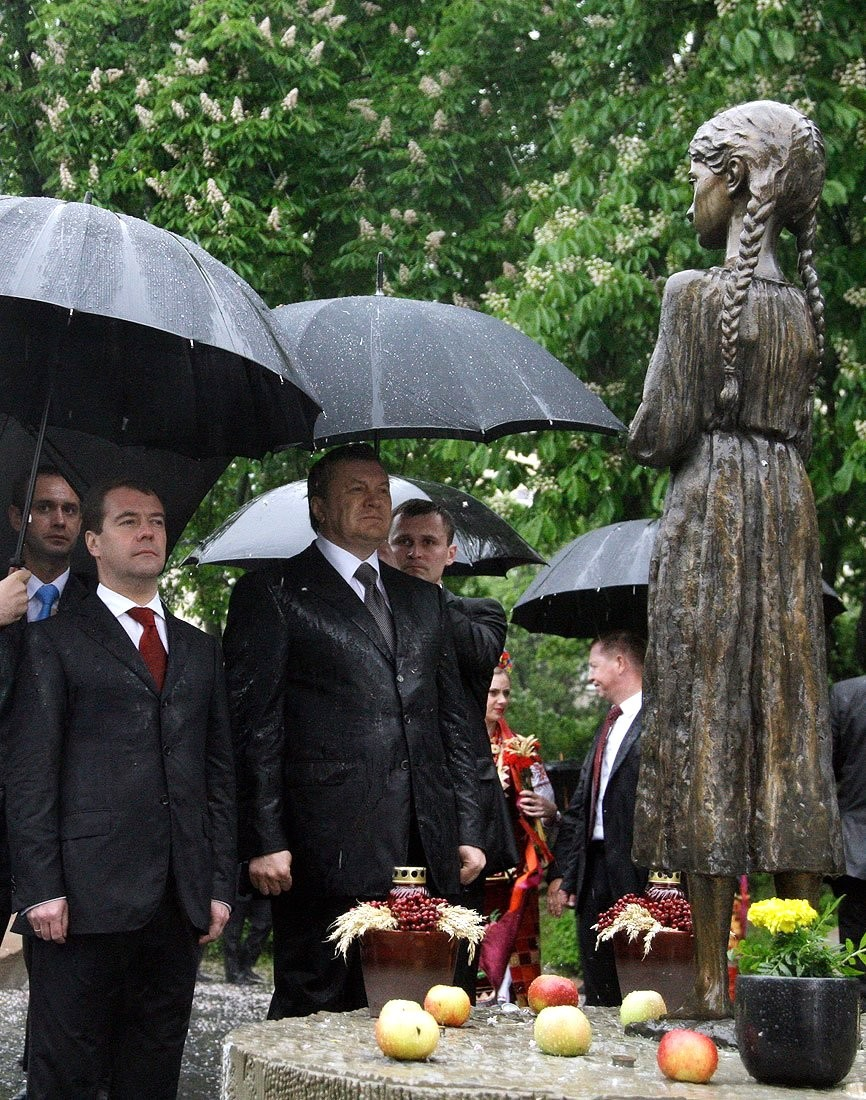
Yanukovych and Russian president Dmitry Medvedev on 17 May 2010 near Memorial to the Holodomor Victims in Kyiv

The Soviet famine of 1932–33, called "Holodomor" in Ukrainian, claimed up to 10 million lives, mostly in Ukraine but also in some other parts of the Soviet Union, as peasants' food stocks were forcibly removed by Stalin's regime via the NKVD secret police.

Yanukovych's stance on the Holodomor was: "Holodomor took place, was denounced and the international society gave an evaluation of the famine, but it was never labeled as a genocide of the Ukrainian people. Ukraine's attempts to do so by blaming one of our neighbors are unjust." "The Holodomor was in Ukraine, Russia, Belarus and Kazakhstan. It was the result of the policies of Stalin's totalitarian regime." In 2003, he supported then President Kuchma's position that the Holodomor famine was genocide against Ukrainians.

Yanukovych's press service claims that he does not approve of crimes of the KGB and their predecessors in Soviet times, however, in 2002, he wrote a foreword to a book by two ex-KGB agents endorsing the KGB and its predecessors, stating that the NKVD and Cheka "firmly stood on guard over the interests of our people and the state" and praised them for launching "a struggle against political extremism, sabotage and criminal activities." He also wrote that "Donbas Chekists under any conditions have done and do their high duty with honor".

===== Russian as an official language =====
Yanukovych stated in the past that he wanted Russian to become the second state language in Ukraine. Currently Ukrainian is the only official language of Ukraine. On the other hand, he stated at a meeting with Taras Shevchenko National Prize winners in Kyiv on 9 March 2010 that "Ukraine will continue to promote the Ukrainian language as its only state language".

In a newspaper interview during the 2010 Ukrainian presidential election campaign, he stated that the status of Russian in Ukraine "is too politicized" and said that if elected president in 2010 he would "have a real opportunity to adopt a law on languages, which implements the requirements of the European Charter of regional languages". He said that this law would need 226 votes in the Ukrainian parliament (half of the votes instead of two-thirds of the votes needed to change the constitution of Ukraine) and that voters told him that the current status of Russian in Ukraine created "problems in the hospital, school, university, in the courts, in the office".

Effective in August 2012, a new law on regional languages entitles any local language spoken by at least a 10% minority be declared official within that area. On 23 February 2014, following the Revolution of Dignity, a bill was passed by the parliament which would have abolished the law on regional languages, making Ukrainian the sole state language at all levels. This bill was blocked by acting president Turchynov, until a replacement bill is ready. The 2012 law was ruled unconstitutional and was struck down by the Constitutional Court of Ukraine in 2018, 4 years after the Euromaidan.

===== Religion =====
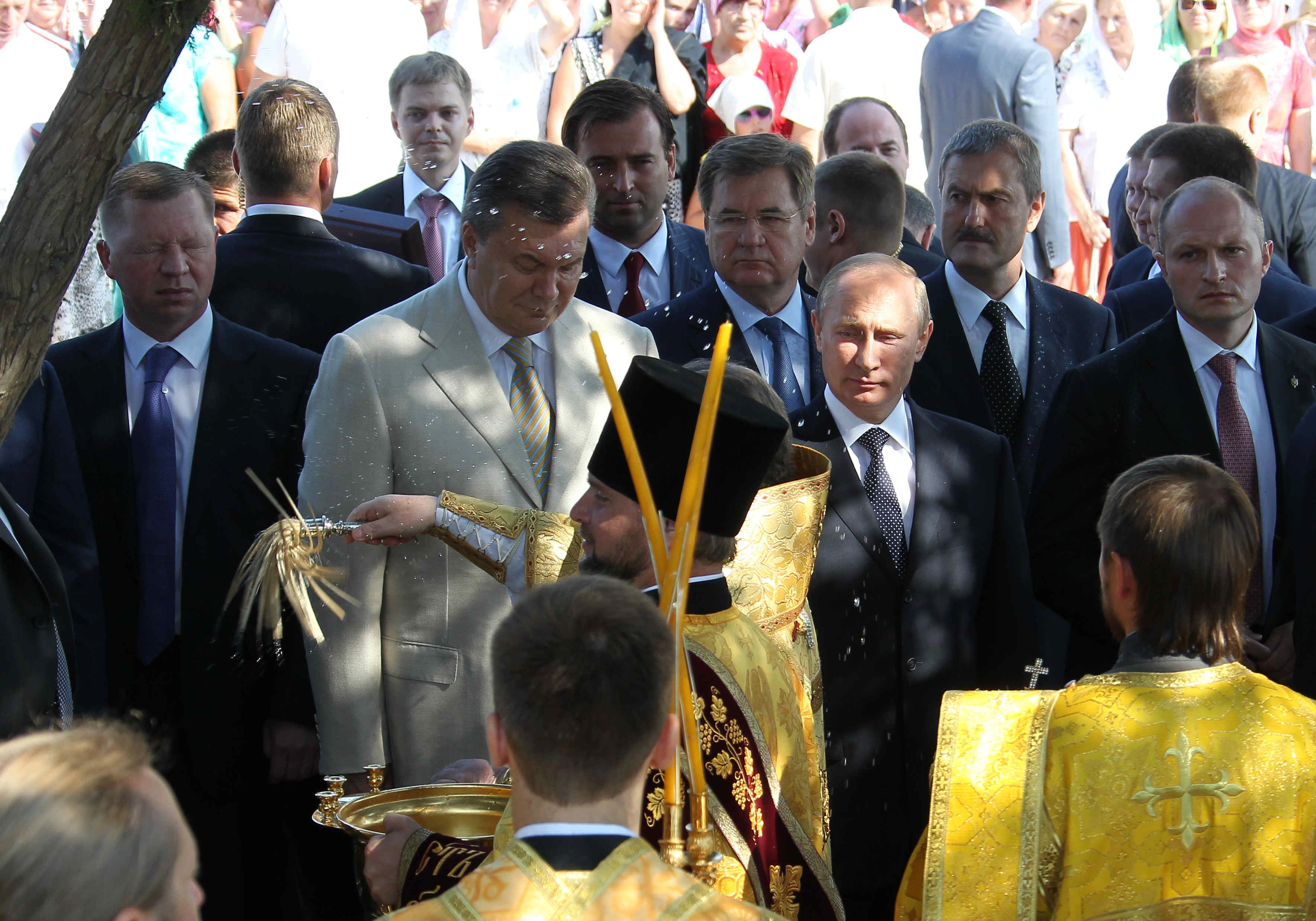
Yanukovych and Putin attending a moleben of the Russian Orthodox Church in Chersonesus, Crimea, 2013

In a late July 2013 speech Yanukovych stated: "All churches and religious organizations are equal for the state. We respect the choice of our citizens and guarantee everyone's Constitutional right to freedom of religion. We will not allow the use of churches and religious organizations by some political forces for their narrow interests. This also refers to foreign centres through which religious organizations sometimes seek to affect the internal political situation in Ukraine. This is a matter of the state's national security".

Under Yanukovych's presidency instances of intimidation against Ukrainian priests and believers, aimed with forcing them to join the Moscow Patriarchate favoured by the president, were reported.

=== Foreign policy ===
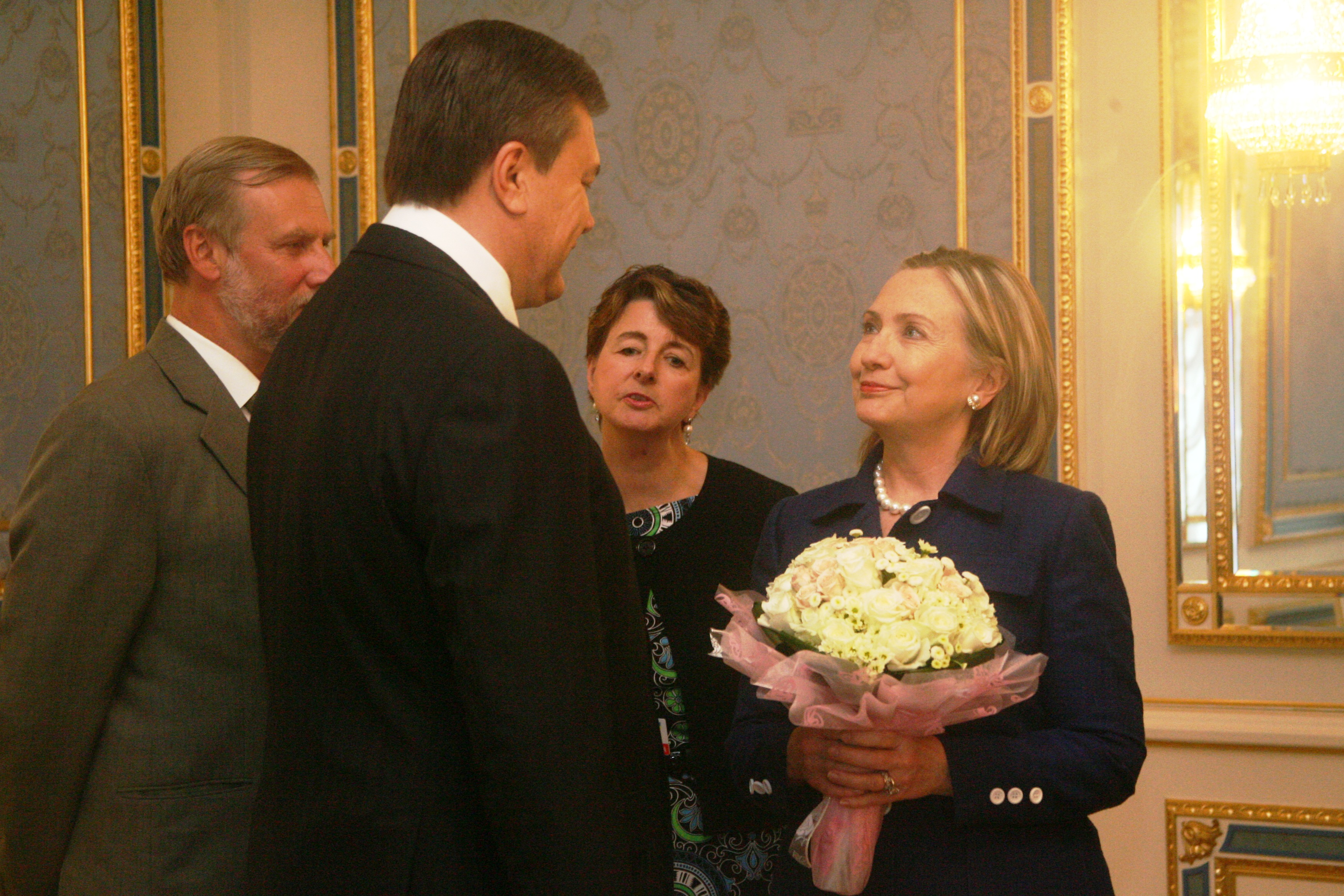
U.S. Secretary of State Hillary Clinton is greeted by Yanukovych in Kyiv, Ukraine, on 2 July 2010.

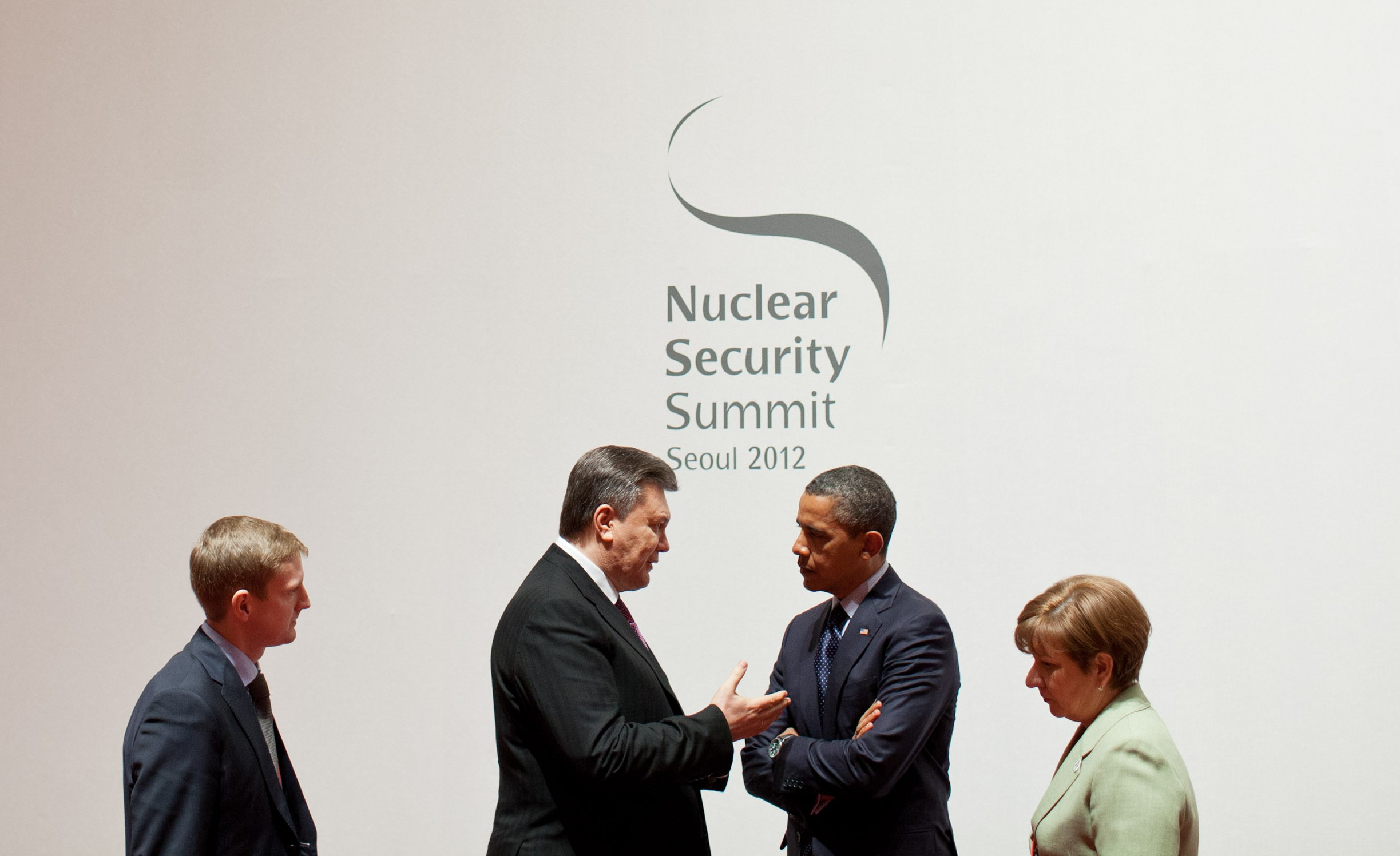
Barack Obama talks with President Viktor Yanukovych during a pull aside at the 2012 Nuclear Security Summit at the Coex Center in Seoul.

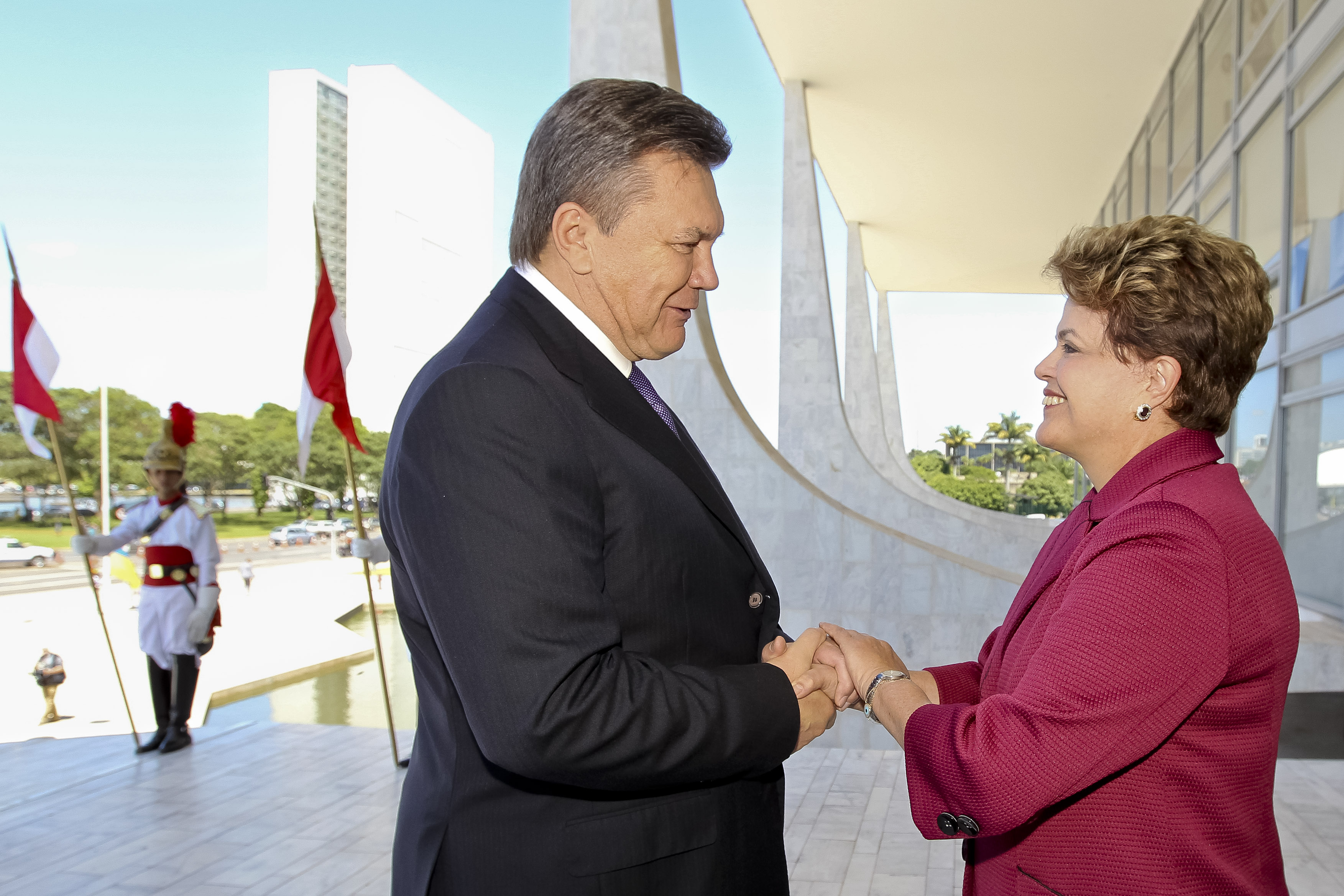
Brazilian president Dilma Rousseff greets Yanukovych upon his arrival to the Planalto Palace in Brasília, Brazil, on 25 October 2011.

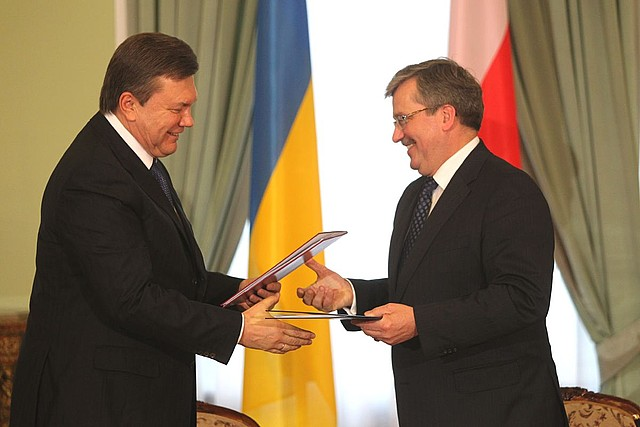
Yanukovych with Polish president Bronisław Komorowski, 3 February 2011

==== Relations with EU and NATO ====
Yanukovych said, "Ukraine's integration with the EU remains our strategic aim", with a "balanced policy, which will protect our national interests both on our eastern border – I mean with Russia – and of course with the European Union". According to Yanukovych, Ukraine must be a "neutral state" which should be part of a "collective defence system which the European Union, NATO and Russia will take part in." Yanukovych wants Ukraine to "neither join NATO nor the CSTO". He stated on 7 January 2010 that Ukraine is ready to consider an initiative by Dmitry Medvedev on the creation of a new Europe collective security system stating "And we're ready to back Russia's and France's initiatives".

Yanukovych stated during the 2010 presidential election-campaign that the current level of Ukraine's cooperation with NATO was sufficient and that the question of the country's accession to the alliance was therefore not urgent. "The Ukrainian people don't currently support Ukraine's entry to NATO and this corresponds to the status that we currently have. We don't want to join any military bloc". On 27 May 2010 Yanukovych stated he considered Ukraine's relations with NATO as a partnership, "And Ukraine can't live without this [partnership], because Ukraine is a large country".

Yanukovych's first foreign visit was to Brussels to visit the president of the European Council, Herman Van Rompuy, and the EU Foreign Affairs chief, Catherine Ashton. During the visit Yanukovych stated that there would be no change to Ukraine's status as a member of the NATO outreach program.

==== Relations with Russia ====
In comparison to his predecessors, Yanukovych's foreign policy was characterized by a much stronger pro-Moscow orientation, which included signing of one-sided deals with Russia and rose the question of a possible Russian intelligence lobby in the Ukrainian government.

During his second foreign visit to Moscow in March, Yanukovych vowed to end years of acrimony with Russia, saying that ties between Russia and Ukraine "should never be the way they were for the past five years". He indicated that he was open to compromise with Russia on the Black Sea Fleet's future (this led to the April 2010 Ukrainian–Russian Naval Base for Natural Gas treaty), and reiterated that Ukraine would remain a "European, non-aligned state", referring to NATO membership. Russian president Medvedev (April 2010) and Russian prime minister Vladimir Putin (June 2010) soon stated they noticed a big improvement in relations with Ukraine since Yanukovych's presidency.

Yanukovych rejected accusations that improvement of Ukrainian-Russian relations harmed relations with the European Union. "Our policy is directed to protection of our national interests. We do not live in a fairy tale and understand that our partners also defend their interests". In February 2012, Yanukovych stated, referring to relations with Russia, "It is not wise to fall asleep next to a big bear".

On 3 June 2010, the Ukrainian parliament excluded, in a bill written by Yanukovych, with 226 votes, Ukrainian membership of any military bloc, but allowed for co-operation with military alliances such as NATO. A day later Yanukovych stated that the recognition of the independence of Abkhazia, South Ossetia and Kosovo violates international law, "I have never recognized Abkhazia, South Ossetia or Kosovo's independence. This is a violation of international law".

In May 2011 Ukraine's foreign ministry called its Russian counterpart to tone down "anti-Ukrainian hysteria" in the Russian media and blamed some Russian politicians of attempting to "divide peoples". In June 2011 a "minor clash" emerged between Ukrainian and Russian PACE deputies in Strasbourg after the latter sponsored a resolution blaming Ukraine and four other European countries of "Neo-Nazism" and "right-wing radicalism". Both members of the Ukrainian opposition and MPs from the governing Party of Regions spoke against the document.

==== European integration ====
Before his election Yanukovych stated that he wanted to create a free trade zone and visa-free regime with the EU as soon as possible. On 22 November 2010, the European Council and Ukraine announced "an action plan for Ukraine toward the establishment of a visa-free regime for short-stay travel". In May 2011, Yanukovych stated that he would strive for Ukraine to join the EU. Yanukovych's stance towards integration with the EU, according to The Economist, led him to be "seen in Moscow as a traitor", a reversal of the 2004 presidential election where Moscow openly supported Yanukovych.

=== Crimean naval base ===
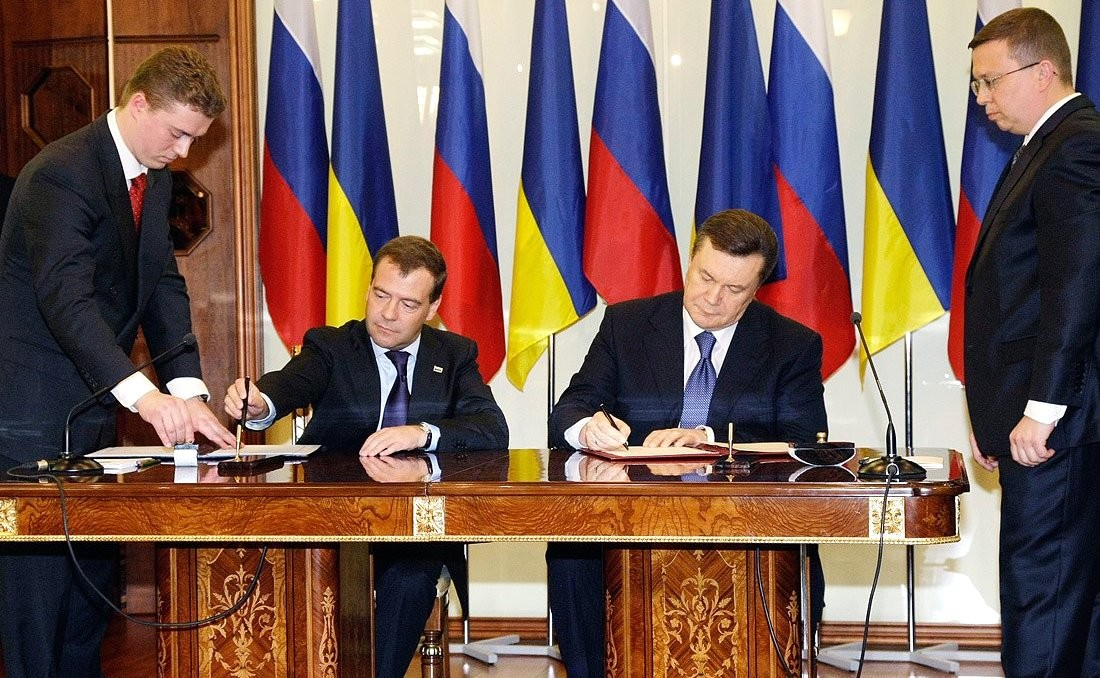
Yanukovych signing the Kharkiv Pact with Russian president Dmitry Medvedev, 2010

On 21 April 2010, in Kharkiv, Yanukovych and Medvedev signed the 2010 Ukrainian–Russian Naval Base for Natural Gas treaty, whereby the Russian lease on naval facilities in Crimea would be extended beyond 2017 by 25 years with an additional 5-year renewal option (to 2042–47) in exchange for a multi-year discounted contract to provide Ukraine with Russian natural gas. This treaty was approved by both the Russian and Ukrainian parliaments (Verkhovna Rada) on 27 April 2010.

On 22 April 2010, Yanukovych stated he did not rule out the possibility of holding a referendum on the stationing of the Russian Black Sea Fleet in Ukraine after the necessary legislative framework is adopted for this in future. Yanukovych did plan to hold plebiscites also on other subjects. Opposition members accused Yanukovych of "selling out national interests".

According to Yanukovych the main priority of his foreign policy was to integrate Ukraine "into the European mainstream", while improving relations with Russia. According to Yanukovych the only way to lower the state budget deficit, as requested by the International Monetary Fund, while protecting pensioners and minimal wages was to extend the Russian Navy lease in Crimea in exchange for cheaper natural gas.

=== 2012 parliamentary elections ===
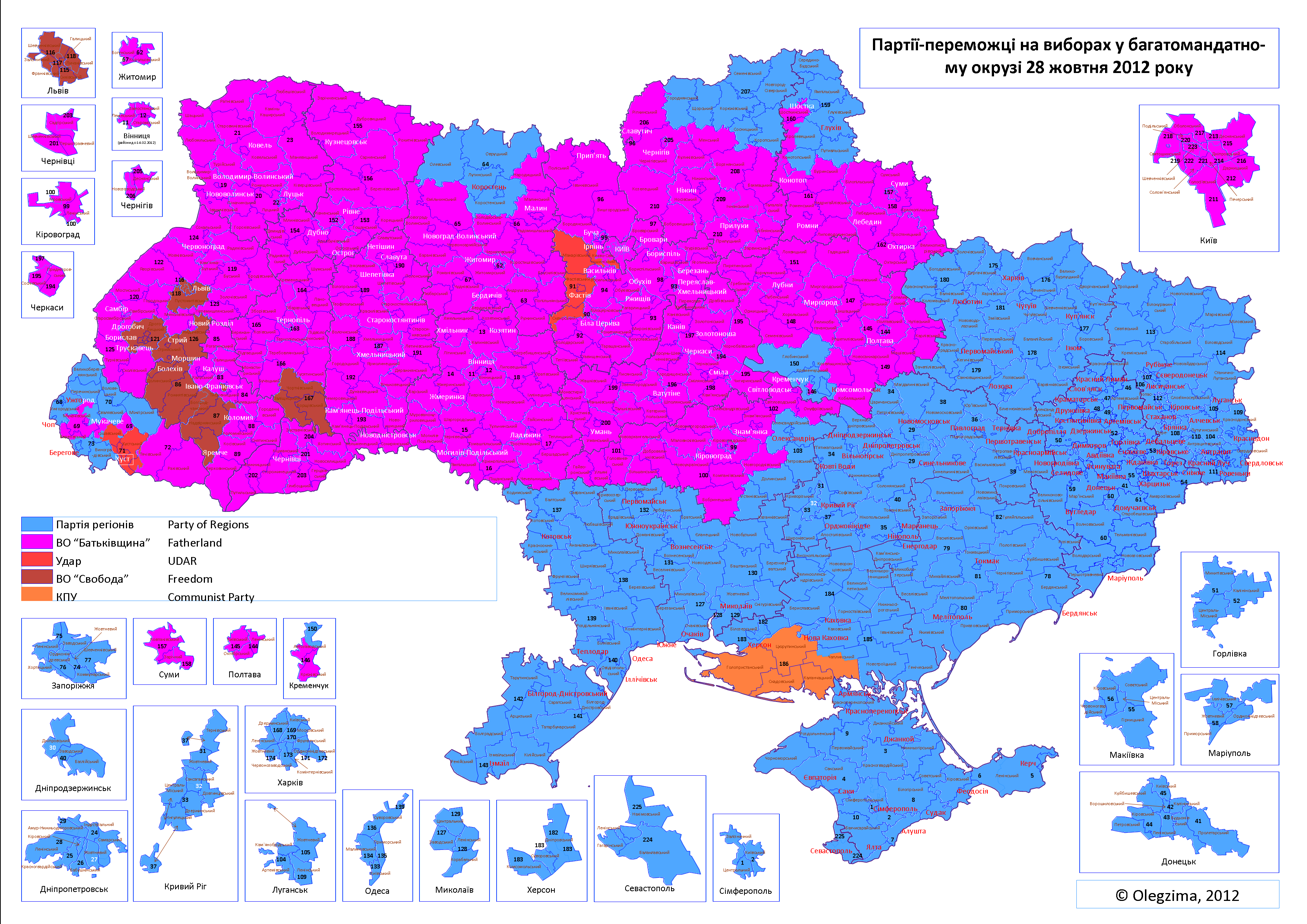
The results of the 2012 parliamentary election. Yanukovych's Party of Regions is in blue.

On 17 November 2011, the Ukrainian parliament adopted a new electoral law, which re-established the mixed system, under which half of the deputies were elected according to first-past-the-post principle, and half on the base of proportional representation. The law banned electoral blocs from participating in the election. Both amendments were claimed by analysts to bring additional advantage to the governing Party of Regions. The project of the law had been criticized by international watchdogs as being detrimental to political climate in Ukraine.

In advance to the 2012 Ukrainian parliamentary election Yanukovych predicted that "social standards will continue to grow" and "improvement of administrative services system will continue". Yanukovych announced $2 billion worth of pension and other welfare increases on 7 March 2012. In the October election Yanukovych's party of Regions won the poll with 30% against 25.5% for imprisoned Yulia Tymoshenko's Fatherland party.

== Downfall ==
=== Euromaidan protests ===
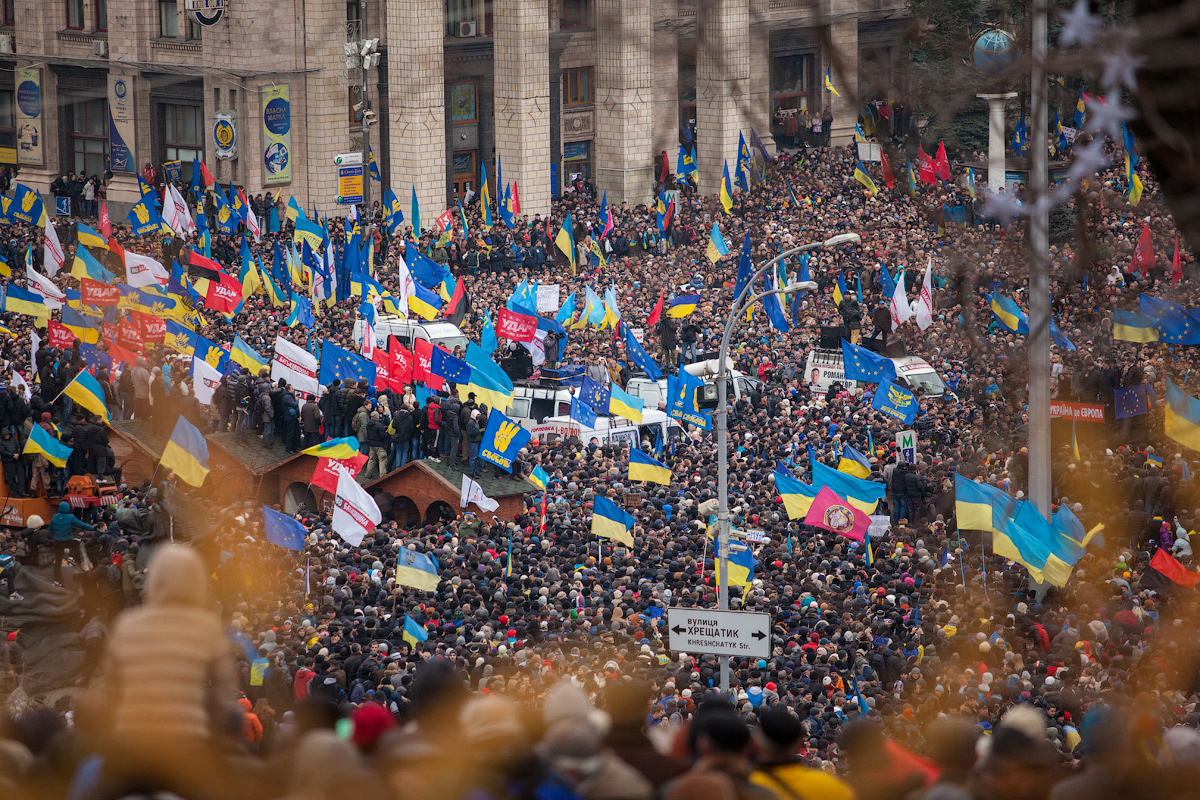
Mass protests in Kyiv, December 2013

Since 2012, Ukraine and the EU had been negotiating a free trade and association agreement. In 2013, the Ukrainian Parliament overwhelmingly approved finalizing the agreement with the EU, and Yanukovych urged parliament to adopt laws so that Ukraine would meet the EU's criteria and be able to sign the agreement in November 2013.

Russia, however, put pressure on Ukraine to reject the EU Association Agreement. In August 2013, Russia began restricting Ukrainian imports, which Ukraine's opposition parties described as "a trade war" to pressure the country not to sign the agreement. The agreement was to be finalized at a summit in the Lithuanian capital Vilnius. On 21 November, a week before the summit, Yanukovych suddenly announced he was pulling out of the agreement, and instead strengthening economic ties with Russia. Jovita Neliupšienė, foreign policy aide to Lithuania's president Dalia Grybauskaitė, said Yanukovych had called her to say he had changed his mind due to what she called Russian "economic pressure and blackmail". The Lithuanian president's office said Russia had threatened Ukraine with huge trade losses and job losses if it signed the EU agreement. Russia also offered more favorable trade terms than those offered by the EU and IMF.

This sparked protests at Independence Square (Maidan Nezalezhnosti) in the center of Kyiv, which became known as 'Euromaidan'. The protesters, united under the Maidan People's Union, demanded Yanukovych fulfill his pledge to sign the Agreement or else resign. They also called for a return to the 2004 Constitution of Ukraine to give more power to parliament over the president. The scope of the protests soon widened. Protesters opposed what they saw as widespread government corruption, abuse of power, human rights violations, and the influence of oligarchs.

During the 'Maidan uprising', Independence Square was a huge protest camp occupied by thousands of protesters and protected by makeshift barricades. It had kitchens, first aid posts and broadcasting facilities, as well as stages for speeches, lectures, debates and performances. Police assaulted the camp several times, causing further anger.

Yanukovych has been accused, by Amnesty International among others, of using the Berkut to threaten, attack, and torture protesters. The Berkut, later disbanded on 25 February 2014, were a special police force under his personal command and were accused of defending Russian interests.

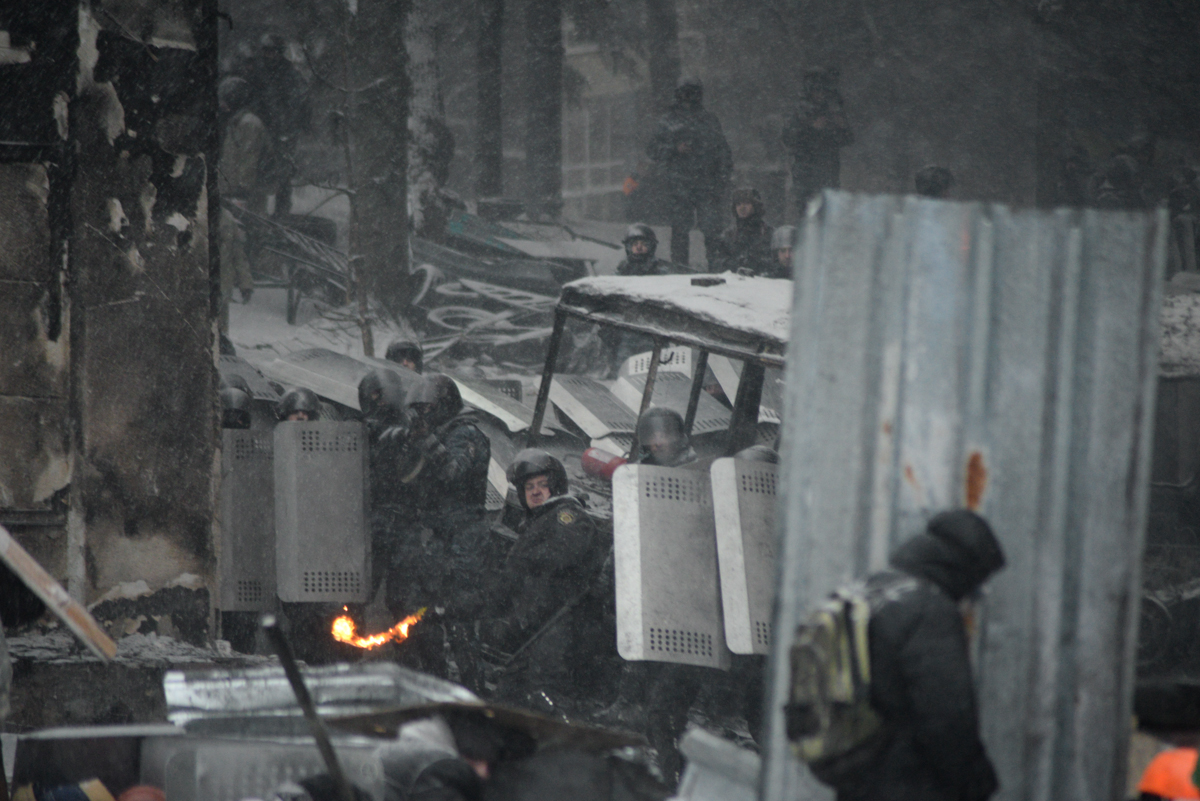
Anti-riot police forces consisting of Internal Troops holding protective position and Berkut special policemen shooting in Kyiv riots, January 2014

Violence escalated after 16 January 2014, when Yanukovych signed draconian Anti-Protest Laws. The first protesters were killed in fierce clashes with police on Hrushevsky Street on 19–22 January. In response, demonstrators occupied provincial government buildings in many regions of Ukraine. On 28 January, parliament repealed nine of the 12 restrictive laws. That day, Mykola Azarov, the prime minister of Ukraine, resigned "for the sake of a peaceful resolution" to the civil unrest.

The deadliest clashes were on 18–20 February, which saw the most severe violence in Ukraine since it regained independence. Thousands of protesters advanced from the Maidan in Kyiv towards parliament, led by activists with shields and helmets. They were fired on by police snipers. Almost 100 protesters were killed, as were 13 police officers.

In June 2015 interview with BBC Newsnight Yanukovych stated that he never ordered the security forces to open fire, but he also said he had not done enough to prevent bloodshed. He said "the members of the security forces fulfilled their duties according to existing laws. They had the right to use weapons."

=== Removal from presidency ===
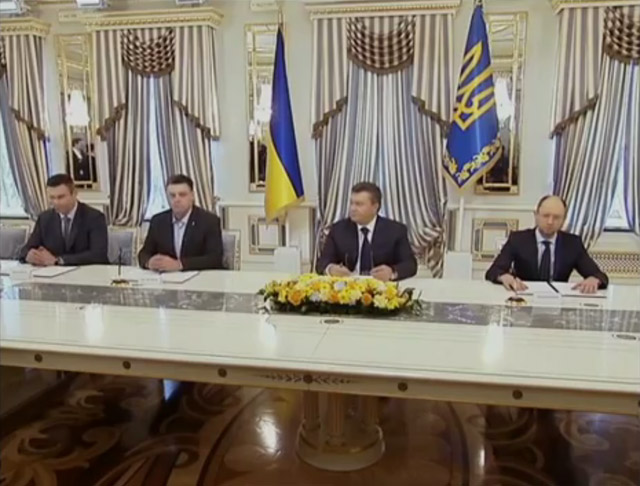
Yanukovych signing the Agreement on settlement of political crisis in Ukraine with representatives of the opposition, 21 February 2014

On Friday 21 February 2014, Yanukovych and the leaders of the parliamentary opposition signed an agreement to bring about an interim unity government including the opposition, reinstatement of the constitution of 2004 and early elections before December at the latest. That day, the Ukrainian parliament voted 386–0 to reinstate the 2004 Constitution of Ukraine. During the afternoon, police abandoned central Kyiv, allowing protesters to take control. Yanukovych secretly fled the city that evening without signing the measure that would reinstate the 2004 constitution he agreed to ratify in the agreement.

On Saturday 22 February, Yanukovych could not be found, and parliament was not informed of his whereabouts. Parliament held an emergency session. The chairman of parliament, Volodymyr Rybak, resigned that morning. Parliament then elected Oleksandr Turchynov as chairman. Under the 2004 Constitution, which since the day before was again in force, the president's powers would transfer to the chairman in case the president should resign or be unable to fulfill his duties. The later constitution had stated the president's powers would transfer to the prime minister. The acting prime minister, Serhiy Arbuzov, was also missing.

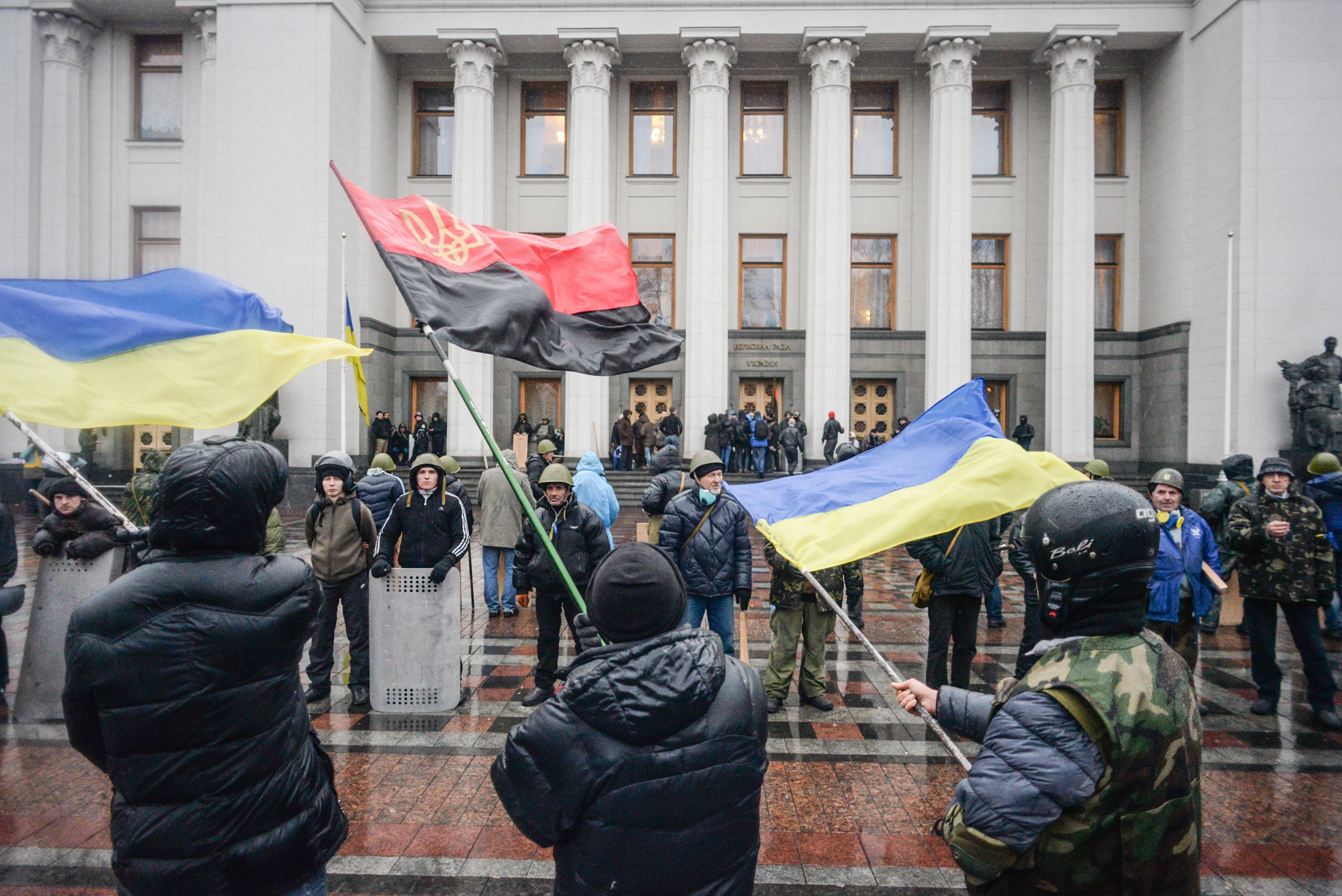
Pro-revolution activists outside parliament on 22 February 2014

In the afternoon, the Rada voted 328–0 (about 73% of its 447 members) to remove Yanukovych from his post and to schedule an early presidential election for 25 May. The resolution stated that Yanukovych had withdrawn from fulfilling his constitutional duties, "which threatens the governance of the state, the territorial integrity and sovereignty of Ukraine", and cited "circumstances of extreme urgency". The resolution to remove Yanukovych was supported by all opposition parties: 86 deputies of Batkivshchyna (Fatherland Party), 41 deputies of the Ukrainian Democratic Alliance for Reform (UDAR), 36 deputies of Svoboda (Freedom Party), 30 deputies of the Communist Party, as well as 99 independents. Furthermore, 36 deputies of Yanukovych's Party of Regions voted for his removal. There were no votes against. Of the remaining deputies, 115 were absent and 6 did not vote. Under the 2004 constitution, parliament chairman Turchynov became acting president.

The vote came an hour after Yanukovych said in a televised address that he would not resign. He subsequently declared himself to still be "the legitimate head of the Ukrainian state elected in a free vote by Ukrainian citizens", and maintained that his removal was a coup d'état.

Political scientist Maria Popova says that "the solution that took place within the Rada was more legitimate than any strictly legal solution that could have come from the Constitutional Court". Parliament did not vote to impeach the president, which would have involved formally charging Yanukovych with a crime, a review of the charge by the Constitutional Court of Ukraine, and a three-fourths majority vote in parliament—at least 338 votes in favor. The Ukrainian Constitution at this time (like many other constitutions) did not provide any stipulation about how to remove a president who is neither dead nor incapacitated, but is nonetheless absent or not fulfilling his duties. The lack of such provisions was a lacuna. Viktor Yanukovych fled from Ukraine to Russia. The title of the resolution was «Resolution of the Verkhovna Rada of Ukraine. On self-removal of the President of Ukraine from the exercise of constitutional powers and appointment of extraordinary elections of the President of Ukraine».

On the same day that parliament removed Yanukovych from office, it voted to authorize the release of his rival Yulia Tymoshenko from a prison hospital. She had been imprisoned since 2011, in what many saw as political payback by Yanukovych. Her release had been an unmet condition for Ukraine's signing of a European Union trade pact.

Two days later, Ukraine's parliament dismissed five judges of the Constitutional Court for allegedly violating their oaths, who were then investigated for alleged malpractice.

=== Disavowal by own party ===
Yanukovych was soon disowned by the Party of Regions. In a statement issued by Oleksandr Yefremov, parliamentary faction leader, the party and its members "strongly condemn[ed] the criminal orders that led to human victims, an empty state treasury, huge debts, shame before the eyes of the Ukrainian people and the entire world."

=== Flight to Russia ===
Yanukovych left Kyiv during the night of 21–22 February 2014 and initially moved to Kharkiv. According to then governor of Kharkiv Oblast, Mykhailo Dobkin, Yanukovych had intended to make his stay in Kharkiv look like "just another presidential inspection tour" and according to Dobkin, "was desperate to make it look like he wasn't running away". Yanukovych asked Dobkin to "pick out a few factories for me to visit"; the director of state-owned industrial giant Turboatom declined even to take his call (according to Dobkin). Dobkin met Yanukovych at Kharkiv International Airport after midnight. According to Dobkin at that time Yanukovych "thought this was a temporary difficulty" since he believed that the 21 February agreement could still provide for a graceful departure from office later in the year. Dobkin's impression of Yanukovych (during this meeting) was "a guy on another planet".

Yanukovych flew from Kharkiv by helicopter to Donetsk, where he boarded a business jet, but the airport authorities refused to give the plane permission to take off. Then he met coal and steel baron Rinat Akhmetov, who had financed Yanukovych before, at his residence. Akhmetov advised him to resign. Yanukovych with his chief of staff and his bodyguards tried to reach Crimea, 250 miles away. His chief of security later testified before a court that when he learned he was heading into an ambush outside Melitopol, he appealed to colleagues from Russia’s Federal Guard Service for help. Three Mil Mi-8 helicopters picked them up and flew them to the town of Yeysk, on the Russian coast of the Sea of Azov. From there they took a plane for Crimea. Yanukovych had to make one more stop in Anapa because of a technical problem with the plane and arrived on the air base of the Black Sea Fleet outside of Simferopol. In Crimea, Yanukovych discovered that Ukrainian authorities were looking to apprehend him. Together with his inner circle, he decided to leave Ukraine and boarded a Russian warship on the night of 23 February. In a propaganda film shown on the first anniversary of Crimea’s annexation, Putin recounted how he had personally overseen the extraction of Yanukovych and that Russian military units had been activated to bring him out "by land, by sea, and by air."

In a press conference several days after leaving Kyiv, Yanukovych claimed that at the time he did not "flee anywhere", but that his car was shot at "by automatic rifles" as he left Kyiv for Kharkiv "to meet the representatives of local parties" and he was then forced to move around Ukraine amid fears for the safety of himself and his family. He said "When we arrived in Kharkiv, on the early morning of 22 February, the security service started to receive information that radical groups were arriving in Kharkiv."

Following his flight from Kyiv, protesters gained entry to Yanukovych's Mezhyhirya Residence, as police and security had abandoned their posts. Ukrainians were amazed at the opulence and extravagance of what they found at Mezhyhirya, including a private zoo, a fleet of cars, and a large boat.

On 26 February 2014, Russian media company RBC reported Yanukovych's presence in Moscow. According to RBC sources, Yanukovych arrived at the Radisson Royal Hotel, Moscow (often referred by its former name as "Hotel Ukraine") on the night of 25 February 2014. Then he moved to the Barvikha Sanatorium, the health resort of the president of Russia in Moscow Oblast. RosBusinessConsulting also reported sightings of Viktor Pshonka, a former Prosecutor General of Ukraine in the hall of Radisson Royal Hotel. The Press Secretary of the department that manages Barvikha Sanatorium denied the report, stating that he had no information of Yanukovych settled in Barvikha Sanatorium.

According to an April 2014 poll conducted by the Razumkov Centre, only 4.9% of respondents would have liked to see Yanukovych return to the presidency.

The EU association agreement was signed on 29 May 2014, after his removal.

== Exile ==
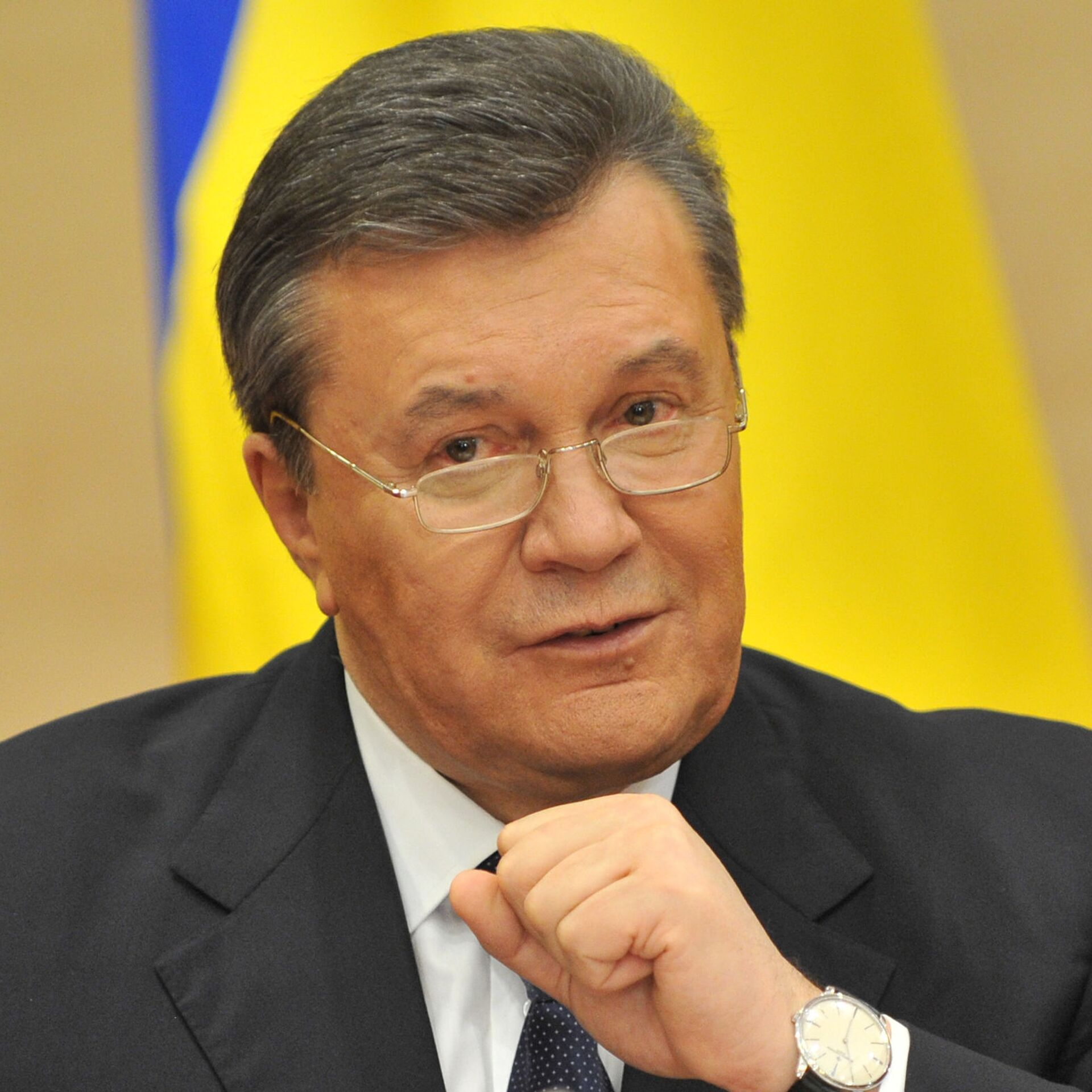
Yanukovych during a post-Maidan press conference in Rostov-on-Don, Russia, February 2014

According to Russian politician Oleg Mitvol, Yanukovych bought a house in Barvikha in Moscow Oblast for $52 million on 26 February 2014.

On 27 February 2014, a report stated that Yanukovych had asked the authorities of the Russian Federation to guarantee his personal security in the territory of Russia, a request that they accepted. Yanukovych claimed that the decisions of the Ukrainian parliament adopted "in the atmosphere of extremist threats" are unlawful and he remains the "legal president of Ukraine". He accused the opposition of violation of the 21 February agreements and asked the armed forces of Ukraine not to intervene in the crisis. The exact whereabouts of Yanukovych when he made this statement was unclear. In a June 2015 interview with BBC's Newsnight he thanked Russian President Vladimir Putin for "saving his life".

In an April 2014 poll by Kyiv International Institute of Sociology those polled in southern and eastern Ukraine were generally split on the legitimacy of the then Yatsenyuk government and parliament, but a majority in all regions agreed that Yanukovych was not the legal president of the country.

On 3 October 2014, several news agencies reported that according to a Facebook post made by the aide to the Ukrainian Interior Minister, Anton Gerashchenko, Viktor Yanukovych had been granted Russian citizenship by a "secret decree" of Putin. On the same day, Russian presidential spokesman Dmitry Peskov said that he didn't know anything about this.

On 26 November 2015, Yanukovych received a temporary asylum certificate in Russia for one year; later extended until November 2017. In October 2017, this was extended for another year. According to his lawyer Yanukovych did not consider acquiring Russian citizenship or a permanent residence permits but "Only a temporary shelter for returning to the territory of Ukraine". In 2017, Russian media suggested that Yanukovych is apparently living in Bakovka near Moscow, in a residence owned by Russian Ministry of Internal Affairs.

=== Position of Yanukovych on his removal ===
In a press conference in Rostov-on-Don on 28 February 2014, Yanukovych stated that all his possessions had been legally declared and accounted for. The same day Swiss and Austrian authorities blocked Yanukovych's and his associates' assets, and launched a corruption investigation.

Yanukovych said that an "armed coup" had taken place in Ukraine, and that he was still the legitimate president because there had been no impeachment, resignation, or death. On 11 March he claimed he should return to Ukraine as soon as this was possible. (Note: According to the Ukrainian constitution, the state language of Ukraine is Ukrainian. Russian is however widely spoken, especially in eastern and southern Ukraine.)

Yanukovych stated he had been able to escape to Russia "thanks to patriotic officers who did their duty and helped me stay alive". In the press conference he stated that he was still President of Ukraine and "I can't find words to characterise this new authority. These are people who advocate violence – the Ukrainian parliament is illegitimate". He described the new Ukrainian authorities as "pro-fascist thugs" and that they "represent the absolute minority of the population of Ukraine".

He apologised to the Ukrainian people for not having "enough strength to keep stability" and for allowing "lawlessness in this country". He vowed to return to Ukraine "as soon as there are guarantees for my security and that of my family". He insisted he had not instructed Ukrainian forces to shoot at Euromaidan protesters.

He did not take part in the 2014 Ukrainian presidential election since he "believe[d] they are unlawful...". He said he was surprised ("knowing the character of Vladimir Vladimirovich Putin") by the silence of Putin, on the events in Ukraine. He hoped to find out more on Russia's position when he meets with Mr. Putin "as soon as he has time".

=== The issue of Russian military intervention ===
On 28 February 2014 Yanukovych claimed "eastern Ukraine will rise up as soon as they have to live without any means". On 28 February 2014 the BBC reported him as insisting that military action was "unacceptable" and as stating that he would not request Russian military intervention.

Russia's Permanent Representative to the United Nations Vitaly Churkin told the UN Security Council on 4 March 2014 that Yanukovych had asked Russia to send troops across the Russia–Ukraine border to protect civilians via a letter to Putin on 1 March 2014. On 4 March 2014 Putin answered questions of reporters about the situation in Crimea. In this interview he claimed "if I do decide to use the Armed Forces, this will be a legitimate decision in full compliance with both general norms of international law, since we have the appeal of the legitimate President."

In an interview with the Associated Press and Russian channel NTV of 2 April 2014 Yanukovych called Russia's annexation of Crimea "a tragedy", the 2014 Crimean referendum "a form of protest" and he stated he hopes it will become part of Ukraine again. Yanukovych said he would try to persuade Putin to return Crimea to Ukraine. He squarely blamed the Yatsenyuk Government and acting Ukrainian president Oleksandr Turchynov for Ukraine's loss of Crimea. He said he gave no orders to open fire on Euromaidan protesters.

Yanukovych said: "We must set such a task and search for ways to return to Crimea on any conditions, so that Crimea may have the maximum degree of independence possible... but be part of Ukraine."

=== March 2014 to December 2021 ===
At a press-conference in Rostov-On-Don on 11 March 2014 Yanukovych asked the Ukrainian military to disobey the "criminal orders" of a "band of ultranationalists and neofascists". He called the 2014 Ukrainian presidential election illegal, as well as U.S. financial help, since US law allegedly did not allow the support of "bandits". Yanukovych stated he would like to ask the Western supporters of the Yatsenyuk Government that he referred to as "dark powers": "Have you become blind? Have you forgotten what fascism is?" alluding to the fact that several positions in the transitional government went to representatives of the right-wing extremist nationalist group Svoboda, condemned by the EU in 2012. Unlike his 28 February press conference, Yanukovych did not take questions from reporters.

On 28 March 2014, Yanukovych asked the Party of Regions to exclude him. He was excluded on 29 March during a party congress along with several senior figures of his régime.

On 13 April, Yanukovych again gave a press conference in Rostov-on-Don, this time accompanied by former Prosecutor General Viktor Pshonka and former interior minister Vitaliy Zakharchenko.

On 13 June 2014, Yanukovych released a video message in which he criticised Poroshenko's handling of the unrest in eastern Ukraine, naming it "criminal orders to kill people...that causes anger and curse the mothers who see the death and suffering of their children". Russian media had previously reported that Yanukovych, along with his wife, had moved to Sochi.

On 21 February 2015, a year after the revolution, Yanukovych gave an interview to Channel One regarding the situation in Ukraine and promised to return to power as soon as he could.

On 18 June 2015, Yanukovych was officially deprived of the title of President of Ukraine.

On 22 June 2015, Yanukovych was interviewed on BBC Newsnight and he accepted some responsibility for the deaths just before his removal from power.

On 7 December 2015, Yanukovych announced his interest in returning to Ukrainian politics.

In a 22 February 2017, interview with Christopher Miller of Radio Free Europe, Konstantin Kilimnik explained the existence of a peace effort between Russia and Ukraine called the "Mariupol Plan" in which Viktor Yanukovych would return as president of Russia's illegally controlled regions and Crimea in Ukraine. Andriy Artemenko's peace plan was known as the "New initiative for Peace".

On 30 December 2021 Yanukovych filed lawsuits against the Verkhovna Rada at the Kyiv District Administrative Court in a bid to overturn his removal of the constitutional powers as President of Ukraine.

=== Russian invasion of Ukraine ===
Russia launched a full-scale invasion of Ukraine on 24 February 2022. On 2 March, Ukrayinska Pravda reported that Ukrainian intelligence sources believed that Yanukovych was spotted in Minsk, Belarus, and that it was Russia's intention to declare Yanukovych as President of Ukraine in the event of Russian forces gaining control of Kyiv. (Note: Analysts in Newsweek claimed that Putin would like to have installed the chairman of the Opposition Platform — For Life, Viktor Medvedchuk, as president instead.)

On 2 March 2022 the Security Service of Ukraine raided the Kyiv District Administrative Court in an attempt to physically block Yanukovych's lawsuits to overturn his removal of the constitutional powers as President of Ukraine to be heard.

According to Ukrainska Pravda's sources Yanukovych left Minsk on 7 March 2022, and again he vanished from the public eye.

Russia's Kyiv offensive ended in failure, with its forces withdrawing from Kyiv Oblast by 2 April 2022. This seems to have ended any chance of Yanukovych being returned to power.

In 2023, Yanukovych was stripped of his Ukrainian citizenship by President Volodymyr Zelenskyy.

In September 2025, Russian media published an interview with Yanukovych in which he insisted on supporting Ukraine's accession to the European Union and called potential Ukrainian membership in NATO a "disaster".

According to an investigation published by the Ukrainian YouTube channel "Toronto TV" in July 2026, Yanukovych currently resides in the Russian resort town of Sochi together with his partner and members of their respective families. Based on data retrieved from healthcare agencies, in Russia Yanukovych uses a passport issued on the name of Oleg Leonov.

== Criminal cases ==
Since the revolution, Yanukovych has been convicted in absentia of high treason against Ukraine. He is wanted by the Prosecutor General of Ukraine, charged with responsibility for mass murder of the Maidan protesters, as well as abuse of power, misappropriation of public funds, bribery, and property theft.

On 28 February 2014, the General Prosecutor of Ukraine, Oleh Makhnitsky, formally asked Russia to extradite Yanukovych. Russian prosecutors stated that they had not received such a request from Ukraine. To date, Russia has declined to extradite him.

=== Sanctions ===
Due to the annexation of Crimea by the Russian Federation he was put on the US sanctions list on 17 March 2014, an action which had been already previously been considered.

He was sanctioned by the British government on 6 March 2014 in relation to the Russo-Ukrainian War.

In 2021 Yanukovych and his son Oleksandr were sanctioned by the EU in relation to his ties to Russia. In August 2023 Yanukovych was sanctioned again following the opening of the Russian invasion of Ukraine. On 20 December 2023, the sanctions placed on Yanukovych were recommended to be lifted by the European General Court stating that they "made an error of assessment" by adding Yanukovych to the list, and that they could not confirm without doubt that his other legal cases in Ukraine were tried without prejudice by Ukrainian courts. Shortly afterwards, the European Commission rejected the suggestion and stated that they will not be lifting the EU-wide sanctions on Yanukovych and his son. An appeal filed by Yanukovych against the sanctions was dismissed by the European General Court on 10 September 2025.

On 16 February 2023, Switzerland launched proceedings to confiscate $140.89 million in assets from Yanukovych's swiss bank accounts stating that they were of "illicit origin" and his assets will be frozen until the trial is completed.

=== Fraud ===
On 11 July 2005, the office of the Donetsk Oblast Prosecutor charged Yanukovych with fraud, stemming from alleged irregularities in the way his convictions were expunged twenty years earlier. In 2006, the General Prosecutor closed the case due to lack of evidence. In 2006, a criminal charge was filed for official falsifying of documents concerning the quashing of Yanukovych's prior convictions after it was discovered that two documents had been tampered with, including the forgery of a judge's signature in connection with one charge of battery.

On 29 January 2010, the Prosecutor General of Ukraine Oleksandr Medvedko claimed that Yanukovych had been unlawfully jailed in his youth.

=== Bribery ===
After the Euromaidan events the General Prosecutor opened at least four new criminal cases against the former president of Ukraine. This included multiple cash payments to a number of Ukraine's top officials which were investigated as suspected bribes. The payments totalled $2 billion over years, ranging from $500,000 to $20 million paid in cash, the recipients included "ministers, heads of agencies, Verkhovna Rada members, civic activists, representatives of international organizations, top judges, including those of the Supreme Administrative Court and the Constitutional Court, and the Central Election Commission".

=== Property theft through conspiracy ===
Yanukovych is also charged with property theft in a conspiracy with the chairman of the Nadra Ukrainy state company (Articles 109 and 209), which has been under investigation since March 2014.

=== Ukrtelekom case ===
On 30 September 2014, the General Prosecutor of Ukraine opened a new case against Yanukovych for using ₴220 million of state money to establish his own private communication company based on Ukrtelekom. The prosecutor's office also considered that Yanukovych was helped by former government officials Mykola Azarov (prime minister), Yuriy Kolobov (finance minister), Anatoliy Markovsky (first deputy minister of finance), Hennadiy Reznikov (director of Derzhspetszviazok), and Dzenyk (Ukrtelekom board of directors).

=== Bond scheme ===
According to a secret Ukrainian court ruling published by Al Jazeera in January 2018, Yanukovych worked with Investment Capital Ukraine (ICU) to illegally purchase $1.5 billion in dollar nominated bonds through the use of Cypriot offshore entities. The government suspected the money to be the proceeds of crimes and seized the funds. ICU denied any wrongdoing.

=== Kharkiv treaty ===
Beginning in the summer of 2014, the prosecutor's office investigated Yanukovych's signing of the Kharkiv treaty, which allowed the Black Sea Fleet to stay in Ukraine for an additional 25 years. Yanukovych is being charged with abuse of power (Article 364) and state treason (Article 111) that are being investigated since April 2014 as well as the new procedure on creation of criminal organization (Article 255) that is being investigated since the summer.

=== Mass murder at Maidan ===
A warrant for Yanukovych's arrest was issued on 24 February 2014 by the interim government, accusing him of responsibility for the mass murder of protesters. Acting Ukrainian Interior Minister Arsen Avakov declared that Yanukovych had been placed on Ukraine's most wanted list and that a criminal case for the mass killings of civilians had been opened against him.

=== Interpol ===
For several years, Interpol refused to place Viktor Yanukovych on the wanted list as a suspect by the new Ukrainian government for the mass killing of protesters during Euromaidan. However, on 12 January 2015, Viktor Yanukovych was listed by Interpol as "wanted by the judicial authorities of Ukraine for prosecution / to serve a sentence" on charges of "misappropriation, embezzlement or conversion of property by malversation, if committed in respect of an especially gross amount, or by an organized group".

On 16 July 2015, Russian media reported that Interpol had suspended its Red Notice for Yanukovych. According to the Ukrainian Interpol office, this was a temporary measure due to Yanukovych's complaints that the charges were politically motivated. Interpol later confirmed that Viktor Yanukovych and Oleksandr Yanukovych were no longer subject to an Interpol red notice or diffusion, and that they are unknown on Interpol's databases. Interpol's action followed an application to Interpol by Joseph Hage Aaronson on behalf of Yanukovych seeking his removal from the Interpol wanted list, as according to the law firm, the criminal charges brought by the Ukrainian government against Yanukovych were "part of a pattern of political persecution of him." In 2017, Yanukovych's son was removed from Interpol's wanted list.

=== Treason ===
In November 2016, Prosecutor General Yuriy Lutsenko questioned Yanukovych via video link in connection with the former Berkut. During the questioning, Lutsenko told Yanukovych that he was being accused of treason.

On 14 March 2017, the Prosecutor General submitted to court documents of the Yanukovych's case on state treason. Yanukovych was charged with encroachment on the territorial integrity and inviolability of Ukraine, high treason, and complicity in aggressive warfare by the Russian Federation aimed at altering Ukraine's state borders.

More than 100 witnesses were interviewed for the case. One was Denis Voronenkov, who was shot dead in downtown Kyiv at the end of March 2017.

On 4 May 2017 the first preliminary session commenced in Kyiv's Obolonskyi District Court under Judge Vladyslav Devyatko. Yanukovych was not present and was tried in absentia. He testified via video link from Russia.

In closing arguments on 16 August, prosecutors Ruslan Kravchenko and Maksym Krym asked the court in Kyiv to sentence Yanukovych to 15 years in prison. The judge then adjourned the trial until 13 September.

Days before he was scheduled to give the final statement, Yanukovych was taken to Moscow's Sklifosovsky Institute of Emergency Medicine by ambulance on 16 November in an immobilized condition. He allegedly sustained back and knee injuries while "playing tennis".

On 24 January 2019 a panel of three judges of the Obolonskyi District Court found Yanukovych guilty of high treason and complicity in the Russian military intervention in Ukraine. They stated that "the court, having heard the testimony of witnesses, examined conclusions of experts, documents and material evidence, assessed the arguments of prosecution and defense, considers that the guilt of the accused in committing the crimes under Part 1 Article 111 (high treason), Part 5 Article 27, Part 2 Article 437 (complicity in conducting an aggressive war) of the Criminal Code of Ukraine is duly proved by relevant and admissible evidence". He was acquitted of the other charge relating to Ukraine's sovereignty and territorial integrity. The verdict was that Yanukovych was sentenced in absentia to 13 years in prison.

On 28 April 2025, Yanukovych was convicted in absentia by a Ukrainian court on charges of inciting the desertion of Ukrainian officials and organizing illegal border crossings to Russia during his escape in 2014. He was sentenced to 15 years' imprisonment.

== Academic degrees ==
The former president's official website stated that he graduated from Donetsk Polytechnic Institute with a major in Mechanical Engineering, holds a master's degree in International Law at the Ukrainian Academy of Foreign Trade and is a member of the Academy of Economic Sciences of Ukraine, PhD in economics.

According to the Russian website ua.spinform.ru, from December 2000 to February 2004, while in the position of Ukrainian prime minister, Yanukovych headed the Faculty of Innovative Management at the Donetsk State University of Management.

Yanukovych's curriculum vitae, published at website europarl.europa.eu, states he is a "Doctor of Economics, Professor, Full Member of the Academy of Economic Sciences of Ukraine, Member of the Presidium of the National Academy of Sciences in Ukraine."

Website Pravda.com.ua reported that Yanukovych received the honorary title of docent (lecturer) of the Faculty of Automobile Transport at the Donetsk State Academy of Administration, a tertiary education establishment that specialised in Economics and Management Oleksandr Zakharov, who studied international law at the Academy of Foreign Trade at the same time as Yanukovych, contended that "individual study programs" such as Yanukovych's were commonly viewed as a diploma mill for state officials.

== Personal life ==
Yanukovych was married to Lyudmyla Oleksandrivna Nastenko. The couple married in 1971. With his wife Yanukovych had two sons, Oleksandr and Viktor, and three grandsons. From 2006 to 2014, the younger Viktor was a member of the Parliament of Ukraine; he died by drowning at Lake Baikal in 2015. In 2024, Oleksandr received Russian citizenship.

Ukrayinska Pravda claims that during the Yanukovych presidency, his wife Lyudmyla lived separately in Donetsk. After the start of the Russo-Ukrainian War she reportedly moved to Crimea.

Until 2004, Yanukovych was known as batia ("Dad") among his family members, but since that time he became "leader".

In March 2012, Yanukovych stated it was "a problem" for him in 2002 to speak Ukrainian but that "once I had the opportunity to speak Ukrainian, I started to do it with pleasure".

== Cultural and political image ==
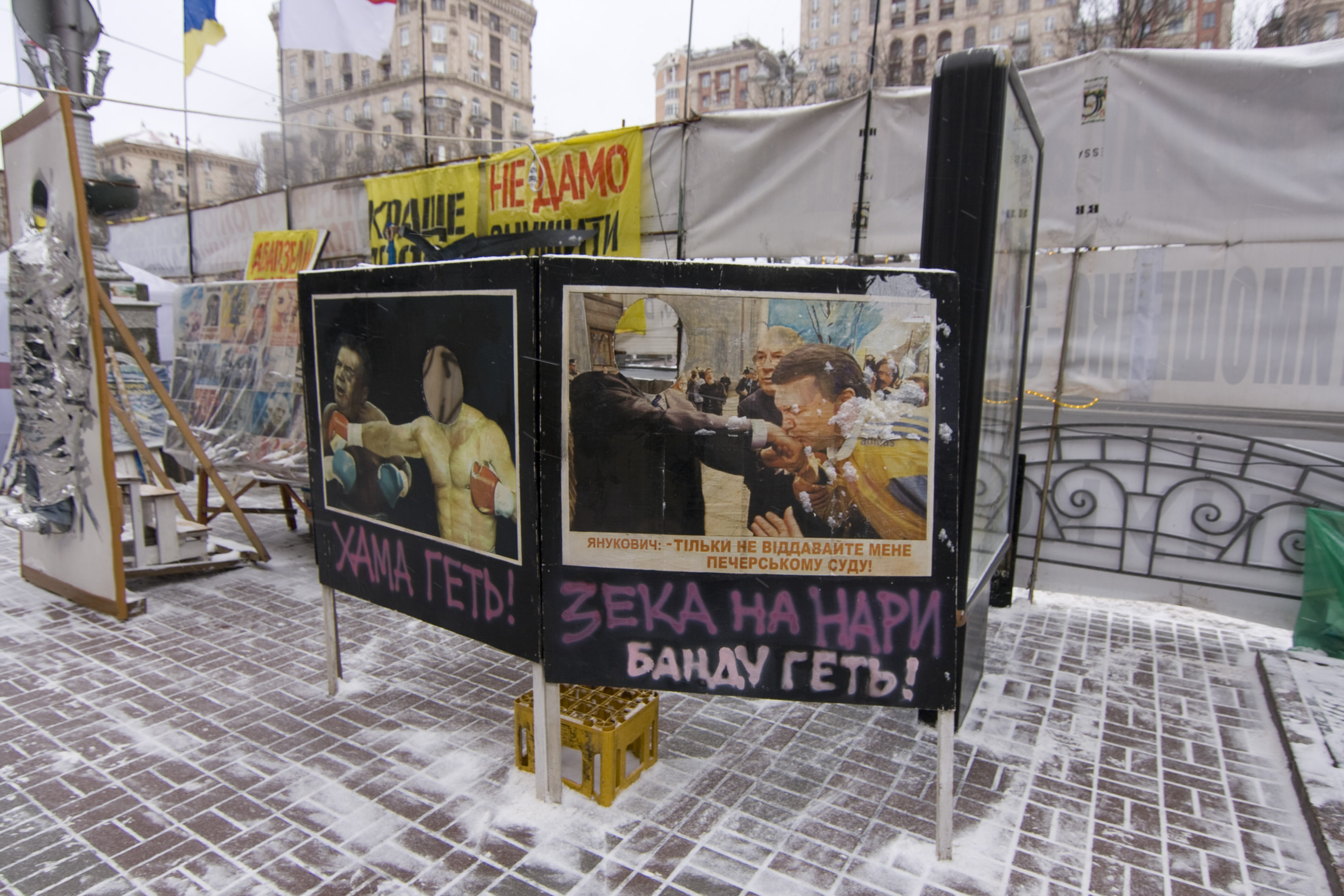
Anti-Yanukovych posters at the Euromaidan, January 2014

Yanukovych was seen by opponents as representing the interests of Ukrainian big business; they pointed out that his campaigns benefited from backing by Ukrainian billionaire Rinat Akhmetov. Supporters of Yanukovych pointed out that Donetsk Oblast secured unprecedented levels of investment during his time in office.

Yanukovych drew strong support from Russian-speaking Ukrainians in the east of the country. He is disliked and distrusted in western Ukraine. The People's Movement of Ukraine labeled his election on 10 February 2010 as "an attack by anti-Ukrainian forces on our state" and stated that "all possible legal means should be used to prevent the concentration of power in the hands of anti-state politician Yanukovych and his pro-Moscow retinue". On 16 February 2010, Yanukovych issued a statement that read: "I can say only one thing to those who anticipate that my presidency will weaken Ukraine – that will never happen." Yanukovych refers to himself as Ukrainian. Voters for Yanukovych in 2010 believed he would bring "stability and order". They blamed the Orange Revolution for creating broken promises, a dysfunctional economy and political chaos. During the 2010 presidential election campaign Yuriy Yakymenko, director of political research at the Razumkov Centre, stated: "I think he has not just changed on the surface but also in his ideas."

In 2004, Yanukovych was seen as Kuchma's and Putin's protégé. Kuchma, however, in conversation with United States Ambassador to Ukraine John F. Tefft, in a document dated 2 February 2010 uncovered during the United States diplomatic cables leak, called the voters' choice between Yanukovych and Yulia Tymoshenko during the second round of the 2010 presidential election a choice between "bad and very bad" and praised Arseniy Yatsenyuk, the candidate eliminated in the first round of the election, instead. In another January 2009 cable then-Ambassador of Ukraine to Russia Kostyantyn Gryshchenko stated that Putin had a low personal regard for Yanukovych. In another Wikileaks diplomatic cable, Volodymyr Horbulin, one of Ukraine's most respected policy strategists and former presidential advisor to then-President Viktor Yushchenko, told the United States Ambassador to Ukraine John E. Herbst in 2006 that Yanukovych's Party of Regions was partly composed of "pure criminals" and "criminal and anti-democracy figures."

Yanukovych is not known as a great speaker. His native language is Russian, similar to a majority of the population of his power-base and native Eastern Ukraine. He, however, made efforts to speak better Ukrainian. He admitted in March 2012 that it was a problem for him in 2002 to speak Ukrainian. He continued making blunders, however, in Ukrainian since then, dubbed "Yanukisms". For the 2004 Ukrainian presidential election, Yanukovych wrote an autobiography for the Central Election Commission, in which he misspelled his academic degree as "proffesor" instead of "professor". The false spelling of the title started to be used as a nickname by opposition media and his political opponents. His autobiographic resume of 90 words contains 12 major spelling and grammatical errors. Opponents of Yanukovych made fun of this misspelling and his criminal convictions during the 2004 Ukrainian presidential election campaign; an incident during his campaign visit to Ivano-Frankivsk in September 2004, when Yanukovych was rushed to hospital after being hit by an egg (while government officials claimed he was hit by a brick), became a source of ridicule and served as an inspiration for a browser game.

Other famous blunders by Yanukovych are his claim that Anton Chekhov was "a Ukrainian poet" in January 2010, forgetting on 6 January 2011 to congratulate the Greek-Catholic Ukrainian community, which, along with the rest of the Ukrainian people, celebrates Christmas that day, and confusing Kosovo with Serbia and Montenegro, and North Ossetia with South Ossetia in March 2010. In a form filled in for the 2004 election he claimed to be fluent in Ukrainian, yet made in that very form a series of egregious mistakes, e.g., spelling his own wife's patronym incorrectly.

Yanukovych stated in November 2009 that he respects all Ukrainian politicians. "I have never offended anyone. This is my rule of politics." In spite of this claim, on 22 September 2007, during the 2007 Ukrainian parliamentary election campaign, while delivering a speech in Vinnytsia, he compared Tymoshenko's performance as prime minister to "a cow on ice", ("Вона прем'єр-міністр, як корова на льду....", "She is a prime minister like a cow on ice") most likely referring to her skills and professionalism as a prime minister.

Other cases of strong colloquialisms used by Yanukovych include the incident when he called former president Yushchenko "a coward and a babbler", as well as a speech in Donetsk during the 2004 Ukrainian presidential election, when he referred to the electorate of his opponent Yushchenko as "goats that make our lives difficult" ("эти козлы, которые нам мешают жить"). Later, during TV debates with Yushchenko he explained, "I called the traitors goats. According to the Bible, the goat is a traitor, and there are also rams, sheep." After his February 2014 escape to Russia, during his 28 February press conference in Rostov-on-Don, Yanukovych said, "Ukraine is our strategic partner" (misspeaking and confusing Ukraine with Russia). During the same press conference he also broke a pen in an emotional outburst, while trying to apologize to the Ukrainian people.

Opinion polls showed that Yanukovych's popularity sank after his election as president in 2010, with polls giving him from 13% to 20% of the votes if a presidential election were to be held in 2012 (in 2010 he received 35.8% of the vote in the first round of that election.) A public opinion poll taken by Sociological group "RATING" gave him 25.1% of the votes in an imaginary February 2013 presidential election. (Note: According to polling organization Sociological group "RATING" in February 2013 Yanukovych would have lost the second round of the presidential election against Vitali Klitschko and/or Arseniy Yatsenyuk and/or Yulia Tymoshenko; and he would have defeated in a close race Oleh Tyahnybok (with 33.5% of the votes).)

The Ambassador of the European Union to Ukraine, José Manuel Pinto Teixeira, stated during an April 2012 interview with Korrespondent that Yanukovych's presidency "fell short of expectations".

In an overview piece in March 2013, The Ukrainian Week claimed that Yanukovych had "failed to meet" his 2010 election promises.

=== Paul Manafort consultancy ===
In December 2004 Yanukovych and his Party of Regions hired American political consultant Paul Manafort as an adviser. He continued to serve in that role through the 2010 Ukrainian presidential election, even as the US government opposed Yanukovych. Manafort's task was to rehabilitate Yanukovych's political career in the aftermath of the Orange Revolution. According the Party of Regions' accounting book (Ukrainian: "амбарну книга"), Manafort, who after the Orange Revolution provided strong support to Yanukovych, received funds from the Party of Regions via the Belize based Neocom Systems Limited's account at the Kyrgyzstan based Asia Universal Bank (AUB) on 14 October 2009.

Manafort hired the public relations firm Edelman to lift Yanukovych's public image. However, Manafort's friends said that Yanukovych "stopped listening" to him after he became president in 2010; Manafort warned him of the consequences of "extreme" political measures.

Manafort later went on to serve as campaign chairman for Donald Trump in 2016. The American FBI began a criminal investigation into Manafort's business dealings while he was lobbying for Yanukovych. American federal prosecutors alleged that between 2010 and 2014 Manafort was paid more than $60 million by Ukrainian sponsors, including Rinat Akhmetov, believed to be the richest man in Ukraine.

In January 2019, Manafort resigned from the Connecticut bar.

== See also ==
- 2006 Ukrainian political crisis
- 2007 Ukrainian political crisis
- 2010 Ukrainian presidential election
- 2014 Hrushevskoho Street riots
- Prelude to the Russian invasion of Ukraine
- Alliance of National Unity

== Notes ==
Political offices
Preceded by Serhii Polyakov	Governor of Donetsk Oblast; 1997–2002	Succeeded by Anatoliy Blyznyuk
Preceded by Anatoliy Kinakh	Prime Minister of Ukraine; 2002–2004	Succeeded by Mykola Azarov; Acting
Preceded by Mykola Azarov; Acting	Prime Minister of Ukraine; 2004–2005	Succeeded by Mykola Azarov; Acting
Preceded by Yuriy Yekhanurov	Prime Minister of Ukraine; 2006–2007	Succeeded by Yulia Tymoshenko
Preceded by Viktor Yushchenko	President of Ukraine; 2010–2014	Succeeded by Petro Poroshenko
Party political offices
Preceded by Volodymyr Semynozhenko	Leader of the Party of Regions; 2003–2010	Succeeded by Mykola Azarov
Sporting positions
Preceded by Ivan Fedorenko	President of the National Olympic Committee; 2002–2005	Succeeded by Sergey Bubka
