= Tantalit =

- Type: Limited liability company
- Industry: construction
- Founded: Kyiv, Ukraine
- Key people: Pavlo Lytovchenko; Johann Wanovits (before 2013); Andriy Klyuyev (before 2014)
- Products: residential and non-residential buildings
- Revenue: not disclosed
- Operating income: not disclosed
- Parent: Serhiy Klyuyev

Tantalit (TOB; Ukrainian: Танталіт, Russian: Танталит) is an originally Ukrainian association with limited liability. According to the State Committee of Statistics of Ukraine, the association was founded by the Austrian company Euro East Beteiligungs GmbH from Vienna and a native of Donetsk named Pavlo Lytovchenko (born in 1980, aged 41–42).

The company legally owns 129 ha (320 acres) of the former state property Mezhyhirya, the former residence of former President Viktor Yanukovych. This is because in the 2000s, former President Viktor Yushchenko agreed the transfer of 139.7 hectares of land at Mezhyhirya for a 49-year lease to the Tantalit company. Before the Revolution of Dignity, a share in the company was owned by the pro-Russian Ukrainian politician Andriy Klyuyev, who was close to former President Viktor Yanukovych. Before fleeing Ukraine, Klyuyev sold his share in Tantalit.

The company has been implicated as one of the holdings used by Yanukovych to embezzle funds, as well as act as a cover for full ownership of the Mezhyhirya property, of which its privatisation in 2007 was alleged as illegal by opposition activists.

According to rumours, one of the current owners is a resident of the United Arab Emirates. In 2018, a lawyer from the company arrived at Mezhyhirya to allege that the protestors occupying the complex were "thugs" and that on 22 February 2014 protestors broke into Mezhyhirya in what was a criminal action and that they were now illegally occupying it. Though legal paperwork was prepared, a lawsuit was never filed, reportedly because of Ukrainian popular support for those occupying the complex.

== Company ownership ==
The share capital of the company in 2010 consisted of ₴146,629,000 (over $18,320,000). About 0.03% or ₴44,000 was a capital of Lytovchenko, while 99.97% or ₴146,585,000 – part of the Euro East Beteiligungs (see de:Beteiligung (Strafrecht)). On September 3, 2013 Serhiy Klyuyev bought Tantalit for $18.25 mln.

=== Pavlo Lytovchenko ===
Pavlo Lytovchenko, beside founding Talantit, also established another company Edelweiss, LLC (Ukrainian: ТОВ "Едельвейс"), shareholders of which are a son of Viktor Yanukovych, Oleksandr and a Donetsk lawyer Andriy Fedoruk.

Pavlo Lytovchenko is also a shareholder of another company Aqualine Plus, LLC (Ukrainian: ТОВ "Аквалайн Плюс") sharing its ownership with company Capital Building Corporation.

Pavlo Lytovchenko is also a trustee for Viktor Viktorovych Yanukovych, a son of the President of Ukraine Viktor Yanukovych, according to the 2010 declaration of income of Viktor Viktorovych Yanukovych.

=== Euro East Beteiligungs ===
Director of the company is Johann Wanovits who works as a stockbroker in the Euro Invest Bank AG who owns 65% of the Euro East Beteiligungs. The other 35% of Beteiligings belong to another company "BLYTHE (Europa) Ltd" (London), director of which is Reinhard Proksch who also is a director of yet another company Astute Partners Ltd.

In April 2013 Johann Wanovits was jailed for the next five years when he was found guilty of manipulating Telekom Austria's share price. The scandal touched some other people as well.

Euro Invest Bank AG was founded by Wanovits back in 1989.

Another founder of Euro East Beteiligungs is a company BLYTHE Associates, Inc in Road Town, British Virgin Islands. Along with Pavlo Kovalyov, BLYTHE Associates established the Centeravia, LLC (Ukrainian: ТОВ "Центравіа") and owns 99.9% of its shares.

== See also ==
- Ukraine Air Enterprise
- Activ Solar
