= Activ Solar =

Activ Solar GmbH
- Type: Gesellschaft mit beschränkter Haftung
- Industry: Photovoltaics
- Founded: 2008
- Headquarters: Vienna, Austria
- Area served: Ukraine
- Key people: Kaveh Ertefai (CEO); Johann Harter (COO); Mykhailo Cherevko (Director, Ukraine subsidiary)
- Products: Polysilicon
- Services: Large-scale solar PV project development
- Number of employees: 1,400+ (2011; together with subsidiaries)
- Subsidiaries: Diamond Activ Solar GmbH; PJSC Semiconductor Plant; Activ Solar LLC (Ukraine)

Activ Solar GmbH, headquartered in Vienna, Austria, was a developer of solar energy. It was engaged in the production of polycrystalline silicon (polysilicon) for the solar PV industry and the development of large-scale photovoltaic power stations in Ukraine. In February 2016, it filed for insolvency.

== Operations ==
=== Polysilicon production ===
Activ Solar produced high-purity polysilicon at its subsidiary PJSC Semiconductor Plant, located in Zaporizhzhia, Ukraine. The production of semiconductor materials at the original Zaporizhzhia Titan and Magnesium Plant dates back to 1935. The facility formed the foundation of PJSC Semiconductor Plant, which began production of semiconductor-grade polysilicon in 1964. It was separated from the Zaporizhzhia Titan and Magnesium Plant in 2002.

The plant was historically also the only manufacturer of high-purity trichlorosilane in the Soviet Union. After comprehensive refurbishment and modernization, PJSC Semiconductor Plant reached an annual capacity of 2,500 metric tons of polysilicon and 27,000 metric tons of trichlorosilane (HCl_{3}Si). In 2011, the facility reached capacity of ~20 metric tons per annum of monocrystalline silicon using legacy equipment with a plan to expand to ~400 metric tons per annum. The factory also produced silicon tetrachloride (SiCl_{4}), hydrogen, nitrogen and hydrochloric acid.

=== Solar PV projects development ===
Activ Solar developed large-scale solar photovoltaic installations. As of November 2012, it had developed six solar PV power stations with 313.35 megawatts (MW) of installed capacity on the Crimean Peninsula and Odesa region.

The company constructed Ukraine's first large-scale photovoltaic power plant—the 7.5 MW Rodnikovoye Solar Park—in February 2011. It was built about 3 kilometres (1.9 mi) from Simferopol in Crimea. The total number of solar modules installed reached about 33,800 on a total surface area of approximately 15 hectares (37 acres).

In October 2011, Activ Solar commissioned the 80 MW Okhotnykovo Solar Park. Installation consisting of approximately 360,000 ground-mounted PV-modules and spanning over 160 hectares (400 acres) able to generate 100 GWh of electricity per year.

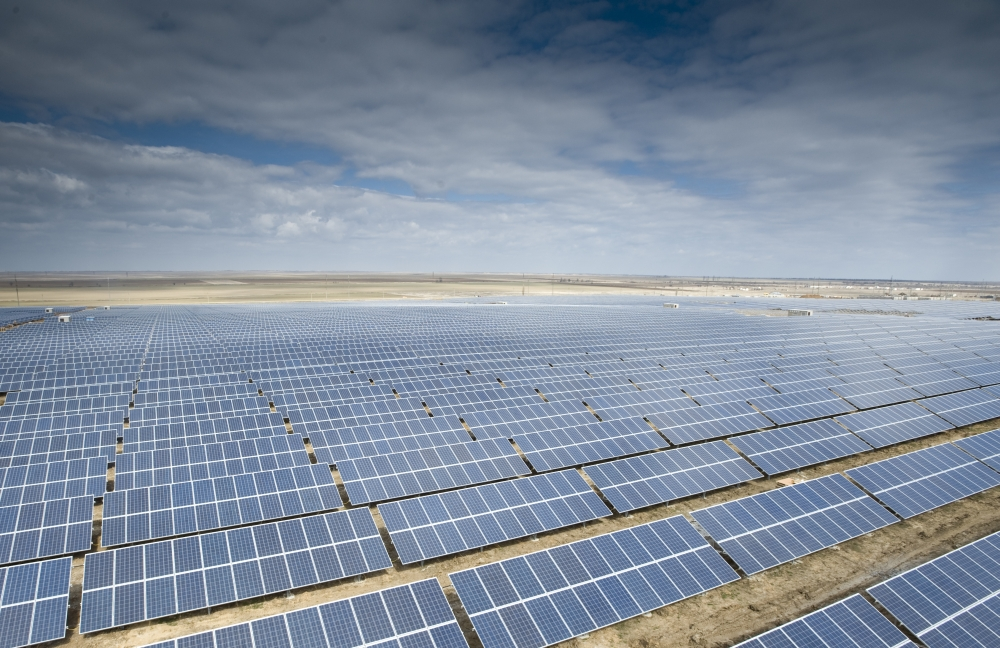
Mityaevo Solar Park (31.55 MW)

In December 2011, Activ Solar completed the 105.56 MW Perovo Solar Park, amongst the largest in the world. Perovo's more than 440,000 crystalline solar PV modules can produce as much as 132.5 GWh) of electricity per year.

In April 2012, Activ Solar finished work on the 31.55 MW station located in the village of Mityaevo in Crimea. The ground-mounted power station houses over 134,000 polycrystalline modules, installed in double rows and connected by over 440 kilometres (270 mi) of cable, and able to generate approximately 40 GWh of electricity per annum.

In July 2012, Activ Solar completed the 42.95 MW Starkozache power plant in Odesa Oblast. It is installed over a surface of 80 hectares (200 acres) and consists of 185,952 multi-crystalline solar modules and 41 inverters. The solar plant is able to generate 54.106 GWh of electricity per annum.

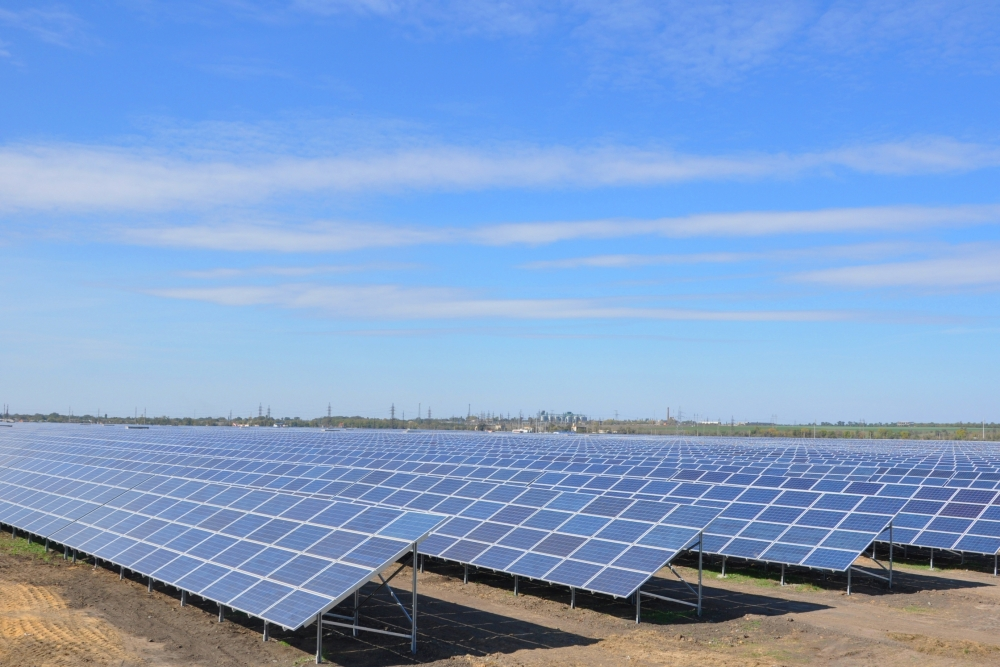
Dunayskaya Solar Park (43.14 MW)

In November 2012, Activ Solar completed the second phase of the 43.14 MW Dunayskaya Solar Power Station. Located in the southern part of Odesa Oblast, it comprises 182,380 multicrystalline photovoltaic modules, 40 inverter stations and around 645 kilometres (401 mi) of cable.

In February 2013, Activ Solar announced the start of commissioning of the 29.3 MW Voznesensk Solar Power Station in Mykolaiv region. Voznesensk Solar Power Station consists of 121,176 multicrystalline solar modules and 27 inverter stations installed on a four-row mounting system. The power station's electricity production capacity totals 35,000 megawatt hours per annum.

In April 2013, Activ Solar announced the commissioning of the 43.4 MW Lymanske Solar Power Plant in the southwestern part of Odesa Oblast. It comprises 181.192 multicrystalline, installed in one row and connected by over 41 inverter stations. The solar plant will generate 59.415 GWh of electricity per annum.

=== Research and development ===
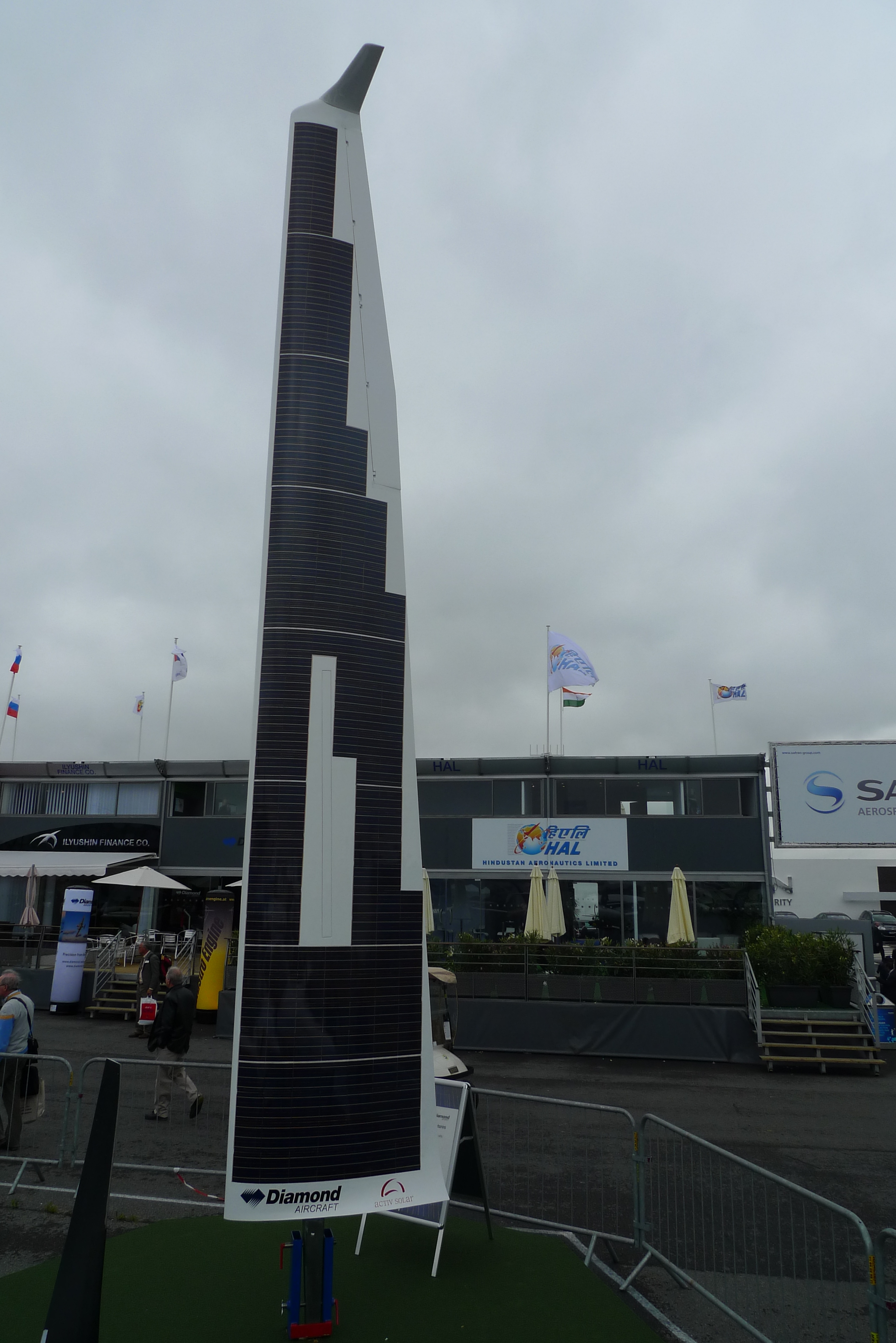
Activ Solar and Diamond Aircraft Industries exhibited a prototype aircraft wing with embedded solar panels at the Paris Air Show 2011 Le Bourget

Activ Solar owned a research and development joint-venture with Diamond Aircraft Industries. Diamond Activ Solar exhibited a solar aircraft wing at the Paris Air Show 2011.

== Ownership ==
Activ Solar was controlled by Ukraine's former first deputy prime minister Andriy Klyuyev and his brother Serhiy Klyuyev. CEO of Activ Solar, Kaveh Ertefai, was Serhiy Klyuyev's son-in-law. Bohdan Klyuyev, son of Andriy Klyuyev, was a business developer manager of Activ Solar LLC (Ukraine). According to Kyiv Post, Klyuyev's companies were registered at the same building where Activ Solar had its representative office in Ukraine.

According to the report by Ukrayinska Pravda, Activ Solar was founded by Slav Beteiligung GmbH, owned by Slav AG, investment firm of by brothers Kluyevs. In late 2008, the ownership was transferred to Kaveh Ertefay. In July 2009, ownership was transferred to P&A Corporate Trust. According to a British register, P&A Corporate Trust owns British firm Blythe (Europe) Ltd, which owns 35% of company Tantalit.

According to the company register, in 2011 Activ Solar was 100% owned by Liechtenstein-registered P&A Corporate Trust. According to the company, shareholders of the company were European institutional and private investors. According to Johann Harter (COO), all shareholders were Austrian institutional and private investors and there were no Ukrainian private investors or companies associated with Ukraine among the shareholders. According to Kave Ertefay, 50% of the shares belonged to investors from Austria and the rest of the EU. Interfax-Ukraina agency reported that controlling stake in Activ Solar belonged to Christian Dries, the owner of Diamond Aircraft Industries, and the rest was owned by the management of the company. At the beginning of 2016, the sole owner of the company was Viennese lawyer Stefan Benesch.

== Insolvency ==
On 1 April 2014, Activ Solar stopped operations of its solar power plants in Crimea due to unclear legal situation after annexation of Crimea by the Russian Federation. While Ukrainian authorities stopped paying feed-in tariff for Crimean solar plants, Crimean and Russian authorities also refused to pay it. In spring 2015, the Crimean solar plants were seized by Russian banks to cover the outstanding loans of Activ Solar. In November 2015, the China National Building Material Company (CNBM) received a clearance to buy Activ Solar's subsidiary operating ten solar parks located in Mykolaiv and Odesa oblasts. According to the company, it had controlled these power stations since mid-2014 as collateral of its €160 million loan to Activ Solar. CNBM is also interested in buying the Zaporizhzhia Semiconductor Plant.

An investigation had been launched concerning the Ukrainian state credit grant to the Zaporizhzhia Semiconductor Plant in 2010. In October 2015, the Ukrainian court ordered repayment of the €57 million grant. As a result, Activ Solar filed for reorganisation in the Commercial Court of Vienna on 10 February 2016. The company explained this move with challenging market conditions in Ukraine due to the economic and political crisis in the region, which affected production in the Zaporizhzhia Semiconductor Plant. For that time, Activ Solar's debt had amounted €503.4 million while its assets accounted €18.69 million. The company proposed a two-years restructuring plan with 20% of its debts repayment. Attorney Ute Toifl was appointed as an insolvency administrator. Also the Zaporizhzhia Semiconductor Plant went into bankruptcy.
