= Yulia Marushevska =

Ukrainian activist and civil servant

- Юлія Марушевська
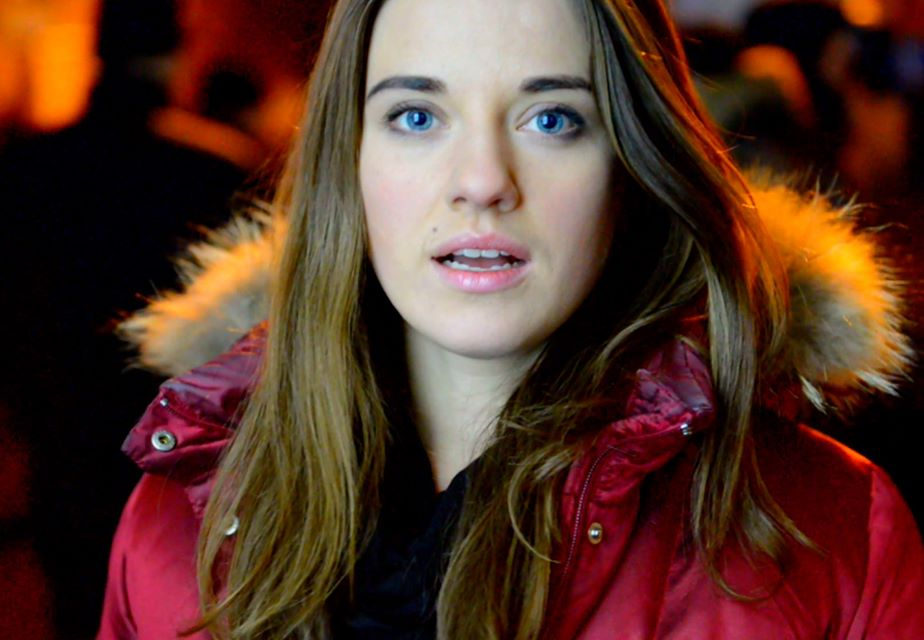
- Marushevska in 2014
- Born: 2 October 1989 (age 36); Shcherbani, Ukrainian SSR, Soviet Union
- Education: Taras Shevchenko National University of Kyiv; Stanford University
- Occupations: Activist, speaker, student, public servant
- Years active: 2007–present

Chief of Odesa Customs
- In office 19 October 2015 – 14 November 2016
- President: Petro Poroshenko
- Governor: Mikheil Saakashvili

Yulia Marushevska (Ukrainian: Юлія Марушевська, born 2 October 1989) is a Ukrainian activist and civil servant. A graduate student in literature and history, she appeared in a short video, entitled I Am a Ukrainian, which went viral after being posted in February 2014. In the spring of 2014, she gave talks about the cause of Ukrainian freedom in the United States and Canada and was interviewed by news media from dozens of countries.

In June 2015, a 24-year-old Marushevska joined the Odesa Oblast government team led by Mikheil Saakashvili, a former President of Georgia who was appointed a Governor of the Oblast. Marushevska was then appointed chief of Odesa Customs in October 2015 and resigned from that post in November 2016 because she felt the then Groysman government made custom reforms no longer possible.

== Early life and education ==
Yulia Marushevska was born on 2 October 1989 in the village of Shcherbani in Voznesensk Raion, Mykolaiv Oblast, southern Ukraine. She was raised in the village of Sadove in Tatarbunary Raion, Odesa Oblast. "I grew up as an ordinary, Western child," she told the Stanford Daily in an April 2014 interview. She is a Ph.D. candidate in literature and history at Taras Shevchenko University in Kyiv.

She stated in a post-video interview, "I study Ukrainian literature but I cannot think about my Ph.D. paper. It's very important now to change the system because my degree would be useless in a corrupt society. If you want to understand something about Ukrainian protest spirit, try to find Taras Shevchenko in English."

Marushevska was not politically active prior to the protests, "but when the government stopped an agreement with the EU I was very frustrated." She decided to take part in the Euromaidan protests, taking to the streets "from the very beginning of the protests." She worked as a volunteer on a phone hotline and worked as a guard in a hospital from which injured protesters had been kidnapped by police and put in prison. Her mother, also a fervent supporter of the EuroMaidan Revolution, "volunteered day and night to help feed demonstrators and slept on the barricades." Marushevska was a student teacher and took her students to the Maidan during the protests "to study Ukraine there, not in the classroom."

== Career ==
=== I Am a Ukrainian ===
==== Making the video ====
The video was shot by British cinematographer Graham Mitchell and posted by American filmmaker Ben Moses, producer of the film Good Morning Vietnam. Marushevska met Moses when she was working for him as a translator for his documentary on Andriy Shevchenko. At the time she made the video, she was 24 years old.

It was Marushevska's idea to film a stand-up video on Hrushevskoho Street, where two men had been killed in the protests. "I wanted to tell the world what was really going on in Ukraine," she later explained. "One day I woke up and I read in the news about two men who were killed during the protests. It affected me very much because I never seen a situation where innocent people were being killed just because they showed that they don’t want such a government." The Kyiv Post stated that she was motivated partly by guilt "because she felt that she wasn't doing enough to help the EuroMaidan Revolution and partly out of frustration with foreigners' ignorance about why demonstrators were camping out on Kyiv's freezing streets to change their government." She told the Kyiv Post, "People know nothing about Ukraine. Ukraine is terra incognita for the world."

She and Mitchell made their way to the Maidan, where the two men had been killed, and made the video. "It was very cold, minus 20, and I was freezing to death," she later recalled. "I did two tries, two takes, but I was frozen to death and could not talk anymore. My accent is horrible. I could not find the right words and right intonation. I tried. I thought I would try later, maybe I will do it better. But then all these events happened and the situation got worse. It was apathy and depression, and I had no energy to do it again."

In the video, Marushevska is standing at the Maidan at midnight two days after the first killings. She states: "I want you to know why thousands of people all over my country are on the streets. There is only one reason: We want to be free from a dictatorship. We want to be free from the politicians who work only for themselves, who are ready to shoot, to beat, to injure people just for saving their money, just for saving their houses, just for saving their power. I want these people who are here to have dignity, who are brave, I want them to live a normal life. We are civilized people, but our government are barbarians … We want to be free. I know that maybe tomorrow we will have no phone, no Internet connection and we will be alone here. And maybe police will murder us one after another, when it will be dark here."

She later said: "It was very important for me to show the protesters on the street are not terrorists, extremists, bandits or Nazis as it was shown in some media. We are normal people from the whole of Ukraine…who speak different languages, and are fighting for our right to have a normal standard of living and a real democracy, not the illusion of democracy that we had before."

She sent the video to Moses, who edited it and sent it back. She then showed it to friends, who assured her that "it's powerful and it can work."

==== Marushevska's post-video comments ====
In an interview with The Daily Beast, published on February 21, 2014, after the death of about 100 people in protests in Kyiv, Marushevska stated: "When you see this violence on the street, you understand these people [the authorities], they are like not humans, they are from another reality. I don't know how to influence them. I understand the only language they know is the language of power, the language of money." She also said that the conflict in Ukraine is about "the opportunity…to have a chance to develop. If we lose, we will lose not only economic possibilities. We will lose hope."

She told Voice of America that "we are not just fighting for another president, we are fighting for a normal human life, on a normal social level, with normal values." "People are not planning to leave Independence Square because they feel responsible now," she said in March 2014. "I am optimistic about the future. I believe we will build a normal, prosperous, democratic society but I am realistic about how much work we have ahead. Maybe we will have to become even stronger because this is only the first step. There are hundreds of steps ahead."

She has expressed remorse that in a country as rich as Ukraine "so many live a poor life", with 30-40% of Ukrainians living below the poverty line. "If there isn’t enough money to cure children from cancer but always enough money to buy new furniture from the best Italian designers, it's really sad. The problem is this disrespect – people lived on this small amount of money without having a dignified life."

Marushevska told the Kyiv Post that while making the video, she wondered whether she was exaggerating when she called Yanukovych a dictator. "I was doubting it," she admitted. But after she was taken on a tour of Yanukovych's palace, "I understood that he was a real dictator who did whatever he wanted…golden forks and so forth. A normal person doesn't do that when there are children dying from cancer and he's buying this stupid, useful [sic], ugly stuff for nothing. It's useless."

Marushevska stated that she admires the U.S. due to the rule of freedom, but is sceptical of European democracy, which is rife with red tape. Her hope for Ukraine is that it will develop "an American democracy without a European bureaucracy."

"I respect Russian people," she told Charlie Rose in an April 10 interview, "but I will never respect the humiliation of my country."

She has said that she did not take any personal pleasure from her fame because "it is based on the tragedy of my country and dozens of people… I'm associated with tragedy... But I know how much more people gave to Maidan, like my mom spending days and nights on the barricades, like a lot of people who risked their lives."

In another interview she said, "I dream to create something else, not this. We'll create great things, positive things about normal life, about beauty, about art, about love, about the best parts of my country." The video, she noted, "was translated into Ukrainian and showed on our news channel. I am not a celebrity, I would rather have no attention. I am not a symbol of happiness, I am a symbol of a bad time in Ukraine and there is nothing joyful about that."

She has expressed the hope that other countries will have more open visa policies with Ukraine and establish more student exchange programs, and that Ukraine will attract more international business and commerce.

==== Russian reaction ====
The Russian TV network RT alleged that Marushevska's video was a product of the U.S. Department of State; Ben Moses said that the Russians were "terrified" by the video's impact and had begun to attack her character.

=== Foreign appearances ===
On March 26, 2014, Marushevska spoke in front of the Brandenburg Gate in Berlin. She expressed gratitude for the support of the international community for the struggle of the Ukrainian people and underscored that her people’s fight is not with the Russian people but with Putin's government. She said, "I hope that one day the Russian people will win its fight against corruption and for freedom." On the same day she took part in a panel discussion at the Institute for Cultural Diplomacy, where she talked about the Ukrainian news media's reaction to her video, which some considered propaganda.

Marushevska spoke at the ICC Auditorium at Georgetown University on April 2, 2014. Moses appeared with her, and talked about the role of social media in the Ukrainian protests. Georgetown's student newspaper, the Hoya reported that "Attendees came away impressed by Marushevska's poise in delivering her message, and her ability to convey the emotions felt by everyday Ukrainians." On April 8, she spoke at Stanford University. She was interviewed on Charlie Rose on April 10. On April 13, she spoke at Christ the King Ukrainian Catholic Church in Jamaica Plain, Massachusetts. On April 16, she participated in a panel discussion, Rights, Repression, and Revolution: A Tale of Two Countries – Ukraine and Venezuela, at Harvard University.

In Canada, she appeared on Sun News and spoke at a rally outside Toronto City Hall. She expressed the Ukrainian people's gratitude for international support and about the importance of this support in helping boost Ukrainian people's morale and overcome their fear. She expressed her respect for the Russian people and her hope that they, too, would win their fight for freedom, and said that the Ukrainians would be on their side.

She spoke at the Oslo Freedom Forum on October 21, 2014.

=== State services career ===
On June 9, 2015, Mikheil Saakashvili, the Head of the Odesa Oblast State Administration (Governor), announced the inclusion of Marushevska in his transitional team. According to Mikheil Saakashvili, Marushevska had previously spent a year of training at Harvard and Stanford universities. On June 23, he announced his appointment of Marushevska as head of a newly created Investment agency of the Odesa regional government.

On 16 October 2015, President Petro Poroshenko announced that Marushevska would serve as the head of Odesa customs. Commenting in May 2016, Saakashvili said, "Nobody took her seriously when she was appointed. ... But she has this grit to really change things."

Marushevska clashed with the head of the State Fiscal Service, Roman Nasirov, who has been implicated in corruption. Marushevska resigned as custom head on 14 November 2016, saying "The government doesn't have the political will to conduct the reform of the Customs service. Kyiv doesn't have a vision of the reforms". Other sources stated that she resigned after her anti-corruption reform efforts were sabotaged not only by Prime Minister Volodymyr Groysman alone, but by President Petro Poroshenko as well. In December, Nasirov said that he was investigating Marushevska for corruption. She stated that his accusations were politically-motivated and that officials interested in preserving the status quo had blocked her work, including attempts to dismiss corrupt officials.
