= Nickel & Dime =

- Directed by: Ben Moses
- Written by: Ben Moses; Eddy Pollon; Seth Front
- Produced by: Lynn Danielson
- Starring: C. Thomas Howell; Wallace Shawn
- Release date: 1991
- Running time: 91 minutes 96 minutes
- Country: United States
- Language: English

Nickel & Dime is a 1991 American comedy film written by Ben Moses, Eddy Pollon and Seth Front, directed by Moses and starring C. Thomas Howell and Wallace Shawn.

== Cast ==
- C. Thomas Howell as Jack Stone
- Wallace Shawn as Everett Willits
- Lise Cutter as Cathleen Markson
- Roy Brocksmith as Sammy Thornton
- Lynn Danielson as Destiny Charm
- Kathleen Freeman as Judge Letcher

== Reception ==
Scott Hamilton and Chris Holland of Radio Times awarded the film two stars out of five and wrote, "Never very funny, and the middle portion of the film drags terribly..."

TV Guide gave the film a negative review, describing the screenplay as "frenetic but weak-kneed and almost totally implausible."

Kevin Thomas of the Los Angeles Times gave the film a mixed review and wrote, "The film may wind up a loser, but Howell and Shawn are certainly winning."
