= Honkarakenne =

Finnish log home manufacturing company

Honkarakenne Oyj
- Company type: Julkinen osakeyhtiö
- Traded as: Nasdaq Helsinki: HONBS
- Industry: Construction products industry
- Founded: 1958; 68 years ago in Finland
- Founder: The Saarelainen brothers
- Headquarters: Karstula, Finland
- Area served: Worldwide
- Key people: Marko Saarelainen (CEO)
- Products: Log houses; prefabricated homes
- Brands: Honka
- Revenue: €36.7 million (2019)
- Operating income: €3.4 million (2024)
- Net income: €−2.4 million (2024)
- Total assets: €26.6 million (2024)
- Total equity: €13.7 million (2024)
- Number of employees: 157 (average, 2024)
- Website: honka.com/en/

Honkarakenne Oyj (Nasdaq Helsinki: HONBS; formerly Honkarakenne Oy until 1998) is a Finnish company that manufactures log homes. Honka is the company's registered trademark. The company was founded in 1958 and has been listed on Nasdaq Helsinki since 1987.

Honkarakenne’s manufacturing operations are centralized at its production facility in Karstula, Central Finland. In 2024, the company employed an average of 157 people.

== History ==
Honkarakenne was founded in 1958 by the Saarelainen brothers in eastern Finland. The company developed from a small sawmilling and planing business and was among the early Finnish firms to industrialize traditional log construction, which had previously relied mainly on handcrafted methods. By introducing factory-based production and prefabricated log components, Honkarakenne contributed to making log houses more standardized and suitable for larger-scale production.

During the 1960s and early 1970s, the company expanded its operations and gradually moved away from small-scale sawmilling toward industrial log house manufacturing. A key milestone was the establishment of Karstula, in Central Finland, as the company’s main production site in the early 1970s. The location offered access to raw materials and transport links, and over time Karstula became the center of Honkarakenne’s manufacturing activities.

From the 1970s onward, Honkarakenne increased its domestic presence and began to expand internationally through export projects. By the 1980s, international sales had become an important part of the business, particularly in Central Europe and Japan. In 1987, Honkarakenne was listed on the Helsinki Stock Exchange.

== Markets ==
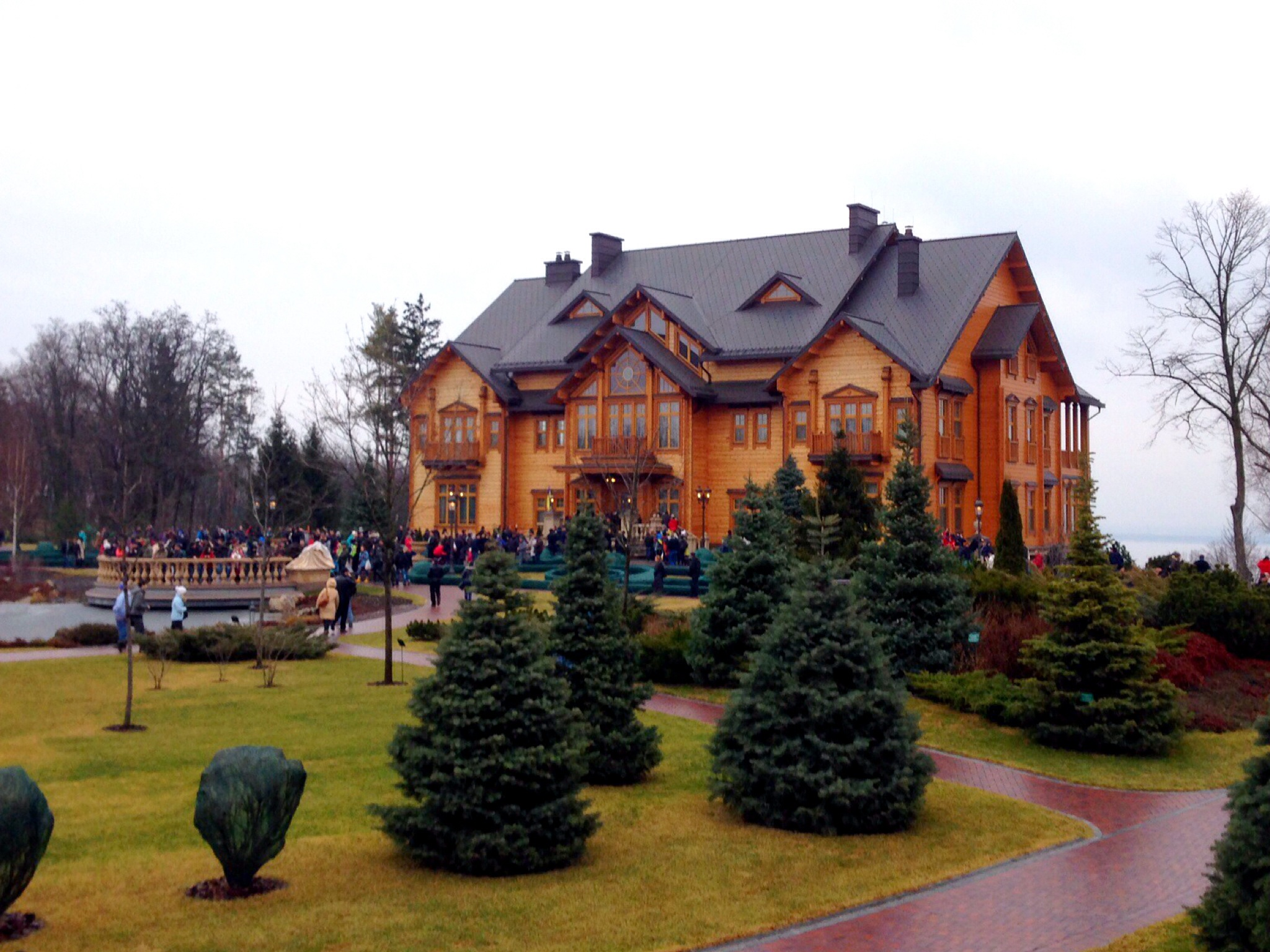
The "Honka" clubhouse at the Mezhyhirya Residence, Ukraine

Honkarakenne's main market area is Finland. Honkarakenne has representatives in almost every country in Central, Southern and Eastern Europe. By far its largest log buildings are ordered from Russia. Most builders are newly prosperous or wealthy companies, but recent customers also include well-to-do middle-class clients. Honka also has a number of extensive projects underway in Ukraine and Kazakhstan, including the main building at Mezhyhirya Residence, the home of former prime minister Viktor Yanukovych. It also has significant net sales in the former CIS countries. Exports to the Far East are focused on Japan and South Korea, and the company has representatives in countries such as China and Mongolia. Individual projects have been implemented in countries as far away as Kenya.
