= Ben Moses =

American screenwriter

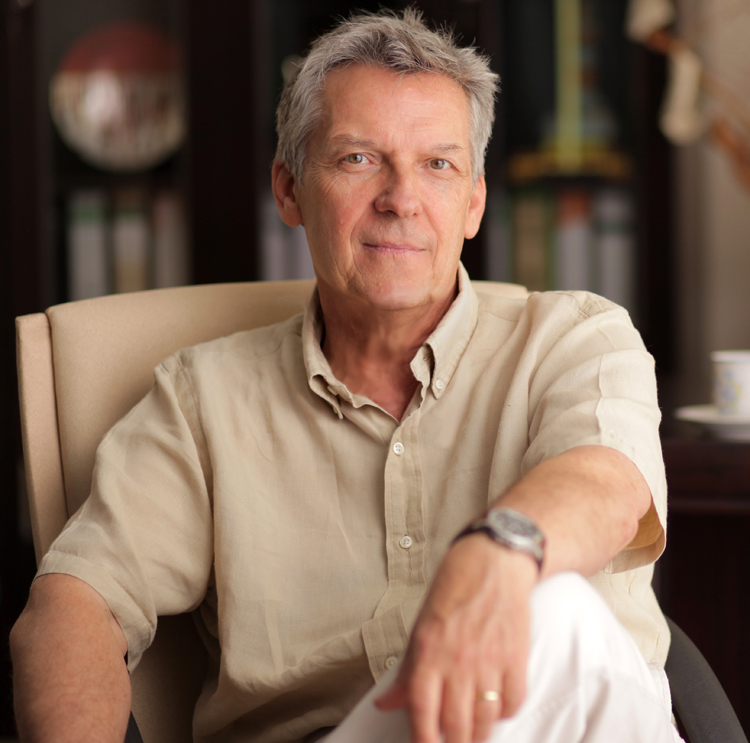
- Born: 1948 (age 77–78); Illinois
- Occupations: Writer, director, producer

Ben Moses (born 1948) is an American documentarian, television producer, director, writer, and filmmaker best known for Good Morning, Vietnam and the documentary A Whisper to a Roar. Moses has been the executive in charge of television production and programming for General Electric, the executive producer of the ABC-TV affiliate in Washington, D.C., and was a producer for Young & Rubicam Advertising in New York.

== Early career ==
Moses was born and raised in southern Illinois, and it was his interest in amateur radio that introduced him to the world beyond his small hometown. He received his first "ham" radio license at the age of ten and started talking to other ham operators all over the world via short-wave radio. He received his First Class Television Engineering License at the age of 16. During college at the McKelvey School of Engineering at Washington University in St. Louis, where he studied electrical engineering, he worked at the local public television station, KETC, as a cameraman and engineer, and joined the International Brotherhood of Electrical Workers (IBEW). His sophomore year he attended Jacksonville University in Florida, studying theater, and worked as a cameraman at Jacksonville's Channel 10 and was the all-night DJ at WZOK Radio.

== Military service and "Good Morning, Vietnam" ==
The following year, he was recruited to join the U.S. Army Intelligence Corps and trained at Fort Holabird, Maryland. Then he was assigned to the 519th MI Battalion in Miami, Florida, where he interviewed Cuban refugees fleeing Fidel Castro’s government. During the last six months of his enlistment, his unit was deployed to Vietnam, where he joined Armed Forces Radio-Saigon and met the station’s program director, Airman Adrian Cronauer. Their close friendship resulted in Moses' decision to write the story of their experiences at Armed Forces Radio – Saigon, which he titled "Good Morning, Vietnam"

== Television career ==
After the Army, Moses' first network television job was in 1970 as a camera assistant for CBS on The Jackie Gleason Show in Miami Beach. He married Andrea Duda, one of the show's dancers, and they moved to New York, where in 1971 he became a producer for Young & Rubicam Advertising. Eighteen months later he joined General Electric as executive in charge of television programming and production for the company’s new General Electric Theatre series of TV documentaries and movies, one of which -– “The Wolfmen”—received an Academy Award. While in New York, Moses earned his private pilot's license and began to write articles for Flying Magazine.

Four years and dozens of awards for the series later, he divorced, resigned from GE, and returned to working directly in live production. He freelanced as a stage manager, director and associate director for CBS on 60 Minutes, soap operas, election coverage and CBS Sports and News specials with Walter Cronkite and Dan Rather in the mid-1970s. Then he was hired as executive producer at the ABC affiliate in Washington, DC, where he oversaw news specials that received national acclaim and two Emmy nominations.

In 1977, Moses moved to Los Angeles to work on Barry Manilow's first television special as Associate Director, then stayed with the production team for more music-variety specials. Under director Marty Pasetta and the production team that produced the Academy Awards, Emmy Awards and Grammy Awards specials, Moses worked as stage manager and/or AD on those and many other live musical-variety specials for CBS, ABC and NBC. In between specials, from 1977-1981, Moses was the associate director of the ABC hit game show Family Feud starring Richard Dawson.

== Feature film career ==
In 1983, Robin Williams became attached to Moses' treatment for Good Morning, Vietnam, and for the next five years the project was in development at Paramount Pictures. During this time Moses began teaching documentary production at the University of California, Los Angeles (UCLA) Extension and continued work as a director, associate director and stage manager for the major networks. In 1984, he formed Buckhantz-Moses Productions with Diana Buckhantz. The team produced several Emmy-winning documentaries, among them Not a Question of Courage, East of the LA River and Dying with Dignity, each of which won at least one Emmy.

In 1987, Good Morning, Vietnam went into production at Disney's Touchstone Pictures. Buckhantz-Moses had a first-look development deal with ITC Entertainment, where in 1988 they developed the motion picture Without A Clue starring Ben Kingsley and Michael Caine for production in England. UCLA Extension asked Moses to also take on the course in Motion Picture and Television Production, which he taught for 8 years. He married Lynne Lueders later that year.

== Documentaries, Appleseed Entertainment & other work ==
In 1989-90 he produced and directed the documentary State of the City for the PBS affiliate KCET-TV in Los Angeles, declared a "must-see" by TV Guide. In 1990-1991 he produced and directed What are We Doing to Our Children with Susan Dey, for Tribune Broadcasting with KTLA-TV Los Angeles based on an idea from Lezlie Johnson, director of LA's Westside Children's Center. In 1991-1992, he directed and produced the comedy feature Nickel & Dime, starring Wallace Shawn and C. Thomas Howell for Columbia/TriStar, and he wrote, produced and directed the live/tape television special Listen Up: Young Voices for Change, hosted by CBS personality Bree Walker, in response to the devastating LA fires that followed the acquittal of the LA police who were videotaped beating Rodney King after a dangerous car chase.

Then, with a one-year-old baby and another on the way, and after 20 years of almost daily work on a stage or location on one coast or the other, Moses closed his partnership and his office and moved home. For the next several years, he raised his children, taught at UCLA Extension, lectured at other universities, and consulted to producers and production companies in the US and Europe. In 1995-1996, he supervised the development and sale (to RTL) of several TV movies for the German production company ProMedia. In 1997, he resigned from teaching at UCLA.

In 2001, he was invited by HBO to handle marketing for the network’s Aspen Comedy Festival. By 2002, with his children now in school, he returned to developing TV movies, documentaries and feature films, first with Dave Bell Productions and later creating Appleseed Entertainment. In 2002-2003, he produced Hope Ranch, a television movie (and backdoor pilot for Discovery Channel/Animal Planet) with C. Thomas Howell starring Bruce Boxleitner, Lorenzo Lamas and Gail O’Grady.

In 2004, he wrote his first book, Talk to Your Body, based on his lifelong personal exploration of faith healing and how attitude affects health, and began giving lectures and seminars on the concept. But by 2005, he realized he had strayed too far from his love of television and film production, and refocused his efforts on his production company, Appleseed Entertainment, co-founded with his wife, Lynne.

The company began producing short films Mothers Be Good and Le Chat est Mort and corporate and promotional projects for various companies, including Herbalife. Moses was then approached by American Trademark Pictures to create a 90-minute motion picture based on a multi-episode dramatic series on the history of Israel, called Against All Odds. After the completion of that project, Moses and Appleseed were commissioned to create and produce a full-length documentary that would take a comprehensive look at assistance for soldiers and others suffering from posttraumatic stress disorder. Moses was asked to write and produce the film, which he designed for PBS and international television distribution. Production took him and his crew across the US, Canada, Europe and Asia, discovering and exploring means of treating PTSD and meeting and interviewing people with the disorder and many experts on the subject. By the time the rough cut was delivered, the funding organization had decided to focus on only one method of treatment and one individual's story, and Appleseed Entertainment was released from the project. A 60-minute film was finished several years later called Taking the Hill: The Warrior's Journey Home, but it differed greatly from the original concept, though it included material shot by Moses.

Moses then began developing A Whisper to a Roar. The idea for the film came from long-time friend and Stanford University professor Larry Diamond when Diamond sent Moses a copy of his book The Spirit of Democracy. Soon, the two men joined with Prince Moulay Hicham of Morocco, a former student of Diamond's, and together they developed and produced a theatrical feature documentary inspired by Diamond's work.

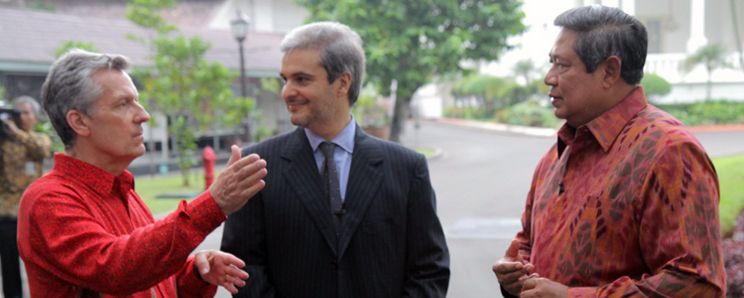
Ben Moses, Prince Moulay Hicham of Morocco, President Yudhoyono of Indonesia, filming of "A Whisper to a Roar"

The film A Whisper to a Roar took three years to complete, during which time Moses and his family moved to Paris, France. According to the film's website, A Whisper to a Roar "tells the heroic stories of courageous democracy activists in five countries around the world – Egypt, Malaysia, Ukraine, Venezuela and Zimbabwe – who risk it all to bring freedom to their people. From student leaders to prime ministers and heads of state, these activists share their compelling personal stories of struggle, past and present, with their countries’ oppressive regimes." The film premiered in Los Angeles in October 2012, hosted by Mayor Antonio Villaraigosa, the Museum of Tolerance and the Human Rights Foundation and went on to open theatrically in Los Angeles and New York, where it garnered acclaim from reviewers, including the New York Times, which called the film, "a vivid documentary...by turns shocking and inspiring". In early 2013, the movie was screened at the United States Department of State, where it received praise from then-Secretary of State Hillary Clinton, who said the film was "not only a riveting documentary, but also offers inspiration to people everywhere who seek to make governments accountable to the citizens they serve. The stories in A Whisper to a Roar demonstrate that democracy is a product of tremendous sacrifice, and we are all responsible for securing its promise for future generations.”

In February 2014, he helped edit and upload the viral video I Am a Ukrainian. He went on to film and create a documentary following Yulia Marushevska from the "I Am a Ukrainian" video and fellow activist Andriy Shevchenko (politician), member of Ukraine's Parliament, to document how their lives and country changed during and in the year following Ukraine's 2014 "Revolution of Dignity." The documentary, Witness to a Revolution, debuted at the "Peace on Earth" film festival in 2016 and has been screened for audiences in Ukraine, Canada and the U.S. and for lawmakers in Washington DC.

In February 2017, Moses was added to the Fulbright Specialist Roster (2017-2020) and in March 2017, Appleseed Press released the 2nd Edition of Moses' book "Talk to Your Body: Rethinking Healing by Rethinking Reality" based on his personal experiences, the power of the mind and quantum physics.
