= Voto Joven =

Venezuelan NGO focused on voting

- Type: Non-government organization

Voto Joven is a Venezuelan non-government organization whose purpose is to promote electoral registration and participation, as well as the correct development of electoral processes. It is made up of university students, community leaders, workers and political party activists and was created in later 2009 to promote political participation in the 2010 parliamentary elections.

== History ==
The organization is known for having motivated approximately 750,000 young people to register to vote in the first four months of 2010, a figure that was matched in the country in the previous three years.

In the early morning of the day of the 2010 parliamentary elections, members of Plan República raided a Voto Joven complaint center that had been installed at the Simón Bolívar University, entering with assault weapons and taking three computers, without a search warrant and in violation of university autonomy. Voto Joven assisted the 2017 Venezuelan consultation process, along with organizations such as Súmate and EsData.

== In popular culture ==
Voto Joven was featured in the 2012 documentary film A Whisper to a Roar.

== See also ==
- Súmate
