= I Am a Ukrainian =

2014 YouTube video

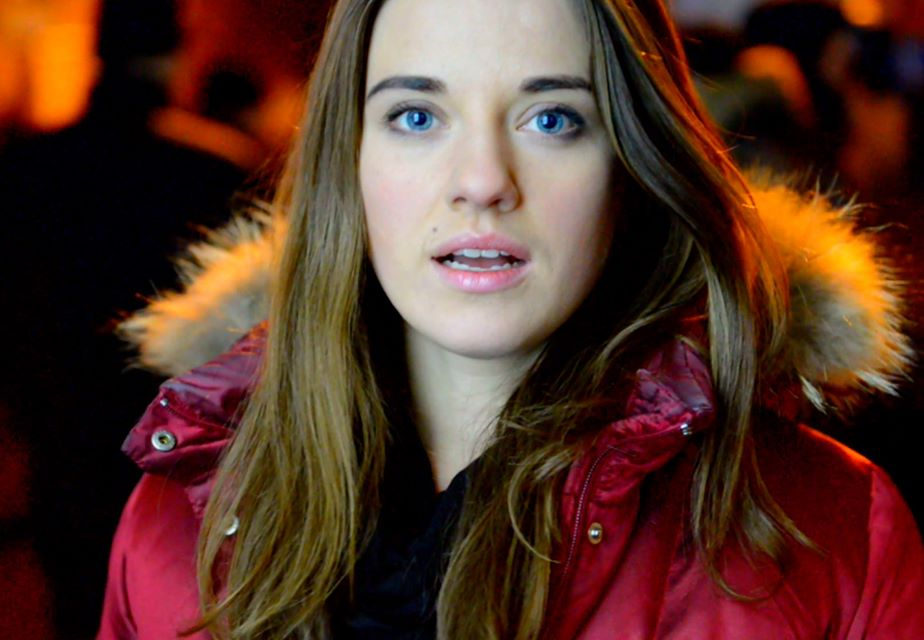
A promotional still for the video

"I Am a Ukrainian" is an Internet viral video, first posted on YouTube in 2014 featuring a young Ukrainian woman supporting the protestors in the 2014 Ukrainian revolution. At the woman's request, British photographer Graham Mitchell filmed her speaking on the Maidan, and her friend, Ben Moses, edited the material into video he posted on her behalf on YouTube. By late March that year the video had been viewed over 8 million times.

== Background ==
The woman in the video was initially not named in order to keep her safe, but was eventually identified as Yulia Marushevska, a Kyiv Ph.D. student of Ukrainian literature at Taras Shevchenko National University. Marushevska conceived, wrote, and produced the video after the death of five people, three of whom died of gunshot wounds, on January 22. Marushevska felt she needed to do more for the EuroMaidan, and was frustrated with what she perceived to be the foreigners’ ignorance about why the protests were happening. She wanted to inform the viewers that the Ukrainians want to change their government due to concerns over alleged unchecked corruption within it. They ended up shooting a 2-minute, 4 second long video where she speaks in English.

== Popularity ==
After only a few days on YouTube the video had about 3.5 million views. The video has received mostly positive reception, with the majority of the tens of thousands of comments supportive. By February 21 the video had approximately 70,000 "likes" and 4,000 "dislikes". A minority of voices argued that it is too one-sided. It has also been criticized for its professional production value, invoking a comparison to the controversial Kony 2012 viral video, which misled viewers into thinking it was a purely amateur production.

BBC News has described it as having the greatest impact of any video from the 2014 Ukrainian revolution. Moses has now completed a feature-length documentary, Witness to a Revolution, about Yulia's and Ukraine's progress in the year following her viral video.

== Aftermath ==
In July 2015 Mikheil Saakashvili, Governor of Odesa, announced that Yulia Marushevska accepted a job as Deputy Head of the Odesa Regional State Administration. According to Mikheil Saakashvili Yulia Marushevska had previously spent a year of training at Harvard and Stanford universities.
