= A Whisper to a Roar =

2012 American documentary film

- Release date: 2012
- Country: United States
- Language: English

A Whisper to a Roar is a 2012 American documentary film made by Ben Moses and inspired by the work of Larry Diamond. The film chronicles the fight for democracy in Egypt, Malaysia, Ukraine, Venezuela, and Zimbabwe, and includes animated segments narrated by British actor Alfred Molina.

== Production ==
Production of the film began in 2008 when Moses collaborated with Diamond and Diamond's former student Prince Moulay Hicham of Morocco and the team began filming in 2009. According to the film's website, Diamond "invited Moses to attend Stanford's Center for Democracy, Development and the Rule of Law’s annual Draper Hills Summer Fellowship on Democracy and Development Program, where democracy activists around the world gather to receive training and support for their work." At the program, Moses also began to gather funds for the project, only to be set back by the 2008 financial crisis. However, Prince Moulay Hicham agreed to fund the project in full soon after.

Under Diamond's guidance the five countries were selected based on several factors including: the team did not want to include the United States or other western countries because the intended audience was outside of that geographic region; and a desire to focus on democracies in different stages of the process: the student leader, Roberto Patiño of Voto Joven in Venezuela; Esraa Ahmed Fattah and Ahmed Maher of Egypt; Anwar Ibrahim of Malaysia; Morgan Tsvangarai of Zimbabwe; and Viktor Yushchenko of Ukraine. Filming concluded in 2011 with final trips to Egypt following the Arab Spring and to Malaysia to interview former Prime Minister Mahathir Mohamad.

Prince Moulay Hicham was tapped to interview many of the heads-of-state included in the film, creating an extensive library of footage that is being developed into a separate project. The final filming was completed in November 2010, however, just when the production company began to edit the project, the Arab Spring broke out in Tunisia and Egypt. The crew traveled back to Egypt again in April 2011 to capture the aftermath. They were also able to get a late interview with Mahathir Mohamad in Malaysia.

Editing of the film completed in August 2012, and A Whisper to a Roar world premiered at the Directors Guild of America in Los Angeles, on October 3, 2012, to an audience of over 600 people. The premiere was hosted by the Museum of Tolerance, the Human Rights Foundation, Burt Sugarman and Mary Hart, and Los Angeles Mayor Antonio Villaraigosa.

== Reviews ==
It opened theatrically in New York City and Los Angeles in October 2012, and went on to screen at the National Archives, the United States Department of State, Facebook, Google, and several academic institutions both in the United States and abroad. Former Secretary of State, Hillary Clinton said of A Whisper to a Roar: "The film is not only a riveting documentary, but also offers inspiration to people everywhere who seek to make governments accountable to the citizens they serve. The stories in A Whisper to a Roar demonstrate that democracy is a product of tremendous sacrifice, and we are all responsible for securing its promise for future generations."

The film was widely reviewed including by The New York Times, The Village Voice, the Los Angeles Times and Variety.

The film was released on DVD and digital download on April 16, 2013, and is available in eight languages.
