= Andriy Klyuyev =

Ukrainian politician (born 1964)

- Андрій Клюєв; Андрей Клюев
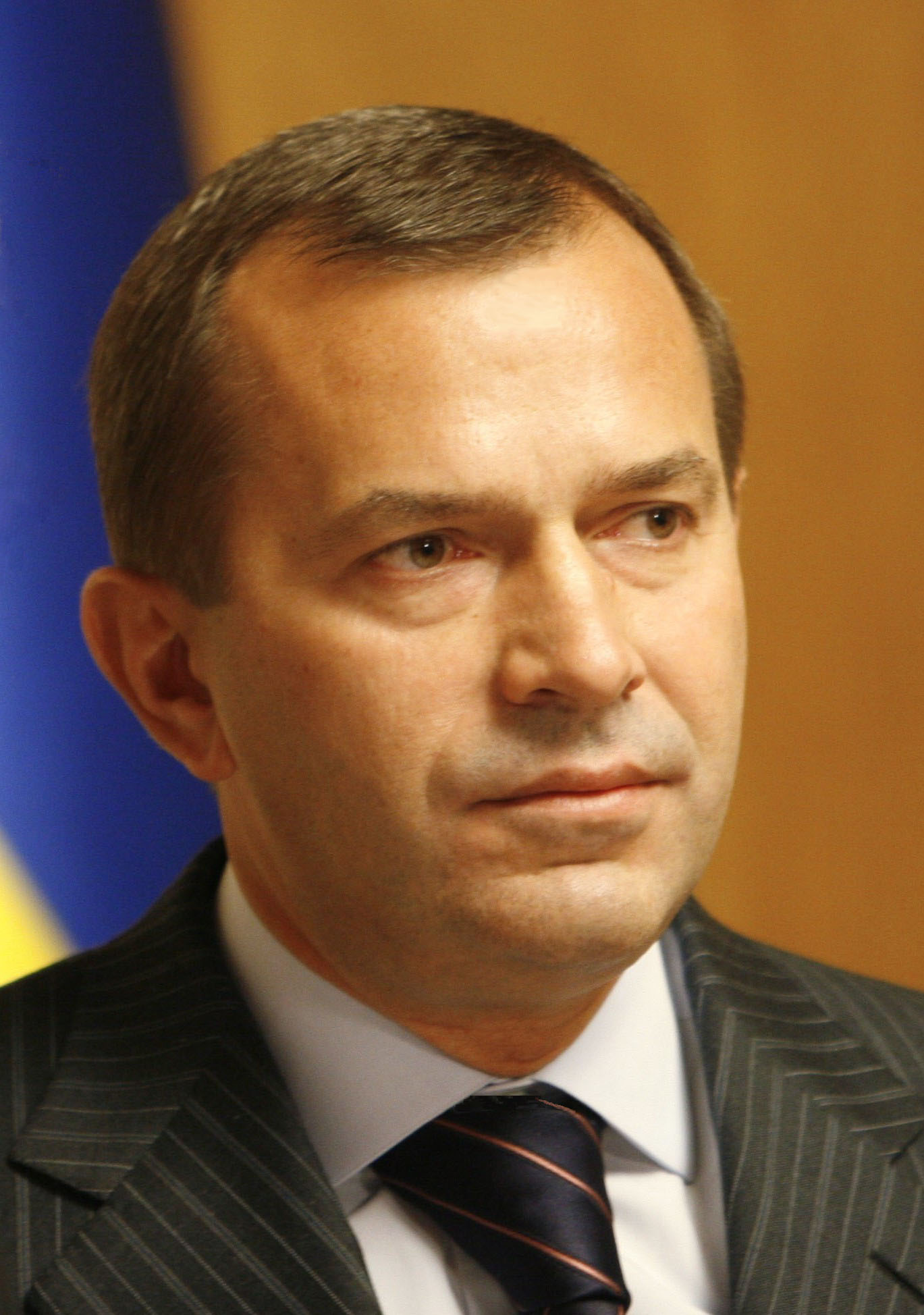
- Klyuyev in 2011

2nd Head of the Presidential Administration of Ukraine
- In office 24 January 2014 – 23 February 2014
- President: Viktor Yanukovych
- Preceded by: Serhiy Levochkin
- Succeeded by: Oleh Rafalsky (acting)

9th Secretary of RNBO of Ukraine
- In office 14 February 2012 – 24 January 2014
- President: Viktor Yanukovych
- Preceded by: Raisa Bohatyryova
- Succeeded by: Andriy Parubiy

17th First Deputy Prime Minister of Ukraine
- In office 11 March 2010 – 14 February 2012
- Prime Minister: Mykola Azarov
- Preceded by: Oleksandr Turchynov
- Succeeded by: Valeriy Khoroshkovskyi

1st Minister of Economic Development and Trade
- In office 9 December 2010 – 14 February 2012
- Prime Minister: Mykola Azarov
- Preceded by: Vasyl Tsushko (as Minister of Economy)
- Succeeded by: Petro Poroshenko

Vice Prime Minister (Fuel-Energy Complex)
- In office 10 December 2003 – 29 December 2004
- Prime Minister: Viktor Yanukovych
- In office 4 August 2006 – 18 December 2007
- Prime Minister: Viktor Yanukovych

Personal details
- Born: 12 August 1964 (age 62) Donetsk, Ukrainian SSR, Soviet Union (now Ukraine)
- Party: Party of Regions
- Relatives: Serhiy Klyuyev (brother)
- Education: Donetsk National Technical University
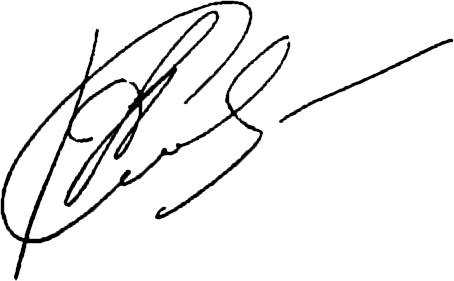
- Signature

Andriy Petrovych Klyuyev (Ukrainian: Андрій Петрович Клюєв, Russian: Андрей Петрович Клюев, born 12 August 1964), also spelled as Andrii Kliuiev, is a Ukrainian businessman and politician, who was ranked as 7th "Most influential person in Ukraine" in 2011 by Korrespondent.

Under the Presidency of former President Viktor Yanukovych, Klyuyev served as First Vice Prime Minister from 2010 to 2012, and then he served as Secretary of the National Security and Defense Council of Ukraine under Yanukovych for two years. From 23 January to 23 February 2014, amidst the escalation of Euromaidan into the Revolution of Dignity, he worked as the head of the Presidential Administration of Ukraine. His brother Serhiy Klyuyev is also a politician and businessman.

In June 2009, the Klyuyev brothers were ranked 48th in the Korrespondent's list of Top 50 richest Ukrainians with the estimated wealth of US$227 million. As of 2011, the Klyuyevs own a mansion on a 27-hectare (67-acre) site near Vienna at Tulbing, Groissaustraße 12, and a large 17-hectare (42-acre) site at Rudyky (Рудики). He was last seen publicly with Viktor Yanukovych in Balaklava, Ukraine in early 2014. Since then, he has made occasional appearances on Russian television shows, confirming he is alive. Regarding his disappearance from Kyiv since the Revolution of Dignity overthrew President Viktor Yanukovych, Klyuyev has claimed that he moved to Donetsk in 2014, which he considers Ukrainian territory (although Donetsk is no longer controlled by Ukrainian authorities since the start of the Russo-Ukrainian War in 2014). In 2019, the Security Service of Ukraine stated that Klyuyev was living in hiding in Russia, and in 2022 a British Foreign, Commonwealth and Development Office report alleged that Klyuyev, along with three other former Ukrainian government officials who served under Yanukovych, was allegedly working with the Russian intelligence services to "subvert Ukraine".

== Early life ==
Andriy Klyuyev graduated from the Mining College of the Donetsk Politech Institute as a mining automation and mechanization engineer. He also earned his Candidate of Technical Sciences post-graduate degree in 1989.

Klyuyev started working in 1983 as an underground miner at Zasyadko coal mine, before becoming a foreman at the Gorki Mine in 1984. After graduation he worked as the deputy chief and then Chief of Mine Transport at Bilorichenska Mine (Voroshylovhradvuhillya state holding in Luhansk Oblast). From 1986 to 1991 Klyuyev conducted full-time postgraduate research at his alma mater.

== Business career ==
From 1991 to 1994, Klyuyev headed several coal mining-related machine building companies, including "Ukrpidshipnyk" SC. Since March 2011, Ukrpodshipnik is headquartered in the same building in Ukraine as Activ Solar's Ukraine representative.

Klyuyev and his younger brother, Serhiy Klyuyev, sold Active Bank in March 2013, as all stakes in the solar business were sold in 2008 already.

Klyuyev has been repeatedly accused by journalists of being "a shadowy oligarch" with business links to (former President) Viktor Yanukovych's family, allegedly using his power to secure multi-billion contracts.

Andrii and Serhiy Klyuyev were the principal beneficiaries in the Austrian holding company SLAV AG. As of February 2014, the Klyuyev brothers relationships with other entities can be found online.

In 2011, the Klyuyev brothers controlled five solar plants (Crimea Solar 1–5) outside of Simferopol at Rodnykoye. All of these plants were subsidiaries of Activ Solar which is part of the Activ Solar Holding GmbH which is a subsidiary of SLAV Beteiligung GmbH, which is part of Slav AG. Just prior to the Maidan revolution, Andrii and Serhiy Klyuyev sold their shares in Vienna based Activ Solar GmbH and Clean Economic Energie (CEE) AG, which is a holding company that operates solar power plants in Crimea with 380 MWp capacity and 500 MWh annual production.

In March 2016, the Klyuyev brothers' company SLAV Handel applied for bankruptcy in Vienna at the International Court of Arbitration of Vienna International Chamber of Commerce.

== Political career ==
Starting in 1994, Klyuyev was a deputy chairman of the Donetsk Oblast Executive Council. From November 1995 to April 1996 he was a Deputy Head of the Donetsk Oblast State Administration, responsible for local development, trade, and consumer goods production.

After a career in Donetsk Oblast, and at the time working closely with later and current President Viktor Yanukovych, Klyuyev moved to national politics. On 14 December 2001, Klyuyev was elected the deputy chairman of the Party of Regions. At the 2002 election, he became a member of the Verkhovna Rada for the Party of Regions, working as head of the Energy, Nuclear Policy and Nuclear Safety Committee. On 19 April 2003, at the 5th Party Congress Klyuyev was elected the secretary of the party's political council.

From 2003 to 2004, Klyuyev was the Energy Vice Prime Minister in the First Yanukovych Government.

Klyuyev is described in the press as the Yanukovych's Shadow Campaign Head in 2010 presidential election, following Borys Kolesnikov as head of the electoral headquarter of the Party of Regions. He was however, only named Deputy Vice Prime Minister, as more influential competitors insight the Party of Regions managed to occupy the posts of the Head of the Presidential administration and the Prime Minister.

At the 2006 and 2007 parliamentary elections, Klyuyev was re-elected as a deputy for Party of Regions.

On 11 March 2010, Klyuyev was appointed the First Vice-Prime Minister in the Azarov Government, and after the Yanukovych administrative reform on 9 December 2010, he also has accepted the assignment of the Minister of Economic Development and Trade.

On 14 February 2012, Klyuyev was appointed Secretary of the National Security and Defense Council of Ukraine (NSDC). Insiders in the Party of Regions always claimed that his removal from the post of the First Vice Prime Minister, responsible for the European Integration of Ukraine, happened due to the personal conflict with the Head of the Presidential Administration, Sergiy Lyovochkin and was to be seen as a punishment for his influential position within the institutions of the European Union.

This shift placed Klyuyev, as the chief campaign manager of the Party of Regions, in the position to ensure that the Party of Regions would win the elections in the fall of 2012.

NSDC secretary sees Azarov as likely candidate for premiership.

On 24 January 2014, President Yanukovych signed a decrees that dismissed Klyuyev as National Security and Defense Council secretary and appointed him head of the Presidential Administration of Ukraine. On 23 February 2014, just after the "Maidan revolution", Klyuyev resigned from this post. His spokesman, Artem Petrenko, claimed 2 days later that Klyuyev's had been wounded when his car had been attacked while he was travelling back to Kyiv from Crimea after tendering his resignation to former President Yanukovych. Since 7 March 2014 he is wanted for involvement in mass murder. The day before the EU froze his assets.

In June 2019, the Central Election Commission of Ukraine refused Klyuyev to register for 21 July 2019 Ukrainian parliamentary election as a candidate for the Liberal Party of Ukraine in Electoral District 46 situated in Donetsk Oblast because he had not lived in Ukraine for 5 years.

The Supreme Court ordered the Central Election Commission on 1 July 2019 to reexamine Klyuyev's application and his claim that he had lived in Donetsk the last 5 years (although Donetsk is not controlled by Ukrainian authorities since the start of the war in Donbas in 2014). The same day the Central Election Commission registered Klyuyev's candidacy. Eventually, Klyuyev was not able to take part in the election as his registration was cancelled and constituency 46 was won by Opposition Platform — For Life candidate Fyodor Khristenko (who won with 38,01% of the votes).

In 2025, the Ukrainian government imposed sanctions against Klyuyev.

== International sanctions ==
For his roles in destabilizing Ukraine, his role in the Victor Yanukovych government, his support for pro-Russia individuals and entities in Ukraine, abuse of office, and for embezzlement of public funds, Klyuyev is under sanctions by Switzerland since 26 February 2014, by Lichtenstein since 3 March 2014, by the European Union since 6 March 2014, by Canada since 20 July 2015, and by the United States, also since 30 July 2015.

On 21 February 2018, his younger brother Serhiy had some EU sanctions removed for the 2017–2018 period, and later, in July 2018, Andrii Kliuiev had some EU sanctions lifted for 2017–2018. However, his accounts in the EU are still frozen until 9 March 2019, because of ongoing EU sanctions.

Political offices
Preceded by Serhiy Lyovochkin	Head of the Presidential Administration; 2014	Succeeded by Oleh Rafalsky
