= Mezhyhirya Residence =

Mezhyhiria Межигір'я
- Museum
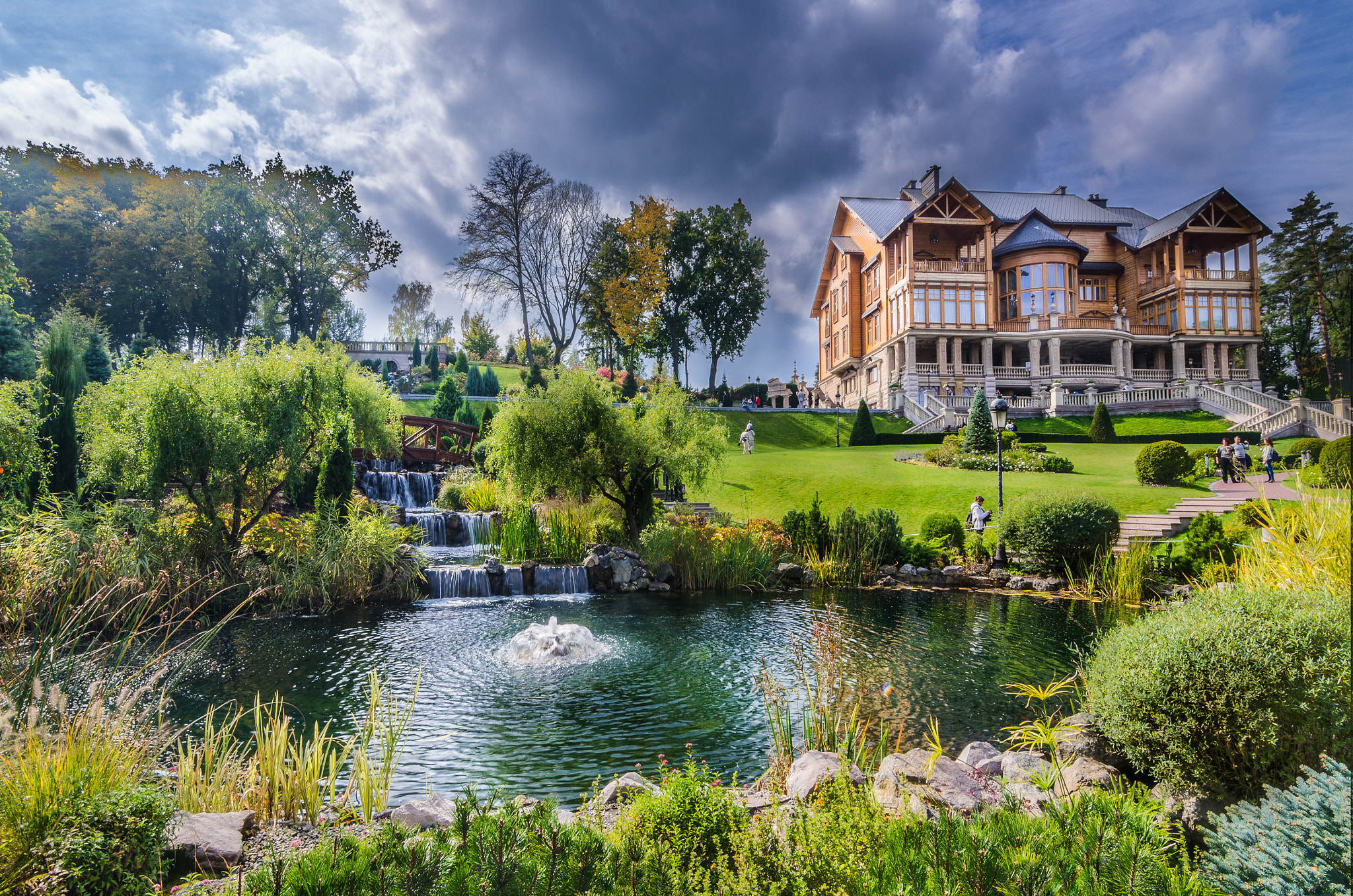
- Major landmark: "Honka" club house
- Etymology: Saint Transfiguration Monastery
- Nickname: Yanukdisneyland
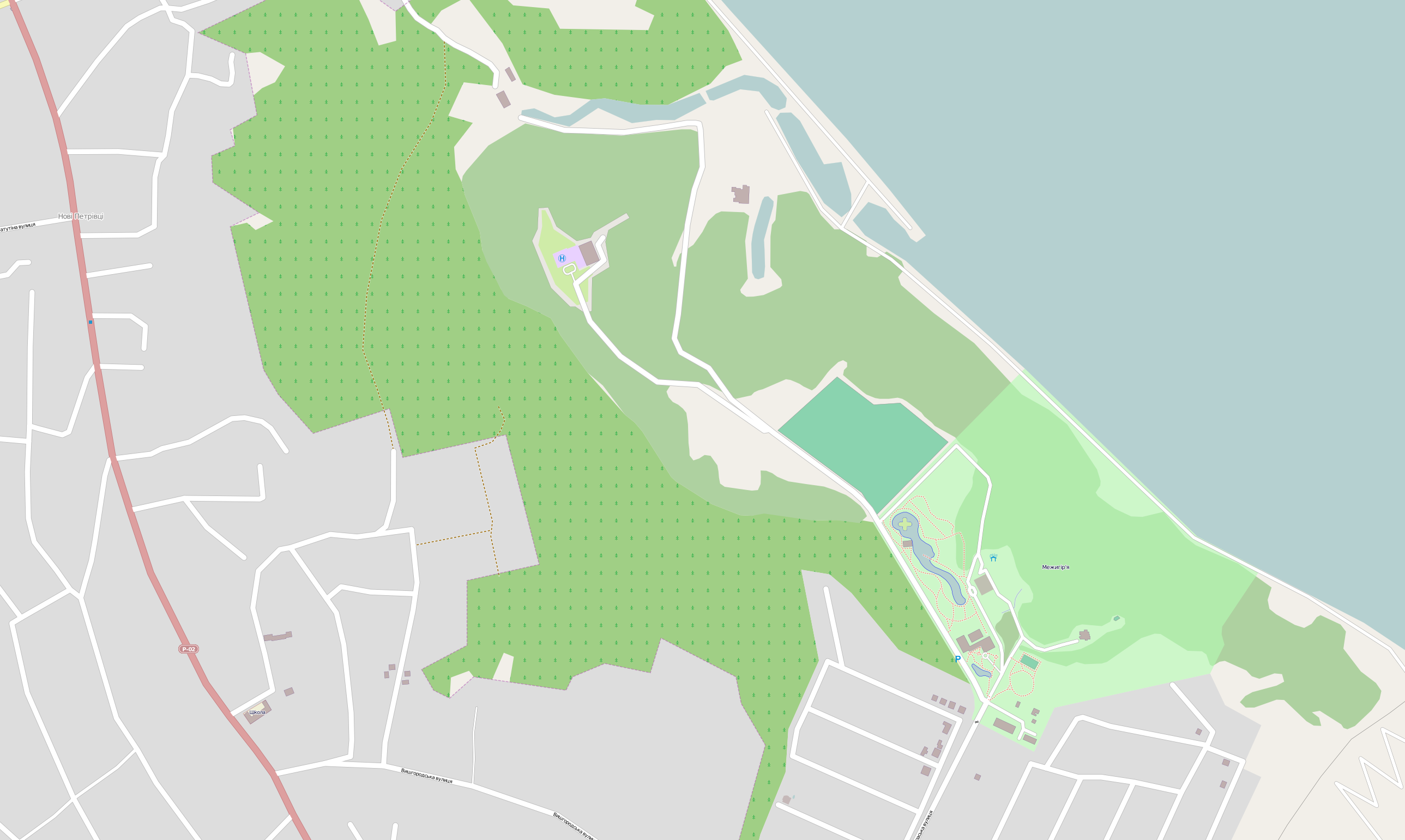
- Location of Mezhyhirya
- Coordinates: 50°36′53″N 30°28′27″E
- Country: Ukraine
- Region: Kyiv Oblast
- District: Vyshhorod Raion
- Municipality: Novi Petrivtsi
- Founded: 1935; 91 years ago

The Mezhyhirya Residence (Ukrainian: Межигір'я, romanized: Mezhyhiria, pronounced [meʒɪˈɦirjɐ]) is an estate in Ukraine where Viktor Yanukovych lived when he was Prime Minister and then President of Ukraine and is now a museum displaying Yanukovych's luxurious lifestyle. Yanukovych lived in the estate from 2002, when he first became Prime Minister, to 21 February 2014, when he fled the country during the Revolution of Dignity.

The estate was founded as a monastery that functioned off-and-on until closed in 1923 by the Bolsheviks following the establishment of the Soviet Union. From 1935 Mezhyhirya was a state government residence, first under the Communist Party of the Soviet Union and then under an independent Ukraine, until 2007 when it was privatized in the final weeks of Yanukovych’s leadership as Prime Minister. This privatization has been alleged as having been illegal, with no money being reported as being paid to the state for its sale. In 2012, the State Administration of Affairs rented a space from Tantalit for ₴99,691 per year, arranging it for official receptions. In 2014, it returned to state ownership.

In 2010, Yanukovych claimed the lease of 1 ha (2.5 acres) in Mezhyhirya cost ₴314 per month (2010) which was about $39.57 according to the exchange rate at the time.

Another luxurious residence was under construction near Cape Aya in Crimea at the time Yanukovych was ousted from office. The residence was popularly known as “Mezhyhirya 2”.

== History ==
Until April 10, 1786, the space now occupied by the modern residence was inhabited by the Savior-Transfiguration Monastery, the establishment of which is attributed prior to the period of princely epoch in Kyiv, which was liquidated by the Russian Imperial edict of Catherine the Great. A year later, the monastery was set on fire, supposedly on the order of the same Catherine the Great. Ukrainian poet Taras Shevchenko wrote about the incident: "As tsaritsa with Nechesa walked around Kyiv and the Mezhyhirya Savior she set on fire at night". At the end of the 19th century the monastery was restored as a female monastery called "Intercession of the Saints", but in 1923 was once again closed by the Bolsheviks. During 1923–1931 the monastery building was used by as a college for ceramic production. Former cells of the monastery became occupied by a commune of artists-monumentalists. In 1931 the college was moved to Kyiv. At the same year the iconostasis of the Savior-Transfiguration Monastery was destroyed.

Mezhyhirya is also the former summer house of the Communist Party of the Soviet Union's leaders since 1935. During the occupation by Nazi Germany, it was a residence of the Reich Commissar Erich Koch in a palace of the Kiev Military District commander Iona Yakir. Before its privatization by the President of Ukraine Viktor Yanukovych (at that time Prime Minister of Ukraine), the residence belonged to the State recreation complex Pushcha Vodytsia.

=== Estate under Viktor Yanukovych (2002–2013) ===
Stepping into the post of Prime Minister of Ukraine in 2002, Viktor Yanukovych received free of charge building #20 with an area 325 m^{2} (3,500 sq ft) in the residence from the Fund of State Property. On April 1, 2003 Viktor Yanukovych rented building #20 and 3 ha (7.4 acres) of land through the mediation of Donetsk Charity Fund "Revival of Ukraine". By the agreement, the rental price was ₴3.14 per month for a period of 49 years for the purpose "implementation of measures for the promotion of national and international programs aimed at improving the socio-economic status".

Stepping out of the post of Prime Minister of Ukraine in 2005, Yanukovych received another building, #20-a.

In 2008 the Mezhyhirya residence was amid an ownership controversy between the former Ukrainian Prime Minister Viktor Yanukovych and the new Ukrainian government, led by Prime Minister Yulia Tymoshenko. The transfer of the 1.4 km² Mezhyhirya official residence in Novi Petrivtsi, Vyshhorod Raion (district) to the "Nadra Ukraine" firm on July 11, 2007 by Viktor Yanukovych pulled the territory from under government ownership.

On July 9, 2007, President Viktor Yushchenko signed a secret presidential decree #148, according to the local business newspaper Delo which referred to the information of the State Directorate of Affairs. The document states: "The government dacha on the territory of the recreational complex "Pushcha-Vodytsia" is presented for a use to the head of Kabmin, Viktor Yanukovych." Later the document has never appeared on the website of the head of state nor in any other open source of information. A single official confirmation of it was given to the newspaper by the State Directorate of Affairs. The directorate explained that the recreational complex "Pushcha-Vodytsia" includes the recreational resort "Pushcha-Vodytsia" and the Mezhyhirya residency.

On July 11, 2007, Yanukovych issued a government order #521, according to which the National Joint-Stock Company "Nadra Ukrainy" received the state residency and a territory of 137 ha in Mezhyhirya. Soon "Nadra Ukrainy" concluded a barter with another company "Medinvesttreid" (Medinvesttrade) after which the above-mentioned government assigned residence was exchanged for two properties at Parkova alleya (Park alley) in Kyiv. "Medinvesttreid", in its turn, sold the newly acquired property of "Nadra Ukrainy" to some other company "Tantalit". Since May 2008 the Ministry of the Interior was conducting a search for the director of "Medinvesttreid", Hennadiy Herasymenko, who in their opinion was involved in a scheme to get the former state residence out of state property. On February 12, 2008 Yushchenko signed a decree for relieving a state property security personnel from duties at the State cottages area in Mezhyhirya. His decree canceled the previous presidential decree of January 12, 2006 where the security personnel was assigned to properties at Zalissya, instead of Zalissya and Mezhyhirya.

Subsequently, Prime Minister Viktor Yanukovych privatized the complex, already residing there while prime minister. At the time, the property's price was estimated at around ₴1 billion (US$200 million). After Yulia Tymoshenko's election, her cabinet annulled the decree which transferred the property to the "Nadra Ukraine" firm, and again placed the territory under government control. However, on July 28, 2008, the Economic Court of Kyiv City annulled the Cabinet's decision and returned the Mezhyhirya residence back under Yanukovych's ownership.

In 2009 Yanukovych claimed to have full ownership. He has not revealed the price he paid for the property, instead calling it a "very serious price".

President of Ukraine Viktor Yanukovych chose it as his residence after he won the 2010 Ukrainian presidential election. This ownership was contested. Serhiy Leshchenko, of Ukrayinska Pravda, has claimed Yanukovych owned more of the estate than he claimed, and that he managed to do so through a complex ownership structure via a network of international holding companies that ultimately comes back to a firm called Tantalit, run by a lawyer close to the Yanukovych family, Pavlo Lytovchenko. The estate's level of luxury and the reconstruction of a road to it spawned controversy within Ukraine.

During Yanukovych’s presidency, the estate became a controversial symbol of the increasingly authoritarian nature of his rule, as well as a symbol of the excess and corruption that defined his government and Ukrainian bureaucracy. Throughout his presidency, independently-aligned Ukrainian media, such as the Internet newspaper Ukrayinska Pravda, frequently detailed the excess reported at the complex, resulting in unspoken competition amongst journalists to detail the residence’s excess. Ukrayinska Pravda would spend over three years investigating reports of excess and misappropriation of public funds at the complex, with the newspaper publishing a number of documents that confirmed a link between organizations-tenants acting on behalf of Yanukovych, family members of Yanukovych and his entourage. Details of the residence’s excesses, such as the cost of its chandeliers, shocked and angered Ukrainians during Yanukovych’s presidency, with many rumours about the complex circulating throughout Ukraine in the early 2010s.

=== Euromaidan protests and aftermath ===
During Euromaidan in 2013–2014, protesters descended on the complex, especially in December 2013, to protest against Yanukovych’s government. Protests at Mezhyhirya were also motivated by the belief held by the protestors that the complex was funded “improperly”, and also by an attack on 25 December 2013 on the journalist Tetiana Chornovol, who had been investigating the financing of the Mezhyhirya residence, and was attacked after unknown men in a jeep crashed into her car. The social movement Automaidan would organise many of the protests at Mezhyhirya, which would result in many of the movement’s vehicles being recorded by the police on a list. Many cars from the list would be burned, and owners of others would lose their driver’s licenses.

On 21 February 2014, Yanukovych fled Kyiv, and the police units that had guarded the residence during Euromaidan withdrew, with some guards reported to have escaped and protesters were able to enter it. Before protestors entered, little had previously been known about the president’s home as Yanukovych had been relatively successful in keeping his private life away from the Ukrainian media. Some protestors stated that the capture of Mezhyhirya was “the main symbol of our revolution [Euromaidan], our Bastille”.

=== Transformation into museum ===
Following the ousting of Yanukovych from power, thousands of Ukrainians went to visit the luxurious estate and park for free, with some nicknaming the complex "Yanukdisneyland" (a portmanteau of “Yanukovych” and “Disneyland”). Activists of Automaidan took care of the residence from the moment it was abandoned by security forces and turned it into a public park. Since then, an employee of Kyiv Zoo has been taking care of the animals and birds at the residence.

On 23 February 2014 the Ukrainian parliament, the Verkhovna Rada, adopted a resolution to transfer Mezhyhirya as a recreational complex of Pushcha-Vodytsia to state ownership, within ten days. However this did not happen because of conflicts over control of the complex that emerged amongst some protestors and pro-European businessmen, as well as the legal confusion surrounding ownership of the estate. Looters and vandals were kept away from the complex by the former businessman and now groundskeeper of the site Denys Tarachkotelyk and his supporters, a group of protestors from the Maidan. Tarachkotelyk arrived at Mezhyhirya on the morning after Yanukovych fled and managed to outmaneuver rival factions to gain control of the entire property. The property returned to state ownership via court action on 25 June 2014. Since mid-November 2014 Mezhyhirya has been a museum which the public can visit, though the number of visitors has fallen sharply since February 2014, when hundreds of thousands visited.

The controversial nature of the complex has persisted since Yanukovych’s ousting, with some Ukrainians refusing to visit it because it is connected to the former president of Ukraine and provokes negative emotions, though others have used it for their wedding photoshoots.

During the 2022 Russian invasion of Ukraine Mezhyhirya became a shelter for the residents of nearby villages. According to Mezhyhirya groundskeeper Denys Tarakhkotelyk the complex was hit by Russian air strikes and bombardments.

Mezhyhirya was featured in the political satire Servant of the People. In the series, the location was used for the inauguration of the President, who was played by Volodymyr Zelenskyy. In the 2019 Ukrainian presidential election, Ukrainian voters elected Zelenskyy as President of Ukraine.

== Former owners (2009–2014) ==
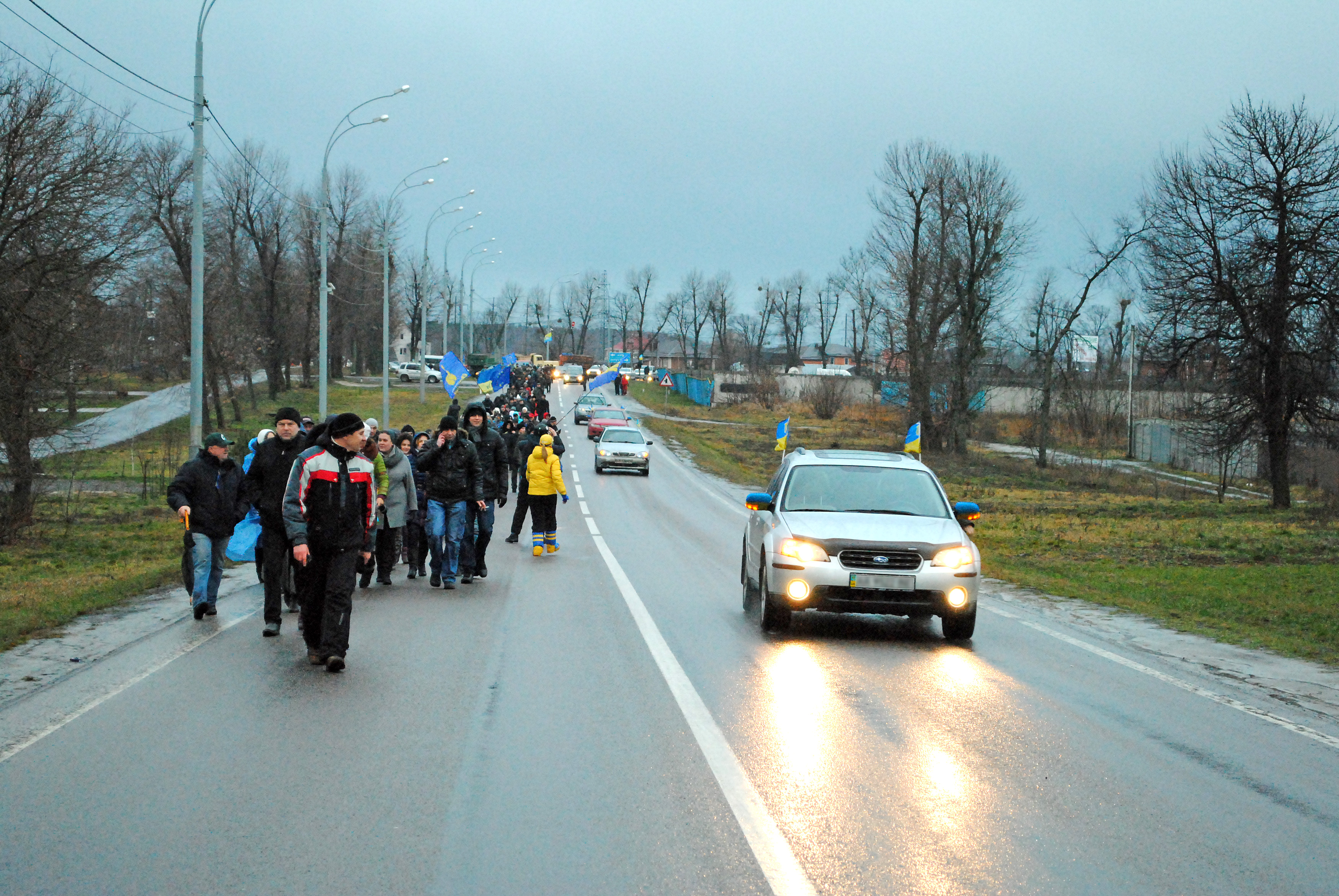
Euromaidan on the road to Mezhyhirya

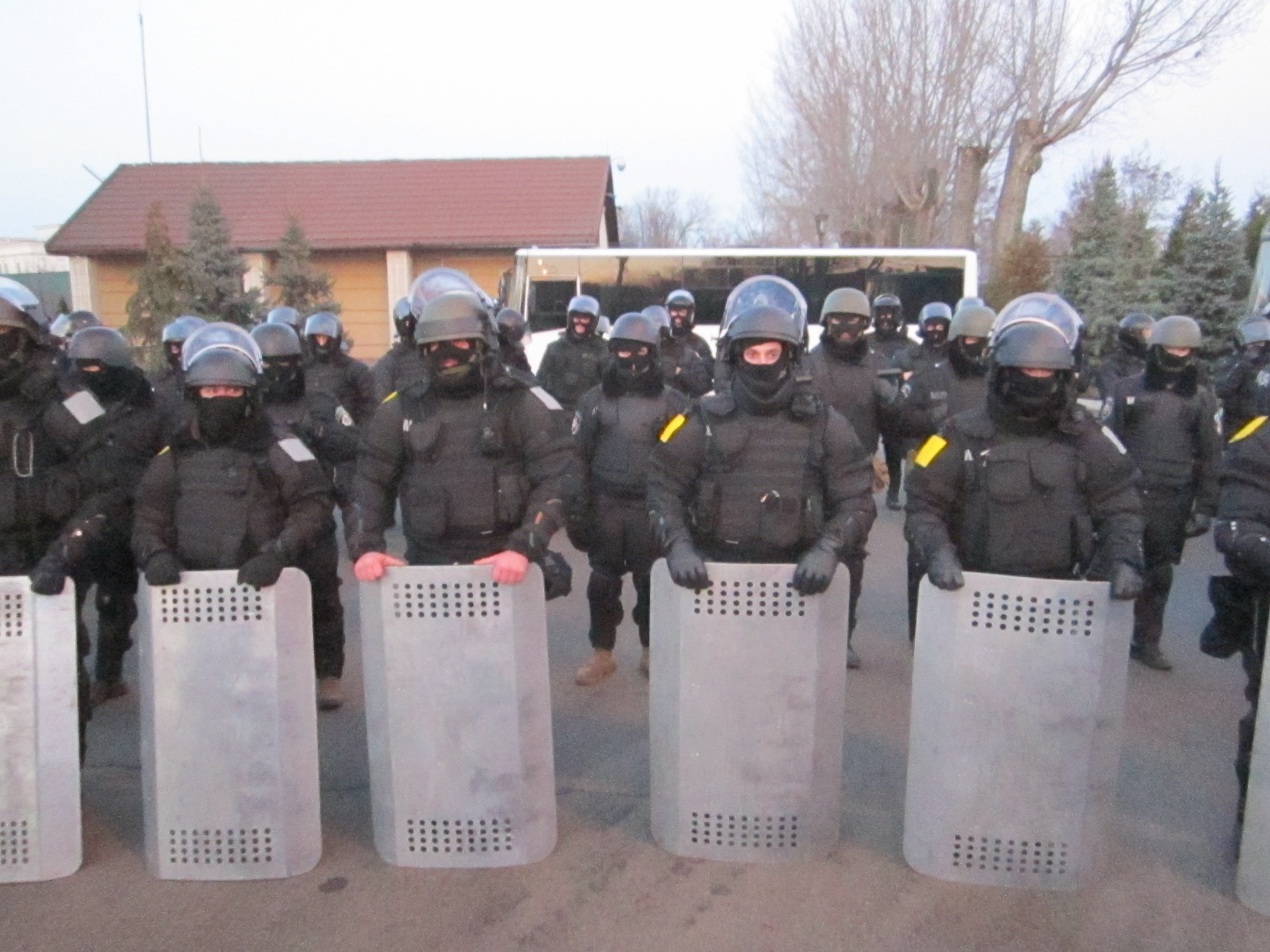
Security, with concealed shoulder sleeve insignia.

No.	Legal entity	Area (ha)
1	Tantalit	129.0
2	Revival of Ukraine	7.6
3	Viktor Yanukovych	1.8
Total		138.4

- Tantalit, LLC (“TOB”) (Ukrainian: "Танталіт", Russian: “Танталит”)
- Charitable Fund "Revival of Ukraine" (Ukrainian: Благодійний фонд "Відродження України", Russian: Благотворительный фонд "Возрождение Украины")

=== Renters ===
Before the Revolution of Dignity, the State Administration of Affairs rented an office in the residence.

=== Security services ===
- Berkut, State Security Administration (UDO) – security
- State Auto Inspection – road blocks, traffic restrictions
- Ukrainian Ground Forces (An anti-air mobile fire team of the Armed Forces of Ukraine was deployed on a breakwater in the Kyiv Reservoir in December 2012.)

In November 2011 "UkrAeroRukh" made Yanukovych's part of the Mezhyhirya residence a no-fly zone.

== Description ==
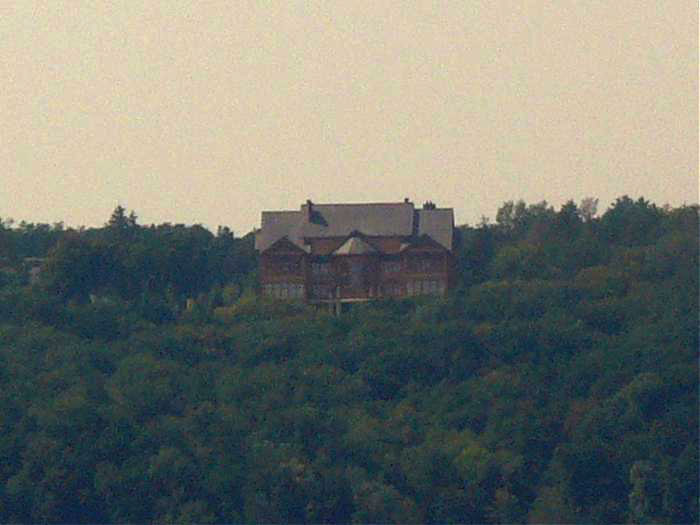
"Honka" club house, a view across the Kyiv Reservoir

External images
- Débarcadère interior
- Chandeliers
- Portholes
- Lavatory

The Mezhyhirya estate is over 140 ha (350 acres) and is situated on the banks of the Dnieper river (Kyiv Reservoir) in the village of Novi Petrivtsi, Vyshhorod Raion, Kyiv Oblast. There is a yacht pier, an equestrian club, a shooting range, a tennis court and other recreational facilities as well as hunting grounds. The estate also has an automobile museum displaying some of Yanukovych’s former exotic cars, a golf course, an ostrich farm, a dog kennel, numerous fountains and man-made lakes, a helicopter pad, and a small church. The entire complex is enclosed by a five-meter tall fence along the perimeter.

=== Club house (Honka) ===
The main feature of the residence is the so-called "club house", also known as "object Honka" (after the Finnish log home manufacturer Honka). The building is located on territory belonging to the charitable fund "Revival of Ukraine". During 2009 and the first half of 2010, materials worth ₴76 million ($9.5 million) were delivered, for renovation of the house.

In 2010, speaking before the German public in Berlin, Viktor Yanukovych actually refuted his previous statements that he had nothing other than his house on the territory of "Mezhyhirya". Speaking that in his personal life he prefers "German quality", he noted: "It's no big secret to anyone... I built one such house, a club house... It was built by "Honka", a Finnish company..." After he fled the country during the Revolution of Dignity, Honka was squatted in by activists.

=== Barge ===
According to Ukrayinska Pravda, a reception house was designed for Viktor Yanukovych in 2011, based on a barge that was brought to Mezhyhirya and moored in the inner harbor (50.622619°N 30.470602°E). Officially, it is registered to the company Tantalit. The length of the "palace on the water" is around 50 m (160 ft). The windows are decorated as round portholes.

As reported by Ukrayinska Pravda, the barge has a personal office and a hall for receptions. The "palace" is decorated with wood of valuable species, gold leaf, marble and crystal. In the niche of the ceiling of the main hall, there are three chandeliers, the price of one of which was estimated by Ukrayinska Pravda at $97,000.

=== Books ===
A journalist at Ukrayinska Pravda found various "ancient treasures of Ukrainian literature" in the residence on 25 February 2014, including the alleged first printed book in Ukraine (dating from 1654) by Ivan Fyodorov.

== Photo gallery ==
=== Honka club house ===
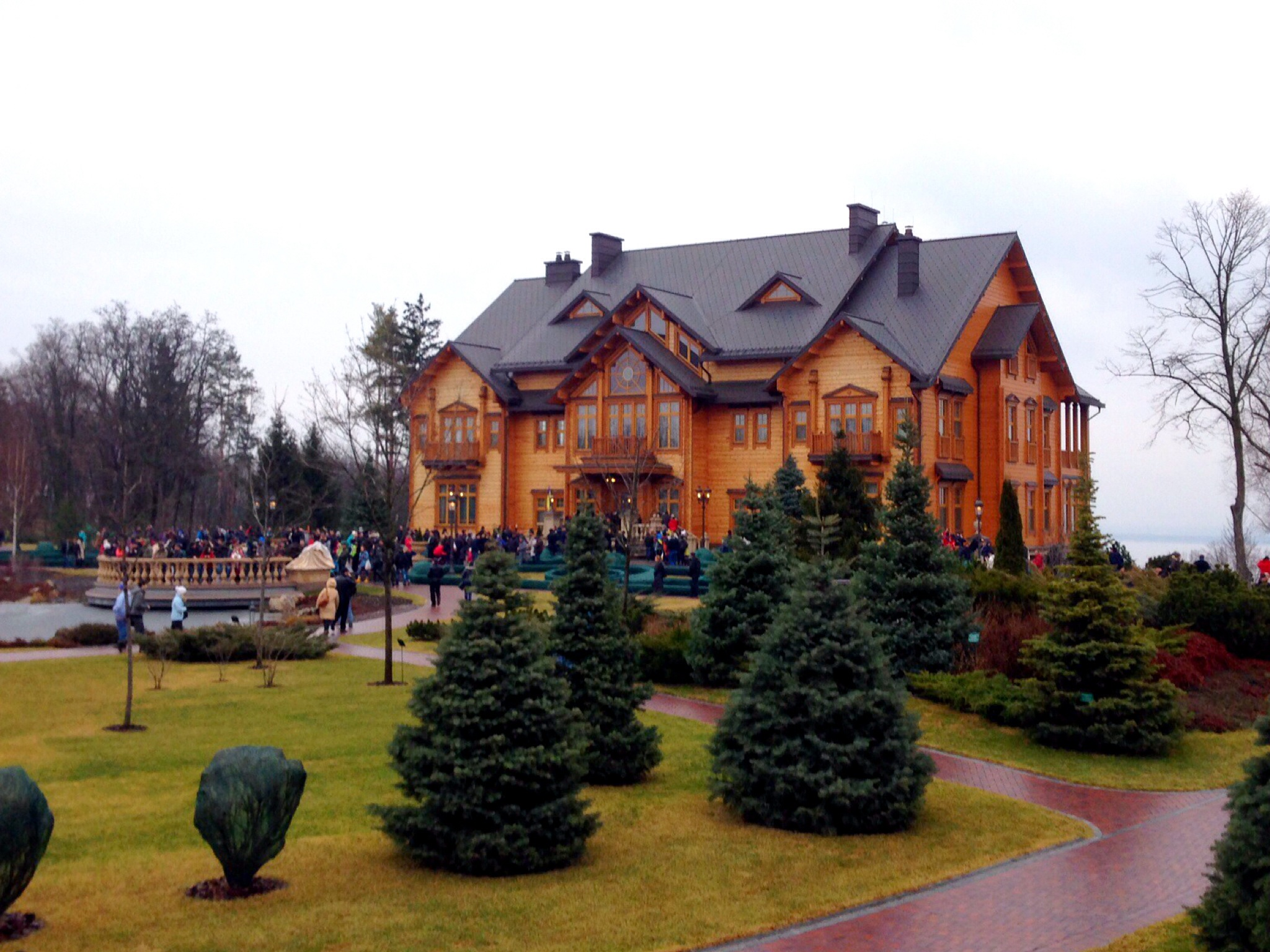
"Honka" club house

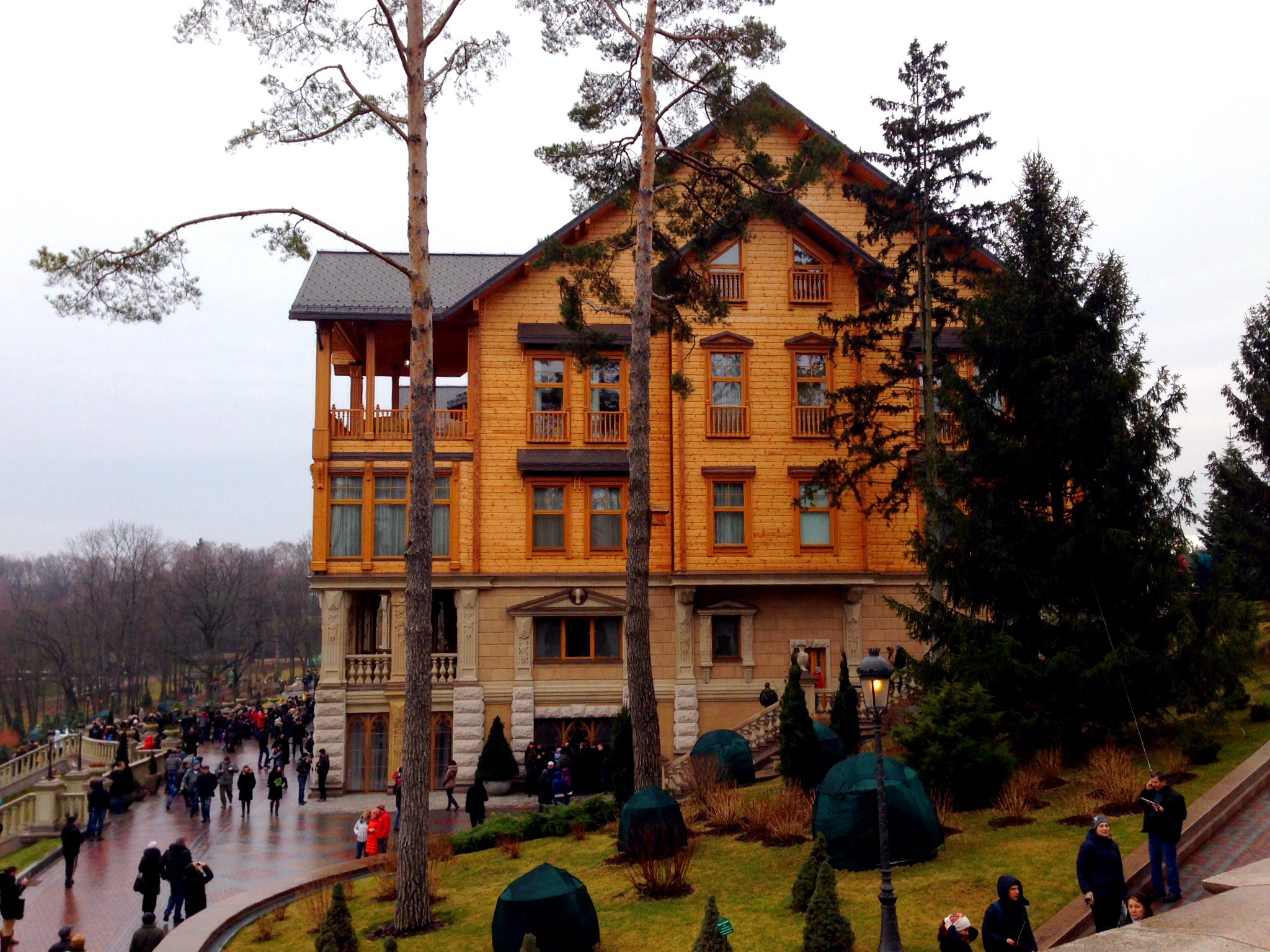
"Honka", side view

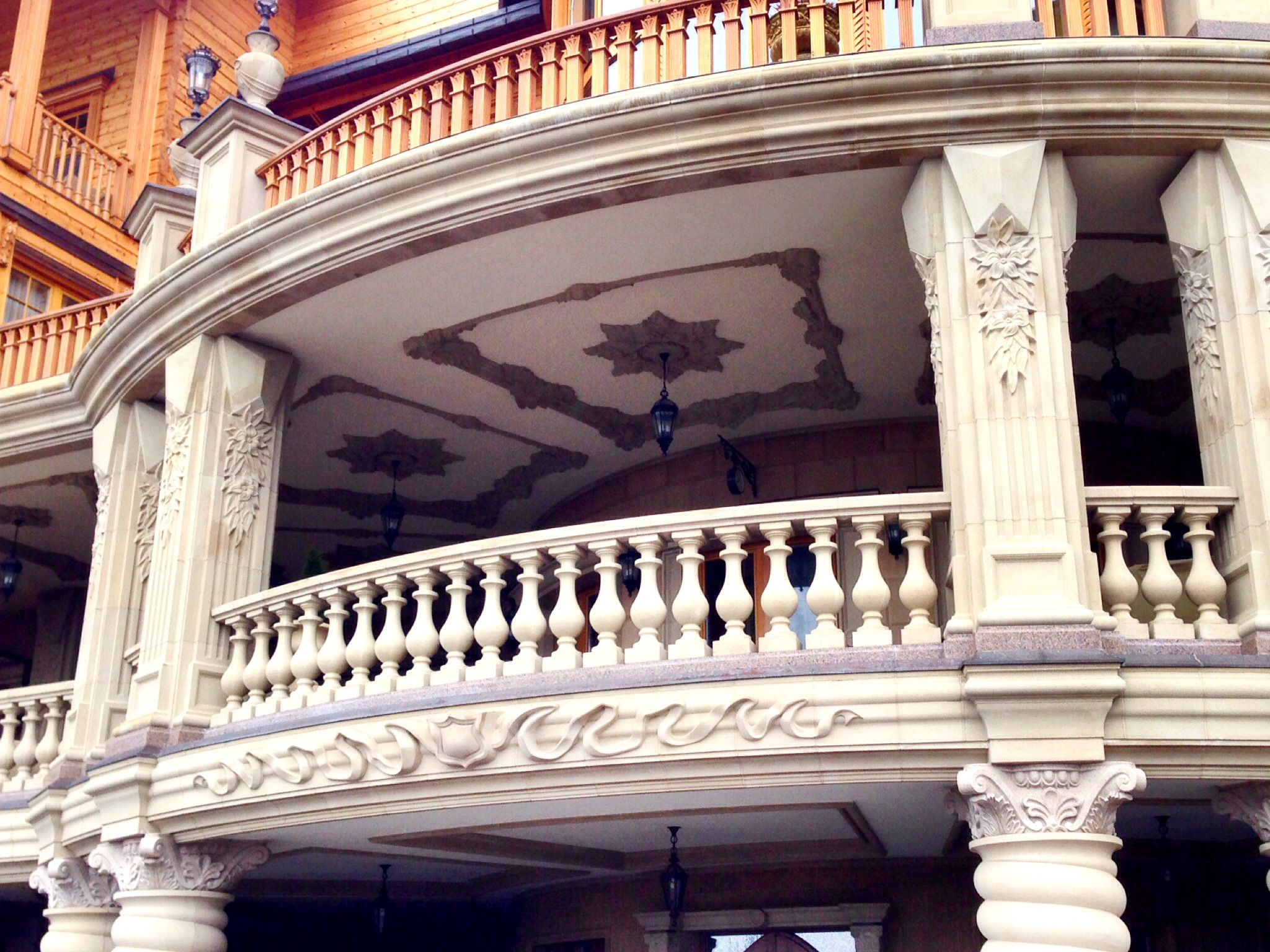
Honka's balcony, close up

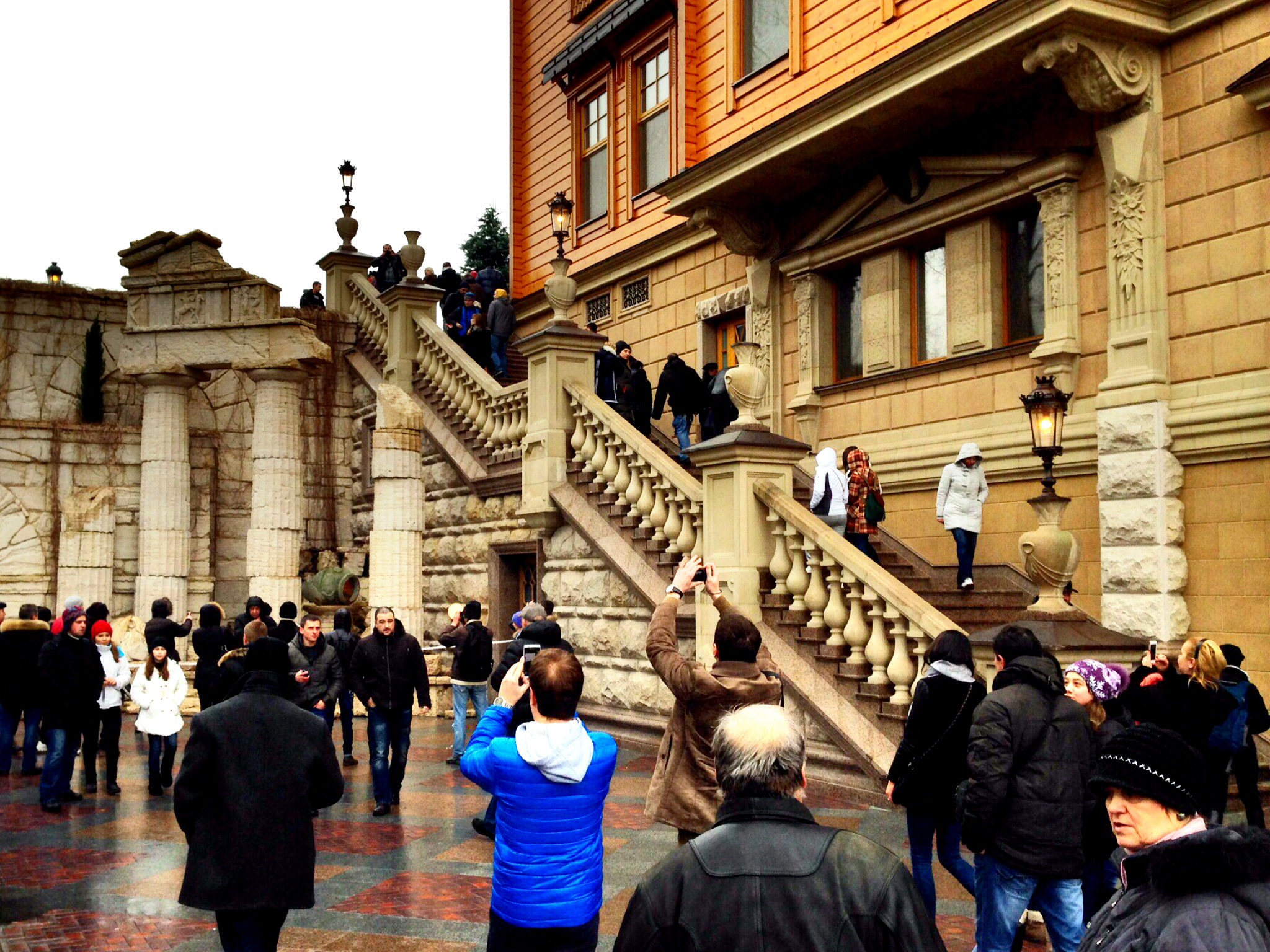
Side stairs (Honka)

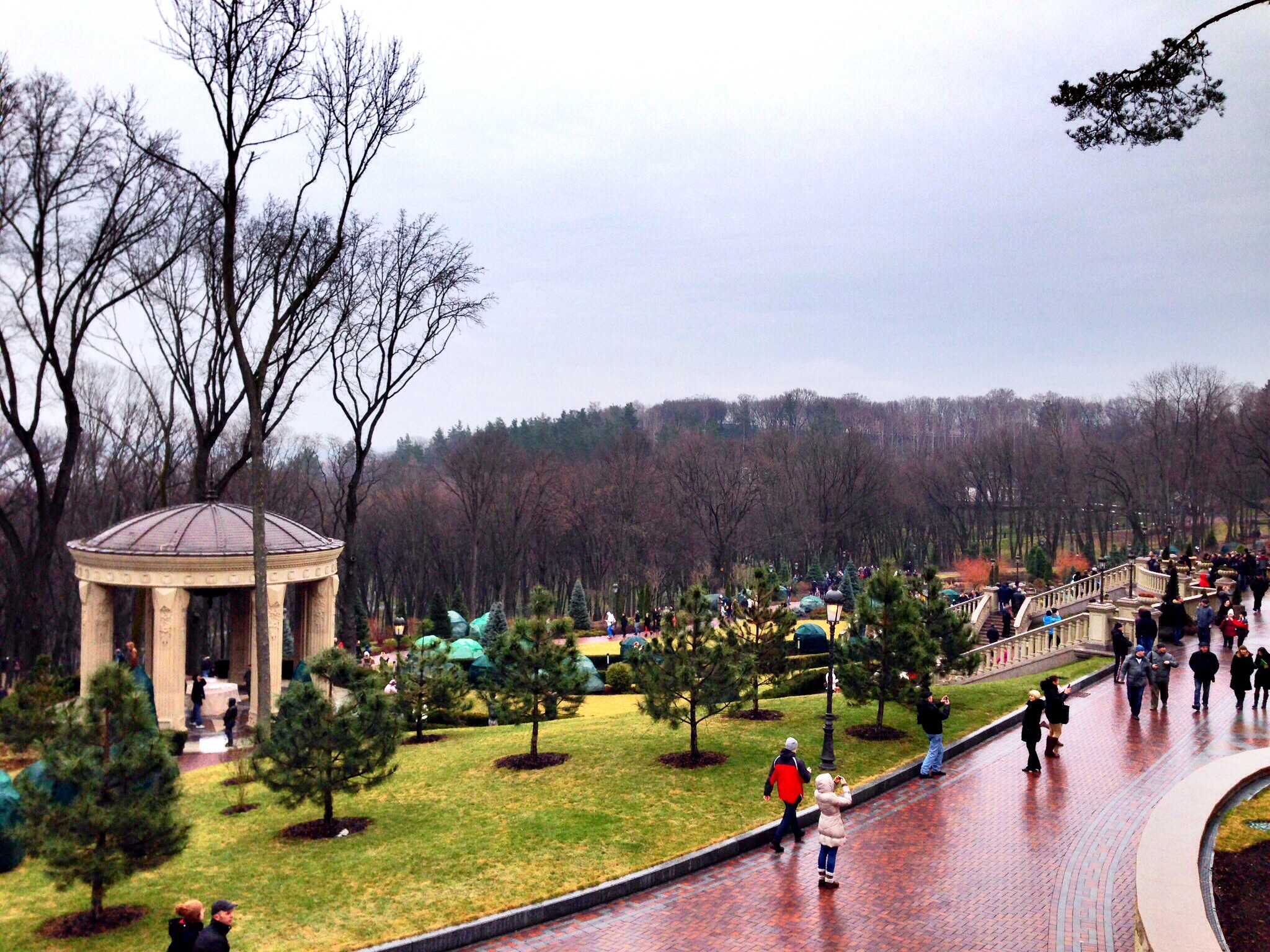
Park surrounding Honka

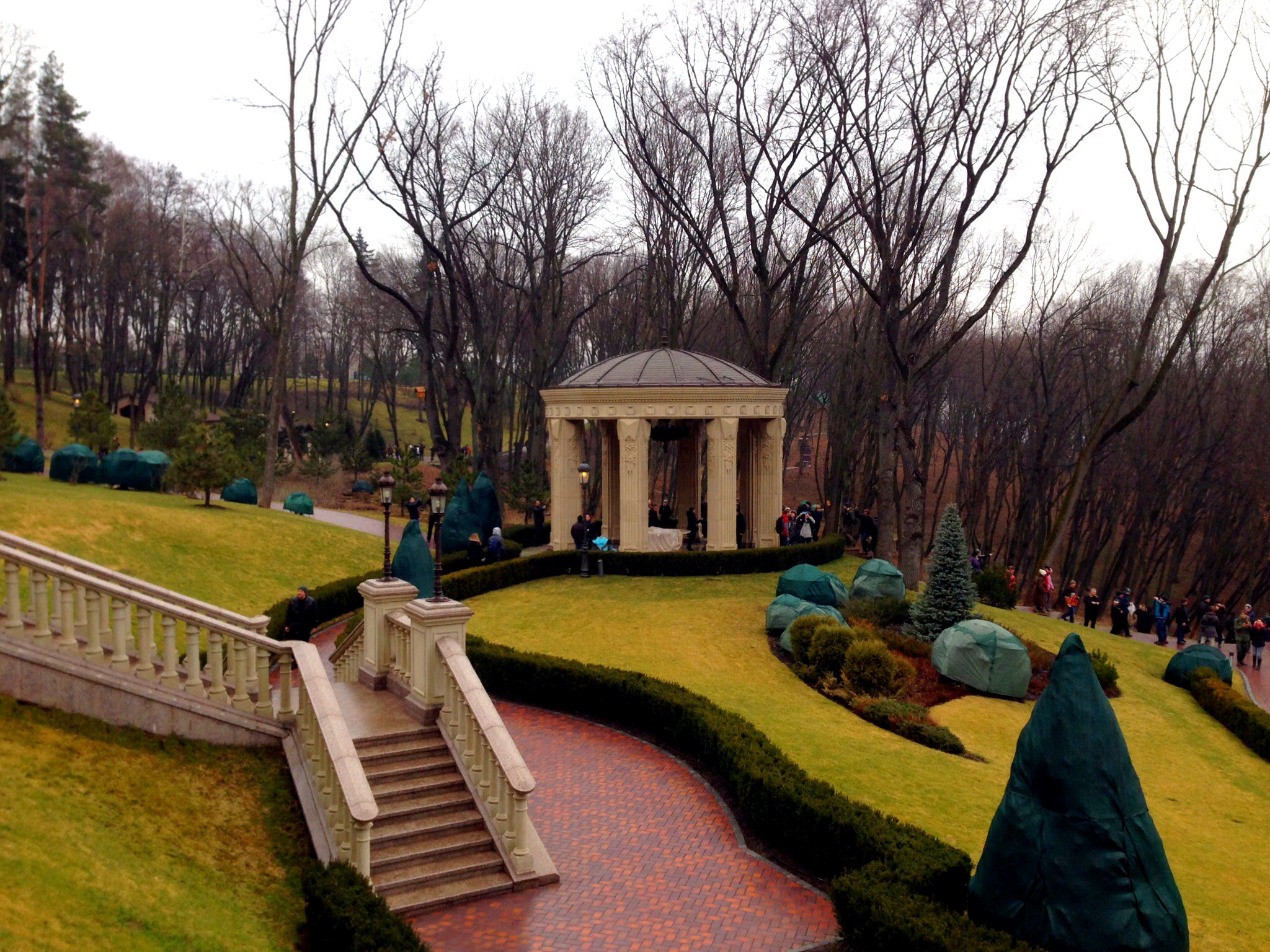
Gazebo near Honka

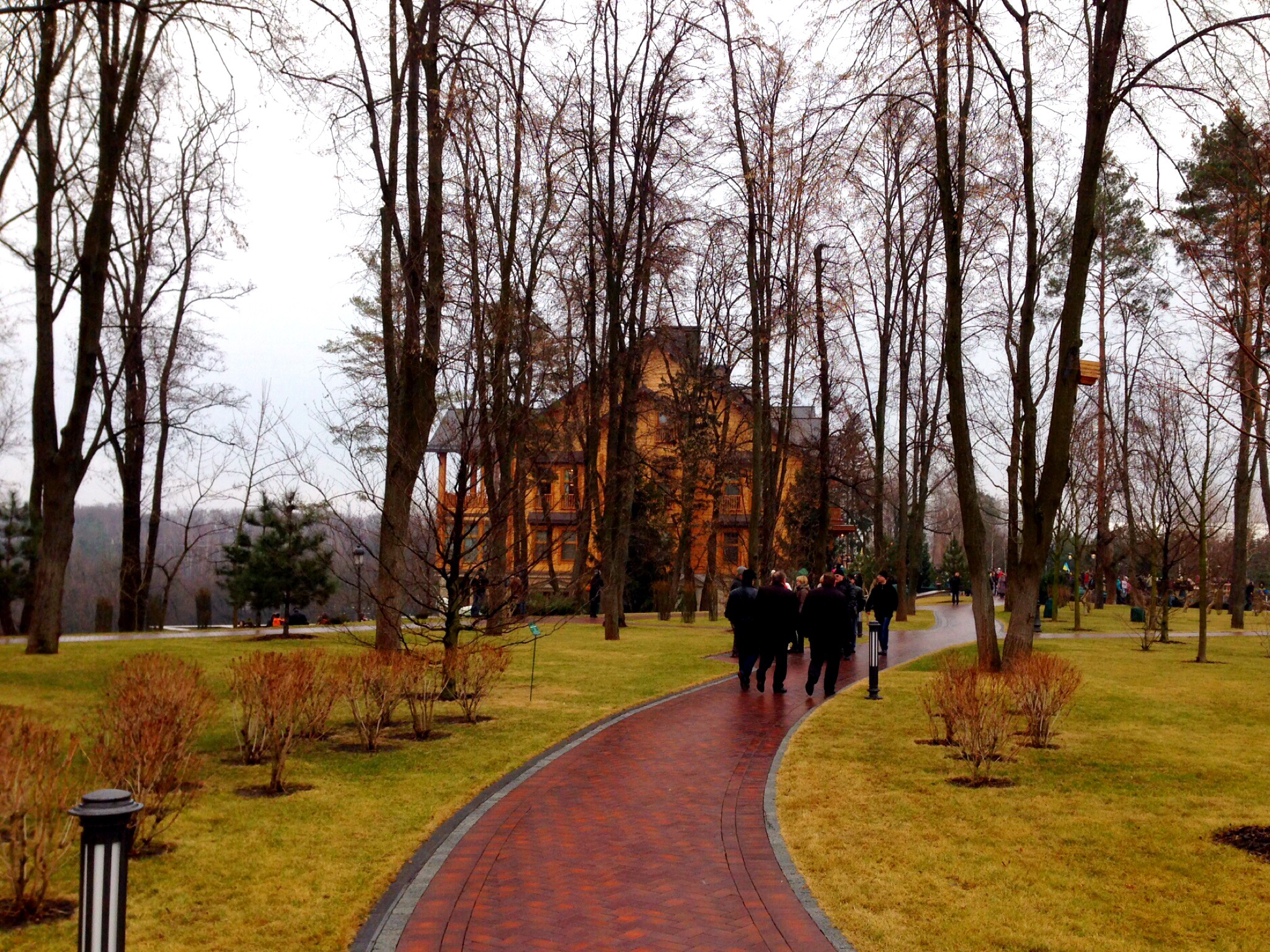
Park area walkways

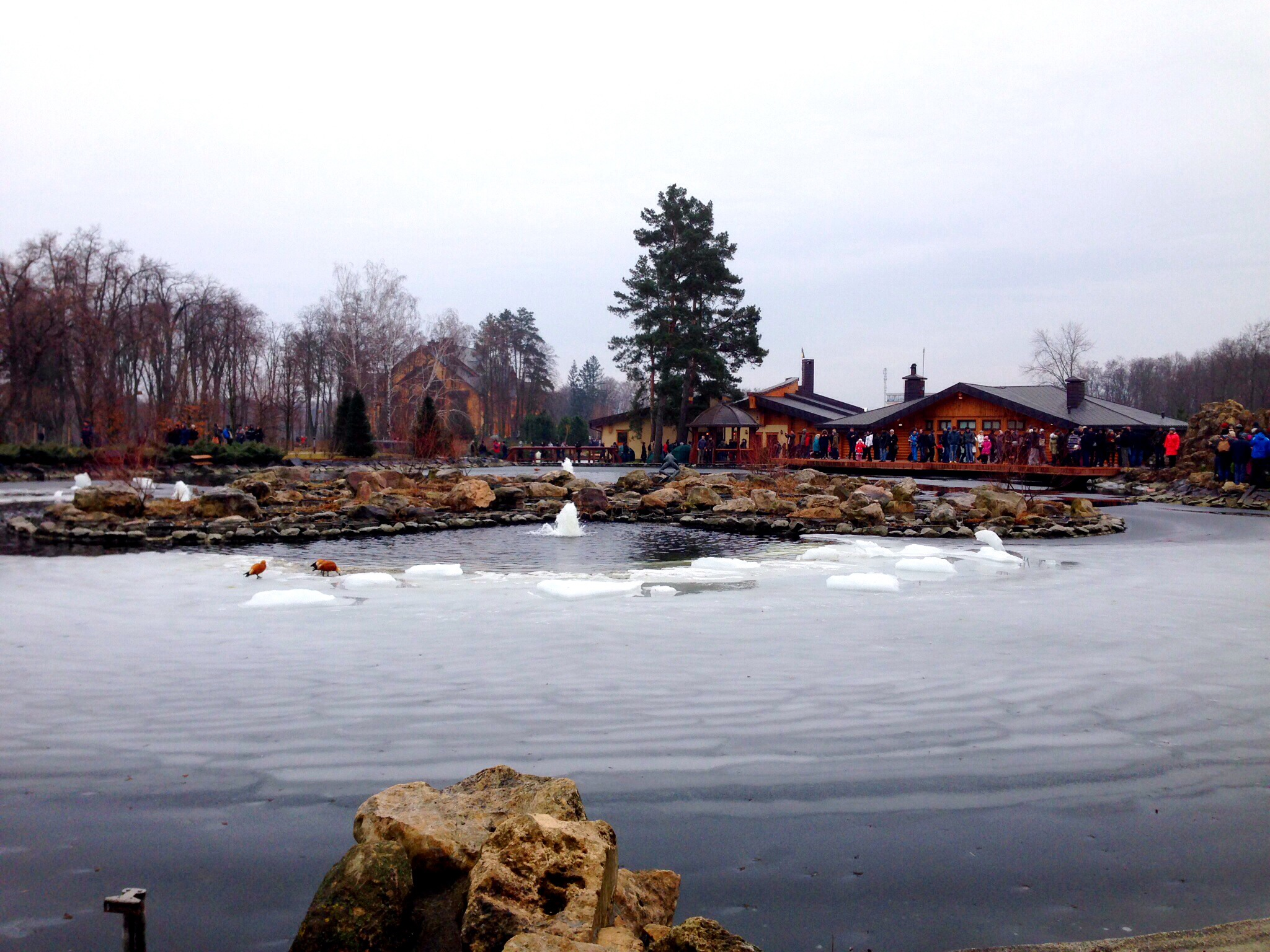
Main lake with "Honka" in background

=== Other features ===
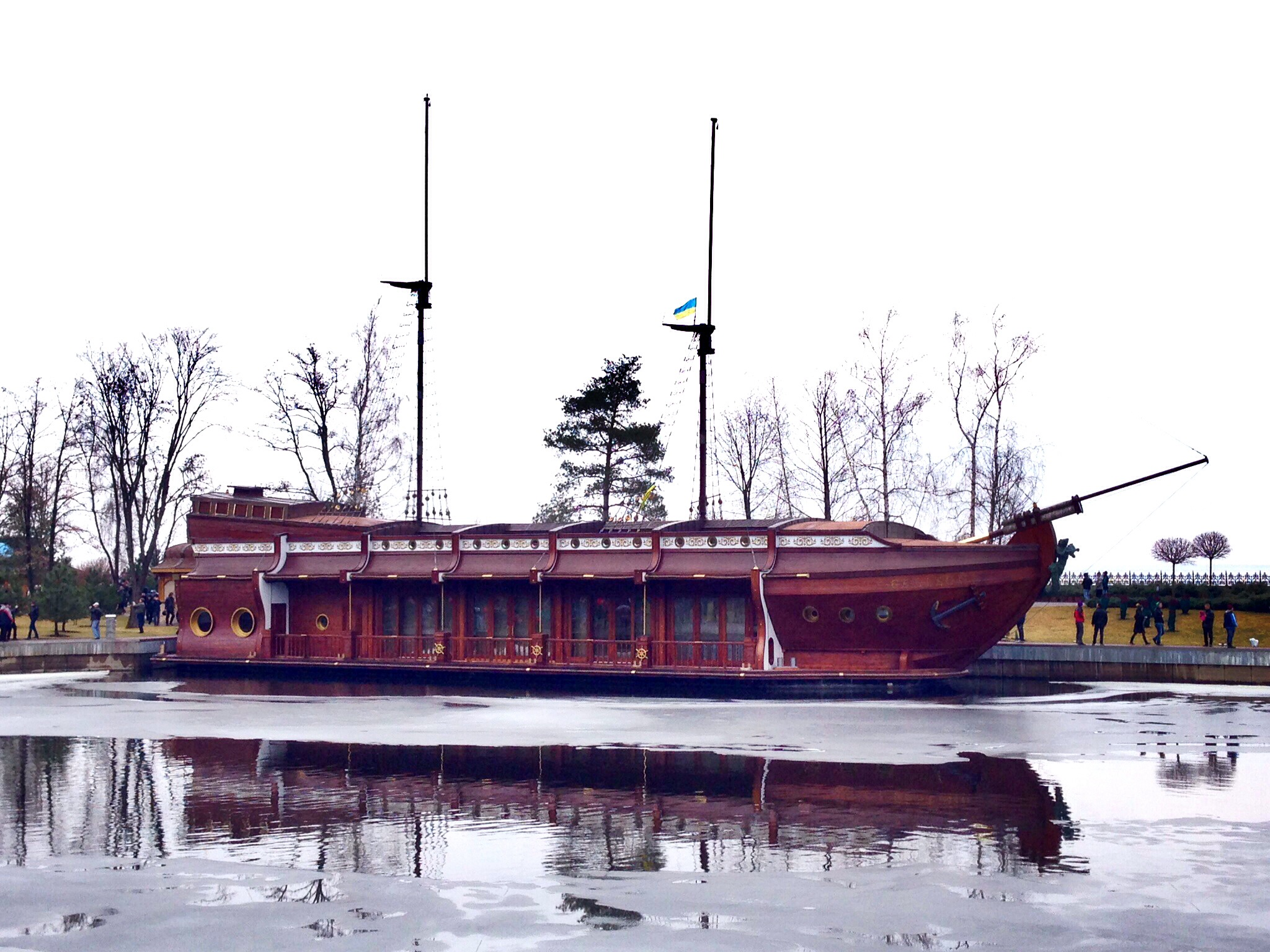
"Galleon" barge

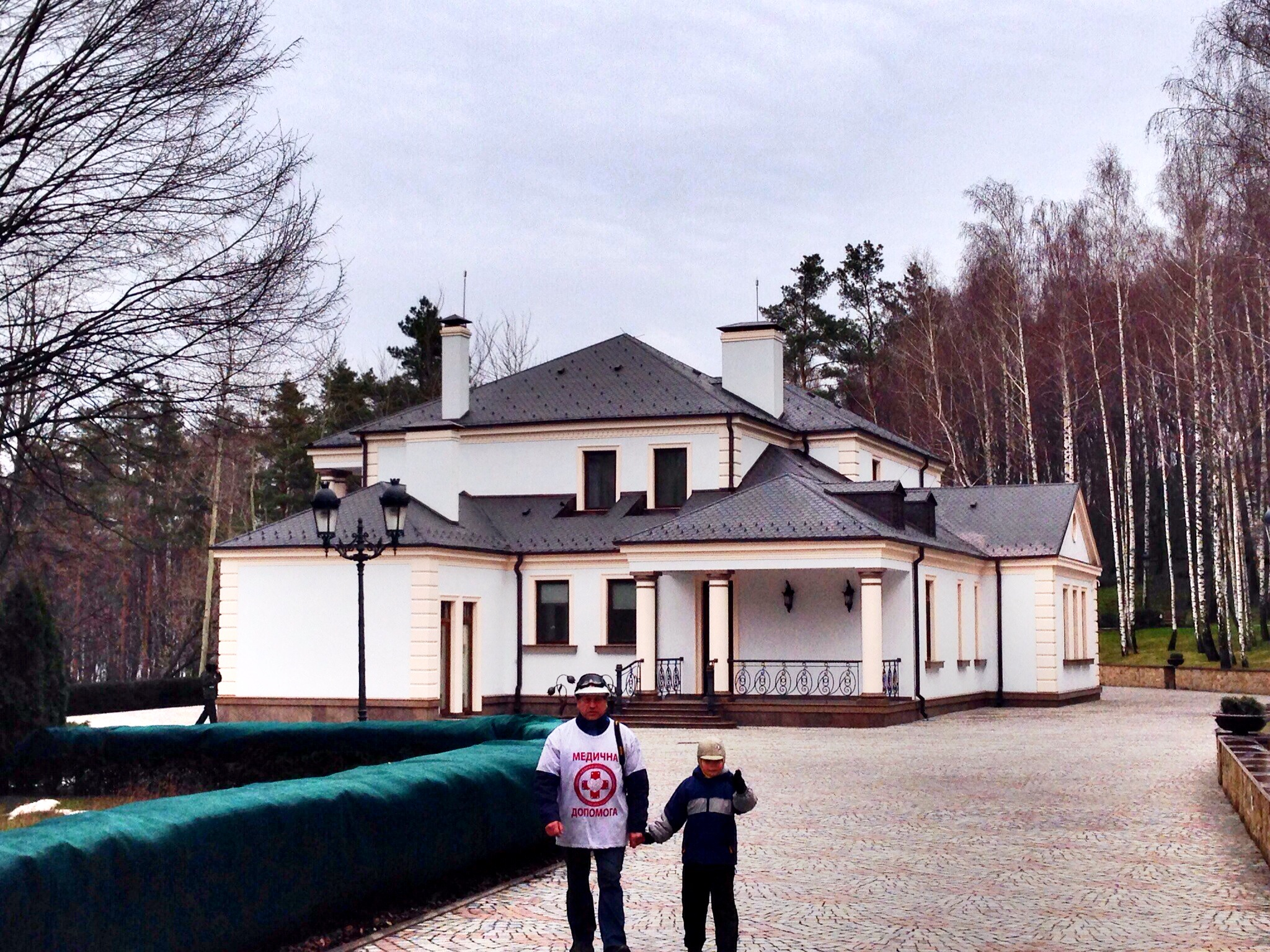
Guest house

=== Panoramic photos of Mezhyhirya ===
A group of photographers made a series of 360° panoramic photos outside and inside the buildings in Mezhyhirya on 11 March 2014, available on the website of the German news magazine Der Spiegel.

== See also ==
- Putin's Palace
- Millerhof
