= Serhiy Klyuyev =

Ukrainian businessman and politician

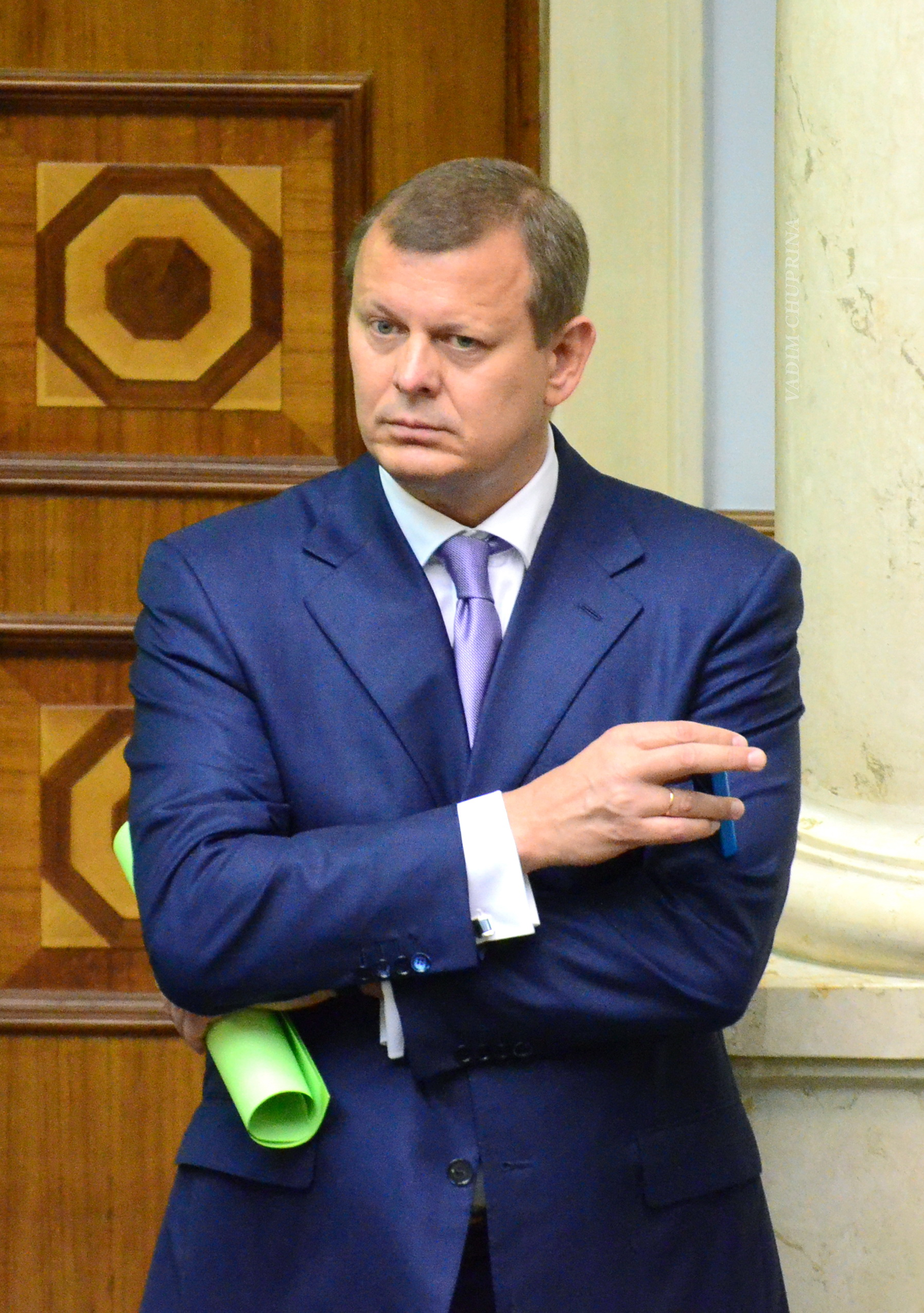
Serhiy Klyuyev

Serhiy Petrovych Klyuyev (also spelled: Sergiy Klyuyev; Ukrainian: Сергій Петрович Клюєв) is a Ukrainian businessman and a former member of the Ukrainian Parliament.

Serhiy Klyuyev was born on August 19, 1969, in Donetsk (Soviet Union). He is the brother of another politician Andriy Klyuyev. From 2006 to 2019 he was a deputy in the Verkhovna Rada (the national parliament of Ukraine) and the formal owner of the Mezhigorye residence of former President Viktor Yanukovych.

In 2014, the EU imposed personal sanctions against the brothers, but in the years 2018-2019 they lifted them – first for Sergey, and then for Andrey.

== Political career ==
From 2002 to 2005, Serhiy Klyuyev was Deputy Chairman of the Donetsk Regional State Administration.

In 2006, he became a Member of the Parliament of the 5th legislation period as a member of the Party of Regions.

From April 2006, he was a Member of the Permanent Parliamentary Delegation to PACE.

In 2007, he became a Member of the Board of the National Bank of Ukraine as well as the Chairman of the Austria-Ukraine Inter-Parliamentary Friendship Group, Chairman of the Parliamentary Sub-Committee on Banking and Foreign Currency Policy, a member of the Parliamentary Committee on Finance and Banking and a member of the Ukraine-Azerbaijan and Ukraine-Japan Inter-Parliamentary Friendship Groups.

In 2012, he was re-elected into parliament on the party list of Party of Regions.

Since November 2012 he has been a member of the Ukraine–Austria Inter-Parliamentary Friendship Groups and Chairman of the Ukraine-China and Ukraine-USA Inter-Parliamentary Friendship Group.

In the October 2014, Klyuyev was again re-elected into parliament at the Ukrainian parliamentary election; this time as a non-partisan candidate after winning a single-member districts seat in Artemivsk with 47.47% of the votes.

Since November 2014, he was a member of the Verkhovna Rada of Ukraine Committee on Fuel and Energy Complex, Nuclear Policy and Nuclear Safety and a member of the Ukraine–Austria, Ukraine–China and Ukraine-USA Inter-Parliamentary Friendship Groups.

Klyuyev did not take part in the 2019 Ukrainian parliamentary election.

== Activ Solar ==
In Ukraine, Klyuyevs owned the “Ukrpodshipnik” group of companies, “Semiconductor Plant” and the Activ Solar company, which is registered in Austria. The latter built solar power plants in the Crimea, Odesa and Mykolaiv regions.

The Verkhovna Rada adopted the "green tariff" for renewable energy source in 2009 during the premiership of Yulia Tymoshenko.

Klyuyev brothers were managing four solar power plant complexes in Crimea and constructing two more.

== Criminal prosecution ==
In February 2014, the Office of the State Prosecutor in Vienna opened a criminal proceeding against the Klyuyevs and their associates for unlawful obstruction of peaceful protests, abuse of power and misappropriation of property.

Thus, on 11 December 2014 the High Court of Vienna found that the initial suspicion was unsubstantiated.

On 28 January 2016, the General Court of the EU annulled the financial sanctions imposed upon Ukrainian Member of Parliament Serhiy Klyuyev by the Council of the EU.

In 2017, Deutsche Welle wrote that Klyuevs’ companies did not return almost ₴28 billion or $1 billion to Ukrainian state banks. The Ukrainian government had to cover the losses of the banks from the state budget. Journalists calculated that each Ukrainian taxpayer paid ₴2,000 (about $75) for the debts of the Klyuyev brothers.

On June, 30, 2023 the Arbitration Court of the Republic of Crimea (case № А83-10669/2017) found that “no convincing and sufficient evidence was provided in the case with respect to Andriy and Serhiy Klyuyev” and there was no ground for bringing to subsidiary responsibility of Klyuyev brothers. According to the documents submitted, SLAV AG and its beneficiaries didn’t retain corporate control over the debtor after 2012. The arguments regarding the actual connection of such individuals and legal entities with Klyuyev brothers and indirectly, through them, with the debtor, are not supported by reliable evidence.

On 21 February 2018, the European Court of Justice ruled on the illegality of the last wave of sanctions imposed by the EU Council in 2017 on Serhiy Klyuyev. In its decision, the court noted that the European Council, introducing sanctions, should have checked grounds for accusations against those named and if there were grounds for "doubting the authenticity of evidence," which Ukraine provided the EU.

On 5 March 2018, the Council of the European Union lifts sanctions from MP Serhiy Klyuyev. According to Council Decision (CFSP)2018/333 of 5 March 2018 all 28th European Union member Countries remove the sanctions from MP Sergiy Klyuyev as well.

On 16 March 2018, HM Treasury of the UK and the Government of Liechtenstein also excluded Sergiy Klyuyev from their asset freeze lists.

On 26 March 2018, Montenegro, Albania, Norway, Ukraine and the Republic of Moldova, aligned themselves with this decision and lifted the sanctions on Klyuyev.

== Professional career ==
From 1992 to 1994, Klyuyev was Commercial Director of Trade House Pidshipnik Ltd., a joint-venture company.

Then, from 1994 to 2000 he was Vice-president and Chairman of the Ukrpidshipnik Supervisory Board.
From 1997 to 2002 and for some months in 2005 he was a member of the Board of Directors of Slav AG Company in Vienna.

From 2000 to 2002 and 2005–2006 he was CEO of the Ukrpidshipnik Group.

Klyuyev and his brother Andriy Klyuyev sold Active Bank in March 2013.

In 2008, in according to the "Focus" rating the assets of Andriy and Serhiy Klyuyev was estimated at $635 million.

In 2011 and 2012, the Klyuyev brothers were ranked in the “Focuse’s” list of richest Ukrainians with the estimated assets of $850 million.

== Education ==
From 1987 to 1992, Serhiy Klyuyev studied at the Donetsk National Technical University (Donetsk Politechnic Institute). Upon graduation he received Bachelor of Science in Mining Engineering (the same specialization as his brother).

He is an author and a holder of some 39 patents in the field of non-ferrous metallurgy, cable production and electric engineering.

== Personal life ==
Klyuyev is married to Iryna (born 1964) and has a daughter named Olha and a son named Andriy (1992).
