= 6th Ukrainian Verkhovna Rada =

(Ukraine) Verkhovna Rada of Ukraine of the 6th convocation
←	5th Verkhovna Rada	7th Verkhovna Rada	→
- Seat composition of the 6th Verkhovna Rada.

Overview
- Meeting place: Verkhovna Rada building
- Term: 23 November 2007 – 12 December 2012
- Election: 2007 parliamentary election
- Government: 28 committees
- Website: iportal.rada.gov.ua
- Members: 450 / 450
- Chairman: Arseniy Yatsenyuk; Volodymyr Lytvyn (from 9 December 2008; Lytvyn Bloc)
- First Deputy: Oleksandr Lavrynovych; Adam Martyniuk (from 11 May 2010; Communist Party)
- Deputy: Mykola Tomenko (from 2 September 2008; Fatherland)
- Party control: Coalition: PR–KP–BL

Sessions
- 1st: November 2007 – January 2008
- 2nd: February 2008 – July 2008
- 3rd: September 2008 – January 2009
- 4th: February 2009 – July 2009
- 5th: August 2009 – January 2010
- 6th: February 2010 – July 2010
- 7th: August 2010 – January 2011
- 8th: February 2011 – July 2011
- 9th: September 2011 – January 2012
- 10th: February 2012 – July 2012
- 11th: September 2012 – December 2012

The Verkhovna Rada of Ukraine of the 6th convocation (Ukrainian: Верховна Рада України VI скликання, Verkhovna Rada Ukrayiny VI sklykannia) was a convocation of the legislative branch of the Verkhovna Rada, Ukraine's unicameral parliament. Its composition was based on the results of the snap parliamentary elections on 30 September 2007. The elections were held under the proportional system according to electoral lists of political parties and electoral blocks of political parties in Ukraine. The 6th convocation ended on 14 December 2012 (six weeks after the 2012 parliamentary elections).

According to the results of early elections the following political forces got in the Verkhovna Rada:

- Party of Regions with 34.37% of votes
- Yulia Tymoshenko Bloc, BYuT (Ukrainian: Блок Юлії Тимошенко, БЮТ) with 30.71%
- Our Ukraine–People's Self-Defense Bloc (Ukrainian: Блок Наша Україна–Народна Самооборона, romanized: Blok Nasha Ukrayina-Narodna Samooborona, NUNS) with 14.15%
- Communist Party of Ukraine (CPU) with 5.39%
- Lytvyn Bloc with 3.96%

Together, these political forces gathered around 88.58% of the votes. All other political parties and blocks do not pass the electoral threshold of 3%. 2,73% of electors voted "against all".

== Members ==
Full name	Elected from	Assignment time
Oleksandr Abdullin	BYuT, No. 049	
Mykola Azarov	Party of Regions, No. 006	
Iryna Akimova	Party of Regions, No. 063	
Alla Aleksandrovskaya	CPU, No. 019	
Igor Alekseev	CPU, No. 010	
Volodymyr Ariev	NUNS, No. 010	
Stanislav Arzhevitin	NUNS, No. 063	
Nurulislam Arkallayev	Party of Regions, No. 071	
Karekin Arutyunov	BYuT, No. 106	
Rinat Akhmetov	Party of Regions, No. 007	
Oleh Babayev	BYuT, No. 109	
Valeriy Babenko	BYuT, No. 144	
Aleksey Baburin	CPU, No. 013	
Mykola Bahrayev	BYuT, No. 045	
Valeriy Baranov	Lytvyn Bloc, No. 006	
Vitaliy Barvinenko	BYuT, No. 154	
Tetyana Bakhteyeva	Party of Regions, No. 023	
Valery Bevz	CPU, No. 007	
Valeriy Bevzenko	Party of Regions, No. 060	
Iryna Belousova	Lytvyn Bloc, No. 016	
Iryna Berezhna	Party of Regions, No. 151	
Oleksiy Belyi	Party of Regions, No. 033	
Oksana Bilozir	NUNS, No. 044	
Oleh Bilorus	BYuT, No. 011	
Lev Biryuk	BYuT, No. 112	
Raisa Bohatyryova	Party of Regions, No. 002	
Ruslan Bohdan	BYuT, No. 146	
Inna Bohoslovska	Party of Regions, No. 004	
Vyacheslav Bohuslayev	Party of Regions, No. 011	
Olha Bodnar	BYuT, No. 085	
Yuriy Boyko	Party of Regions, No. 049	
Oleksandr Bondar	NUNS, No. 066	
Viktor Bondarenko	Party of Regions, No. 150	
Volodymyr Bondarenko	BYuT, No. 100	
Olena Bondarenko (Party of Regions politician)	Party of Regions, No. 146	
Olena Bondarenko (All-Ukrainian Union "Fatherland" politician)	BYuT, No. 089	
Kostiantyn Bondarev	BYuT, No. 114	
Valeriy Bondik	Party of Regions, No. 130	
Valery Borisov	NUNS, No. 071	
Vsevolod Borodin	BYuT, No. 139	
Vitaliy Bort	Party of Regions, No. 168	
Oleksandr Budzherak	BYuT, No. 098	
Valeriy Bukayev	Party of Regions, No. 101	
Pavlo Burlakov	Party of Regions, No. 134	
Oleksandr Buryak	BYuT, No. 069	
Serhiy Buryak	BYuT, No. 038	
Yuriy But	NUNS, No. 061	
Svyatoslav Vakarchuk	NUNS, No. 015	
Tariel Vasadze	BYuT, No. 041	
Serhiy Vasylenko	NUNS, No. 077	
Hennadiy Vasilyev	Party of Regions, No. 017	
Oleksandr Vasilyev	Party of Regions, No. 073	
Kateryna Vashchuk	Lytvyn Bloc, No. 021	
Serhiy Velizhansky	BYuT, No. 158	
Andriy Verevsky	BYuT, No. 044	
Ivan Vernydubov	Party of Regions, No. 139	
Dmytro Vetvizky	BYuT, No. 103	
Volodymyr Vecherko	Party of Regions, No. 076	
Oleksandr Vilkul	Party of Regions, No. 059	
Yosyp Vinsky	BYuT, No. 004	
Serhiy Vlasenko	BYuT, No. 170	
Yevgeny Volynets	CPU, No. 002	
Mykhailo Volynets	BYuT, No. 015	
Oleksandr Volkov	Party of Regions, No. 042	
Yuriy Voropayev	Party of Regions, No. 074	
Ihor Vorotnyuk	BYuT, No. 033	
Volodymyr Vyazivsky	NUNS, No. 047	
Yuri Gaydayev	CPU, No. 005	
Petro Hasyuk	BYuT, No. 052	
Valeriy Hatsko	BYuT, No. 153	
Oleh Heiman	BYuT, No. 130	
Ivan Gerasimov	CPU, No. 004	
Volodymyr Herasymchuk	Lytvyn Bloc, No. 017	
Olha Herasymiuk	NUNS, No. 006	
Iryna Herashchenko	NUNS, No. 019	
Hanna Herman	Party of Regions, No. 048	
Yevhen Heller	Party of Regions, No. 077	
Serhiy Hlazunov	Party of Regions, No. 152	
Stepan Hlus	BYuT, No. 108	
Ihor Hlushchenko	Party of Regions, No. 165	
Yuriy Hnatkevych	BYuT, No. 110	
Serhiy Holovatyi	Party of Regions, No. 093	
Ihor Holovchenko	Lytvyn Bloc, No. 019	
Aleksander Golub'	CPU, No. 009	
Vasyl Horbal	Party of Regions, No. 037	
Sergey Gordienko	CPU, No. 024	
Iryna Horina	Party of Regions, No. 162	
Oleksandr Horoshkevych	Party of Regions, No. 128	
Leonid Grach	CPU	
Vadym Hryvkovsky	Lytvyn Bloc, No. 020	
Liliya Hryhorovych	NUNS, No. 012	
Yuriy Hrymchak	NUNS, No. 073	
Serhiy Hrynevetsky	Lytvyn Bloc, No. 002	
Ihor Hryniv	BYuT, No. 042	
Vasyl Hrytsak	Party of Regions, No. 099	
Anatoliy Hrytsenko	NUNS, No. 004	
Bohdan Hubskyi	BYuT, No. 027	
Ihor Humenyuk	Party of Regions, No. 051	
Oleh Humenyuk	NUNS, No. 034	
Vasyl Hureyev	Party of Regions, No. 104	
Andriy Davydenko	NUNS, No. 062	
Stepan Davimuka	BYuT, No. 135	
Vitaliy Danilov	BYuT, No. 105	
Oleksandr Darda	Party of Regions, No. 087	
Borys Deitsch	Party of Regions, No. 029	
Volodymyr Demidko	Party of Regions, No. 170	
Volodymyr Demishkan	Party of Regions, No. 119	
Mykola Demyanko	Party of Regions, No. 082	
Viktoriya Demyanchuk	CPU, No. 026	
Lyudmila Denisova	BYuT, No. 071	
Ivan Denkovych	BYuT, No. 115	
Vasyl Derevlyany	BYuT, No. 037	
Andriy Derkach	Party of Regions, No. 096	
Mykola Derkach	Lytvyn Bloc, No. 003	
Vasyl Dzharty	Party of Regions, No. 022	
Mustafa Dzhemilev	NUNS, No. 027	
Mykola Dzhyha	Party of Regions, No. 056	
Yevhen Dobryak	BYuT, No. 156	
Stanislav Dovhyi	NUNS, No. 055	
Oleksandr Doniy	NUNS, No. 037	
Volodymyr Donchak	BYuT, No. 122	
Oleksandr Dubovyi	BYuT, No. 128	
Tamara Yehorenko	Party of Regions, No. 179	since 26 February 2010 instead of Yanukovich
Oleksandr Yedin	Party of Regions, No. 120	
Ihor Yeresko	BYuT, No. 090	
Oleksandr Yefremov	Party of Regions, No. 008	
Yuriy Yekhanurov	NUNS, No. 024	
David Zhvaniya	NUNS, No. 021	
Pavlo Zhebrivskiy	NUNS, No. 067	
Kostyantyn Zhevaho	BYuT, No. 062	
Oleksiy Zhuravko	Party of Regions, No. 140	
Roman Zabzalyuk	BYuT, No. 034	
Hennadiy Zadirko	BYuT, No. 111	
Ivan Zayets	NUNS, No. 030	
Oleh Zarubynsky	Lytvyn Bloc, No. 014	
Tetyana Zasukha	Party of Regions, No. 138	
Roman Zvarych	NUNS, No. 036	
Yukhym Zvyahilsky	Party of Regions, No. 009	
Yevhen Zimin	BYuT, No. 123	
Mykola Zlochevskiy	Party of Regions, No. 110	
Ruslan Zozulya	BYuT, No. 093	
Mykhailo Zubets	Party of Regions, No. 174	
Volodymyr Zubik	Party of Regions, No. 098	
Valentyn Zubov	BYuT, No. 019	
Volodymyr Ivanenko	BYuT, No. 142	
Yuriy Ivanyushchenko	Party of Regions, No. 111	
Hryhoriy Ilyashov	Party of Regions, No. 148	
Igor Kaletnik	CPU, No. 016	
Valeriy Kalchenko	BYuT, No. 028	
Vitaliy Kalyuzhny	Party of Regions, No. 171	
Valeriy Kamchatny	BYuT, No. 099	
Volodymyr Kaplienko	BYuT, No. 148	
Yuriy Karakai	Party of Regions, No. 167	
Yuriy Karmazin	NUNS, No. 058	
Volodymyr Karpuk	NUNS, No. 064	
Vladyslav Kaskiv	NUNS, No. 031	
Mykola Katerynchuk	NUNS, No. 005	
Oleksandr Kemenyash	BYuT, No. 067	
Serhiy Kiy	Party of Regions, No. 069	
Vyacheslav Kyrylenko	NUNS, No. 002	
Ivan Kyrylenko	BYuT, No. 070	
Yevhen Kyrylchuk	BYuT, No. 020	
Vasyl Kiselyov	Party of Regions, No. 035	
Serhiy Kivalov	Party of Regions, No. 028	
Spiridon Kilinkarov	CPU, No. 015	
Anatoliy Kinakh	Party of Regions, No. 053	
Oleksandr Klymenko	NUNS, No. 050	
Pavlo Klymets	Party of Regions, No. 088	
Leonid Klimov	Party of Regions, No. 038	
Andriy Klyuev	Party of Regions, No. 014	
Serhiy Klyuyev	Party of Regions, No. 062	
Yuriy Klyuchkovsky	NUNS, No. 020	
Ruslan Knyazevich	NUNS, No. 009	
Vyacheslav Koval	NUNS, No. 038	
Yulia Kovaleva	Party of Regions, No. 133	
Mykola Kovzel	BYuT, No. 053	
Leonid Kozhara	Party of Regions, No. 163	
Andriy Kozhemiakin	BYuT, No. 023	
Volodymyr Kozak	Party of Regions, No. 094	
Borys Kolesnikov	Party of Regions, No. 010	
Vadym Kolesnichenko	Party of Regions, No. 175	
Dmytro Kolesnikov	Party of Regions, No. 147	
Yuriy Kolotsey	Party of Regions, No. 052	
Mykola Komar	Party of Regions, No. 137	
Olena Kondratyuk	BYuT, No. 134	
Valeriy Konovalyuk	Party of Regions, No. 084	
Yevhen Konstantinov	BYuT, No. 124	
Viktor Korzh	Party of Regions, No. 172	
Vitaliy Korzh	BYuT, No. 048	
Pavlo Korzh	Party of Regions, No. 061	
Anatoliy Korzhev	Party of Regions, No. 070	
Yevhen Korniychuk	BYuT, No. 010	
Natalia Korolevska	BYuT, No. 066	
Vadym Korotyuk	BYuT, No. 155	
Mykhailo Kosiv	BYuT, No. 126	
Pavlo Kostenko	BYuT, No. 072	
Yuriy Kostenko	NUNS, No. 016	
Oleksiy Kostusyev	Party of Regions, No. 030	
Andriy Kravets	Party of Regions, No. 124	
Nikolay Kravchenko	CPU, No. 022	
Petro Kravchuk	BYuT, No. 068	
Valeriy Krayniy	BYuT, No. 138	
Ihor Kril	NUNS, No. 040	
Mykola Kruhlov	Party of Regions, No. 039	
Yuriy Kruk	BYuT, No. 077	
Petro Krupko	BYuT, No. 118	
Petro Kuzmenko	BYuT, No. 097	
Oleksandr Kuzmuk	Party of Regions, No. 041	
Vasyl Kuybida	NUNS, No. 026	
Kirill Kulikov	NUNS, No. 057	
Mykola Kulchinsky	NUNS, No. 072	
Vitaliy Kurylo	BYuT, No. 008	
Ivan Kurovsky	BYuT, No. 065	
Stepan Kurpil	BYuT, No. 036	
Oleksiy Kucherenko	NUNS, No. 052	
Anzhelika Labunska	BYuT, No. 088	
Oleksandr Lavrynovych	Party of Regions, No. 067	
Valentyn Landik	Party of Regions, No. 018	
Volodymyr Landik	Party of Regions, No. 126	
Serhiy Larin	Party of Regions, No. 065	
Pavlo Lebedyev	Party of Regions, No. 121	
Volodymyr Levtsun	BYuT, No. 032	
Oleksiy Lelyuk	Party of Regions, No. 092	
Oleksandr Leshchinskiy	Party of Regions, No. 054	
Ihor Lisov	Party of Regions, No. 156	
Volodymyr Lytvyn	Lytvyn Bloc, No. 001	
Yuriy Lytvyn	Lytvyn Bloc, No. 015	
Leonid Litvinov	Party of Regions, No. 016	
Mykhailo Livinsky	BYuT, No. 143	
Mykola Lisin	Party of Regions, No. 108	
Oleksiy Lohvynenko	BYuT, No. 059	
Viktor Lozynsky	BYuT, No. 096	up to 3 July 2009
Olena Lukash	Party of Regions, No. 027	
Oleh Lukashuk	BYuT, No. 101	
Vladyslav Lukyanov	Party of Regions, No. 155	
Kateryna Lukyanova	NUNS, No. 049	
Ruslan Lukyanchuk	BYuT, No. 056	
Yuriy Lutsenko	NUNS, No. 001	
Serhiy Lyovochkin	Party of Regions, No. 046	
Kseniya Lyapina	NUNS, No. 008	
Oleh Liashko	BYuT, No. 029	
Volodymyr Makeyenko	Party of Regions, No. 047	
Volodymyr Makeyenko	BYuT, No. 076	
Volodymyr Malyshev	Party of Regions, No. 064	
Oleh Malich	BYuT, No. 120	
Volodymyr Maltsev	Party of Regions, No. 066	
Hryhoriy Mankovsky	Party of Regions, No. 169	
Yevgeny Marmazov	CPU	
Mykola Martynenko	NUNS, No. 048	
Adam Martynyuk	CPU, No. 006	
Volodymyr Marushchenko	NUNS, No. 065	
Valentin Matveev	CPU, No. 012	
Vladimir Matveev	CPU, No. 027	
Anatoliy Matviyenko	NUNS, No. 022	
Eduard Matviychuk	Party of Regions, No. 131	
Stanislav Melnyk	Party of Regions, No. 080	
Ivan Myrny	Party of Regions, No. 102	
Mykhailo Myronenko	Party of Regions, No. 144	
Yuriy Miroshnychenko	Party of Regions, No. 143	
Serhiy Mishchenko	BYuT, No. 057	
Pavlo Movchan	BYuT, No. 131	
Volodymyr Moisyk	NUNS, No. 043	
Serhiy Momot	Party of Regions, No. 057	
Yuriy Moroko	Party of Regions, No. 153	
Hennadiy Moskal	NUNS, No. 041	
Ulyana Mostipan	BYuT, No. 030	
Serhiy Moshak	Party of Regions, No. 123	
Nver Mkhitaryan	Party of Regions, No. 095	
Andrey Naydenov	CPU, No. 023	
Volodymyr Nakonechny	Party of Regions, No. 158	
Hryhoriy Nemyria	BYuT, No. 046	
Oleh Novikov	NUNS, No. 045	
Yuliya Novikova	Party of Regions, No. 105	
Yuriy Odarchenko	BYuT, No. 031	
Viktor Oliynyk	BYuT, No. 151	
Svyatoslav Oliynyk	BYuT, No. 086	
Hryhoriy Omelchenko	BYuT, No. 007	
Oleksandr Omelchenko	NUNS, No. 013	
Mykola Onishchuk	NUNS, No. 014	
Andriy Orlov	Party of Regions, No. 117	
Olesya Orobets	NUNS, No. 018	
Serhiy Osyka	BYuT, No. 051	
Eduard Pavlenko	Party of Regions, No. 050	
Serhiy Pavlenko	Lytvyn Bloc, No. 013	
Yuriy Pavlenko	NUNS, No. 007	
Ihor Palytsia	NUNS, No. 068	
Mykhailo Papiyev	Party of Regions, No. 075	
Andriy Parubiy	NUNS, No. 80	
Serhiy Pashynsky	BYuT, No. 073	
Oleksandr Peklushenko	Party of Regions, No. 044	
Marina Perestenko	CPU, No. 003	
Vadym Petrenko	BYuT, No. 040	
Borys Petrov	Party of Regions, No. 036	
Mykola Petruk	BYuT, No. 009	
Vasyl Petiovka	NUNS, No. 060	
Vyacheslav Perederiy	BYuT, No. 102	
Volodymyr Pylypenko	BYuT, No. 169	up to September, 2008
Viktor Pylypyshyn	Lytvyn Bloc, No. 005	
Viktor Pynzenyk	BYuT, No. 006	
Valeriy Pysarenko	BYuT, No. 074	
Petro Pysarchuk	Party of Regions, No. 154	
Svyatoslav Piskun	Party of Regions, No. 031	
Oleskiy Plotnikov	Party of Regions, No. 136	
Ihor Plokhoy	Party of Regions, No. 109	
Ivan Plyushch	NUNS, No. 023	
Serhiy Podhorny	BYuT, No. 132	
Mykhailo Pozhyvanov	BYuT, No. 117	
Volodymyr Polokhalo	BYuT, No. 050	
Yuriy Poluneyev	BYuT, No. 091	
Mykhailo Polyanchych	NUNS, No. 035	
Volodymyr Polyachenko	NUNS, No. 032	
Oleksandr Ponomarenko	BYuT, No. 145	
Ivan Popesku	Party of Regions, No. 173	
Oleksandr Popov	Party of Regions, No. 097	
Andriy Portnov	BYuT, No. 058	
Vasyl Potapov	Party of Regions, No. 116	
Ihor Prasolov	Party of Regions, No. 043	
Anton Pryhodsky	Party of Regions, No. 021	
Mykola Prysyazhnyuk	Party of Regions, No. 113	
Dmytro Prytyka	Party of Regions, No. 125	
Yuriy Prokopchuk	BYuT, No. 141	
Eduard Prutnyk	Party of Regions, No. 055	
Borys Pudov	BYuT, No. 116	
Artem Pshonka	Party of Regions, No. 149	
Oleh Radkovsky	BYuT, No. 104	
Arnold Radovets	BYuT, No. 107	
Dmytro Reva	Party of Regions, No. 106	
Volodymyr Rybak	Party of Regions, No. 013	
Ihor Rybakov	BYuT, No. 078	
Serhiy Ryzhuk	Party of Regions, No. 176	
Mykola Rudchenko	Lytvyn Bloc, No. 007	
Oleksandr Riabeka	BYuT, No. 127	
Ihor Savchenko	BYuT, No. 137	
Oleksandr Savchuk	Party of Regions, No. 032	
Dmytro Salamatin	Party of Regions, No. 086	
Yuriy Samoylenko	Party of Regions, No. 058	
Yekaterina Samoylik	CPU, No. 017	
Dmytro Sandler	Party of Regions, No. 079	
Serhiy Sas	BYuT, No. 017	
Ravil Safiullin	Party of Regions, No. 040	
Dmytro Svyatash	Party of Regions, No. 122	
Andriy Selivarov	Party of Regions, No. 127	
Ostap Semerak	BYuT, No. 140	
Anatoliy Semynoha	BYuT, No. 016	
Andriy Senchenko	BYuT, No. 064	
Yuriy Serbin	BYuT, No. 081	
Mykola Sivulsky	BYuT, No. 063	
Petro Symonenko	CPU, No. 001	
Artem Synytsia	Party of Regions, No. 160	
Mykhailo Syrota	Lytvyn Bloc, No. 010	
Volodymyr Sivkovych	Party of Regions, No. 078	
Yevhen Sihal	BYuT, No. 047	
Ivan Sydelnyk	BYuT, No. 054	
Oleksandr Skybinetskiy	BYuT, No. 061	
Stanislav Skubashevsky	Party of Regions, No. 118	
Volodymyr Skubenko	BYuT, No. 121	
Heorhiy Skudar	Party of Regions, No. 012	
Viktor Slauta	Party of Regions, No. 089	
Oleksandr Slobodyan	NUNS, No. 042	
Hryhoriy Smityukh	Party of Regions, No. 115	
Serhiy Sobolev	BYuT, No. 025	
Mykhailo Sokolov	BYuT, No. 129	
Mykola Soloshenko	Party of Regions, No. 112	
Raisa Sorochynska-Kyrylenko	BYuT, No. 149	
Ivan Spodarenko	NUNS, No. 017	
Yuriy Stets	NUNS, No. 053	
Taras Stetskiv	NUNS, No. 029	
Ivan Stoyko	NUNS, No. 046	
Oleksandr Stoyan	Party of Regions, No. 024	
Volodymyr Stretovich	NUNS, No. 025	
Pavlo Sulkovsky	Party of Regions, No. 129	
Oleksandr Suprunenko	BYuT, No. 013	
Yaroslav Sukhoy	Party of Regions, No. 068	
Valeriy Sushkevich	BYuT, No. 039	
Dmytro Tabachnyk	Party of Regions, No. 034	
Yan Tabachnyk	Party of Regions, No. 020	
Viktor Taran	BYuT, No. 018	
Borys Tarasyuk	NUNS, No. 011	
Elbrus Tedeyev	Party of Regions, No. 132	
Serhiy Tereshchuk	Lytvyn Bloc, No. 011	
Serhiy Terekhin	BYuT, No. 024	
Nikolay Timoshenko	CPU, No. 025	
Yulia Tymoshenko	BYuT, No. 001	
Viktor Tykhonov	Party of Regions, No. 019	
Serhiy Titenko	Party of Regions, No. 159	
Roman Tkach	NUNS, No. 054	
Oleksandr Tkachenko (politician)	CPU, No. 008	
Anatoliy Tolstoukhov	Party of Regions, No. 083	
Mykola Tomenko	BYuT, No. 003	
Viktor Topolov	NUNS, No. 056	
Mykola Trayduk	BYuT, No. 152	
Yuriy Trehubov	BYuT, No. 136	
Oleksandr Tretyakov	NUNS, No. 059	
Yuriy Tryndyuk	BYuT, No. 084	
Vadym Trofymenko	BYuT, No. 157	
Serhiy Tulub	Party of Regions, No. 081	
Viktor Turmanov	Party of Regions, No. 026	
Oleksandr Turchynov	BYuT, No. 02	up to 19 December 2007
Viktor Ukolov	BYuT, No. 147	
Yaroslav Fedorchuk	BYuT, No. 012	
Oleksandr Feldman	BYuT, No. 43	
Leonid Fesenko	Party of Regions, No. 161	
Volodymyr Filenko	BYuT, No. 060	
Heorhiy Filypchuk	BYuT, No. 150	
Vasyl Khara	Party of Regions, No. 025	
Valeriy Kharlim	Party of Regions, No. 107	
Serhiy Kharovsky	NUNS, No. 069	
Vasyl Khmelnytsky	Party of Regions, No. 100	
Vitaliy Khomutynnik	Party of Regions, No. 091	
Sergey Khrapov	CPU, No. 011	
Oleh Tsaryov	Party of Regions, No. 114	
Petr Tsybenko	CPU, No. 018	
Vitaliy Chepinoha	BYuT, No. 087	
Ihor Cherkassky	BYuT, No. 125	
Oleksandr Chernomorov	Party of Regions, No. 166	
Oleh Cherpitsky	BYuT, No. 133	
Yuriy Chertkov	Party of Regions, No. 085	
Mykhailo Chechetov	Party of Regions, No. 135	
Taras Chornovil	Party of Regions, No. 003	
Oleksandr Chornovolenko	NUNS, No. 070	
Vitaliy Chudnovsky	BYuT, No. 083	
Yevhen Shaho	BYuT, No. 080	
Valeriy Shamanov	BYuT, No. 092	
Ihor Sharov	Lytvyn Bloc, No. 012	
Viktor Shvets	BYuT, No. 026	
Andrey Shevchenko	BYuT, No. 005	
Oleh Shevchuk	BYuT, No. 095	
Serhiy Shevchuk	BYuT, No. 021	
Viktor Shemchuk	NUNS, No. 033	
Dmytro Shentsev	Party of Regions, No. 141	
Oleksandr Shepelev	BYuT, No. 055	
Mykola Shershun	Lytvyn Bloc, No. 009	
Elina Shishkina	BYuT, No. 075	
Zoya Shishkina	BYuT, No. 082	
Andriy Shkil	BYuT, No. 014	
Ihor Shkirya	Party of Regions, No. 157	
Zinoviy Shkutyak	NUNS, No. 051	
Dmytro Shlemko	BYuT, No. 035	
Svetlana Shmeleva	CPU, No. 020	
Mykola Shmidt	Lytvyn Bloc, No. 018	
Vasyl Shpak	Lytvyn Bloc, No. 008	
Dmytro Shpenov	Party of Regions, No. 142	
Olena Shustik	BYuT, No. 094	
Nestor Shufrych	Party of Regions, No. 005	
Artem Shcherban	Party of Regions, No. 164	
Petro Yushchenko	NUNS, No. 039	
Volodymyr Yavorivsky	BYuT, No. 22	
Mykola Yankovsky	Party of Regions, No. 015	
Viktor Yanukovich	Party of Regions, No. 090	
Viktor Yanukovych	Party of Regions, No. 001	up to 19 February 2010
Volodymyr Yaroshchuk	Party of Regions, No. 072	
Anton Yatsenko	BYuT, No. 079	
Arseniy Yatsenyuk	NUNS, No. 003	
Volodymyr Yatsuba	Party of Regions, No. 103	

== See also ==
- 2007 Ukrainian parliamentary election
