= Olena Bondarenko =

Olena or Yelena Bondarenko may refer to:

- Olena Bondarenko (politician, born 1974) (Olena Anatoliivna Bondarenko), Ukrainian Party of Regions politician
- Olena Bondarenko (politician, born 1955) (Olena Fedorivna Bondarenko), Ukrainian Batkivshchyna politician
- Yelena Bondarenko (Russian politician) (Yelena Veniaminovna Bondarenko, born 1968)

== See also ==
- Alona Bondarenko, (born 1984), Ukrainian tennis player
