= Oleksiy Azarov =

Austrian businessman (born 1971)

- Олексій Азаров
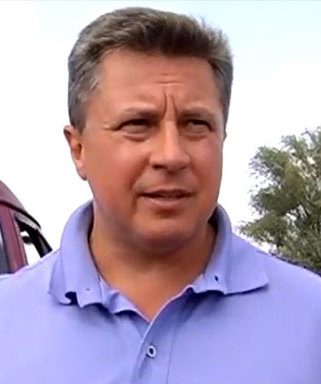

Member of the Verkhovna Rada
- In office 12 December 2012 – 27 November 2014

Personal details
- Born: Oleksiy Mykolayovych Azarov; 13 July 1971 (age 54) Kaluga, Russian SFSR, Soviet Union (now Russia)
- Citizenship: Austria (since 2014)
- Party: Party of Regions
- Spouse: Lilya Eduardivna Azarova

Oleksiy Mykolayovych Azarov (Ukrainian: Олексій Миколайович Азаров; born on 13 July 1971), is a Russian-born Austrian and former Ukrainian businessman and former politician. He was the First Deputy Chairman of the Verkhovna Rada Committee on Finance and Banking, People's Deputy of Ukraine, and a member of the Party of Regions faction in the Verkhovna Rada of the VII convocation.

He is hiding from the investigation together with his father.

== Biography ==
Oleksiy Azarov was born on 13 July 1971 in the city of Kaluga to his father, Mykola Azarov, and his wife Lyudmyla Mykolaivna. He is married and has three children.

Between 1992 and 1993, he graduated from Moscow State University with a degree in mining engineering.

From 1993 to 1995, he worked as a chief engineer, and then as a deputy director of the Coordination Council of heads of enterprises and organizations in Donetsk.

From 1996 to 1997, he headed the Donetsk department of the State Securities Commission.

Between 1998 and 2001, he worked in the embassies of Ukraine in Finland and Switzerland, and the mission of Ukraine to the United Nations.

In 2000, he graduated from the Ukrainian Academy of Foreign Trade and received a law degree in international law.

In 2001, he successfully defended his scientific dissertation on the topic "Peculiarities of Ukraine's accession to the WTO.

Between 2000 and 2002, he was an employee of the Ukrainian Trade Representation in Switzerland.

From 2002 to 2003, Azarov was an adviser to the then Prime Minister Viktor Yanukovych ("on a voluntary basis")

From 2007 to 2012, he served as Director-Representative of the International Investment Promotion Fund - Sustainable Ukraine gemeinnützige Forschung GmbH in Vienna.

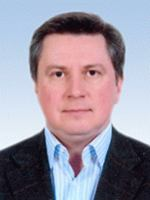
Azarov as a member of the Verkhovna Rada

In the 2012 parliamentary elections, Azarov was nominated as a candidate for the Verkhovna Rada from the Party of Regions in the single-mandate majority constituency No. 47. According to the election commission, he won, gaining 76.10% of the vote.

=== International connections ===
In the Verkhovna Rada of the seventh convocation, Azarov heads the group for inter-parliamentary relations with Austria, as he is the deputy head of the group for inter-parliamentary relations with Spain and is a member of the Verkhovna Rada groups for inter-parliamentary relations with countries such as Japan, Lithuania, Switzerland, Germany, Bulgaria, Italy, Saudi Arabia, France, the United States, Finland, United Arab Emirates, and Iraq. As part of inter-parliamentary activities, Azarov regularly meets with diplomatic representatives of various countries and international organizations.

=== Criminal proceedings ===
On 5 March 2014, the European Council approved the blocking of funds of the ousted Verkhovna Rada from the post of President of Ukraine, Yanukovych, his sons Oleksandr Yanukovych and Yanukovych, ex-Prime Minister Mykola Azarov, Oleksiy, with brothers Andriy and Serhiy Klyuyev, ex-Prosecutor General Viktor Pshonka and his son Artem, businessman Serhiy Kurchenko - a total of 17 people from among former government officials and close to ex-president Yanukovych, who are suspected of illegal use of budget funds.

Since April 2014, Oleksiy and his father, with the help of European lawyers, have been trying to challenge the application of sanctions against them in order to unfreeze blocked EU accounts and lift visa restrictions.

In early September 2014, the Austrian Ministry of the Interior froze the assets of LPG Trading GmbH, which traded in liquefied natural gas, owned jointly Kurchenko and Azarov, on suspicion of money laundering based on a decision of the EU Council on sanctions against the Yanukovych clan. The investigation into this company has been underway since March 2014.

== Personal life ==
=== Property ===
The Ukrainian airline Air Onix is associated with Oleksiy's name.

He was the founder, owner of 100% of the capital (€35,000) and officially, until 2012, the manager of the Austrian company "Sustainable Ukraine gemeinnützige Forschung GmbH"

He was the owner of the offshore holding "P&A Corporate Cervice Trust" in Vaduz, Liechtenstein.

He was the owner of the offshore holding “L. A. D. A. Holding Anstalt " in Vaduz.

He is the owner of an account with UniCredit Bank in Vienna.

==== Real estate ====
He owns a house with a plot in the elite district of Vienna Pötzleinsdorf, adjacent to the palace park, where his family lives and where Mykola moved immediately after his resignation from the post of Prime Minister of Ukraine in late January 2014. Area: residential 1013 m2, estate 3373 м². The price of housing in this residential area is in the range of €4000— €6100 per 1 m^{2}

The office center (1st and basement floors), area 1500 m2

==== Automobile ====
He had a Chrysler 300 C car, which is registered to an employee of his company, but which is constantly driven by him.

==== Apartment ====
He has a permanent residence permit in Austria, registered in Kiev.

=== Hobbies ===
His favorite hobbies is sports. He is fluent in English.

=== Family ===
He is married and has three children.

His wife, Lilya Eduardivna Azarova, (née Fathulina, born in 1976), is an Austrian entrepreneur and publisher (presented as a “housewife” in O. Azarov's declaration of 30.07.2012). She is the manager and owner of 50% of the capital (€50,000) of the Publishind Deuxe Holding GmbH; owner of Vienna Deluxe Magazine; owner of an art gallery in Vienna's elite Parkring quarter.

Their children are, Dariy, Alyona, and Nikolay.
