= Biryuk (disambiguation) =

Biryuk is an East Slavic surname.

Biryuk may also refer to:

- Biryuk (river), a tributary of the Lena
- Biryuk (rural locality), a rural locality (a selo) in Olyokminsky District of the Sakha Republic, Russia
- Biryuk, Russian title of Lone Wolf, a 1977 Soviet drama movie
