= Volodymyr Ivanenko =

Volodymyr Ivanenko may refer to:

- Volodymyr Ivanenko (television executive)
- Volodymyr Ivanenko (politician)
