= Biryuk =

Biryuk, sometimes transliterated as Biriuk is an East Slavic surname derived from a nickname literally meaning "lone wolf".

- Galina Biryuk, student of Nikolay Bogolyubov, Soviet mathematician and physicist
- Iryna Biryuk, Ukrainian basketball player, member of the Ukraine women's national basketball team
- Lev Biryuk (b. 1946), Ukrainian politician
- Lyubov Biryuk, Andrei Chikatilo's murder victim
- Natalia Biryuk, Ukrainian featherweight boxer participating in the 2011 Women's European Amateur Boxing Championships
- Olena Biryuk (1932–2021), Soviet-Ukrainian rhythmic gymnast and coach
- Tamara Biryuk, Ukrainian high jumper participating in the 2012 World Junior Championships in Athletics – Women's high jump
