= Viktor Bondarenko =

Viktor Bondarenko may refer to:

- Viktor Bondarenko (footballer) (born 1949), Russian football coach and former player
- Viktor Bondarenko (politician) (born 1967), Ukrainian politician
- Viktor Bondarenko (coach), Ukrainian trainer and father of high jumper Bohdan Bondarenko
