= Iryna Akimova =

Ukrainian politician

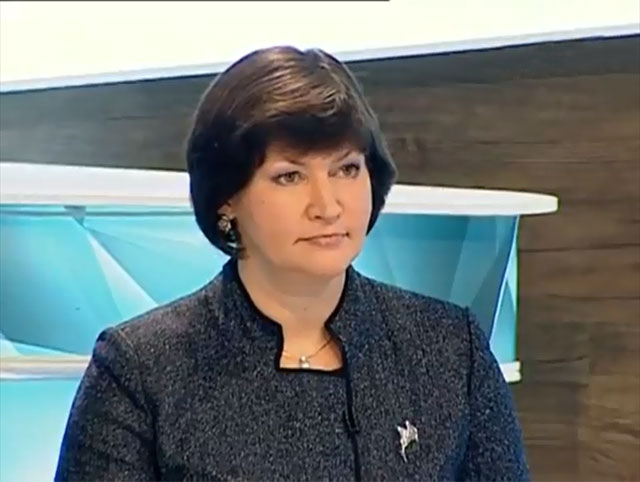
Akimova in 2013

Iryna Mykhailivna Akimova (Ukrainian: Ірина Михайлівна Акімова; born 26 April 1960) is a Ukrainian politician and former First Deputy Head of Presidential Administration of Ukraine. She held this post from February 2010 till February 2014.

== Biography ==
Akimova was born in Kharkiv on 26 April 1960. In 1982, she graduated from the Economics Faculty of the Kharkiv State University. She was the holder of Alexander von Humboldt Foundation, Volkswagen Stiftung, DAAD, and ACCEL fellowships.

After April 2014, she moved away from politics and has been engaged in painting in Kyiv. In January 2022, she opened an exhibition showing her paintings.

== Work and scientific activities ==
In the middle of the 1980s, Akimova passed her Ph.D. defense.

=== Positions and places of work ===
- Senior advisor to Victor Yanukovych
- Director of the Institute for Economic Research and Policy Consulting in Kyiv
- Senior research fellow at the Center for Economic Research at Warsaw University
- Research assistant at the Economics department of the University of Magdeburg
- Director of the analytical center "Blakitna strichka" Ltd. (Blue Ribbon)
- Assistant Professor of Management Department at Kharkiv Polytechnic Institute
- Director General of the analytical center "Bureau of Economic and Social Technologies" (Kyiv)

== Political career ==
From October 2007, Akimova was a member of the Party of Regions. In November 2007 she was elected the Member of Parliament – No. 63 on the list. Akimova then worked as Deputy Head of the Committee in Verkhovna Rada on economic policy issues and took the position of Economy Minister in the opposition government of Viktor Yanukovych. Akimova remained a frequent guest at political talk shows and is the public figure in the Party of Regions.

On February 25, 2010, Akimova was appointed the First Deputy Head of Presidential Administration. On March 16, 2010, she was appointed the Representative of the President of Ukraine in the Cabinet of Ministers of Ukraine.

After Andriy Klyuyev had left the post in mid-February 2012 Akimova was tipped as the new First Vice Prime Minister of Ukraine. But Valeriy Khoroshkovskyi was appointed instead.

In October 2012 Akimova was re-elected to the Ukrainian parliament on the party list of the Party of Regions, but she turned down this mandate.

In late January 2014, by decrees of President Yanukovych, Akimova was dismissed from the post of first deputy head of the Presidential Administration and appointed advisor to the President. In February 2014 Yanukovych was ousted from power. In an April 2014 interview, she stated that she was no longer a member of the Party of Regions.

== See also ==
- List of Ukrainian Parliament Members 2007
- 2007 Ukrainian parliamentary election
