= Valery Bondik =

Ukrainian politician and jurist

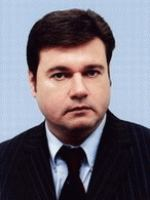
Valery Bondik in 2007

Valery Bondyk is a People's Deputy of Ukraine, member of Party of Regions fraction (since November 2007), Chairman of the Committee on the Judiciary (since December 2007), member of the High Council of Justice (since March 2007).

== Biography ==
Valery Bondyk was born on 1 April 1964 in Dobropillia, Donetsk Oblast, his father was a miner.
In 1985 Valery Bondik graduated from Donetsk Higher Military-Political School of Engineering and Signal Corps.
In 1996 he graduated the National Law Academy of Ukraine named after Yaroslav the Wise, majoring in case law
In 2010 Valery Bondyk defended his Ph.D. thesis in Odesa Law Academy and hold the degree of Candidate of legal sciences.

=== Career ===
- 1985-1986 - Deputy company commander for political affairs, the military unit in Turkmenistan
- 1986-1990 - Deputy company commander for political affairs, military unit in Hungary
- 1990-1991 - work in ideological department of Donetsk city committee of the Communist Party of Ukraine
- 1991-1992 - legal advisor at Donetsk railway management; legal advisor, Donetsk broker firm "Variant"
- 1992-1994 - lawyer, Executive Director, deputy Director General of the law firm "INYUR"(Donetsk)
- 1994-1995 - lawyer at the Kalinin district office of State Tax Inspectorate (Donetsk)
- 1995-1996 - trainee prosecutor of the Donetsk Oblast' Prosecutor's Office, at that time he passed the qualifying exam for lawyers' testimony
- 1996-1998 - Head of the legal department of Donetsk Chocolate Factory "AVK"
- 1998-2004 - lawyer, arbitration manager, Head of the scientific and methodological center for crisis management(Donetsk). Since 1999 - part-time lecturer at Donetsk State Academy of Management.
- January 2004 to December 2004 - Member of the Central Election Commission (under the leadership of Serhii Kivalov )
- 2004-2006 - assistant to the People's Deputy of Ukraine
- 2006-2007 - People's Deputy of Ukraine from the Party of Regions in the 5th Verkhovna Rada (No. 101 in the electoral list), Chairman of the subcommittee of the Judiciary Committee
- since February 2007 to November 2007 - First Deputy Minister of Justice of Ukraine (Oleksandr Lavrynovych)

At the parliamentary elections in 2007 Valery Bondyk went to Parliament again from the Party of Regions (No. 130 in the list). In Verkhovna Rada he takes the position of Deputy Chairman of the Justice Committee

=== Social activities ===
Valery Bondyk has been the member of Donetsk Oblast' council(since 1998 to 2004), member of the qualification commission of judges in Donetsk oblast' (since 1998 to 2004), member of the Supreme Council of Justice (since March 2007).

=== Family ===
Valery Bondyk is married, his wife Irina (born 1969) is a dentist. They have one daughter, Alexandra (born 1990).

== Awards ==
Medals:

- 1987: "70 years of USSR Armed Forces"
- 2006: "15 years in the Armed Forces of Ukraine"
- 2007: "15 years of military intelligence of Ukraine"

In 2009 he hold the title "Honored Lawyer of Ukraine" by Presidential Decree, for personal contribution to the law development, professionalism in protecting constitutional rights and freedoms. In 2010 Valery Bondyk was awarded as "Lawyer of the Year" within the national program "Man of the Year 2010".

== See also ==
- 2007 Ukrainian parliamentary election
- List of Ukrainian Parliament Members 2007
- Party of Regions
