= Yuriy Chertkov =

Ukrainian politician

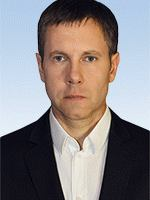
- Born: May 16, 1962 (age 64)
- Education: Donetsk National University
- Occupations: politician, MP of Ukraine
- Political party: Party of Regions
- Awards: Honorary Diploma of the Cabinet of Ministers of Ukraine; Honored Economist of Ukraine; Order of Merit

Yuri Dmytrovych Chertkov (Ukrainian: Юрій Дмитрович Чертков, Russian: Юрий Дмитриевич Чертков) is a Ukrainian politician and businessman. He was the people's deputy of the Verkhovna Rada of Ukraine V (2006-2007), VI (2007-2012), and VII (2012-2014) convocations. Member of the Committee on Foreign Affairs (since 12.2007).

== Biography ==
Yuri Chertkov was born on May 16, 1962 in Donetsk, Ukrainian SSR.

From 1981 – 1983 he served in the armed forces in the group of troops of the USSR in Germany.

1981 – graduated from Enakievo Metallurgical College, specialty: mechanical engineer.

2002 – graduated from Donetsk National University, specialty: economist.

=== Business ===
From 1983 – 1985, a student of an underground miner, then an underground miner at the Chelyuskintsev mine.

From 1985 – 1986, a master adjuster at the Donetsk Cotton and Paper Mill.

From 1987 – 1988, foreman of the section of machine tools with numerical control at the Petrovsky Mechanical Repair Plant.

From 1997 – 2006, the owner of a private entreprice "Petrovskoe."

Since 2004 – the owner of the equestrian complex Donbass Equicentre.

Since 2009 – the owner of the series of five-star international jumping tournaments Donbass Tour CSI5*.

2013 – 2016, President of the Equestrian Federation of Ukraine.

==== As a president of the Equestrian Federation of Ukraine ====
In 2014, the Ukrainian children's national team took part in the European Show Jumping Championships in Arezzo, Italy. In the same year, there, in Arezzo, Ukrainian riders took part in the youth and junior competitions .

Also in 2014, the Ukrainian team took part in the World Equestrian Games in Normandy.

In August 2015, the Ukrainian team took part in the European Show Jumping Championships in Aachen. And already in September, the Ukrainian show jumping team qualified for the Olympics in Rio, where they competed as Olympians in August 2016.

=== Political career ===
From 2006 – 2007 he was the People's Deputy of Ukraine of the 5th convocation from the Party of Regions of Ukraine faction, Member of the Committee on Foreign Affairs.

From 2007 – 2012 Chertkov was the People's Deputy of Ukraine of the VI convocation from the Party of Regions, Member of the Committee on Foreign Affairs.

From December 2012 to November 2014 - People's Deputy of Ukraine of the VII convocation from the Party of Regions, Member of the Committee on Foreign Affairs.

== Awards ==
On May 16, 2012, he was awarded the Order of Merit, III degree.

== Private life ==
He is unmarried and has two daughters.

== See also ==
- 2007 Ukrainian parliamentary election
- List of Ukrainian Parliament Members 2007
