= Vitaly Barvinenko =

Ukrainian politician (born 1981)

Vitaliy Dmytrovych Barvinenko
- Віталій Дмитрович Барвіненко
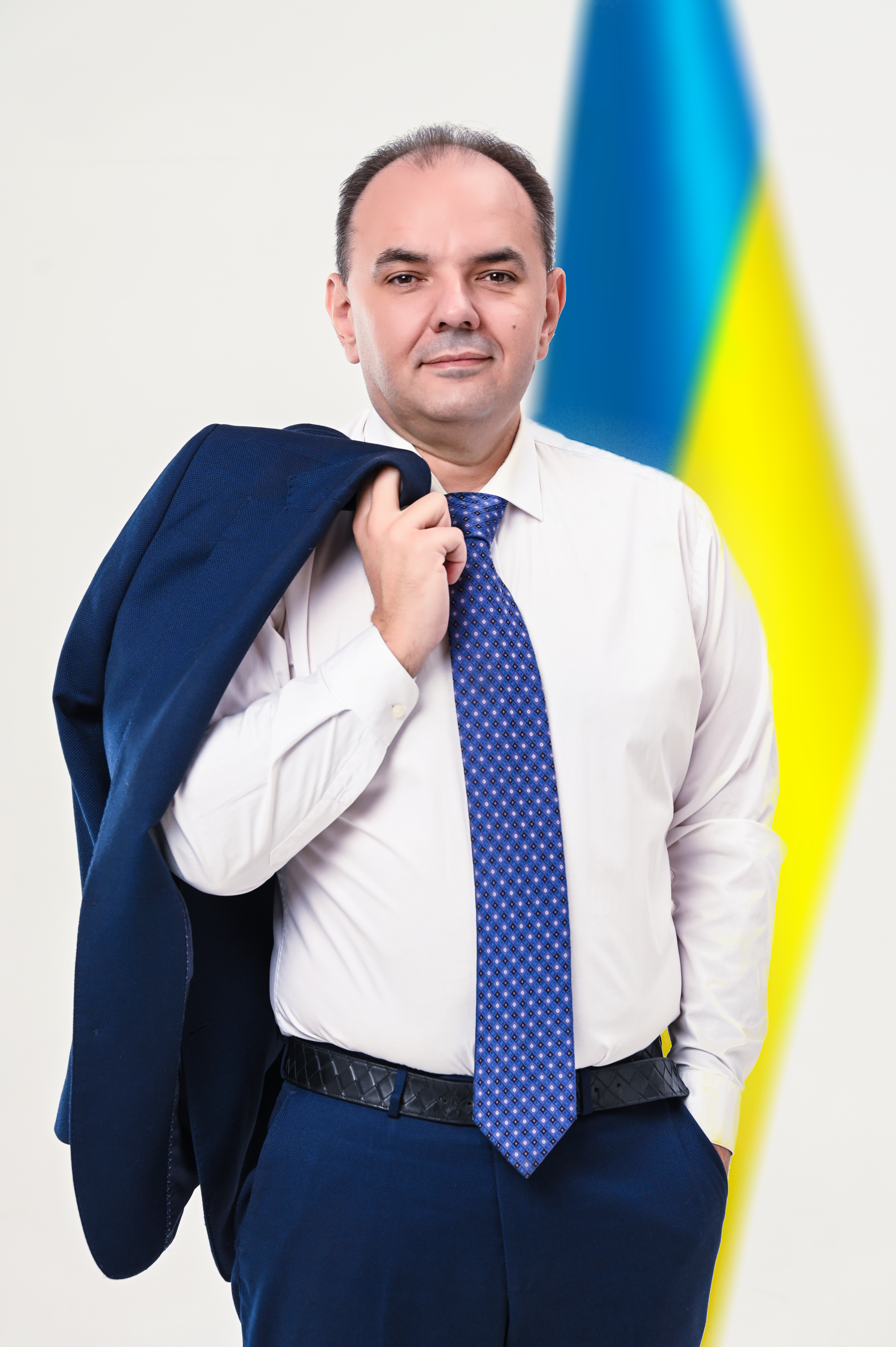

People's Deputy of Ukraine
- In office 2007–2019

Head of Odesa District Council
- Incumbent
- Assumed office December 15, 2020

Personal details
- Born: June 3, 1981 (age 44) Bilhorod-Dnistrovskyi, Odesa Oblast, Ukrainian SSR, Soviet Union (now Ukraine)
- Party: Revival (2014–present)
- Other political affiliations: Yulia Tymoshenko Bloc (2006–2010); Party of Regions (2011–2014); Independent (2014)
- Education: Odesa National Economics University, National Academy for Public Administration, Academy of Municipal Management
- Occupation: Politician, Legal Scholar
- Awards: Order of Merit (3rd Class)

Vitaliy Dmytrovych Barvinenko (born June 3, 1981) is a Ukrainian politician and People's Deputy of Ukraine, the first head of the Odesa District Council. He served as a Member of Parliament across the VI to VIII convocations. Vitaly holds a Doctorate in Law.

== Biography ==
=== Early life and education ===
Vitaliy Barvinenko was born on June 3, 1981, in Bilhorod-Dnistrovskyi, Odesa oblast. In 2003, he graduated from Odesa National University named after Mechnikov, International Economics department.

Later, he continued his education in Administrative Management at the Academy of Municipal Management (2013–2014). He earned a Master's in Public Administration with honors from the National Academy of Public Administration in 2016.

In January 2014, he received a Candidate of Sciences degree in Public Administration. In 2024, Barvinenko defended his doctoral dissertation in law, focusing on the administrative and legal structure of local government in Ukraine.

=== Political career ===
In 2006–2007 he headed the BYuT fraction in Odesa Regional Council. In March 2006, Vitaliy Barvinenko became the candidate for People's Deputy of Ukraine from Yulia Tymoshenko Bloc (BYuT), No. 154 in the list. In 2007, he was elected into parliament as No. 154 of BYuT.

In September 2010, Barvinenko was expelled from the faction of BYuT. In February 2011, he joined the faction of the Party of Regions.

In 2012 he was re-elected into parliament, winning a single-seat mandate for the Party of Regions in Odesa oblast.

In the 2014 parliamentary election, he again won a constituency seat in Odesa oblast as a non-partisan candidate with 26.66% of the votes. In parliament, he joined the parliamentary group Revival.

From 2014 to 2019, Vitaly Barvinenko served as a Member of Parliament of Ukraine in the VIII convocation and member of the Verkhovna Rada Committee on Legislative Support of Law Enforcement.

In 2013, he received the Order of Merit (3rd Class), and in 2014, he was awarded the title of Honorary Citizen of Vylkove.

=== Parliamentary work ===
Throughout his parliamentary career, Barvinenko submitted numerous legislative proposals, including amendments to the Labor Code and Criminal Code, focusing on labor trials and anti-smuggling measures. His initiatives included laws on social protection for former police officers and their families. In 2013, he organized the First Conference of Danube Region Parliamentarians in Ulm, Germany, facilitating cooperation among representatives from 14 Danube countries.

In April 2015, Barvinenko submitted a draft law demanding full recognition of the Armenian genocide.

He was involved in various parliamentary groups and delegations, including the Standing Delegation to the Euronest Parliamentary Assembly and interparliamentary groups with Bulgaria, the Czech Republic, Hungary, Romania, France, and Greece.

=== Odesa District Council ===
On December 15, 2020, Barvinenko was elected as the first head of the Odesa District Council. Under his leadership, Odesa District joined the European Association for Local Democracy (ALDA) and the Assembly of European Regions to strengthen international relations and implement European governance practices. In 2022, the council was recognized at the Congress of Local and Regional Authorities of the Council of Europe for its role in promoting local democracy.

In September 2023, Barvinenko was elected vice president of the Ukrainian Association of District and Regional Councils, representing Ukraine in international forums. In November 2023, Odesa District Council hosted the opening of ALDA's local office in Odesa to support regional reconstruction and development projects with EU partnerships.

=== Academic work ===
Vitaly Barvinenko holds a Doctorate in Law. He published over 30 academic articles in international and specialized journals and authored a monograph on municipal law. His academic contributions focus on public administration and the legal structure of local governance in Ukraine.

== See also ==
- 2007 Ukrainian parliamentary election
- List of Ukrainian Parliament Members 2007
- Verkhovna Rada
