= Oleksandr Medvedko =

Ukrainian politician

- Олександр Медведько

General Prosecutor of Ukraine
- In office 1 June 2007 – 3 November 2010
- President: Viktor Yushchenko
- Preceded by: Viktor Shemchuk (acting)
- Succeeded by: Viktor Pshonka
- In office 4 November 2005 – 26 April 2007
- President: Viktor Yushchenko
- Preceded by: Sviatoslav Piskun
- Succeeded by: Svyatoslav Piskun

Personal details
- Born: 25 July 1955 (age 71) Iskrivka, Zaporizhzhia Oblast, Ukrainian SSR, Soviet Union
- Education: Yaroslav the Wise Law Academy of Ukraine

Oleksandr Medvedko (Ukrainian: Олександр Іванович Медведько) is a Ukrainian former attorney who served as the Prosecutor General of Ukraine from 2005 to 2007 Medvedko was installed in a political deal with the Party of Regions.

== Biography ==
In December 2009, during the 2010 Ukrainian presidential election campaign, incumbent Prime Minister of Ukraine and presidential candidate Yulia Tymoshenko promised to replace Medvedko if elected president. Tymoshenko said Medvedko is controlled by the opposition Party of Regions headed by (also presidential candidate) Victor Yanukovych. According to her that has made it impossible to hold accountable individuals responsible for bank fraud on a massive scale during the fall of 2008.

Although Medvedko's term was set to expire in November 2012 Ukrainian President Victor Yanukovych dismissed Medvedko as prosecutor general on 3 November 2010. According to Yanukovych Medvedko had asked for his resignation because he believed "that there should be rotation of senior staff".
