= Kateryna Vashchuk =

Ukrainian politician (born 1947)

- Катерина Ващук
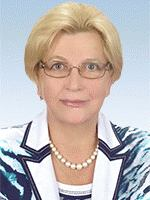
- Official portrait, 2012

People's Deputy of Ukraine
- In office 23 November 2007 – 21 February 2014
- Constituency: Lytvyn Bloc, No. 21 (2007–2014); Party of Regions, No. 45 (2012–2014)
- In office 11 May 1994 – 25 May 2006
- Constituency: Volyn Oblast, Horokhiv (1994–1998); Volyn Oblast, No. 20 (1998–2002); For United Ukraine!, No. 3 (2002–2006)

Personal details
- Born: 20 January 1947 (age 79) Verben, Ukrainian SSR, Soviet Union (now Ukraine)
- Party: Party of Regions
- Other political affiliations: Communist Party of the Soviet Union (before 1991); People's Party; For United Ukraine!; Lytvyn Bloc
- Education: Lutsk Pedagogical Institute; Lviv Agrarian University

Kateryna Tymofiivna Vashchuk (Ukrainian: Катерина Тимофіївна Ващук; born 20 January 1947) is a Ukrainian politician who served as a People's Deputy of Ukraine from 1994 to 2006 and from 2007 to 2014.

== Early life and education ==
Kateryna Vashchuk was born on 20 January 1947, in the village of Verben, Mlyniv Raion, Rivne Oblast.

=== Education ===
- Horokhiv Agricultural Technical College (1961—1966), agronomist.
- Lutsk Pedagogical Institute (1969—1974), history teacher.
- Lviv Agrarian University (1998—2001), economist.

== Career ==
In 1965-1968, Kateryna Vashchuk was the 2nd secretary of the Horokhiv Regional Committee of the Leninist Communist League of Youth of Ukraine. From 1968 to 1975, she was a responsible secretary of the Horokhiv Raion organization of the "Knowledge" Society. Between 1975 and 1977, Vashchuk headed the office of political education of the Horokhiv district committee of the Communist Party of Ukraine.

In 1977-1979, Vashchuk was a secretary of the party committee and deputy head of the Lenin collective farm in Horokhiv Raion. Between 1979 and 1994, she headed the collective farm named after the 25th Congress of the Communist Party of the Soviet Union (since 1990, an agricultural firm "Kolos"), also in Horokhiv Raion.

=== Political activity ===
From April 1994 to April 1998, Kateryna Vashchuk was a People's Deputy of Ukraine of the 2nd convocation from Horokhiv electoral district No. 69 in Volyn Oblast, nominated by the Agrarian Party of Ukraine. She was a Committee on Foreign Affairs and Relations Member with the Commonwealth of Independent States (CIS). At the time of the elections, she was the chairman of the board of the agricultural company "Kolos".

From March 1998 to April 2002, Vashchuk was a People's Deputy of Ukraine of the 3rd convocation from Ukraine's 20th electoral district in Volyn Oblast. She was the candidate for People's Deputies from the Agrarian Party of Ukraine, No. 1 on the list. Vashchuk was the Deputy head of the Committee on Agrarian Policy and Land Relations (July 1998 - February 2000). She was a member of the group "Independents" (July 1998 - February 1999), authorized representative of the group "Revival of the Regions" (February 1999 - April 2001), and authorized representative of the faction of the Democratic Union Party (April - July 2001). Chairman of the Committee on Agrarian Policy and Land Relations (since February 2000).

From April 2002 to April 2006, Vashchuk was a People's Deputy of Ukraine of the 4th convocation from the For United Ukraine! bloc, No. 3 on the list. She was a member of the United Ukraine faction (May - June 2002), authorized representative of the "Agrarians of Ukraine" faction (June - October 2002), head of the Agrarian Party of Ukraine faction (October 2002 - June 2004), authorized representative of the People’s Agrarian Party of Ukraine faction (June 2004 - March 2005), authorized representative of the People's Party faction (since March 2005), head of the subcommittee on issues of fiscal regulation of specific industries economy, free economic zones and investment regimes of the Committee on Finance and Banking (since June 2002).

She was a Member of the Commission on Agrarian and Land Reform under the President of Ukraine (March 1995 - February 1999); a member of the Commission on Agrarian Policy under the President of Ukraine (February 1999 - November 2001); a member of the Coordinating Council for Domestic Policy (September 1998 - December 1999); a member of the National Council on Adaptation of the Legislation of Ukraine to the Legislation of the European Union (August 2000 - February 2003).

Vashchuk is the author of the laws of Ukraine "On Amendments to the Law of Ukraine "On Value Added Tax" (13.07.2000), "On Amendments to the Law of Ukraine "On Value Added Tax" (18.01.2001), "On Stimulating the Development of Agriculture on period 2001-2004" (18.01.2001), "On fixed agricultural tax" (25.10.2001), and co-author of the Land Code of Ukraine (25.10.2001) and others. In 2007, Vashchuk was a candidate for People's Deputies of Ukraine from the Lytvyn Bloc, No. 21 on the list. From 2007 to 2012, she was a People's Deputy of Ukraine of the 6th convocation from the Lytvyn Bloc.

Vashchuk was a People's Deputy of Ukraine of the 7th Ukrainian Verkhovna Rada as the 45th candidate on the proportional list of the Party of Regions. She served from December 2012 to 21 February 2014. Non-partisan — from February 21 to 27, 2014.

Vashchuk is an honorary member of the Ukrainian Academy of Sciences (Department of Zootechnics, March 2001); a Member of the Agrarian Party of Ukraine (since 1996), head of the Agrarian Party of Ukraine (1997-1999), 1st deputy head of the Agrarian Party of Ukraine (since 1999). She is a Deputy head of the People's Party (since February 2005), head of the Volyn regional organization of the People's Party; head of the All-Ukrainian Union "Public Parliament of Women of Ukraine" (since July 2002); and member of the Presidium of the Ukrainian Academy of Sciences (since March 2001).

== Private life ==
- Father: Tymofii Filimonovych Sapizhuk (1918—1982), a collective farm worker.
- Mother: Hanna Danylivna (1922—1982), a collective farm worker.
- Husband: Viktor Ivanovich Vashchuk (born 1944), a paramedic at Berestechkiv District Hospital No. 2.
- Son Viktor (1966), an engineer at the agricultural company "Kolos" in Horokhiv district;
- Daughter Tetiana (1968), a doctor. Married to Andriy Petrovych Symonenko (son of Ukrainian politician Petro Simonenko).

== Awards and honors ==
- Meritorious employee of the village of Ukraine (1993).
- Orders of Merit of the III (1996), II (2000), and I class (2002).
- Certificate of Honor of the Cabinet of Ministers of Ukraine (2005).
