= Olha Bodnar =

Ukrainian politician

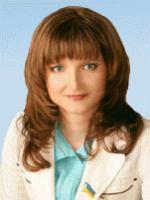
Bodnar in 2007

Olha Borysivna Bodnar (Ukrainian: Ольга Борисівна Боднар; born 19 February 1965) is a Ukrainian politician, People's Deputy of Ukraine, member of the 5th and 6th convocations of Verkhovna Rada of Ukraine, member of the faction Yulia Tymoshenko Bloc.

== Biography ==
Olha Bodnar was born on 19 February 1965 in Yampil, Vinnytsia Oblast. In 1987, she graduated from Kyiv National University, Department of Physics, qualified as physicist (molecular physics), and physics teacher.

=== Career ===
From 1998 to 2002, Olha Bodnar served as an assistant to the People's Deputy of Ukraine. Following this role, she held the position of Head of the Secretariat of the BYuT parliamentary fraction in Verkhovna Rada of Ukraine from 2002 to 2006. She was a People's Deputy of the 5th Verkhovna Rada (elected from the Yulia Tymoshenko Bloc, No. 126 in the list) from May 2006 till June 2007.

She was performing the duties of chairman of the subcommittee on state building and the administrative reform committee on state building, regional policy and local government (since July 2006). Olha Bodnar also has been the BYuT fraction member since May 2006. In November 2007 she was elected People's Deputy of the 6th Verkhovna Rada (elected from the Yulia Tymoshenko Bloc, No. 85 in the list)

In Verkhovna Rada Olha Bodnar is performing the following duties:

- First Deputy Chairman of Verkhovna Rada Committee on State Building and Local Government
- Deputy Co-Chairman of the Interparliamentary Assembly of the Verkhovna Rada of Ukraine and the Seimas of the Republic of Lithuania
- Member of the Ukrainian part of the Interparliamentary Assembly of the Verkhovna Rada of Ukraine, the Seimas of the Republic of Lithuania and the Sejm and Senate of Poland
- Member of the Ukrainian part of the Interparliamentary Assembly of Ukraine and the Republic of Poland
- Head of the Group for Interparliamentary Relations with the Republic of Lithuania
- Deputy Head of the Group for Interparliamentary Relations with Finland
- Deputy Head of the Group for Interparliamentary Relations with Montenegro
- Member of the Group for Interparliamentary Relations with Russia
- Member of the Group for Interparliamentary Relations with the United States of America
- Member of the Group for Interparliamentary Relations with the Italian Republic
- Member of the Group for Interparliamentary Relations with the Federal Republic of Germany
- Member of the Group for Interparliamentary Relations with the Swiss Confederation
- Member of the Group for Interparliamentary Relations with the Kingdom of Sweden
- Member of the Group for Interparliamentary Relations with the Kingdom of Denmark
- Member of the Group for Interparliamentary Relations with the Kingdom of Malaysia
- Member of the Group for Interparliamentary Relations with the Republic of Hungary
- Member of the Group for Interparliamentary Relations with Latvia
- Member of the Group for Interparliamentary Relations with the Kingdom of Belgium
- Member of the Group for Interparliamentary Relations with the Kingdom of Norway
- Member of the Group for Interparliamentary Relations with Australia
- Member of the Group for Interparliamentary Relations with the Republic of Estonia
- Member of the Group for Interparliamentary Relations with the United Kingdom of Great Britain and Northern Ireland
- Member of the Group for Interparliamentary Relations with the Kingdom of the Netherlands
- Member of the Group for Interparliamentary Relations with Israel
- Member of the Group for Interparliamentary Relations with Poland

In 2012 she was not re-elected into parliament on the party list of "Fatherland" (number 116).

== See also ==
- List of Ukrainian Parliament Members 2007
- Verkhovna Rada
