= Stanislav Arzhevitin =

Ukrainian businessperson

- Станіслав Аржевітін
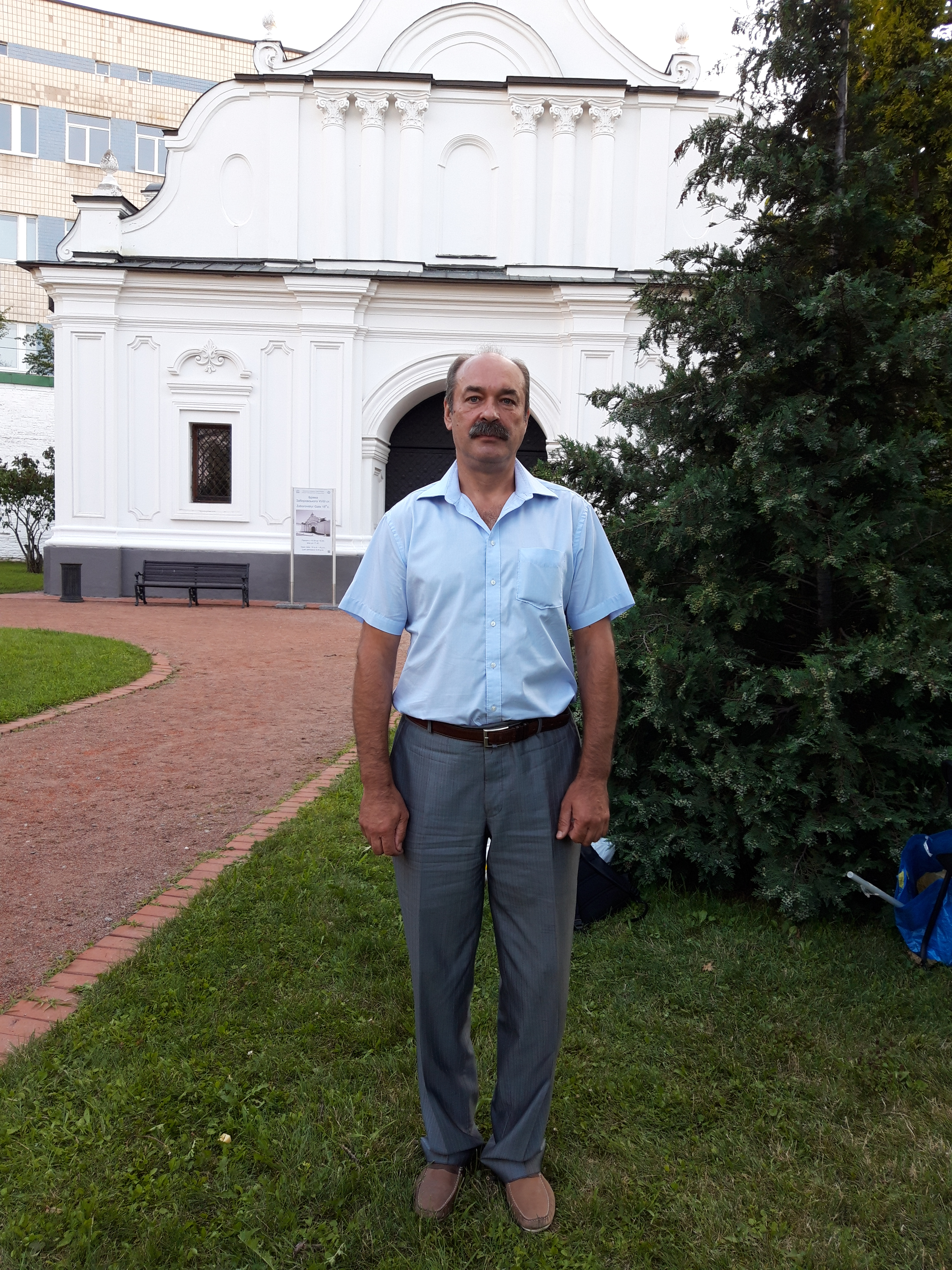

People's Deputy of Ukraine
- In office 23 November 2007 – 12 December 2012

People's Deputy of Ukraine
- In office 25 May 2005 – 15 June 2007

Personal details
- Born: 14 June 1961; Kolochava, Ukrainian SSR, Soviet Union (now Khust Raion, Zakarpattia oblast, Ukraine)
- Education: Vadym Hetman Kyiv National Economic University
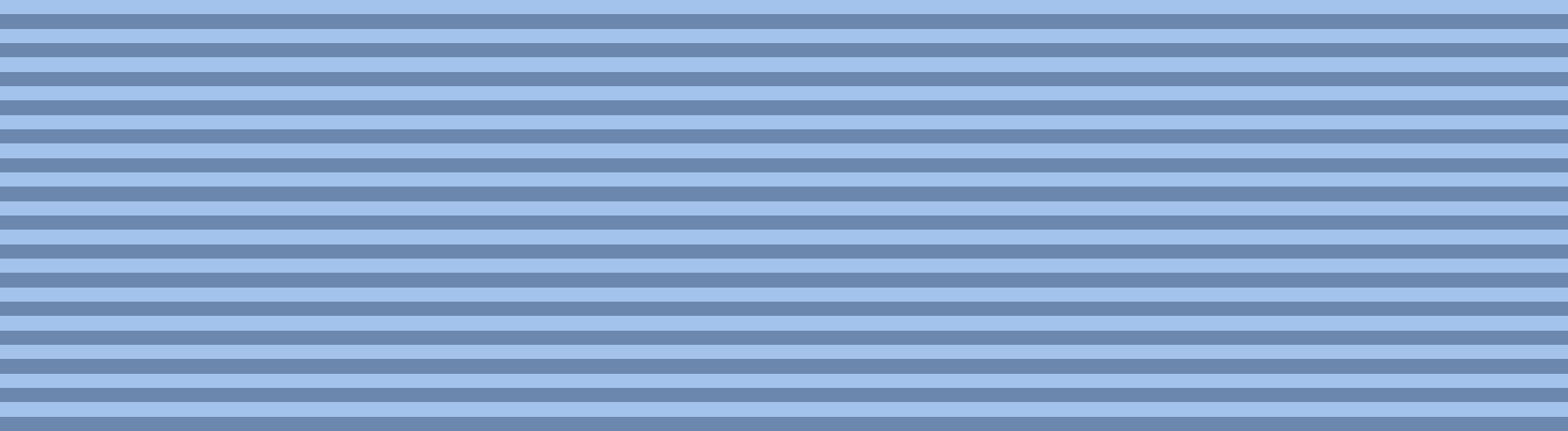
- Awards

Stanislav Mikhaylovich Arzhevitin (born June 14, 1961) is a Ukrainian businessman, Chairman of the Association of Ukrainian Banks, and People's Deputy of Verkhovna Rada.

== Biography ==
Stanislav Arzhevitin was born on June 14, 1961, in Kolochava, Mizhhiria Raion, Zakarpattia Oblast.

=== Education and career ===
Between 1978 and 1982, Arzhevitin studied at the Kyiv Institute of National Economy (now the National Economics University), before working for Construction Bank of the USSR, also known as Stroybank. From 1982 to 1984 he served in the USSR airborne forces, before continuing work at Stroybank. In 1991, he became Chairman of the Joint Stock Bank Azhio (now SEB Bank), a position he held until 2005.

Arzhevitin has studied in Germany (1992 and 1996), the USA (1993) and the Czech Republic (1994). In 1998 he received a PhD in Economics, with his thesis devoted to the problems of entrepreneurship and small business in Ukraine. He is an Academician of the National Academy of Human Problems, an Associate of the International Personnel Academy, and Scientific Adviser to the Academy of Environmental Sciences.

=== Social and political activities ===
Since 1996, Arzhevitin has been the General Treasurer of the Ukrainian Cossacks, Deputy Hetman of Ukraine and Captain-General.

In 2008, he founded the Zoreslav national literary prize, which aims to support writers and scholars who promote the creative achievements of the Zakarpattia region and the spiritual revival of Ukraine. He is also the author of two books about the history of Kolochava village.

In November 2007, he was elected People's Deputy of Ukraine in the 6th Verkhovna Rada, having been listed by the "Our Ukraine - People's Self-Defense Bloc". In 2008, founded the Zoreslav All-Ukrainian Literary Prize, which supports the activities of writers and scholars who popularize the creative heritage of Transcarpathia and contribute to the spiritual revival of Ukraine.

== Awards ==
- Order of Prince Yaroslav the Wise 5th class (June 27, 2012).
- Order of Merit, I class (2008), for significant contributions to the revival and development of the historical and cultural traditions of the Ukrainian Cossacks.
- Order of Merit, II class (2006), for personal contributions to the implementation of monetary policy, for ensuring the stable functioning of the banking system, and for maintaining a high standard of professionalism.
- Order of Merit, III class (1999), for professional achievements and long-term selfless work.
- Ivan Mazepa Cross (2010), an award given by the President of Ukraine for personal contributions to the revival of the Ukrainian historical heritage and professional activities.
- Certificate of Merit from Verkhovna Rada, for outstanding service to the Ukrainian people.
- Certificate of Merit from the Cabinet of Ministers of Ukraine (2001), for long-term hard work contributing to the development of the credit and financial markets of Ukraine, and professionalism and active social work.
- Order "Cossack Cross" from Ukrainian Cossacks.
- Personal award from Ukrainian Hetman.
- International Prize "Druzhba" (Friendship).
- International Prize "Slov'yany" (Slavs).
- International Prize "Patron of Ecology".
- "The International Community" award.
- National Prize of the "INCO" Bank.
- Silver Award of the National Bank of Ukraine.

== Family ==
Arzhevitin is married and has three sons. His wife's name is Irina, and his sons are named Pavlo (born 1987), Dmytro (born 1989) and Yaroslav (born 1999).

== See also ==
- List of Ukrainian Parliament Members 2007
- Verkhovna Rada
