= Valery Babenko =

Ukrainian politician

- Валерій Бабенко
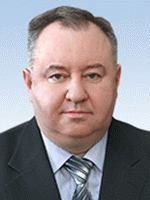

Member of the Verkhovna Rada
- In office 27 November 2014 – 29 August 2019

Member of the Verkhovna Rada
- In office 23 November 2007 – 12 December 2012

Personal details
- Born: Valeriy Borysovych Babenko; 2 February 1964 (age 62) Dnipropetrovsk, Ukraine, Soviet Union
- Party: People's Front

Valeriy Borysovych Babenko (Ukrainian: Валерій Борисович Бабенко; born on 2 February 1964), is a Ukrainian politician and former People's Deputy of Ukraine.

== Biography ==
Valery Babenko was born on February 2, 1964

In 2005–2006, was working as assistant to the Head of Security Service of Ukraine.

In the 2006 Ukrainian parliamentary election Babenko failed to get reelected to parliament as a candidate of Yulia Tymoshenko Bloc (placed No.181 on its election list).

In 2007 - assistant to the First deputy Secretary of the National Security and Defense Council of Ukraine.
In November 2007, Valery Babenko was elected the People's Deputy of Ukraine from Yulia Tymoshenko Bloc, No.144 on the list. Activities during plenary:

- Member of the Group of Interparliamentary Relations with Poland
- Member of the Group of Interparliamentary Relations with the Republic of Tunisia
- Member of the Group of Interparliamentary Relations with the Republic of Bulgaria
- Member of the Group of Interparliamentary Relations with the Federal Republic of Germany

In the 2012 Ukrainian parliamentary election, Babenko failed to get reelected to parliament as a candidate of All-Ukrainian Union "Fatherland" (placed No.98 on its election list).

In the 2014 Ukrainian parliamentary election, Babenko was re-elected into parliament placed 35th on the electoral list of People's Front.

Babenko did not take part in the 2019 Ukrainian parliamentary election.

== See also ==
- 2007 Ukrainian parliamentary election
- List of Ukrainian Parliament Members 2007
- Verkhovna Rada
