= Kostyantyn Bondaryev =

Ukrainian politician

Kostyantyn Bondarev
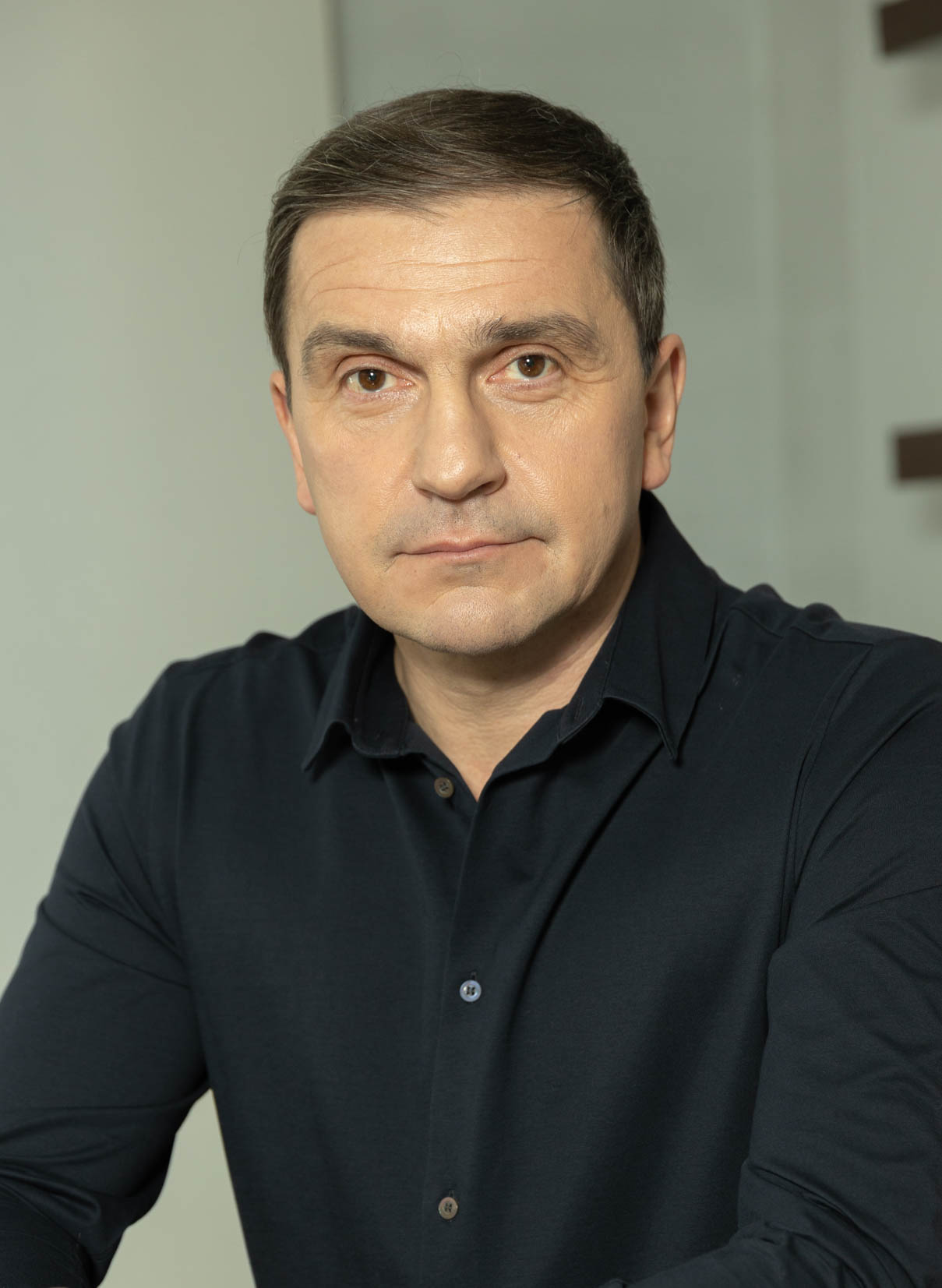
- Born: September 13, 1972 (age 53); Tashkent, Uzbek SSR, USSR
- Education: Kyiv National University of Engineering and Architecture, Kyiv National Economic University
- Occupation: Politician

Kostiantyn Anatoliiovych Bondarev (Ukrainian: Костянтин Анатолійович Бондарєв; born 13 September 1972) is a Ukrainian politician and public figure. He has served as a People's Deputy of Ukraine during the VI, VII, and IX convocations, representing the political party Batkivshchyna. Bondarev has held various parliamentary roles, focusing on transport, infrastructure, and tax policy. Since 2010, he has led the Kyiv Regional Organization of Batkivshchyna. He is also involved in humanitarian and sports initiatives, and is a member of the National Olympic Committee of Ukraine.

== Early life and education ==
Kostyantyn Bondarev was born on 13 September 1972 in Tashkent, Uzbek SSR. He graduated from Kyiv National University of Construction and Architecture in 2001 with a degree in urban construction and management. In 2004, he obtained a master's degree in business administration from Kyiv National Economic University.

Since 2023, he has been pursuing a Ph.D. at the National University of Physical Education and Sport of Ukraine, specializing in physical culture and sports.

== Business career ==
Kostyantyn Bondarev began his entrepreneurial activities in 1995. From 1997 to 2000, he worked at LLC "MAXI-K," one of Ukraine’s largest importers of fuel and lubricants, including serving as director. Between 2000 and 2003, he was an auditor-consultant at LLC "Tetra-Audit." From 2004 to 2017, he served as chair of the supervisory board of JSC "Bank VELES."

== Political career ==
Bondarev's political career began in 2002 when he was elected to the Kyiv Regional Council from the Ivankiv electoral district, where he served as deputy chair of the standing committee on budget and finance.

In 2004, he joined the Socialist Party of Ukraine (SPU), and in 2006, he led the SPU’s electoral headquarters in Kyiv region. Re-elected to the Kyiv Regional Council in 2006, he served as first deputy chair. However, following the SPU's coalition with the Party of Regions and the Communist Party of Ukraine, he left the SPU and resigned from his council position in July 2006.

In January 2007, Bondarev joined the political party Batkivshchyna. Later that year, he was elected to the Verkhovna Rada of Ukraine during its VI convocation as part of the Yulia Tymoshenko Bloc (No. 114 on the party list). He served as deputy chair of the Committee on Tax and Customs Policy and head of the Subcommittee on Excise Taxation.

In 2009, he chaired the Temporary Investigative Commission of the Verkhovna Rada investigating land rights violations in Kyiv Oblast.

In 2012, he was re-elected to Parliament (VII convocation) from Batkivshchyna (No. 45 on the party list), serving as First Deputy Chair of the Committee on Transport and Communications.

In 2019, Bondarev was elected to Parliament again (IX convocation) from Batkivshchyna (No. 14 on the party list). He currently chairs the Subcommittee on Pipeline Transport within the Committee on Transport and Infrastructure.

Bondarev is also:

A member of the Executive Committee of the National Parliamentary Group in the Inter-Parliamentary Union.

A participant in inter-parliamentary relations groups with Greece, Spain, Lithuania, South Korea, Moldova, Poland, France, and the Czech Republic.

A member of the Temporary Investigative Commission of the Verkhovna Rada, tasked with investigating management issues at the joint-stock company Ukrzaliznytsia since January 2021.

== Humanitarian Activities ==
Following the full-scale Russian invasion of Ukraine in 2022, Bondarev became actively engaged in humanitarian efforts. He initiated the "Social Canteen" project in Irpin, Kyiv Oblast, providing free hot meals to individuals facing difficult life circumstances. The canteen operates with the support of volunteer organizations and serves hundreds of people daily.

In March 2025, a Social Laundry facility was opened based on the canteen’s premises, offering free laundry and drying services to those in need. The facility is equipped with modern appliances and operated by volunteers.

== Sports Activities ==
Since 2010, Bondarev has been involved in amateur equestrian sports.

Since 2021, he has headed the Kyiv Regional Branch of the All-Ukrainian Federation of Equestrian Sports.

In 2024, he was appointed vice president and board member of the All-Ukrainian Federation of Equestrian Sports and became a member of the National Olympic Committee of Ukraine.

== Awards ==
Kostyantyn Bondarev has been awarded the Order of Prince Volodymyr, 3rd Class.

== Personal life ==
Kostiantyn Bondarev is married and has two daughters.

== See also ==
- List of Ukrainian Parliament Members 2007
- Verkhovna Rada
