= Nurulislam Arkallayev =

Ukrainian politician

- Нуруліслам Гаджиєвич Аркаллаєв
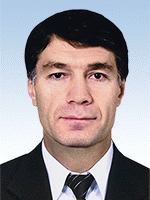

People's Deputy of Ukraine
- In office 25 May 2006 – 27 November 2014

Personal details
- Born: Nurulislam Hadzhyyevych Arkallayev; January 19, 1961 (age 65) Kumukh, Dagestan ASSR, Russian SFSR, Soviet Union
- Party: Party of Regions
- Education: Donetsk State University
- Occupation: Politician, businessman

Nurulislam Hadzhyyevych Arkallayev is the People's Deputy of Ukraine, a member of the Party of Regions.

Nurulislam Arkallayev was born on January 19, 1961, in Kumukh village, Laksky district, Dagestan, Russia.

== Family ==
Spouse Arkallayeva Umamat Alilivna (1972), sons Arslan (1991), Murat (1993), Ramzan (2001).

== Education ==
Nurulislam Arkallayev graduated from Donetsk State University in 1988, majoring in "Accounting and business analysis".

== Career ==
- 1999-2004 - Deputy Director for foreign economic policy in the joint venture "UkrRos Invest."
- 2004-2005 - Deputy Director for foreign monetary policy of LLC "Aquilon."
- 2005-2006 - Chairman of the Supervisory Board, LLC "Aquilon."

== Politics ==
May 2006 - November 2007 - People's Deputy in the 5th Verkhovna Rada from Party of Regions, No. 72 in the list

Since July 2006 has been a Member of the Committee for Family, Youth Policies, Sport, and Tourism.

Re-elected in the 2012 elections for the Party of Regions.

He did not participate in the 2014 elections.

== Sport ==
President of Donetsk Region Judo Federation (since 2003), USSR Master of sports in judo.

== See also ==
- List of Ukrainian Parliament Members 2007
- Verkhovna Rada
