= Jan Tabachnyk =

Ukrainian composer and politician (1945–2023)

- Ян Табачник
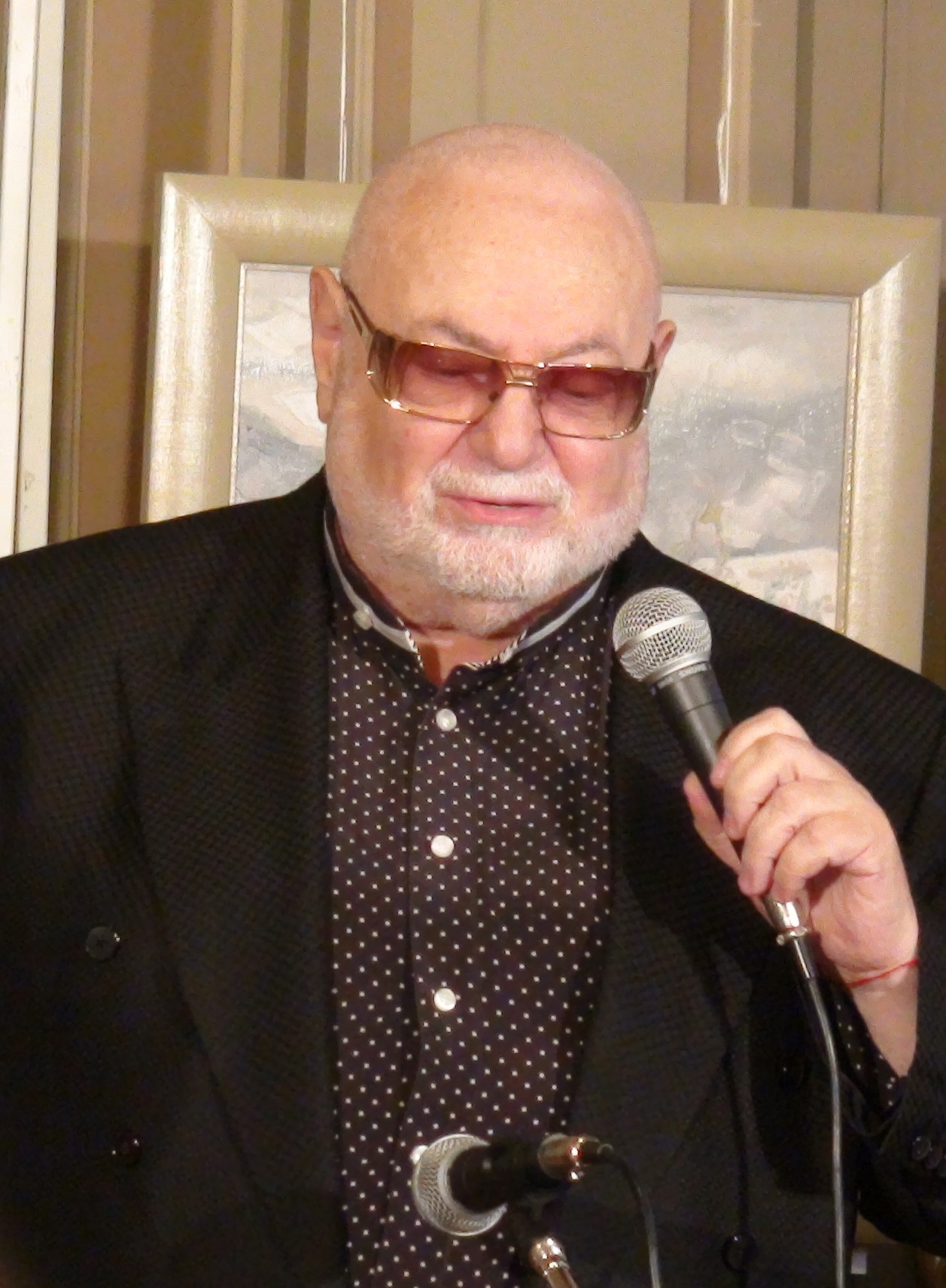
- Tabachnyk in 2013
- Born: Jan Petrovych Tabachnyk; 31 July 1945; Chernivtsi, Ukrainian SSR, USSR
- Died: 11 September 2023 (aged 78); Tel Aviv, Israel
- Occupations: Accordionist; politician; entrepreneur
- Title: People's Artist of Ukraine (1994)
- Awards: Order of Prince Yaroslav the Wise (5th Class); Order of Merit (1st class); Order of Merit (2nd class); Order of Merit (3rd class)

Jan Petrovych (Yakov Pinevich, Yakiv Pinevych) Tabachnyk (Ukrainian: Ян Петрович Табачник; 31 July 1945 – 11 September 2023) was a Soviet and Ukrainian variety composer, accordionist, politician and entrepreneur.

== Biography ==
Tabachnyk was born on 31 July 1945 into a Jewish family. He was a member of the Party of Regions, a deputy of the Verkhovna Rada (5th and 6th convocations). Tabachnyk was placed at number 18 on the electoral list of Party of Regions during the 2012 Ukrainian parliamentary election. He was re-elected into parliament. Tabachnyk did not take part in elections later. He died on 11 September 2023, at the age of 78.

== Awards ==
- People's Artist of Ukraine (1994)
- Order of Merit (III grade) (August 1999)
- Order of Merit (II grade) (May 2002)
- Order of Merit (I grade) (August 2004)
