= Viktor Shemchuk =

Ukrainian politician

- Віктор Шемчук
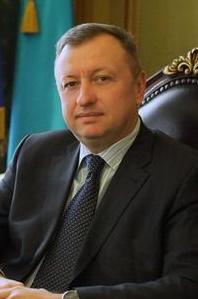

Governor of Lviv Oblast
- In office 2 March 2013 – 31 October 2013
- Preceded by: Mykhailo Kostiuk
- Succeeded by: Oleh Salo

Acting Prosecutor General of Ukraine
- In office 24 May 2007 – 1 June 2007
- Preceded by: Svyatoslav Piskun
- Succeeded by: Oleksandr Medvedko

Presidential representative of Ukraine in Crimea
- In office 21 February 2007 – 4 May 2007
- Preceded by: Hennadiy Moskal
- Succeeded by: Volodymyr Khomenko

People's Deputy of Ukraine

6th convocation
- In office 23 November 2007 – 12 December 2012
- Constituency: Our Ukraine–People's Self-Defense Bloc, 33rd on party list

Personal details
- Born: Viktor Viktorovych Shemchuk; 4 November 1970 (age 55) Ternopil, Ukrainian SSR, Soviet Union
- Party: Non-partisan
- Education: Lviv University

Viktor Viktorovych Shemchuk (Ukrainian: Віктор Вікторович Шемчук; born 4 November 1970) is a Ukrainian politician.

== Early life ==
Shemchuk was born on 4 November 1970 in the city of Ternopil, which was then part of the Ukrainian SSR in the Soviet Union. After graduating from the University of Lviv in 1993 within the Faculty of Law, he started working as an intern at the Prosecutor's Office of Ternopil. He steadily worked his way up within the office until 1999, becoming an assistant prosecutor, investigator, then senior investigator.

In January 1999, he transferred to the Proseecutor's Office of Simferopol, becoming an investigator there. He was then appointed Deputy Head of the Department for Oversight of Special Units Fighting Organized Crime there, and was the head of that department until 2005. In 2005, he was briefly acting prosecutor for AR Crimea, before being fully appointed as prosecutor for AR Crimea until 2007.

== Political career ==
In 2007 he served as a Presidential representative of Ukraine in Crimea. That same year, he served as Acting Prosecutor General of Ukraine, and then again as Prosecutor of AR Crimea. However, with the ban on dual mandates, when he was elected during the 2007 Ukrainian parliamentary election as a People's Deputy, he gave up those positions. He was elected from Our Ukraine–People's Self-Defense Bloc, as no. 33 on the list, and served as a member of the Committee on Legislative Support of Law Enforcement, and he served for one term until 2012.

In March 2014, he came back into power when he was appointed Governor of Lviv Oblast, which he did until October 2013. He then became an adviser to the President of Ukraine.

== Later years ==
In 2014, after his retirement from politics, he became an associate professor Hetman Petro Sahaidachnyi National Ground Forces Academy in Lviv, working there until 2016. Simultaneously, he worked as a scientific consultant to the Verkhovna Rada Committee on Law Enforcement and as deputy head of the working group on cyber-security and cybercrime legislation reform. Since 2017, he has been deputy chair of the Qualification‑Disciplinary Commission of Prosecutors.
