= Olena Biryuk =

Soviet-Ukrainian rhythmic gymnast and coach

- Олена Василівна Бірюк
- Born: 8 October 1932; Malaya Struzhka, Kamenets-Podolsky, Ukrainian SSR
- Died: 9 September 2021 (aged 88)
- Education: National University of Ukraine on Physical Education and Sport
- Years active: 1954-?

Olena Vasylivna Biryuk (Ukrainian: Олена Василівна Бірюк; 8 October 1932 – 9 September 2021) was a Soviet and Ukrainian rhythmic gymnast and coach.

== Biography ==
Biryuk was born in the village of Malaya Struzhka, Kamenets-Podolsky region of the Ukrainian SSR. Almost immediately after her birth, the family moved to the Urals.

She studied at the Sverdlovsk Physical Education College at the Labor Reserves School, in 1954 she graduated from the National University of Ukraine on Physical Education and Sport.

She became a four-time champion of the USSR (1956–1958, 1963) and a 12-time champion of the Ukrainian SSR in rhythmic gymnastics. The first Ukrainian gymnast, and one of the first in the USSR, to receive the title of Honored Master of Sports in 1964.

After her retirement she taught at the Department of Physical Education at the Kiev State Institute of Physical Culture (1954–1958); then worked as an associate professor of this university (1958–1993). At the same time, she worked as a coach of the Burevestnik club. She worked as a coach in Italy, Finland and Switzerland for some time. She was awarded the Order of the Badge of Honour and the Medal for Labor Valor.

In the 80s she wrote books on rhythmic gymnastics, "Rhythmic gymnastics: A method" (1981), "Rhythmic gymnastics: Method Recommendations" (1986), and also promoted it on the Ukrainian television. In 2006, she was awarded a scholarship of the Cabinet of Ministers of Ukraine.

Biryuk died on 9 September 2021 from coronary artery disease at the age of 88, she is buried in the Southern Cemetery in Kyiv.
