= Svyatoslav Piskun =

Ukrainian politician (born 1959)

- Святослав Піскун
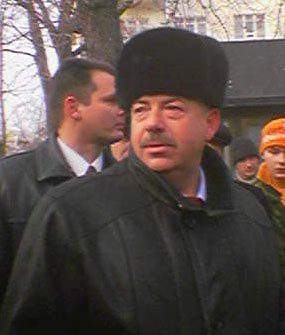
- Piskun in 2004

Prosecutor General of Ukraine
- In office 26 April 2007 – 24 May 2007
- President: Viktor Yushchenko
- Preceded by: Oleksandr Medvedko
- Succeeded by: Viktor Shemchuk (acting)
- In office 10 December 2004 – 14 October 2005
- President: Viktor Yushchenko
- Preceded by: Hennadiy Vasylyev
- Succeeded by: Oleksandr Medvedko
- In office 6 July 2002 – 29 October 2003
- President: Leonid Kuchma
- Preceded by: Mykhailo Potebenko
- Succeeded by: Hennadiy Vasylyev

Personal details
- Born: 8 March 1959 (age 67) Berdychiv, Zhytomyr Oblast, Ukrainian SSR, Soviet Union
- Party: Independent
- Other political affiliations: Party of Regions (2006–2007)
- Spouse: Svitlana Sevast'yanivna (1962)
- Children: Tetyana (1983), Svyatoslav (2000)
- Education: Lviv University

Svyatoslav Mykhaylovych Piskun (Ukrainian: Святослав Михайлович Піскун, born 1 March 1959) was 3 times Prosecutor General of Ukraine. He served in this role in 2002–2003, 2005 and 2007 until President Viktor Yushchenko's dismissed Piskun on 24 May 2007. He worked as a prosecutor in several important cases, including murder of Georgiy Gongadze and investigation of United Energy Systems of Ukraine.

== Political career ==
In March 2006 he was elected as a people's deputy of the Verkhovna Rada from Party of Regions list as No.96 – but he was not a party member. Piskun was elected in parliament for Party of Regions again in 2007. He became a full member of Party of Regions in October 2008. Piskun did not return to parliament after the 2012 Ukrainian parliamentary election after losing in single-member districts number 63 (first-past-the-post wins a parliament seat) located in Zhytomyr Oblast. In the 2014 Ukrainian parliamentary election Khoroshkovskyi tried to return to national politics this time from the party of Strong Ukraine (placing 16th on the parties election list). But in the election the party failed to clear the 5% election threshold (it got 3.11% of the votes) and thus Piskun was not elected into parliament. Piskun was only allowed to take part in the election after a court decision validated his entrance in the election, at first the Central Election Commission of Ukraine had refused to register him because in the last 5 years leading up to the election he had not lived in Ukraine.

== Dismissals as Prosecutor General of Ukraine ==
According to Piskun, his dismissal by President Yushchenko in October 2005 came because he stopped criminal proceedings against Yulia Tymoshenko and refused to drop proceedings against Petro Poroshenko. He was criticized for closing the criminal case related to the United Energy Systems of Ukraine while serving under Viktor Yushchenko's government in 2005. and dropping criminal cases regarding back-then Prime Minister Yulia Tymoshenko.

Piskun is the only Prosecutor General of Ukraine in Ukraine whose dismissals by two Presidents have been overturned as unlawful by courts. The latest being a 24 April 2009 Kyiv Court of Appeals passing of a ruling saying President Yushchenko's decree dated 24 May 2007, dismissing Sviatoslav Piskun from the post of the prosecutor general was unlawful, but Piskun did not submit any application for his reinstating on the post of Prosecutor General.

== Career since 2014 ==
On 30 March 2014 during an interview with Inter TV channel he called for the criminal prosecution of Ukrainian officials who are responsible for allowing the 2014 Russian annexation of Crimea.

On 30 July 2020 Prosecutor General Iryna Venediktova appointed Piskun as her personal adviser on a voluntary basis. On 25 August 2020 Venediktova (without communicating the reason) realised him as her personal adviser.
