= Olena Bondarenko (politician, born 1955) =

Ukrainian politician

- Олена Бондаренко
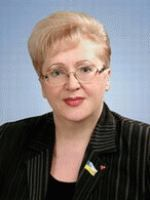
- Official Verkhovna Rada portrait, 2007

People's Deputy of Ukraine
- In office 12 May 1998 – 12 December 2012
- Constituency: People's Movement, No. 13; (1998–2002); Viktor Yushchenko Bloc, No. 37; (2002–2006); Yulia Tymoshenko Bloc, No. 89; (2006–2012)

Personal details
- Born: 13 February 1955 (age 71) Tayshet, Irkutsk Oblast, Russian SFSR, Soviet Union
- Party: Batkivshchyna (2006–2012)
- Other political affiliations: People's Movement of Ukraine (1998–2002); Reforms and Order Party (2002–2006); Yulia Tymoshenko Bloc (2006–2012)
- Education: Taras Shevchenko National University of Kyiv

Olena Fedorivna Bondarenko (Ukrainian: Олена Федорівна Бондаренко; born 13 February 1955) is a Ukrainian politician who served as a People's Deputy of Ukraine from 1998 to 2012, representing the People's Movement of Ukraine, Reforms and Order Party (as part of the Viktor Yushchenko Bloc), and Batkivshchyna (as part of the Yulia Tymoshenko Bloc). In 2000, she was awarded with Order of Merit, third class.

== Biography ==
Bondarenko was born on 13 February 1955, in Tayshet, Irkutsk Oblast, Russia, in a concentration camp for political prisoners. Her father was a surgeon Ferenc Varkoni (1920–1988), her mother Olha Bondarenko (b. 1926) was an engineer. Bondarenko is married, her husband Dmytro Basiliya (b. 1948) is a physician, they have one daughter Olha (b. 1990). She graduated Taras Shevchenko National University of Kyiv twice:

- 1994 - Faculty of Journalism
- 2000 - Legal Faculty

=== Career ===
- August 1979 - June 1983 - Accountant, Luhansk Organization of the Union of Writers of Ukraine
- February 1984 - August 1986 - Assistant, Luhansk organization of the "Znanie" (eng.- knowledge) society
- September 1986- May 1993 - radio announcer, Luhansk clothing association "Style", correspondent of the newspaper "Patriot Rodiny" (eng.- patriot of the homeland)
- May 1989 - June 1990 VKR UNDL. December 1989- October 1991 - Deputy Chairman, Luhansk regional Rukh organization
- October 1991 - June 1993 - chairman, Lugansk regional Rukh organization
- June 1993-April 1994 - Head of political analysis department, Rukh secretariat
- April 1994 - 1997 - Deputy Chairman of the Rukh movement, Head of ideology, propaganda and agitation sector
- January 1997 - May 1998 - editor-in-chief of the newspaper "Chas/Time"

=== Verkhovna Rada ===
- March 1998 - April 2002 - People's Deputy of Ukraine in the 3rd Verkhovna Rada, No. 13 on the list, elected from Rukh.

At the time of the election Bondarenko was Deputy Chairman of the Rukh movement, editor-in-chief of the newspaper "Chas/Time". In Verkhovna Rada she was member of the Committee on Rules, deputy ethics and organizational management of Verkhovna Rada of Ukraine (since July 1998).

- January 2005-April 2006 - People's Deputy of the 4th convocation in Verkhovna Rada, from the Viktor Yushchenko bloc "Our Ukraine", No. 74 in the list. Member of the Committee on freedom of speech and information (since April 2005).
- since April 2006 - People's Deputy of Ukraine in the 5th Verkhovna Rada, elected from the Yulia Tymoshenko Bloc, No. 89 in the list. At the time of elections she was MP, a member of the Fatherland bloc.
- since November 2007 - People's Deputy of the 6th convocation, elected from Yulia Tymoshenko bloc
- Chairman of the Subcommittee on international legal affairs and gender policy committee of the Verkhovna Rada of Ukraine on human rights, national minorities and international relations
- Member of Returning Board of the 6th Verkhovna Rada of Ukraine
- Member of the Ukrainian part of the Interparliamentary Assembly of the Verkhovna Rada of Ukraine, the Seimas of the Republic of Lithuania and the Sejm and Senate of Poland
- Member of the Ukrainian part of the Interparliamentary Assembly of Ukraine and the Republic of Poland
- Member of the permanent delegation to the Parliamentary Assembly of the Council of Europe
- Member of the Group for Interparliamentary Relations with the Republic of Lithuania
- Member of the Group for Interparliamentary Relations with the French Republic
- Member of the Group for Interparliamentary Relations with the Federal Republic of Germany
- Member of the Group for Interparliamentary Relations with the Republic of Portugal
- Member of the Group for Interparliamentary Relations with the Kingdom of Malaysia
- Member of the Group for Interparliamentary Relations with Poland
- Member of the Group for Interparliamentary Relations with Israel
- Member of the Group for Interparliamentary Relations with the Great Socialist People's Libyan Arab Jamahiriya
- Member of the Group for Interparliamentary Relations with the Republic of Croatia

Bondarenko was placed at number 105 on the electoral list of Batkivshchina during the 2012 Ukrainian parliamentary election. She was not re-elected into parliament. She did not participate in the 2014 Ukrainian parliamentary election.

=== Hobbies ===
Bondarenko is fond of poetry and music. She is the author of the collection of poems "Youth Age" (1980). Her works were printed in Bulgarian, Polish, Belarusian and Russian. She is fluent in Polish.

== See also ==
- List of members of the parliament of Ukraine, 2007–2012
