= Lev Biryuk =

Ukrainian politician

- Лев Бірюк
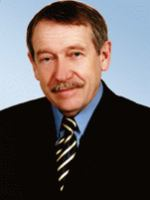

Member of the Verkhovna Rada
- In office 16 March 2005 – 12 December 2012

Personal details
- Born: Lev Vasylovych Biryuk; 31 May 1946 (age 80) Horodnia, Ukraine, Soviet Union
- Party: Yulia Tymoshenko Bloc

Lev Vasiylovych Biryuk (Ukrainian: Лев Васильович Бірюк; born on 31 May 1946), is a Ukrainian politician who had served as the member of the Verkhovna Rada from 2005 to 2012.

In 2011, he was awarded with Order of Merit, III class.

== Biography ==
Lev Biryuk was born on 31 May 1946, in Horodnia, Chernihiv region. In 1956 the family moved to Khmelnytsky.

=== Education ===
Biryuk studied in secondary school No. 1 in Khmelnitsky, in 1988 he graduated from Kamenetz-Podolsk Pedagogical Institute (in absentia), as a teacher of physical culture and sports.

=== Career ===
From 1963 to 1967, he worked at a brick factory, at a press-forging equipment plant in Khmelnitsky

From 1967 to 1969, he served in the Soviet Army.

From 1969 to 1977, he worked as electrician on ships, international routes, Novorossiysk Shipping Company.

From 1977 to 1992, he was an assembly fitter, fitness instruktor at Khmelnitsk plant "Temp", senior lecturer at Khmelnitsk technical school No. 25.

=== Politics ===
From 1990 to March 2005, he was an assistant-consultant of People's Deputy of Ukraine.

On 16 March March 2005, Biryuk was elected as a People's Deputy of the 4th Verkhovna Rada, elected from Yushchenko bloc "Our Ukraine», No. 76 in the list. He was a member of the Social Policy and Labour Committee in May 2005.

In May 2006, he was reelected to the 5th Verkhovna Rada, elected from Yulia Tymoshenko Bloc, No. 111 in the list. He was a member of the Social Policy and Labour Committee since July 2006.

In November 2007, he was reelected to the 6th Verkhovna Rada, elected from the Yulia Tymoshenko Bloc, No. 112 in the list He was the Chairman of the Subcommittee on the organization of Verkhonva Rada Committee on Rules, Ethics and Support to Work of the Verkhovna Rada.

He was the Counting Board Member of the 6th Verkhovna Rada.

He had been a member of the Permanent Delegation to the Parliamentary Assembly of the Organization for Security and Cooperation in Europe. He was the head of the Group for Interparliamentary Relations with Libya.

He was a member of the Group for Interparliamentary Relations with the United Kingdom, United States, Germany, Denmark, Vietnam, Montenegro, South Africa, the Netherlands, France and Italy

In 2012 he was not re-elected into parliament

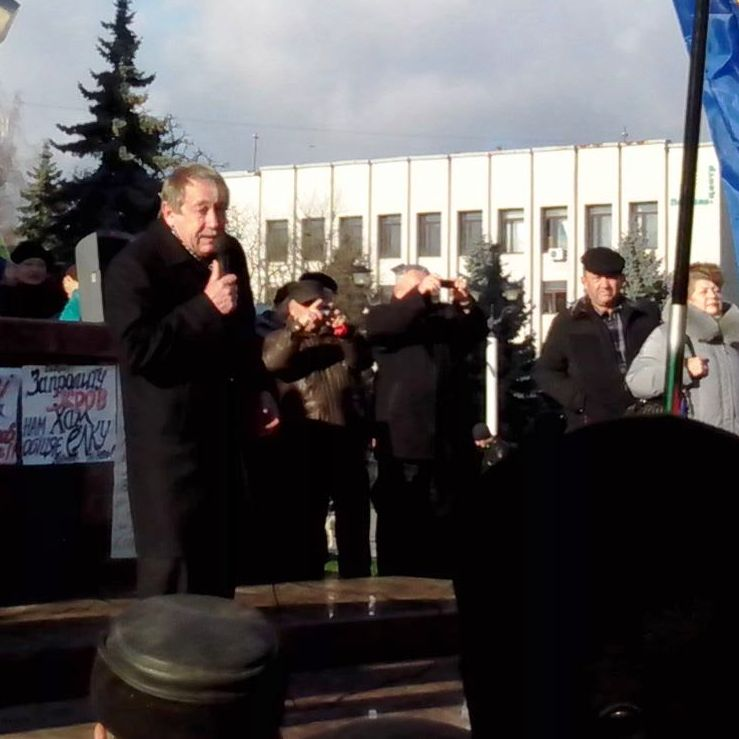
Lev Biryuk in 2013

=== Social activities ===
A member of the People's Movement of Ukraine (Rukh):

- Chairman of Khmelnytsky city organization of Rukh (in 1989–1999)
- Head of Organising Office of the Rukh Secretariat (1992–1993)
- Member of the Central Office of Rukh (1992–1999)
- Chairman of Khmelnytsky city organization of Rukh (1994–1997)
- Chairman of Khmelnitsky regional organization of Rukh (1997–1999)

=== Family ===
Lev Biryuk is married with two children: daughter Yuliya and son Dmytro; his wife Nataliya is and engineer at "Oblpalyvo" company.

== See also ==
- 2007 Ukrainian parliamentary election
- List of Ukrainian Parliament Members 2007
- People's Movement of Ukraine
