= Olena Bondarenko (politician, born 1974) =

Ukrainian journalist and politician

- Олена Бондаренко
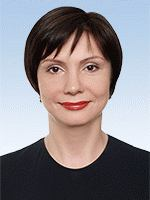
- Official portrait, 2012

People's Deputy of Ukraine
- In office 25 May 2006 – 27 November 2014

Personal details
- Born: 26 May 1974 (age 52) Makiivka, Donetsk Oblast, Ukrainian SSR, Soviet Union
- Party: Party of Regions

Olena Anatoliivna Bondarenko (née Kovalenko; Ukrainian: Олена Анатоліївна Бондаренко; born 26 May 1974) is a Ukrainian politician and journalist who served as the People's Deputy of Ukraine from 2006 to 2014.

A member of the Party of Regions, she was the 1st Deputy Chairman of the Committee of Verkhovna Rada on freedom of speech and information; Head of Subcommittee of Television and Radio Broadcasting Committee of the Verkhovna Rada of Ukraine on freedom of speech and information.

Bondarenko did not participate in the 2014 Ukrainian parliamentary election. And in the 2019 Ukrainian parliamentary election, she lost in Mykolayiv Oblast’s District 131, with 8% of the votes.

== Biography ==
Bondarenko was born on 26 May 1974, in Makiivka, Donetsk Oblast. Her father, Anatoliy, is a miner, and her mother is a nurse.

=== Education ===
In 1991, Bondarenko entered Donetsk State University, Department of History. When at the third year, she entered the Faculty of related and complementary disciplines, with a qualification in journalism. In 1996, she graduated from both faculties.

From 1994 to 1995, she was a writer for the weekly "Donetsk News".

From 1995 to 1998, she was an editor of the information service at "Ukraine" TV channel

In 1998, he was a journalist at "Inter-Seal" TV channel, Donetsk regional office of "Inter" TV channel During that time she implemented two of her own projects: the weekly review of political activities in the region "Labyrinths Of Politics" and "Political Chronicles". From 1998 to April 2001, she was an editor of the information service at "New Donbas" TV channel.

From April to September 2001, he became the Director of Communications at Donetsk Regional Organization of Party of Greens

Between 2002 and 2006, she was the Director of press service of Donetsk Regional Council

Co-working with Borys Kolesnikov, who in 2003 headed the Donetsk regional branch of Party of Regions, predetermined further political career of Bondarenko. She not only became the personal media consultant for Boris Kolesnikov, but also was one of the key players in the team. She managed to create an effective press service and ensure smooth communication between People's Deputies and Kolesnikov and the media.

In 2004, Bondarenko graduated from the Department of Administrative Management, Donetsk State Academy of Management.

=== Political career ===
From May 2005 to April 2006, she was and assistant-consultant to the People's Deputy of Ukraine.

In May 2006, Bondarenko was elected People's Deputy of the 5th convocation of the Verkhovna Rada, from the Party of Regions, No. 125 in the list.

In July 2006, she became the 1st vice-chairman of the committee on freedom of speech and information, and then was promoted as the Chairman of the Subcommittee of the Advertising Committee on freedom of speech and information. Bondarenko was a member of the temporary investigatory commission to investigate the death of Georgy Gongadze and to check facts of corruption and abuse of power by some Ministry of Internal Affairs officers. Her major legislative initiatives related to basic laws: the law on advertising, the law on television and radio, and the law about the National Council on Television and Radio. Bondarenko criticized the National Council on public as saw the acts of abuses and illegal actions in its activities and even initiated a special Verkhovna Rada inquiry commission.

In November 2007, she was reelected to the 6th convocation of Verkhovna Rada, No. 146 in the list. During parliamentary elections in 2007, Bondarenko led the Department of Communications of the central campaign office of the Party of Regions. Since December 2007 she has been the member of the committee on freedom of speech and information, Party of Regions faction member since November 2007, member of Ukrainian National Union of Journalists.

In 2012, she was re-elected into parliament on the party list of Party of Regions.

Bondarenko did not participate in the 2014 Ukrainian parliamentary election. And in the 2019 Ukrainian parliamentary election, she lost in Mykolayiv Oblast’s District 131, with 8% of the votes.

=== Criticism ===
In January 2014, a deleted Facebook comment of Myroslava Gongadze claimed she was banned from entering the United States again.

Bondarenko has been the topic of increased concern with regards to human rights in Ukraine. After a special session of parliament on January 29, 2014, Bondarenko agreed to an interview during which activists gathered around her showing various pictures of journalists who were either beaten or murdered by police during the protests in Kiev. After being asked whether she was saddened by the violence, Bondarenko coldly responded that journalist are in a zone of war and quickly left the room.

On 10 September 2014, she wrote a testimonial about the alarming situation of human rights of the opposition in Ukraine

== Family ==
She is married to her husband, Andriy Bondarenko (born in 1969), whom, from 2010 to 2012 was the Vice Minister of Emergencies

They have a daughter, Polina (born in 1999) and son Mykhailo (born in 2010)

== See also ==
- 2007 Ukrainian parliamentary election
- List of Ukrainian Parliament Members 2007
- Party of Regions
