= Hennadiy Vasilyev =

Ukrainian politician

Hennady Vasilyev
- Геннадій Васильєв
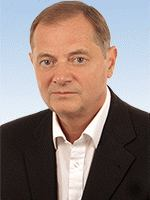

6th First Deputy Chairman of the Verkhovna Rada of Ukraine
- In office May 28, 2002 – November 8, 2003
- Preceded by: Viktor Medvedchuk
- Succeeded by: Adam Martynyuk

Prosecutor General of Ukraine
- In office November 8, 2003 – December 9, 2004
- Preceded by: Svyatoslav Piskun
- Succeeded by: Svyatoslav Piskun

Personal details
- Born: October 3, 1953 (age 73) Donetsk, Ukrainian SSR
- Party: Party of Regions
- Education: PhD

Hennadiy Vasilyev (Ukrainian: Геннадій Андрійович Васильєв; born 10 March 1953) is a People's Deputy of Ukraine of the 2nd, 3rd, 4th, 6th and 7th convocations. He is a member of the Party of Regions faction in the parliament while remaining formally unaffiliated.

== Biography ==
Hennadiy Vasilyev was born in Donetsk. In 1976, he graduated from the Kharkiv Law Institute with a PhD in law. His father, Andrei Antonovich was an engineer, and his mother, Hanna Omelyanivna was a nurse.

=== Legal career ===
Vasilyev first entered the workforce in 1976 after graduating in Kharkiv by becoming a trainee investigation officer in the Prosecutor's Office of the Leninsky District, which is part of the city of Donetsk. He was promoted to executive assistant to the prosecutor in 1979, which he held until 1981 when he left the district. He then briefly worked as Prosecutor of the Investigation Department and as a prosecutor-criminal for the Prosecutor's Office of Donetsk Oblast from January to May 1981. He returned to the Leninsky District having been promoted to prosecutor in 1981, which he did for three years until transferring to become Head of the Investigation Department of the Prosecutor's Office of Donetsk Oblast. He was once again transferred in 1988 after he was briefly appointed as Deputy Head of the Investigation Department and later Head of the General Supervision Department for the Prosecutor's Office of the Soviet Union (USSR). He left after one year when he was appointed Deputy Prosecutor of his native Donetsk Oblast, which he did until the collapse of the Soviet Union. After its collapse, he was appointed Prosecutor of Donetsk Oblast, which he did up until 1988 while simultaneously having a mandate in the parliament.

== Political career ==
During the 1994 Ukrainian parliamentary elections, he successfully obtained a mandate for the 2nd convocation of the Verkhovna Rada to be a People's Deputy of Ukraine. He was initially a member of the "Independent" faction of non-partisan politicians, and was also a member of the Committee on Law and Order. He was re-elected in the 1998 Ukrainian parliamentary election for constituency No. 61 (Donetsk Oblast), and again during the 2002 Ukrainian parliamentary elections. Shortly after the start of the 4th convocation, he was appointed First Deputy Chairman of the Rada, which he did for a year until he voluntarily resigned his mandate in the Rada in order to become General Prosecutor of Ukraine. He was dismissed in 2004 by Leonid Kuchma, and awards just became a member of the Crisis Centre.

In January 2005, he became a member of the pro-Russian and socialist party Derzhava. After joining, he was chosen to lead the party. He then once again ran in the Rada during the 2007 Ukrainian parliamentary elections, although not for Derzhava which he had left, but for the Party of Regions, and was selected. During his term in parliament, from 2010 to 2011, he was also Deputy Head of the Presidential Administration of Ukraine. After Euromaidan and the declaration of the snap 2014 Ukrainian parliamentary elections, he chose not to run for reeleciton in the Rada.

=== Family ===
Hennadiy Vasilyev is married, and has a son and a daughter.

== Honours and awards ==
- Honorary chairman of the public organization known as "Spadshchyna Monomakha" (Heritage of Monomakh)
- Honored Lawyer of Ukraine, honored worker of Prosecutor's office of Ukraine (June 1997).
