= Artem Pshonka =

Ukrainian politician

- Артем Пшонка
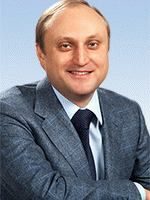
- Official portrait, 2012

People's Deputy of Ukraine
- In office 25 May 2006 – 27 November 2014
- Preceded by: Constituency established (2012)
- Succeeded by: Serhiy Valentyrov (2014)
- Constituency: Party of Regions, No. 128 (2006–2007); Party of Regions, No. 149 (2007–2012); Zaporizhzhia Oblast, No. 81(2012–2014)

Personal details
- Born: 19 March 1979 (age 47) Kramatorsk, Ukraine, Soviet Union
- Party: Party of Regions
- Other political affiliations: Independent

Artem Viktorovych Pshonka (Ukrainian: Артем Вікторович Пшонка; born 19 March 1979) is a Ukrainian politician who served as a People's Deputy of Ukraine from 2006 to 2014. He is a member of the Party of Regions. He is a son of former Prosecutor General of Ukraine Viktor Pshonka, and has been wanted by the Security Service of Ukraine since 15 February 2015.

== Early life and career ==
Artem Pshonka was born in Kramatorsk on 19 March 1979 to his father, Viktor, and his mother, Olha Hennadiyivna Pshonka. Between 1998 and 2005, he was trainee, assistant, senior assistant, and a promoted deputy prosecutor in Kramatorsk. In 1999, he studied at the Donetsk State University, with a specialty in jurisprudence. From July 2005 to April 2006, he was a senior assistant to the prosecutor of Kirovsky District, in Donetsk. In 2006, he studied at the Yaroslav Mudryi National Law University. He defended his Ph.D. thesis on "Disciplinary responsibility of prosecutors".

== Political career ==
Pshonka was an elected People's Deputy of Ukraine during the 2006 Ukrainian parliamentary election in the 5th Ukrainian Verkhovna Rada (parliament) from 25 May 2006 to November 2007, as the 128th candidate on the party list of the Party of Regions. At the time of the elections, he was a senior assistant to the Prosecutor of the Kirovsky District in Donetsk and an independent. He was appointed as a member of the Committee on Combating Organized Crime and Corruption in July 2006, and as Chairman of the Subcommittee on Monitoring the Implementation of Laws by State Authorities to Combat Organized Crime and Corruption.

He was re-elected as a People's Deputy in the 2007 Ukrainian parliamentary election, this time as the 149th candidate on the Party of Regions party list.

In the 2012 Ukrainian parliamentary election, he was nominated as the Party of Regions' candidate in Ukraine's 81st electoral district. According to the results of the voting, he won the election with 65.44% of the vote.

== Sanctions ==
On 5 March 2015, the Council of the European Union approved the blocking of funds dismissed by the Verkhovna Rada of President Viktor Yanukovych, his sons Oleksandr and Vikor Viktorovych, Prime Minister Mykola Azarov and his son Oleksiy, brothers Andriy and Serhiy Klyuyev, which also included his father Viktor and himself, and businessman Serhiy Kurchenko, with a total of 17 former government officials close to former President Yanukovych are suspected of misappropriating budget funds.

On 4 March 2016, the Council of the European Union continued to "freeze" the assets of 16 former high-ranking Ukrainian officials and members of their entourage until March 2017. The sanctions also applied to Pshonka.

== Prosecution ==
On 17 July 2015, the Security Service of Ukraine announced the search of the Pshonka family, which includes Viktor and Artem. Artem is suspected of committing a crime under Part 5 of Art. 191 of the Criminal code of Ukraine, charged with appropriation, waste or possession of property by abuse of office.

On 20 April 2016, Interpol announced its refusal to declare Artem Pshonka internationally wanted.

== Family ==
His mother, Olha Hennadiyivna Pshonka, is a doctor of economics, and the first vice-president of the Donetsk Chamber of Commerce and Industry.

He was married to Olha Mykolayivna Pshonka (born 1977) before they were divorced in 2014. He has two daughters: Maria (born 1998), and Sofia (born 2011).
