= Viktor Pshonka =

Ukrainian lawyer

- Віктор Пшонка; Виктор Пшонка
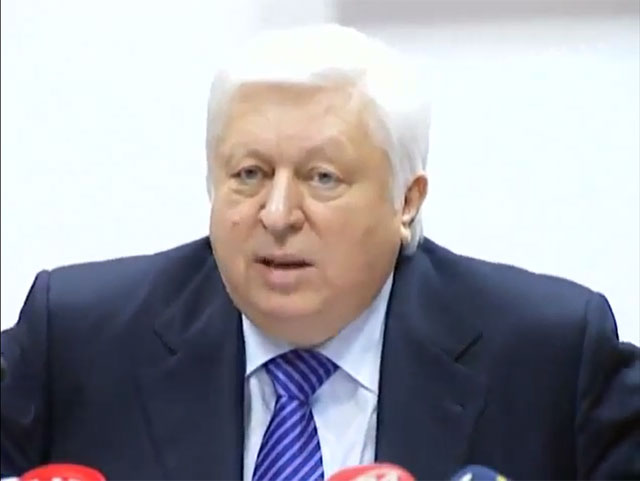
- Pshonka in 2013

11th Prosecutor General of Ukraine
- In office 3 November 2010 – 22 February 2014
- President: Viktor Yanukovych
- Preceded by: Oleksandr Medvedko
- Succeeded by: Oleh Makhnitskyi (as GPU commissar)

Personal details
- Born: Viktor Pavlovych Pshonka; 6 February 1954 (age 72) Serhiivka, Sloviansk Raion, Donetsk Oblast, Ukrainian SSR, Soviet Union (now Ukraine)

Viktor Pavlovych Pshonka (Ukrainian: Віктор Павлович Пшонка, Russian: Виктор Павлович Пшонка, romanized: Viktor Pavlovich Pshonka; born 6 February 1954) is a politician from Ukraine, who served as Prosecutor General of Ukraine from 2010 to 2014. He was also the State Counselor of Justice of Ukraine and member of the High Council of Justice of Ukraine. He holds a Doctor of Laws degree, and is a member of the International Association of Prosecutors.

During his tenure as General Prosecutor, Pshonka focused on modernisation, environmental standards and is noted for starting an investigation into Burisma. He is believed to have fled to Russia, and later taken up its citizenship, following the 2014 Ukrainian Revolution. The new authorities have issued an arrest warrant in his name.

== Early life and education ==
Viktor Pshonka was born on 6 February 1954 in Serhiivka, Slovyansk District of Donetsk Oblast. After graduating from high school he was called up for military service in the Soviet Army. Having discharged from army, he got a job at one of the enterprises in Donetsk Oblast.

In 1975, Viktor Pshonka enrolled at the Kharkiv Law Institute.

== Career ==
In 1980, he began work at Kramatorsk Prosecutor's Office in Donetsk Oblast, where he served as investigator, and eventually as an assistant to prosecutor of the city of Kramatorsk.

From 1986 till 1997, Viktor Pshonka served as prosecutor of Kramatorsk City.

In 1997, he was appointed first deputy prosecutor of Donetsk Oblast.

In 1998–2003, he was prosecutor of Donetsk Oblast, one of the biggest regions in Ukraine.

In November 2003, Viktor P. Pshonka was appointed Deputy Prosecutor General of Ukraine. He was in charge of prosecutor's supervision over observance of laws by the agencies of the Ministry of Interior, the Security Service of Ukraine (SBU), tax police and special units combating organized crime and corruption. He was also responsible for supervision over state customs service and border guard.

He resigned voluntarily from his office in December 2004, but returned to the Prosecutor General's Office of Ukraine at the end of 2006.

In November 2010, members of Ukraine's Parliament voted in favor (292 votes) of Viktor Pshonka's appointment as the General Prosecutor of Ukraine.

=== General Prosecutor of Ukraine ===
Since his appointment to office, Viktor Pshonka has laid emphasis in his activity on bringing Ukrainian prosecution service in line with European standards. Speaking on the Ukrainian TV channel Inter four days after his appointment, Pshonka called himself "a member of President Viktor Yanukovych's team".

In this regard, V. Pshonka takes active part in consultations and discussions on the issues of improving of the work of prosecution service with experts and representatives of European and international organizations, in particular, the United Nations, the Council of Europe, the Venice Commission, etc., as well as exchange of experience with law enforcement authorities of other states.

In accordance with the new Criminal Procedure Code of Ukraine CPC, which entered into force in 2012, the Prosecutor General's Office of Ukraine led by Pshonka introduced the Unified Register of Pretrial Investigations (computerized system, where all complaints and applications regarding criminal offences in Ukraine are registered), which is used by Ukrainian law enforcement agencies.

In November 2012, the Code of Professional Conduct and Ethics for employees of the prosecution service was adopted by all-Ukrainian Conference of Members of prosecuting agencies.

On 3 March 2012, another innovation during Pshonka's tenure was establishment of the Dnipro Ecological Prosecutor's Office, the main task of which is to oversee compliance with environmental laws in respect of drainage basin of the Dnieper River within the territory of Ukraine.

In 2012, Pshonka as the Prosecutor General of Ukraine began investigating Burisma Holdings owner, Mykola Zlochevsky, over allegations of money laundering, tax evasion, and corruption during 2010-2012.

=== Discovery of Ukraine's Watergate papers ===
Together, Viktor Pshonka, Viktor Yanukovych, and Vitaly Zakharchenko became guests on the 11th floor of the Hotel Ukraina in Moscow on 25 February 2014. On 21 February 2014, Yanukovych traveled by helicopter to Kharkiv and then to Donetsk but was denied permission to takeoff from Donetsk, so, he drove to Crimea and then left Crimea for Russia on a Russia government boat. Similarly, on 22 February 2014, Pshonka left the VIP terminal at Donetsk airport for Russia by having his security detachment occupy the Ukraine border guards.

Upon Pshonka's departure, the luxurious Pshonka mansion near Kyiv at Gorenichi, Kyiv-Svyatoshinsky district (Ukrainian: Гореничи, Києво-Святошинський район) was searched and numerous files were discovered. Revealed on 31 May 2016 by Serhiy Anatoliyovich Leshchenko (Ukrainian: Сергій Анатолійович Лещенко), (Note: Another source gave the entire records to Viktor Mykolayovych Trepak (Ukrainian: Віктор Миколайович Трепак), who was the former Deputy Director of the domestic intelligence agency of Ukraine (SBU) as the Chief of the Main Directorate for Combating Corruption and Organized Crime of the Central Administration of the Security Service of Ukraine, and Trepak passed the entire records to the National Anti-Corruption Bureau) the secret bookkeeping of Viktor Yanukovych and the Party of Regions' Black Ledger (Ukrainian: Чорної книги) or Barn Book (Ukrainian: амбарна книга) which implicated numerous persons to improper payments including Paul Manafort for which the book included the handwritten records of 22 payments over five years to Manafort from pro Kremlin and pro Putin sources, nine of which had been signed by Vitaly Anatolyevich Kalyuzhny (Ukrainian: Віталій Анатолійович Калюжний) who was the Verkhovna Rada's foreign relations committee chairman. On 17 August 2016, Donald Trump removed Paul Manafort as Trump's campaign chairman following Trump's first national security briefing directly because of the records in the secret ledger. In September 2016, Leshchenko referred to these papers as Ukraine's Watergate.

=== Criminal prosecution ===
On 22 February 2014, as a part of the Euromaidan Revolution, the Verkhovna Rada ousted Pshonka in a no-confidence vote. On 23 February 2014, an arrest warrant was issued to arrest Pshonka.

But, on 5 December 2015, Interpol denied a request to put former Prosecutor General of Ukraine Viktor Pshonka on the wanted list allegedly due to the weakness of the evidence submitted by the competent authorities of Ukraine.

Early March 2014, the EU froze Pshonka's accounts.

== Controversies ==
=== Murder of Ihor Aleksandrov ===
Ihor Oleksandrovych Aleksandrov who was an investigative reporter and presenter for the independent television station TOR TV (Ukrainian: «ТОР») in Sloviansk (Note: Sloviansk, Ukraine was previously known as Tor, Russia (Russian: Тор, Россия).) was murdered in 2001 while producing a program for the series "Bez Retushi" (Without Touching Up) (Ukrainian: Без ретуші) which was exposing links between politicians, law enforcement, and organized crime in Kramatorsk; Pshonka was one of two men Aleksandrov had identified as godfathering the Kramatorsk underworld. Pshonka then oversaw the investigation of the murder. A homeless man was later charged but acquitted in the case, dying of 'mysterious circumstances' soon after; the same fate that befell the two witnesses and investigating police officer.

=== Missing GPU files ===
In early April 2015, Ukraine Prosecutor General Viktor Shokin stated that the Prosecutor General of Ukraine (GPU) files disappeared about criminal orders from former Prosecutor General Pshonka along with Pshonka's secret casework and secret materials: Viktor Shokin: I will tell you more: not only criminal cases, but secret materials are missing - secret casework. Including, as far as Victor Pshonka's orders were concerned." (Russian: Viktor Shokin: "Я вам больше скажу: пропали не только уголовные дела, но секретные материалы – секретное делопроизводство. В том числе, то, что касалось распоряжений Виктора Пшонки."). During the search for the missing files, the Head of the Special Investigations Division of the General Investigation Department of the GPU, Serhiy Viktorovych Horbatyuk (Ukrainian: Сергій Вікторович Горбатюк), believed that Pshonka had ordered those files and many others to be transferred to Crimea. On 10 April 2015, Mustafa Nayyem stated that he was with members of the Right Sector when they entered Pshonka's mansion and that the Right Sector recovered numerous GPU files from Pshonka's mansion including some items from under the tiles in the Pshonka mansion's sauna. On 15 April 2015, Nayyem recovered missing GPU files about Yulia Tymoshenko in Pechersk's regional department of the Ministry of Internal Affairs, Kyiv. The Tymoshenko files were sent to Pechersk after the Right Sector left the Dnipro Hotel.

== Membership ==
- Member of the International Association of Prosecutors
- Member of the Board of the Prosecutor General’s Office of Ukraine
- Member of the High Council of Justice of Ukraine
- Member of the Working Group on Reforming of Prosecution and Advocacy established by the President of Ukraine (since 22 November 2011)
- Member of the Committee on Reform of Law Enforcement Bodies (by consent) under the President of Ukraine (6 April 2012)
- Member of the Working Group on Reforming of Legislation on Administrative Offenses and Introducing of Concept of Misdemeanors, set up by the President of Ukraine (since 30 May 2012)

== Family and personal life ==
Pshonka's son Artyom Pshonka was a constituency candidate in Zaporizhia for Party of Regions during the 2012 Ukrainian parliamentary election. He was elected into parliament.

After his removal as General Prosecutor of Ukraine media reported in late February 2014 that photos of Pshonka's mansion were "astonishing by their luxury".

When Pshonka and his son Artyom appealed the EU accounts freeze in late May 2014, they both had Russian citizenship, although it was unclear since when. Both Viktor and Artem listed their residences as Moscow with the European Court of Justice. The last time Pshonka appeared in public was during a joint press conference with former President Viktor Yanukovych and former Ukrainian Interior Minister Vitaliy Zakharchenko on 13 April 2014 in the Russian city of Rostov-on-Don.

In the fall of 2014, Pshonka moved his family's jewelry businesses, Gold Standard Jewelry Factory LLC (Ukrainian: ТОВ "Ювелірний завод "Золотий стандарт") and others, from Kramatorsk, Donetsk Oblast, Ukraine, to Sebastopol in Russian annexed Crimea. Russia has illegally occupied Crimea since the Russian invasion of Ukraine beginning March 2014. Pshonka dominated the gold jewelry industry in Kramatorsk which was the third largest production center in Ukraine behind only Kyiv and Kharkiv in production.

== International sanctions ==
For his roles in destabilizing Ukraine, his role in the Victor Yanukovych government, his support for pro-Russia individuals and entities in Ukraine, abuse of office, and embezzlement of public funds, Pshonka is under sanctions by the European Union, Austria, Switzerland, Lichtenstein, and Norway since 28 February 2014. and Canada since 5 March 2014.

For his roles in destabilizing Ukraine, his son, Artem or Artyom, has been under sanctions since early March 2014 by the European Union, Austria, Switzerland, Lichtenstein, and Norway; and since 5 March 2014 by Canada.

In 2022, the European Union did not extend the sanctions against Pshonka and his son. On July 26, 2023, the European General Court annulled the decision to impose sanctions, considering that it was made on the basis of insufficiently solid facts.

== Awards ==
In view of special accomplishments in strengthening of the due course of law in Ukraine, V. Pshonka was awarded a rank of State Counselor of Justice of Ukraine, Honored Jurist of Ukraine and Third Class Order of Merit by the Decrees of the President of Ukraine.

In 2000, he was named Jurist of the Year in the nomination among prosecutors.

In 2002, he was awarded the Certificate of Honor of the Verkhovna Rada of Ukraine.

Viktor Pshonka was awarded lapel badges of the "Honorable Member of Prosecution Service of Ukraine”, “Statehood. Fairness. Honesty” of 2nd Degree.

He also received “Acknowledgement of Honest Service in Prosecution Service of Ukraine” of 1st Degree, as well as awards from the Ukrainian Orthodox Church.
