= Viktor Bondarenko (politician) =

Ukrainian politician (born 1967)

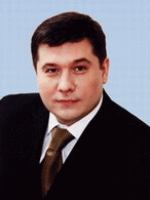
Viktor Bondarenko in 2007

Viktor Viktorovych Bondarenko (Ukrainian: Віктор Вікторович Бондаренко; born 1967) is a Ukrainian politician, member of Party of Regions (since November 2007), a member of the Committee on Agrarian Policy and Land Relations (since December 2007), Chairman of the Subcommittee on economic and financial policies in agriculture (since January 2008).

== Biography ==
Viktor Bondarenko was born on 16 July 1967 in Luhansk. Viktor Bondarenko is married, his wife Elena (born in 1965) is a housewife.

=== Education ===
- 1992 - he graduated from Luhansk Machine-Building Institute, with qualification of accountant and economist
- 2004 - graduated from the European University of Finance, Information Systems, Management and Business, "Economics and Management" faculty, with qualification of economist

=== Career ===
- 1987-1993 - Deputy mine overseer, mine management office No. 5 (Luhansk)
- 1993-1997 - Assistant to the Chairman of the State Committee of Ukraine's coal industry and the Minister of Coal Industry of Ukraine
- 1997-2002 - Director General of "Ukruglepostavsbyt" (Ukraine coal delivery and sales company)
- 2002-2003 - Director General of "Ukrneftegazservis"
- July–December 2003 - chairman of the management board of SJSC "Ukrresursy"
- December 2003-March 2005 - chairman of the company "Bread of Ukraine"
- March 2005-May 2006 - Deputy Director of LLC Holding Company "Ukragroinvest"

=== Verkhovna Rada ===
- May 2006-November 2007 - People's Deputy of the V convocation of Verkhovna Rada of Ukraine from the Party of Regions, No. 81 in the list. Chairman of the Subcommittee on the development of processing industry, food and fishing industries, production and quality of food of the Committee on Agrarian Policy and Land Relations (since July 2006)
- since November 2007 - People's Deputy of the VI convocation of Verkhovna Rada, from the Party of Regions, No. 150 in the list. Member of the Committee on Agrarian Policy and Land Relations (since December 2007), Chairman of the Subcommittee on economic and financial policies in the agricultural sector (since January 2008)
- Member of Verkhovna Rada Committee on Transport and Communications
- Member of the Group for Interparliamentary Relations with United States of America
- Member of the Group for Interparliamentary Relations with the Republic of Korea

In 1990-1992 Viktor Bondarenko was the Deputy of Luhansk City Council. In November 2004 he was awarded with Order of Merit (III class).

== See also ==
- 2007 Ukrainian parliamentary election
- List of Ukrainian Parliament Members 2007
- Party of Regions
