= Volodymyr Ivanenko (politician) =

Ukrainian politician (1955–2024)

- Володимир Іваненко
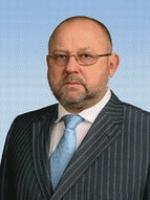
- Ivanenko in 2007

People's Deputy of Ukraine
- In office 23 November 2007 – 12 December 2012

Personal details
- Born: Volodymyr Hryhorovych Ivanenko; 1 January 1955 Khiytola, Karelo-Finnish SSR, USSR
- Died: 18 June 2024 (aged 69)
- Party: Batkivshchyna
- Education: Cherkasy National University
- Occupation: Powerlifter

Volodymyr Hryhorovych Ivanenko (Ukrainian: Волод́имир Григо́рович Іване́нко; 1 January 1955 – 18 June 2024) was a Ukrainian politician. A member of Batkivshchyna, he served in the Verkhovna Rada from 2007 to 2012.

Ivanenko died on 18 June 2024, at the age of 69 from acute leukemia.
