= 5th Ukrainian Verkhovna Rada =

2006-2007 meeting of the Ukrainian Verkhovna Rada

(Ukraine) Verkhovna Rada of Ukraine of the 5th convocation
←	4th Verkhovna Rada	6th Verkhovna Rada	→

Overview
- Meeting place: Verkhovna Rada building
- Term: 25 May 2006 – 23 November 2007
- Election: 2006 parliamentary election
- Website: iportal.rada.gov.ua
- Members: 450 / 450
- Chairman: Oleksandr Moroz (from July 6, 2006; Socialist Party)
- First Deputy: Adam Martyniuk (until Sep. 20, 2007; Communist Party)
- Deputy: Mykola Tomenko (until June 14, 2007; Y. Tymoshenko Bloc)
- Party control: Coalition: PR–KP–SP

Sessions
- 1st: May 2006 – August 2006
- 2nd: September 2006 – January 2007
- 3rd: February 2007 – June 2007
- 4th: September 2007 – October 2007

The Verkhovna Rada of Ukraine of the 5th convocation (Ukrainian: Верховна Рада України V скликання, Verkhovna Rada Ukrayiny V sklykannia) was the convocation of the legislative branch of the Verkhovna Rada, Ukraine's unicameral parliament from May 25, 2006 until November 23, 2007.

The 5th Verkhovna Rada's composition was based upon the results of the inconclusive March 26, 2006 parliamentary election, a little over a year after the conclusion of the Orange Revolution. During the 2007 political crisis, President Viktor Yushchenko dissolved the parliament on April 2, 2007, forcing the subsequent snap election, which would decide the composition of the 6th and next convocation of parliament.

The People's Deputies of Ukraine of the 5th convocation were elected in the snap parliamentary elections on March 26, 2006. The elections were held under the proportional system according to electoral lists of political parties and electoral blocks of political parties in Ukraine. The 5th convocation ended on June 5, 2007 (six weeks after the 2007 parliamentary elections).

According to the results of early elections the following political forces got in the Verkhovna Rada:

- Party of Regions with 32.14% of votes
- Yulia Tymoshenko Bloc, BYuT (Ukrainian: Блок Юлії Тимошенко, БЮТ) with 22.29%
- Our Ukraine Bloc (Ukrainian: Блок Наша Україна, romanized: Blok Nasha Ukrayina, NU) with 13.95%
- Socialist Party of Ukraine (SPU) with 5.69%
- Communist Party of Ukraine (CPU) with 3.66%

Together, these political forces gathered around 88.58% of the votes. All other political parties and blocks do not pass the electoral threshold of 3%. 2,73% of electors voted "against all".

== Members ==
Full name	Elected from	Assignment time
Oleksandr Abdullin	BYuT, No. 074	
Mykola Azarov	Party of Regions, No. 012	
Alla Aleksandrovskaya	CPU, No. 017	
Igor Alekseev	CPU, No. 014	
Serhiy Andros	Party of Regions, No. 179	
Anatoliy Antemiuk	Party of Regions, No. 122	
Iryna Antypenko	Party of Regions, No. 126	
Oleh Antipov	BYuT, No. 32	
Stanislav Arzhevitin	NU, No. 056	
Nurulislam Arkallayev	Party of Regions, No. 072	
Yuriy Artemenko	NU, No. 55	
Rinat Akhmetov	Party of Regions, No. 007	
Aleksey Baburin	CPU, No. 013	
Mykola Bahrayev	BYuT, No. 045	
Oleksandr Baranivsky	SPU, No. 020	
Tetyana Bakhteyeva	Party of Regions, No. 033	
Valeriy Bevzenko	Party of Regions, No. 060	
Roman Bezsmertnyi	NU, No. 023	
Vasyl Bertash	Party of Regions, No. 155	
Borys Bespalyi	NU, No. 15	
Serhiy Bychkov	NU, No. 83	
Vasyl Biba	Party of Regions, No. 178	
Borys Bilash	Party of Regions, No. 207	
Oleksiy Belyi	Party of Regions, No. 031	
Oksana Bilozir	NU, No. 019	
Oleh Bilorus	BYuT, No. 011	
Lev Biryuk	BYuT, No. 111	
Raisa Bohatyryova	Party of Regions, No. 006	
Vasyl Bohachuk	SPU, No. 034	
Nataliya Bohasheva	NU, No. 076	
Vyacheslav Bohuslayev	Party of Regions, No. 005	
Olha Bodnar	BYuT, No. 126	
Volodymyr Boyko	SPU, No. 008	
Ivan Bokyi	SPU, No. 007	
Yuriy Boldyriev	Party of Regions, No. 162	
Oleksandr Bondar	NU, No. 037	
Volodymyr Bondar	Party of Regions, No. 152	
Viktor Bondarenko	Party of Regions, No. 081	
Olena Bondarenko	Party of Regions, No. 125	
Olena Bondarenko	BYuT, No. 089	
Ivan Bondarchuk	SPU, No. 021	
Valeriy Bondik	Party of Regions, No. 101	
Oleksandr Borzykh	BYuT, No. 097	
Valery Borisov	NU, No. 057	
Vitaliy Bort	Party of Regions, No. 105	
Viktor Borschevskiy	CPU, No. 015	
Volodymyr Bronnikov	Party of Regions, No. 114	
Anatoliy Buhayets	SPU, No. 019	
Oleksandr Budzherak	BYuT, No. 098	
Stepan Bulba	SPU, No. 011	
Pavlo Burlakov	Party of Regions, No. 109	
Oleksandr Buryak	BYuT, No. 069	
Serhiy Buryak	BYuT, No. 037	
Tariel Vasadze	BYuT, No. 041	
Oleksandr Vasilyev	Party of Regions, No. 075	
Andriy Verevsky	BYuT, No. 044	
Ivan Vernydubov	Party of Regions, No. 078	
Inha Vershynina	BYuT, No. 063	
Volodymyr Vecherko	Party of Regions, No. 077	
Dmytro Vydrin	BYuT, No. 092	
Oleksandr Vilkul	Party of Regions, No. 059	
Yosyp Vinsky	SPU, No. 006	
Olena Vitenko	BYuT, No. 119	
Vasyl Volha	SPU, No. 017	
Mykhailo Volynets	BYuT, No. 014	
Oleksandr Volkov	NU, No. 044	
Dmytro Voloshenkov	Party of Regions, No. 208	
Yuriy Voropayev	Party of Regions, No. 074	
Ihor Vorotnyuk	BYuT, No. 033	
Volodymyr Vyazivsky	NU, No. 048	
Oleksandr Halunenko	Party of Regions, No. 192	
Halyna Harmash	SPU, No. 016	
Petro Hasyuk	BYuT, No. 052	
Ivan Gerasimov	CPU, No. 003	
Olha Herasymiuk	NU, No. 004	
Hanna Herman	Party of Regions, No. 106	
Yevhen Heller	Party of Regions, No. 079	
Yevhen Hirnyk	NU, No. 030	
Mykhailo Hladiy	BYuT, No. 085	
Stepan Hlus	BYuT, No. 108	
Lev Hnatenko	NU, No. 052	
Yuriy Hnatkevych	BYuT, No. 135	
Serhiy Holovatyi	NU, No. 043	
Aleksander Golub'	CPU, No. 007	
Mykhailo Honcharov	SPU, No. 015	
Vasyl Horbal	Party of Regions, No. 037	
Anatoliy Horbatiuk	Party of Regions, No. 156	
Nataliya Horbenko	Party of Regions, No. 209	
Oleksandr Horoshkevych	NU, No. 058	
Leonid Grach	CPU, No. 019	
Liliya Hryhorovych	NUNS, No. 010	
Vasyl Hrytsak	Party of Regions, No. 165	
Bohdan Hubskyi	BYuT, No. 027	
Ihor Humenyuk	Party of Regions, No. 051	
Oleh Humenyuk	NU, No. 067	
Vasyl Hureyev	NU, No. 036	
Serhiy Husarov	Party of Regions, No. 160	
Stepan Davimuka	NU, No. 081	
Mykola Danilin	SPU, No. 032	
Oleksiy Danilov	BYuT, No. 042	
Oleksandr Darda	Party of Regions, No. 089	
Borys Deich	Party of Regions, No. 028	
Volodymyr Demidko	Party of Regions, No. 201	
Vasyl Demchyshen	Party of Regions, No. 197	
Mykola Demyanko	Party of Regions, No. 093	
Lyudmila Denisova	BYuT, No. 115	
Vasyl Derevlyany	BYuT, No. 038	
Andriy Derkach	Socialist Party of Ukraine, No. 009	
Vasyl Dzharty	Party of Regions, No. 022	
Mustafa Dzhemilev	NU, No. 045	
Mykola Dzhyha	Party of Regions, No. 056	
Stanislav Dovhyi	NU, No. 028	
Taras Dovhyi	NU, No. 064	
Volodymyr Donchak	BYuT, No. 122	
Vasyl Yevtukhov	Party of Regions, No. 141	
Tamara Yehorenko	Party of Regions, No. 203	
Oleksandr Yedin	BYuT, No. 068	
Ihor Yeresko	BYuT, No. 118	
Oleksandr Yefremov	Party of Regions, No. 019	
Yuriy Yekhanurov	NU, No. 001	
Davyd Zhvaniya	NU, No. 069	
Pavlo Zhebrivskiy	NU, No. 049	
Kostyantyn Zhevaho	BYuT, No. 062	
Ihor Zhydenko	BYuT, No. 130	
Oleksiy Zhuravko	Party of Regions, No. 118	
Vladyslav Zabarskyi	Party of Regions, No. 176	
Roman Zabzalyuk	BYuT, No. 049	
Vitaliy Zablotskyi	Party of Regions, No. 166	
Valeriya Zaklunna-Mironenko	CPU, No. 006	
Mykola Zamkovenko	BYuT, No. 125	
Volodymyr Zaplatynskyi	NU, No. 060	
Tetyana Zasukha	Party of Regions, No. 117	
Oleksandr Zats	Party of Regions, No. 187	
Ihor Zvarych	Party of Regions, No. 174	
Roman Zvarych	NU, No. 026	
Yukhym Zvyahilsky	Party of Regions, No. 009	
Eduard Zeinalov	NU, No. 065	
Yevhen Zimin	BYuT, No. 121	
Mykola Zlochevskiy	Party of Regions, No. 110	
Ruslan Zozulya	BYuT, No. 093	
Volodymyr Zubanov	Party of Regions, No. 138	
Mykhailo Zubets	BYuT, No. 059	
Volodymyr Zubyk	BYuT, No. 064	
Yuriy Zubko	SPU, No. 036	
Valentyn Zubov	BYuT, No. 019	
Volodymyr Ivanov	Party of Regions, No. 185	
Oleksiy Ivchenko	NU, No. 025	
Hryhoriy Ilyashov	Party of Regions, No. 127	
Leonid Isayev	Party of Regions, No. 131	
Oleh Kalashnikov	Party of Regions, No. 161	
Hryhoriy Kaletnik	Party of Regions, No. 142	
Ihor Kalnichenko	Party of Regions, No. 107	
Serhiy Kaltsev	Party of Regions, No. 190	
Valeriy Kalchenko	BYuT, No. 028	
Vitaliy Kalyuzhny	Party of Regions, No. 168	
Valeriy Kamchatny	BYuT, No. 123	
Yuriy Karakai	Party of Regions, No. 164	
Nina Karpachova	Party of Regions, No. 002	
Volodymyr Karpuk	NU, No. 073	
Oleksandr Kasianiuk	Party of Regions, No. 210	
Mykola Katerynchuk	NU, No. 008	
Valeriy Kelestyn	NU, No. 050	
Oleksandr Kemenyash	BYuT, No. 067	
Yaroslav Kendzor	NU, No. 059	
Serhiy Kyi	Party of Regions, No. 070	
Vyacheslav Kyrylenko	NU, No. 006	
Ivan Kyrylenko	BYuT, No. 070	
Yevhen Kyrylchuk	BYuT, No. 020	
Lyudmyla Kyrychenko	Party of Regions, No. 046	
Vasyl Kiselyov	Party of Regions, No. 034	
Serhiy Kivalov	Party of Regions, No. 027	
Spiridon Kilinkarov	CPU, No. 013	
Anatoliy Kinakh	NU, No. 002	
Yuriy Kichatyi	Party of Regions, No. 205	
Pavlo Klymets	Party of Regions, No. 067	
Leonid Klimov	Party of Regions, No. 039	
Andriy Klyuev	Party of Regions, No. 014	
Serhiy Klyuyev	Party of Regions, No. 062	
Yuriy Klyuchkovsky	NU, No. 016	
Ruslan Knyazevich	NU, No. 009	
Yulia Kovalevska	Party of Regions, No. 167	
Vyacheslav Koval	NU, No. 024	
Yulia Kovalyova	Party of Regions, No. 119	
Mykola Kovzel	BYuT, No. 053	
Oleksandr Kovtunenko	BYuT, No. 116	
Leonid Kozhara	Party of Regions, No. 139	
Andriy Kozhemiakin	BYuT, No. 025	
Volodymyr Kozak	Party of Regions, No. 092	
Ihor Kozakov	Party of Regions, No. 145	
Oleksiy Kozachenko	NU, No. 085	
Oleksandr Kozub	Party of Regions, No. 183	
Borys Kolesnikov	Party of Regions, No. 010	
Vadym Kolesnichenko	Party of Regions, No. 180	
Yuriy Kolotsey	Party of Regions, No. 052	
Mykola Komar	Party of Regions, No. 115	
Tetiana Kondratyeva	Party of Regions, No. 171	
Yevhen Konstantynov	BYuT, No. 124	
Viktor Korzh	Party of Regions, No. 172	
Vitaliy Korzh	BYuT, No. 034	
Pavlo Korzh	Party of Regions, No. 061	
Anatoliy Korzhev	Party of Regions, No. 071	
Yevhen Korniychuk	BYuT, No. 113	
Natalia Korolevska	BYuT, No. 079	
Viktor Korol	NU, No. 054	
Oleksiy Korsakov	Party of Regions, No. 116	
Pavlo Kostenko	BYuT, No. 072	
Bohdan Kostyniuk	NU, No. 088	
Oleksiy Kostusyev	Party of Regions, No. 029	
Oleksandr Kravtsov	Party of Regions, No. 170	
Nikolay Kravchenko	CPU, No. 011	
Petro Kravchuk	BYuT, No. 083	
Ihor Kril	NU, No. 071	
Mykola Kruhlov	Party of Regions, No. 040	
Yuriy Kruk	BYuT, No. 077	
Mykola Kruts	NU, No. 079	
Dmytro Kryuchkov	BYuT, No. 071	
Petro Kuzmenko	BYuT, No. 100	
Serhiy Kuzmenko	SPU, No. 031	
Vasyl Kuybida	NU, No. 017	
Anatoliy Kukoba	Party of Regions, No. 098	
Mykola Kulchynsky	NU, No. 087	
Oleksiy Kunchenko	SPU, No. 013	
Volodymyr Kurennoy	BYuT, No. 095	
Vitaliy Kurylo	BYuT, No. 008	
Ivan Kurovsky	BYuT, No. 065	
Stepan Kurpil	BYuT, No. 036	
Oleksiy Kucherenko	NU, No. 047	
Yevhen Kushnaryov	Party of Regions, No. 011	
Anzhelika Labunska	BYuT, No. 088	
Valentyn Landyk	Party of Regions, No. 018	
Volodymyr Landik	Party of Regions, No. 054	
Volodymyr Lanovyi	NU, No. 039	
Yevhen Lapin	Party of Regions, No. 135	
Serhiy Larin	Party of Regions, No. 065	
Pavlo Lebedyev	BYuT, No. 073	
Volodymyr Levtsun	BYuT, No. 024	
Kateryna Levchenko	NU, No. 035	
Oleksandr Ledyda	Party of Regions, No. 149	
Oleksiy Lelyuk	Party of Regions, No. 091	
Viktor Leshchenko	NU, No. 086	
Oleksandr Leshchynskyi	Party of Regions, No. 191	
Oleksandr Lieshchynskyi	Party of Regions, No. 053	
Ruslana Lezhychko	NU, No. 005	
Ihor Lysov	Party of Regions, No. 097	
Leonid Lytvynov	Party of Regions, No. 016	
Volodymyr Lychuk	Party of Regions, No. 158	
Mykola Lisin	Party of Regions, No. 108	
Volodymyr Litvinov	Party of Regions, No. 200	
Oleksiy Lohvynenko	BYuT, No. 058	
Andriy Lopushanskyi	NU, No. 070	
Olena Lukash	Party of Regions, No. 026	
Oleh Lukashuk	BYuT, No. 114	
Levko Lukyanenko	BYuT, No. 006	
Vladyslav Lukyanov	Party of Regions, No. 133	
Ruslan Lukyanchuk	BYuT, No. 056	
Maksym Lutskyi	BYuT, No. 048	
Kseniya Lyapina	NU, No. 007	
Oleh Liashko	BYuT, No. 026	
Serhiy Maiboroda	Party of Regions, No. 184	
Vitaliy Maiko	NU, No. 020	
Volodymyr Makeyenko	Party of Regions, No. 048	
Volodymyr Makiyenko	BYuT, No. 076	
Oleksiy Malynovskyi	SPU, No. 010	
Volodymyr Malyshev	Party of Regions, No. 064	
Volodymyr Maltsev	Party of Regions, No. 066	
Hryhoriy Mankovsky	Party of Regions, No. 146	
Yevgeny Marmazov	CPU, No. 016	
Mykola Martynenko	NU, No. 021	
Adam Martynyuk	CPU, No. 002	
Volodymyr Marushchenko	NU, No. 038	
Valentin Matveev	CPU, No. 008	
Anatoliy Matviyenko	NU, No. 012	
Serhiy Matviyenkov	SPU, No. 025	
Eduard Matviychuk	Party of Regions, No. 102	
Valeriy Matiukha	Party of Regions, No. 177	
Petro Melnyk	Party of Regions, No. 143	
Stanislav Melnyk	Party of Regions, No. 084	
Mykhailo Melnychuk	Socialist Party of Ukraine, No. 038	
Yaroslav Mendus	Socialist Party of Ukraine, No. 018	
Mykhailo Myronenko	Party of Regions, No. 124	
Yuriy Miroshnychenko	Party of Regions, No. 123	
Ihor Mitroshkin	Party of Regions, No. 195	
Serhiy Mishchenko	BYuT, No. 057	
Volodymyr Moisyk	NU, No. 046	
Serhiy Momot	Party of Regions, No. 057	
Leonid Mordovets	SPU, No. 024	
Oleksandr Moroz	SPU, No. 001	
Ulyana Mostipan	BYuT, No. 029	
Orest Muts	Party of Regions, No. 159	
Oleh Nadosha	BYuT, No. 103	
Volodymyr Nakonechny	Party of Regions, No. 134	
Anatoliy Nalivaiko	CPU, No. 012	
Hryhoriy Nemyria	BYuT, No. 046	
Olena Netetska	Party of Regions, No. 169	
Stanislav Nikolayenko	SPU, No. 003	
Mykola Odainyk	NU, No. 053	
Yuriy Odarchenko	BYuT, No. 128	
Volodymyr Oliynyk	BYuT, No. 030	
Svyatoslav Oliynyk	BYuT, No. 086	
Hryhoriy Omelchenko	BYuT, No. 007	
Oleksandr Omelchenko	NU, No. 061	
Mykola Onishchuk	NU, No. 013	
Vasyl Onopenko	BYuT, No. 004	
Vladimir Oplachko	CPU, No. 020	
Andriy Orlov	Party of Regions, No. 087	
Yuriy Orobets	NU, No. 018	
Serhiy Osyka	BYuT, No. 051	
Eduard Pavlenko	Party of Regions, No. 050	
Yuriy Pavlenko	NU, No. 022	
Oleh Panasovskyi	Party of Regions, No. 120	
Omelyan Parubok	CPU, No. 005	
Serhiy Pochesiuk	Party of Regions, No. 150	
Serhiy Pashynsky	BYuT, No. 101	
Oleksandr Peklushenko	Party of Regions, No. 044	
Vadym Petrenko	BYuT, No. 040	
Petro Petryk	Party of Regions, No. 202	
Borys Petrov	Party of Regions, No. 036	
Valeriy Petrosov	Party of Regions, No. 163	
Mykola Petruk	BYuT, No. 009	
Vyacheslav Perederiy	BYuT, No. 102	
Volodymyr Piekhota	Party of Regions, No. 130	
Valeriy Pysarenko	BYuT, No. 075	
Petro Pysarchuk	Party of Regions, No. 132	
Andriy Pinchuk	Party of Regions, No. 188	
Svyatoslav Piskun	Party of Regions, No. 096	
Oleskiy Plotnikov	Party of Regions, No. 113	
Mykhailo Pozhyvanov	NU, No. 074	
Serhiy Polishchuk	BYuT, No. 117	
Volodymyr Polokhalo	BYuT, No. 050	
Vasyl Polyakov	SPU, No. 030	
Mykhailo Polyanchych	NU, No. 042	
Volodymyr Polyachenko	NU, No. 032	
Georgiy Ponomarenko	CPU, No. 018	
Ivan Popesku	Party of Regions, No. 173	
Petro Poroshenko	NU, No. 033	
Andriy Portnov	BYuT, No. 066	
Vasyl Potapov	Party of Regions, No. 030	
Serhiy Potimkov	BYuT, No. 109	
Ihor Prasolov	Party of Regions, No. 043	
Anton Pryhodsky	Party of Regions, No. 021	
Mykola Prysyazhnyuk	Party of Regions, No. 099	
Dmytro Prytyka	Party of Regions, No. 068	
Viktor Prokopenko	Party of Regions, No. 045	
Nataliya Prokopovych	NU, No. 027	
Eduard Prutnik	Party of Regions, No. 055	
Artem Pshonka	Party of Regions, No. 128	
Oleksiy Radziyevskyi	Party of Regions, No. 157	
Oleh Radkovsky	BYuT, No. 110	
Arnold Radovets	BYuT, No. 131	
Mykhailo Razhoniayev	Party of Regions, No. 198	
Volodymyr Rybak	Party of Regions, No. 013	
Ihor Rybakov	BYuT, No. 078	
Serhiy Ryzhuk	Party of Regions, No. 189	
Oleksandr Rymaruk	Party of Regions, No. 111	
Mykola Romaniuk	Party of Regions, No. 148	
Anatoliy Rudnik	Party of Regions, No. 194	
Mykola Rudkovskyi	SPU, No. 014	
Anton Ruzhytskyi	NU, No. 063	
Oleksandr Riabeka	BYuT, No. 127	
Hennadiy Savosin	SPU, No. 035	
Oleksandr Savchuk	Party of Regions, No. 032	
Mykola Sadovyi	SPU, No. 023	
Dmytro Salamatin	Party of Regions, No. 088	
Yuriy Samoylenko	Party of Regions, No. 058	
Yekaterina Samoylik	CPU, No. 004	
Hennadiy Samofalov	Party of Regions, No. 100	
Dmytro Sandler	Party of Regions, No. 082	
Serhiy Sas	BYuT, No. 017	
Ravil Safiullin	Party of Regions, No. 041	
Dmytro Svyatash	Party of Regions, No. 063	
Andriy Selivarov	Party of Regions, No. 083	
Valentyna Semenyuk	SPU, No. 002	
Anatoliy Semynoha	BYuT, No. 015	
Andriy Senchenko	BYuT, No. 081	
Yuriy Serbin	BYuT, No. 096	
Mykola Syvulsky	BYuT, No. 099	
Petro Symonenko	CPU, No. 001	
Artem Synytsia	Party of Regions, No. 136	
Volodymyr Sivkovych	Party of Regions, No. 080	
Yevhen Sihal	BYuT, No. 047	
Ivan Sidelnyk	BYuT, No. 054	
Vasyl Silchenko	SPU, No. 022	
Serhiy Sinchenko	BYuT, No. 106	
Oleksandr Skybinetskiy	BYuT, No. 061	
Stanislav Skubashevsky	Party of Regions, No. 095	
Volodymyr Skubenko	BYuT, No. 104	
Heorhiy Skudar	Party of Regions, No. 003	
Viktor Slauta	Party of Regions, No. 086	
Volodymyr Slobodianiuk	Party of Regions, No. 154	
Hryhoriy Smityukh	Party of Regions, No. 094	
Mykola Sokyrko	NU, No. 075	
Andriy Sokil	Party of Regions, No. 204	
Pavlo Solus	Party of Regions, No. 206	
Ivan Spodarenko	SPU, No. 004	
Lyubov Stasiv	BYuT, No. 112	
Stanislav Stashevskyi	NU, No. 082	
Oleksandr Stoyan	Party of Regions, No. 023	
Volodymyr Stretovich	NU, No. 011	
Pavlo Sulkovsky	Party of Regions, No. 047	
Yevheniy Suslov	BYuT, No. 010	
Yaroslav Sukhyi	Party of Regions, No. 069	
Valeriy Sushkevich	BYuT, No. 039	
Yakiv Tabachnik	Party of Regions, No. 020	
Leonid Taniuk	NU, No. 014	
Viktor Taran-Teren	BYuT, No. 018	
Volodymyr Tarasov	SPU, No. 027	
Borys Tarasyuk	NU, No. 003	
Elbrus Tedeyev	Party of Regions, No. 103	
Serhiy Teryokhin	BYuT, No. 016	
Yulia Tymoshenko	BYuT, No. 001	
Viktor Tykhonov	Party of Regions, No. 008	
Volodymyr Tkachenko	BYuT, No. 090	
Aleksandr Tkachenko	CPU, No. 008	
Volodymyr Tolstenko	BYuT, No. 080	
Mykola Tomenko	BYuT, No. 003	
Viktor Topolov	NU, No. 077	
Oleksandr Tretyakov	NU, No. 041	
Yuriy Tryndyuk	BYuT, No. 084	
Serhiy Tulub	Party of Regions, No. 049	
Viktor Turmanov	Party of Regions, No. 025	
Oleksandr Turchynov	BYuT, No. 02	
Hennadiy Udovenko	NU, No. 031	
Ihor Urbanskyi	SPU, No. 037	
Volodymyr Falko	Party of Regions, No. 196	
Yaroslav Fedorchuk	BYuT, No. 012	
Oleksiy Fedun	NU, No. 066	
Oleksandr Feldman	BYuT, No. 43	
Leonid Fesenko	Party of Regions, No. 137	
Yevhen Filindash	SPU, No. 029	
Vasyl Khara	Party of Regions, No. 024	
Vasyl Khmelnytskyi	BYuT, No. 060	
Vitaliy Khomutynnik	Party of Regions, No. 015	
Stepan Tsapiuk	Party of Regions, No. 147	
Oleh Tsaryov	Party of Regions, No. 035	
Petr Tsybenko	CPU, No. 010	
Vasyl Tsushko	SPU, No. 012	
Petro Tsiurko	Party of Regions, No. 186	
Vitaliy Chepinoha	BYuT, No. 087	
Serhiy Chervonopyskyi	SPU, No. 005	
Oleksandr Chernomorov	Party of Regions, No. 144	
Yuriy Chertkov	Party of Regions, No. 085	
Mykhailo Chechetov	Party of Regions, No. 135	
Valeriy Chychykov	BYuT, No. 023	
Yuriy Chmyr	Party of Regions, No. 181	
Serhiy Chmyr	SPU, No. 033	
Taras Chornovil	Party of Regions, No. 004	
Oleksandr Chornovolenko	NU, No. 051	
Refat Chubarov	NU, No. 072	
Vitaliy Chudnovsky	BYuT, No. 105	
Serhiy Chukmasov	SPU, No. 026	
Yevhen Shaho	BYuT, No. 094	
Valeriy Shamanov	BYuT, No. 091	
Viktor Shvets	BYuT, No. 031	
Andriy Shevchenko	BYuT, No. 005	
Serhiy Shevchuk	BYuT, No. 021	
Dmytro Shentsev	Party of Regions, No. 129	
Oleksandr Shepelev	BYuT, No. 055	
Vitaliy Shybko	SPU, No. 028	
Zoya Shyshkina	BYuT, No. 082	
Andriy Shkil	BYuT, No. 013	
Ihor Shkira	Party of Regions, No. 211	
Ihor Shkirya	Party of Regions, No. 038	
Volodymyr Shkliar	NU, No. 084	
Anatoliy Shkribliak	NU, No. 078	
Zinoviy Shkutyak	NU, No. 080	
Dmytro Shlemko	BYuT, No. 035	
Fedir Shpyh	NU, No. 034	
Olena Shustik	BYuT, No. 132	
Artem Shcherban	Party of Regions, No. 140	
Petro Yushchenko	NU, No. 040	
Volodymyr Yavorivsky	BYuT, No. 022	
Vasyl Yadukha	Party of Regions, No. 153	
Mykola Yakymenko	Party of Regions, No. 199	
Mykola Yakovyna	NU, No. 062	
Mykola Yankovsky	Party of Regions, No. 017	
Viktor Yanukovich	Party of Regions, No. 090	
Viktor Yanukovych	Party of Regions, No. 001	
Volodymyr Yaroshchuk	Party of Regions, No. 073	

== See also ==
- Second Yanukovych Government
