= Petro Pysarchuk =

Ukrainian politician and entrepreneur

- Петро Писарчук
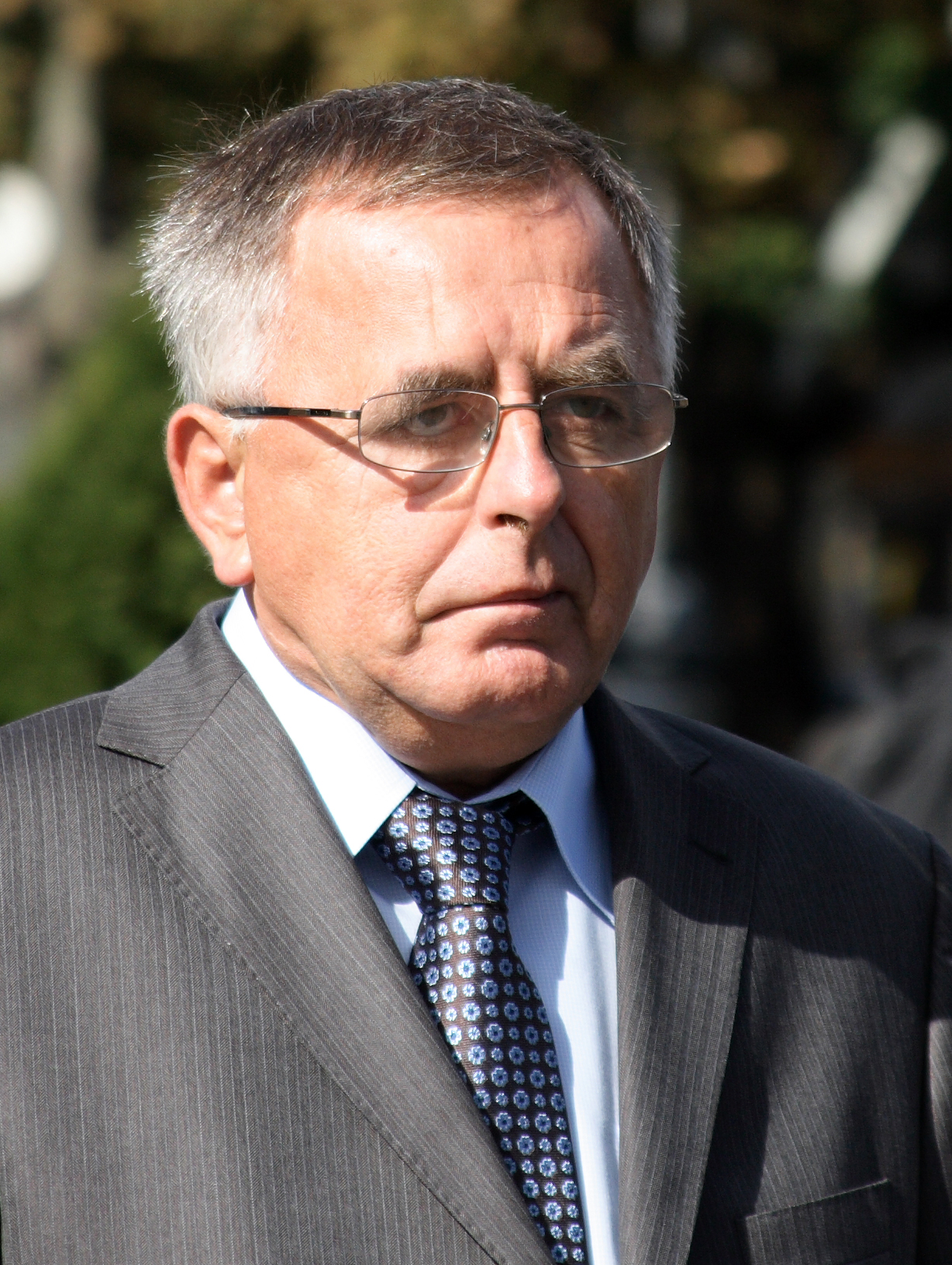
- Pysarchuk in 2009

People's Deputy of Ukraine
- In office 14 May 2002 – 12 December 2012
- Preceded by: Ihor Pylypchuk (2002)
- Succeeded by: Constituency abolished (2006)
- Constituency: Lviv Oblast, No. 124 (2002–2006); Party of Regions, No. 132 (2006–2007); Party of Regions, No. 152 (2007–2012)

Personal details
- Born: 6 June 1955 (age 71) Chemeryntsi, Ukrainian SSR, Soviet Union (now Ukraine)
- Party: Party of Regions
- Other political affiliations: Communist Party of the Soviet Union (until 1991); SDPU(o) (2002–2004)
- Spouse: Oksana Pavlivna (1980)
- Children: 3
- Education: Lviv Polytechnic
- Website: www.pysarchuk.org

Petro Ivanovych Pysarchuk (Ukrainian: Петро Іванович Писарчук; born 6 June 1955) is a Ukrainian politician and entrepreneur who served as a People's Deputy of Ukraine from 2002 to 2012, first from Ukraine's 124th electoral district in Lviv Oblast and later from the proportional list of the Party of Regions.

== Professional career ==
Pysarchuk graduated from Lviv Polytechnic in 1977, with a specialty in heat and power engineering. From 1977, he was the Secretary of Komsomol Committee at the Lviv Railway Station's Railway Carriage Repair Depot. From 1979 to 1984, he worked as a Komsomol official. In 1984, he became the deputy principal of staff for the construction of the Kachinskaja, Achinsk, fuel energy complex, Krasnoyarsk Krai. In November 1986, he became deputy machine shop manager, and in 1987, the machine shop manager, at the Lviv Insulator Plant. From 1989 to 1990, he worked mainly in the Communist Party, becoming involved as a full-time associate. In late 1990, he became the chief engineer and vice president of the Joint Stock Company, Galychyna, and became the CEO of the small enterprise Lavaz. From 1993 to 2002, he was the general manager of AJPIE-L Co. Ltd. He founded the trade-manufacturing enterprise Pivdennyj Market, later turning it into the largest trade complex of the city of Lviv. In 2000, there was an attempt to assassinate him, but he survived. In 2008, he became an owner of two of Lviv's newspapers, Ukraina I Chas and Informator.

== Political career ==
From May 2002, Pysarchuk served as a People's Deputy of Ukraine in the 4th Ukrainian Verkhovna Rada (parliament), representing Ukraine's 124th electoral district in Lviv Oblast. Pysarchuk won in the district with 46% of the vote, defeating six competitors. He was a member of the Social Democratic Party of Ukraine (united) until December 2004, when he defected to the Regions of Ukraine faction. He was a member of the committees on Economic Policy, National Economic Management, and Property and Investment from June 2002.

Pysarchuk was elected to the 5th Ukrainian Verkhovna Rada in April 2006 as a member of the Party of Regions. He placed 132nd on the party's proportional list. He served as a member of the committees on Government Construction, Regional Policy, and Local Self-Government. A year later, he was elected into the 6th Ukrainian Verkhovna Rada from the Party of Regions, this time as the 154th candidate on the party's proportional list. He served as a member of the Verkhovna Rada Budget Committee.

== Awards ==
- Letter of Commendation, granted by Cabinet Council of Ukraine

== Family ==
Pysarchuk come from a peasant family. He is married to Oksana Pavlivna and has three children.

== See also ==
- Party of Regions
- Pivdennyj Market, Lviv (UKR)
- Pivdennyj (Juzhnyj) Market, Lvov (RUS)
