= Oleksandr Leshchynskyi =

Oleksandr Leshchynskyi may refer to:

- Oleksandr Leshchynskyi (businessman) (born 1964), Ukrainian oligarch and politician, founder of the Lauffer Group
- Oleksandr Leshchynskyi (politician) (born 1939), Ukrainian politician, People's Deputy of Ukraine from 2006 to 2007
