= Oleksandr Zats =

Ukrainian politician

- Олександр Зац
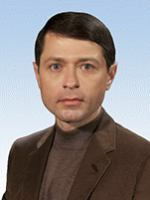

Member of the Verkhovna Rada

5th convocation
- In office 25 May 2006 – 27 November 2014

Personal details
- Born: 8 September 1976 (age 49) Donetsk, Ukrainian SSR, Soviet Union
- Party: Party of Regions

Oleksandr Viktorovych Zats (Ukrainian: Олександр Вікторович Зац; born 8 September 1976) is a Ukrainian politician, People's Deputy of Ukraine of the 5th, 6th and 7th convocations and a member of the Party of Regions.

== Early life ==
Zats was born on 8 September 1976 in the city of Donetsk, which was then part of the Ukrainian SSR in the Soviet Union. In 1998, he graduated from Donetsk State University with a specialty as a mining engineer-mechanics. After graduation, he worked as a manager at ZAO VO "Kyiv-Conti", later becoming the Director of Technology Development there. In 1999, however, he left to become a leading specialist for the Executive Office of the Donetsk Oblast Council. From 2001 to 2002 he was Deputy Head of the Secretariat for the Executive Office of the council.

== Political career ==
In 2002, he was elected Deputy Chairman of thee Donetsk Oblast Council. During the 2006 Ukrainian parliamentary election, he was elected as a People's Deputy of Ukraine in the Verkhovna Rada. He was re-elected for 3 terms as part of the party lisit, going from no. 193 to no. 77 on the list during the subsequent elections. On 16 January 2014, he voted in favor of the Anti-protest laws in Ukraine, which are also collectively called the "laws on dictatorship" for its restriction of freedom of speech during the events of Euromaidan.

After the Russian invasion of Ukraine in 2022, he applied for volunteer status to use the Shlyakh systems to deliver humanitarian aid, which was approved by the Kherson Oblast Military Administration in June 2022. On 27 June 2022, Zats, working as part of the NGO "Ukrainian National‑Patriotic Youth", crossed the border into Hungary and did not return to Ukraine.
