= Oleksandr Riabeka =

Ukrainian politician (1959–2026)

- Олександр Рябека
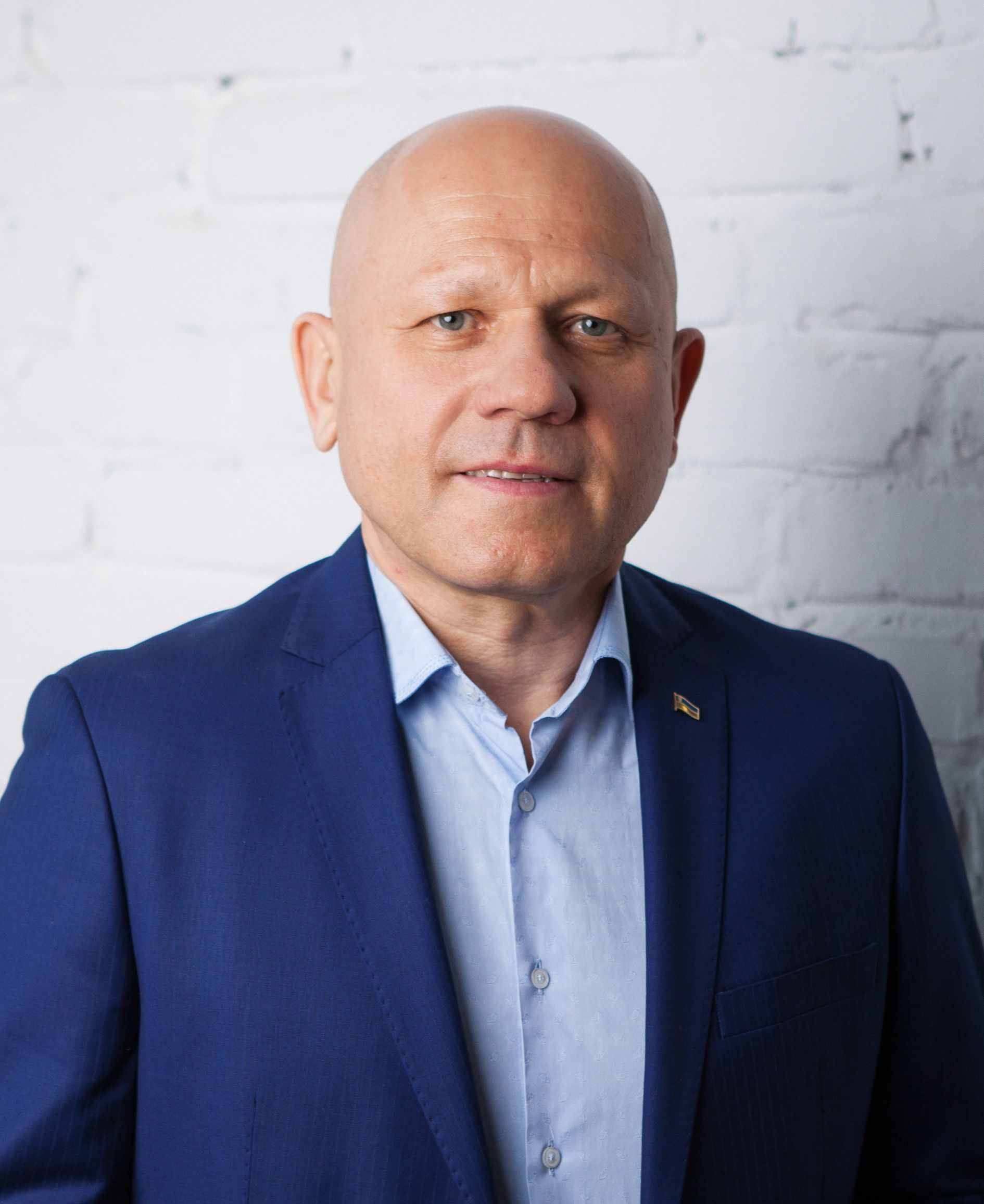
- Riabeka in 2017

Personal details
- Born: 6 November 1959 Ovruch, Zhytomyr Oblast, Ukrainian SSR, Soviet Union
- Died: 21 June 2026 (aged 66)
- Party: All-Ukrainian Union "Fatherland"
- Education: National Pedagogical Dragomanov University

Oleksandr Hryhorovych Riabeka (Ukrainian: Олександр Григорович Рябека; 6 November 1959 – 21 June 2026) was a Ukrainian politician who was a People's Deputy of Ukraine of the V and VI convocations. He died on 21 June 2026, at the age of 66.

== Education ==
- 1976 – Secondary School No. 2 in Ovruch.
- 1980 – Kamianets-Podilskyi Higher Military Engineering Command School on specialty mechanic engineer.
- 1985 – High Secret Service Courses.
- 1991 – High School of State Security Bodies.
- 2011 – presented a thesis and got the degree of PhD of Technical Science at the National Pedagogical Dragomanov University
- 2017 – presented a thesis and got the degree of Doctor of Philosophy at the National Pedagogical Dragomanov University

== Career ==
- 1976–1984 – served in the army at Carpathian Military District and Belorussian Military District.
- 1984–1996 – worked at Security Service of Ukraine, including at Zabaikalsky Military District.
- 1995–1996 – fulfilled special tasks as a member of peace-keepers at the former Yugoslavia republics. Military rank – a colonel.
- 2006–2012 – People's Deputy of Ukraine of the Vth, VIth convocations. A member of the deputies faction "Yulia Tymoshenko Bloc – «Fatherland». A chairman of subcommittee on issues of legislative support of anticorruption policy and control of people’s rights respect, cooperation with social and other organizations of the Verkhovna Rada of Ukraine Committee on issues of the organized crime and corruption.
- 2008–2010 – advisor to Prime Minister of Ukraine on social grounds.
- 2012–2014 – non-payroll advisor of vice-chairman of the Verkhovna Rada of Ukraine.
- From October 2012 – a teacher, since September 2013 – PhD, professor of the Department of Management, information-analytical activity and European integration at the National Pedagogical Dragomanov University
- 2016–2026 – a law company co-incorporator ООО «International Company» "VIP Consulting".

== Social and political activity ==
- From 2002 – Chairman of All-Ukrainian Social Organization "Association «Chernobyl»’s Afghan War veterans” .
- From 1993 – a member of central council of All-Ukrainian Social Organization «Chernobyl Union of Ukraine».
- From 2006 – a member of All-Ukrainian Union "Fatherland".
- 2013–2015 – a member Central Control and Revision Commission of All-Ukrainian Union "Fatherland".
- From 2012 to 2016 – counselor of the chairman of the board of directors, the chairman of the board of directors of All-Ukrainian Social Organization «All-Ukrainian Special Body on issues of the organized crime and corruption fight».
- From 2013 – a member of the Global Organization of Parliamentarians Against Corruption (GOPAC).
- From 2016 – a member of the board of directors Chernobyl Association of Ukraine's people's deputies.

== Honorary degrees ==
- From 2005 – Honoured President of All-Ukrainian Social Organization "All-Ukraine Federation «SPAS».

A participant

- Accident management at Chernobyl Nuclear plant and war action.

== Family ==
Mother: Eva Rafailivna (born 1934) — a pensioner. Wife: Riabeka Evheniya Oleksandrivna (born 1983), a lawyer, Legal Adviser to the Commander-in-Chief of the Armed Forces of Ukraine, Candidate of Philosophical Sciences(PhD). Sons: Serhiy (born 1982), Pavlo (born 1984), Lev (born 2010), Olexandr (born 2017). Daughter: Mariya (born 2006)

== Honours ==
- The Order of Merit (Ukraine) the 2nd class (23 June 2009), the 3rd class (22 April 2004)
- Defender of the Motherland Medal (1999).
- Medal "For Battle Merit" (USSR, 1981).
- Honour «Award Weapon» (2001)
- Recognition Certificate of the Verkhovna Rada of Ukraine (2004).
- Recognition Certificate of the Cabinet of Ministers of Ukraine(2009).
