= Serhiy Kaltsev =

Ukrainian politician

- Сергій Кальцев
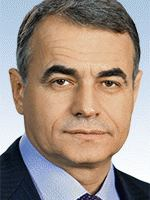
- Official portrait, 2012

Member of the Verkhovna Rada
- In office 12 December 2012 – 27 November 2014

Member of the Zaporizhzhia Oblast Council
- In office October 2010 – 12 December 2012

Member of the Verkhovna Rada
- In office 25 May 2006 – 23 November 2007

Personal details
- Born: Serhiy Fedorovych Kaltsev; 20 April 1960 (age 66) Berdiansk, Ukrainian SSR, Soviet Union
- Party: Party of Regions

Serhiy Fedorovych Kaltsev (Ukrainian: Сергій Федорович Кальцев; born 20 April 1960), is a Ukrainian politician who had served as a member of the Verkhovna Rada from 2012 to 2014.

Kaltsev was head of the Zaporizhzhia regional organization of the Party of Regions. He was appointed a Knight of the Order of Merit III degree in 2010. Serhiy's younger brother is Volodymyr Kaltsev.

== Biography ==
Serhiy Kaltsev was born in Berdiansk on 20 April 1960. From 1975 to 1979, he attended the Berdyansk Machine-Building Technical School, with the specialty of "technician-technologist".

Kaltsev graduated from the Rostov Institute of Agricultural Engineering with a degree in "Metal-cutting machines and tools", as a mechanical engineer. He has a higher School of Corporate Management at the Moscow Academy of National Economy (Master of Business Administration qualification). From 1979 to 1981, he completed military service in the Soviet Army. From 1981, he worked for nine years as a locksmith and mechanic at the Berdyansk Road Machinery Plant and the Berdyansk Experimental Plant of Lifting and Transport Equipment. In 1992, he founded and headed the small enterprise "Iveko".

In 2006, Kaltsev was elected a member of parliament, People's Deputy of Ukraine of the Verkhovna Rada's 5th convocation from the Party of Regions list. In October 2010, he was elected deputy of the Zaporizhzhia Oblast Council on the list of the Party of Regions in the elections to local self-government bodies. He was the permanent deputy of the committee on budget issues. In the 2012 parliamentary elections, Kalstev was elected a people's deputy of the Verkhovna Rada from the Party of Regions in the single-mandate majority electoral district No. 75. According to the results of the voting, he won by gaining 38.40% of the votes.

In 2007, Kaltsev became a co-founder of the Zaporizhia Regional Charitable Fund of the Cathedral of St. Equal-to-the-Apostle Prince Volodymyr.

== Political views ==
Kaltsev was one of the 148 People's Deputies of Ukraine who in June 2013 signed the Appeal of Deputies from the Party of Regions and the Communist Party of Ukraine to the Polish Sejm with a request to "recognize the Volyn tragedy as genocide against the Polish population and condemn the criminal acts of Ukrainian nationalists."

== Family ==
Kaltsev is married, with a son.
