= Volodymyr Malyshev =

Ukrainian politician

Vlodoymyr Malyshev
- Володимир Малишев
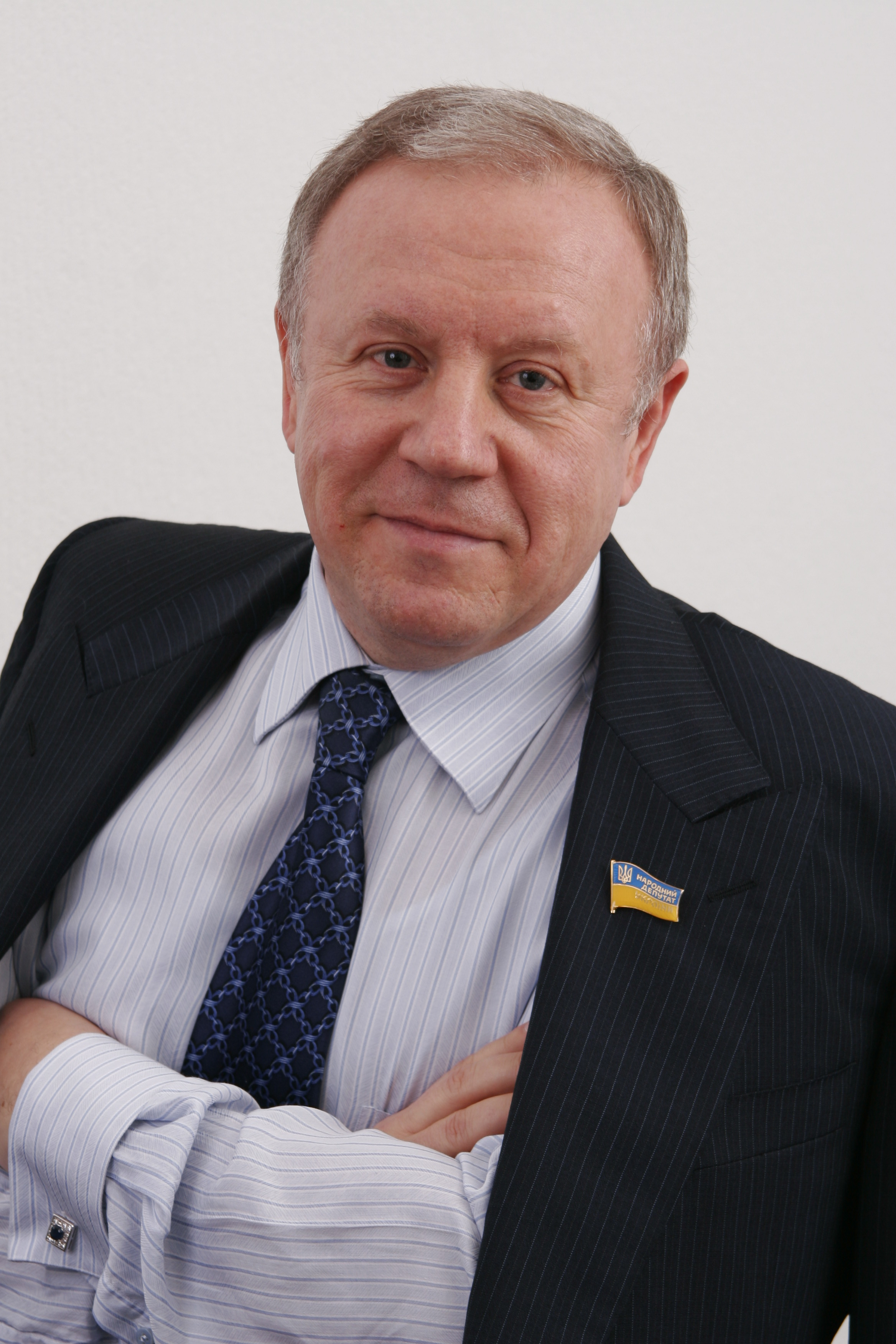

People's Deputy of Ukraine

5th convocation
- In office 25 May 2006 – 12 June 2007
- Constituency: Party of Regions, No.64

6th convocation
- In office 23 November 2007 – 12 December 2012
- Constituency: Party of Regions, No.64

7th convocation
- In office 12 December 2012 – 27 November 2014
- Constituency: Party of Regions, No.62

Personal details
- Born: 26 July 1950 (age 76) Stalino, Soviet Union (now Ukraine)
- Citizenship: Ukrainian
- Party: Party of Regions
- Spouse: Olena Malysheva (maiden name - Prylutska)
- Children: Julia, Natalia

Malyshev Volodymyr Stepanovych is a colonel-general of militia of Ukraine, politician, and lawyer.

He was born on 26 July 1950 in Stalino.

His father, Malyshev Stepan Kuzmich worked at the Donetsk metallurgical plant as a smelter. His mother was Malysheva Galyna Dmytrivna.

== Awards ==
=== Orders ===
- Third Class Order of Merit (Ukraine), 3 July 2001
- Second Class Order of Merit (Ukraine), 26 July 2010
