= Borys Bilash =

Ukrainian poet and politician (born 1941)

Hero of Ukraine Borys Bilash OS
- Борис Білаш
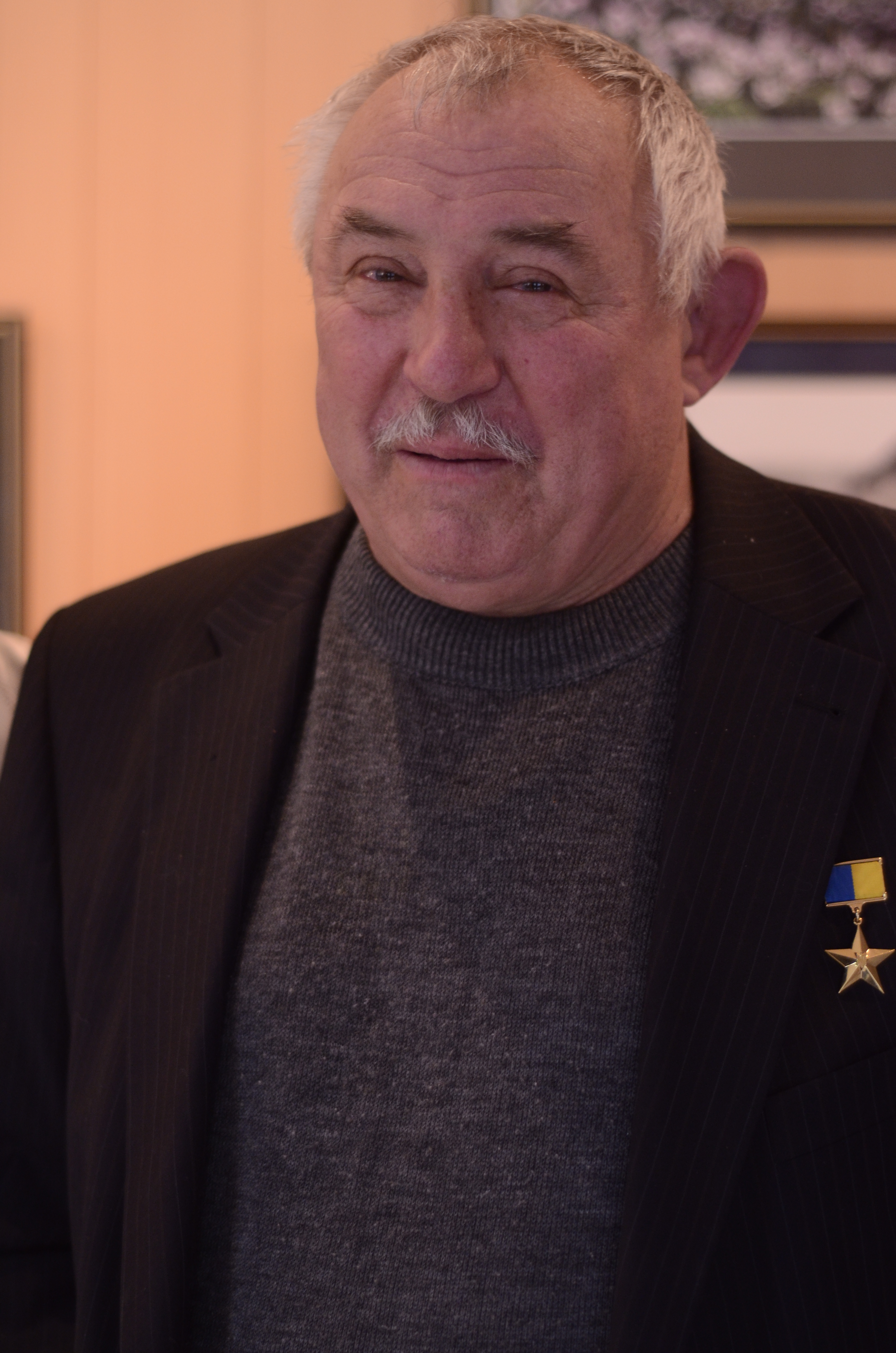
- Borys in 2011

People's Deputy of Ukraine
- In office 29 February 2012 – 12 December 2012
- In office 20 February 2007 – 23 November 2007

Personal details
- Born: 1 August 1941 (age 85) Khanlar District, USSR (now Azerbaijan)
- Party: Russian Bloc; Party of Regions
- Education: Maxim Gorky Literature Institute
- Occupation: Writer; poet; politician
- Awards: Hero of Ukraine

Borys Fedorovich Bilash (Ukrainian: Борис Федорович Білаш; born 1 August 1941) is a Ukrainian writer, poet and politician who is a recipient of the Hero of Ukraine and Order of Merit. Additionally, he was a member of the Ukrainian Verkhovna Rada in 2007 and 2012.

== Early life and education ==
Born on 1 August 1941, in the Khanlar District of the Azerbaijani SSR. Borys and his family migrated to the Donbas in 1944, and he spent his childhood and adolescence in Horlivka. He was a miner after graduating from the Horlivka Industrial College, but soon continued his studies in 1974, where he graduated from the Maxim Gorky Literature Institute in Moscow.

== Career ==
When Borys was younger, Volodymyr Yavorivsky observed that he was a free poet, with a little oddity here and there, but it was intriguing and he was later admitted into the Union of Writers. He is the writer of almost 30 works that have been released by Moscow, Kyiv, and Donbas publishing companies. Mainly in the Donbas, he used to have books in Moscow and Kyiv. His poetry on Sviatohirsk and his home country were also published in Moscow and Czechoslovakia. He asserted that he is a particularly well-known person in the Donbas, that kids study and even create poetry by him.

With the Party of Regions, No. 229 on the list, Borys was elected as the People's Deputy of Ukraine for the 5th Ukrainian Verkhovna Rada, which took place from 20 February to 23 November 2007. Later, in March 2007, he joined the Committee on Human Rights, National Minorities, and International Relations, and in February 2007, he joined the Party of Region. From 29 February 2012 to 12 December 2012, he was once more chosen to serve as the People's Deputy of Ukraine for the 6th Ukrainian Verkhovna Rada. This is to replace Oleksiy Lelyuk as deputy when his powers were prematurely ended by the Verkhovna Rada.

== Political views ==
Borys supported the Ukrainian draft law "On the Principles of State Language Policy" on 5 June 2012, endorsing the elevation of the status of Russian as the official language. Additionally, he has been observed in cases of Ukrainophobia, or Galician fear. In an interview, he was said to have stated, "I love pure Ukrainian, not saturated with the surzhik of Austria-Hungary."

== Controversies ==
Upon being elected as People's Deputy in 2012, Borys declared that he was indeed a citizen of the Donbas, citing two reasons: first, President Viktor Yanukovych had heard his poetry, songs, and artistic evenings at the Philharmonic; second, both of them had simply known one other for a considerable amount of years when he was not in politics.

Given the propagandist character of his efforts and their low quality, the title of Hero of Ukraine was viewed adversely by a number of prominent individuals and organizations. A court appeal of the President's decree was made and the arguments are supported by the evidence that the order was passed in contravention of Article 6 of the Law "On State Awards of Ukraine," which grants Ukrainian people the title in recognition of a noteworthy deed or exceptional work accomplishment. Yuriy Vynnychuk is adamant that Borys's designation as a Hero of Ukraine came about only as a result of his personal friendship with President Yanukovych.

== Personal life ==
Borys is a pensioner in Donetsk.

== Awards and recognitions ==
Borys has received awards and recognitions such as:

- Hero of Ukraine Order of the State (23 August 2011)
- Order of Merit Third Class (3 July 2002)
- Honored Worker of Culture of Ukraine (16 October 1999)
- Honorary Citizen of Sviatohirsk
- Member of the National Writers' Union of Ukraine
