= Olena Vitenko =

Ukrainian politician (born 1960)

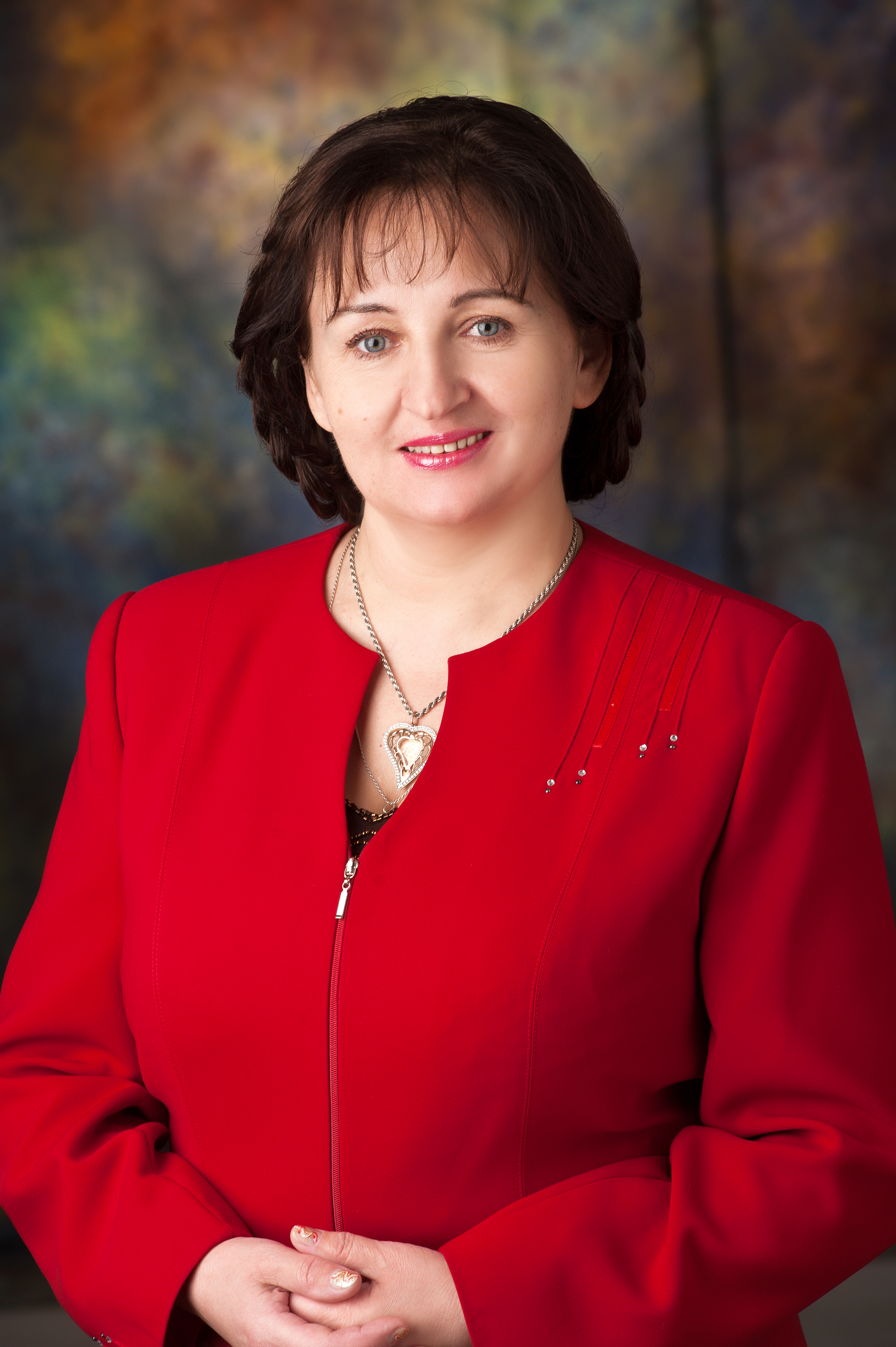
Vitenko in 2011

Olena Andriivna Vitenko (born 9 December 1960) is a Ukrainian politician, writer, and public figure. People's deputy of Ukraine of the 5th convocation from All-Ukrainian Union “Fatherland” ("Batkivshchyna"). Founder of the Vinnytsia Regional Local Lore Literary and Artistic Public Organization "Velyka Ridnya" (2007). Member of the National Union of Writers of Ukraine (2006) and National Union of Journalists of Ukraine (2005).

== Early life and education ==
Olena Vitenko was born on December 9, 1960, in the village of Dubovets of the Nemyriv district in the Vinnytsia region in a family of collective farmers. Her father is from Volyn, and her mother is from Podolia region. She lost her parents early.

Vitenko studied at the Kyiv Institute of Trade and Economics (1984–1989), graduating as a specialist in non-food products of the highest category. Then, she continued her education at the Vinnytsia State Technical University (1999–2000) as an accountant-economist ("Accounting and Auditing"). She was a postgraduate student of the National Academy of Public Administration under the President of Ukraine (2007–2011).

== Career ==
From 1979 to 1999, Olena Vitenko worked at the Vinnytsia regional association of the firm “Odiag” (“Clothing”). Between 2000 and 2002, she was an accountant at "Dekort LTD" LLC.

From 2000 to 2007, Vitenko was a member of the All-Ukrainian Union “Batkivshchyna” and the head of the NGO "Women of the "Batkivshchyna". From April 2002, Vitenko was a deputy head for ideological issues. In 2002–2007, she headed the Vinnytsia regional organization of the All-Ukrainian Union "Batkivshchyna". She was a trustee of the candidate for the post of President of Ukraine, Viktor Yushchenko, in Territorial Election District No. 16 (2004–2005).

In 2002–2006, Vitenko was the Deputy of the Vinnytsia City Council (2002–2006) and a secretary of the permanent commission on education, physical education, and sports. From July 2005 to April 2006, she was the Head of the Main Department for Internal Policy, Mass Media and Public Relations of the Vinnytsia Regional State Administration.

From April 2006 to November 2007, Vitenko was the People's Deputy of Ukraine of the 5th convocation from the Yulia Tymoshenko Bloc as No. 119 on the list. At the time of the elections, she was the Head of the Main Department for Internal Policy, Mass Media and Public Relations of the Vinnytsia Regional State Administration and a member of the All-Ukrainian Union "Batkivshchyna”. Vitenko was the Head of the subcommittee on state policy in language development and use of the Committee on Culture and Spirituality (since July 2006) and a member of the Yulia Tymoshenko Bloc faction (since May 2006).

In 2007, Vitenko founded the Vinnytsia Regional Local Lore Literary and Artistic Public Organization "Velyka Ridnya". She is a member of the National Union of Writers of Ukraine (2006), National Union of Journalists of Ukraine (2005), Vinnytsia city organization "Union of Ukrainian Women", Taras Shevchenko "Prosvita" Society, Vinnytsia Regional Literary and Art Association named after Vasyl Stus.

== Other activities ==
Being a poet and novelist by profession, Vitenko used the pseudonym Hnat Vovkamnebrat in satirical and humorous publications and Olga Semeniuk in lyrical ones. She authored over a dozen books of lyrical and patriotic poetry, humor, song texts, and poems for children.

== Awards and honors ==
- Winner of the Vinnytsia Citizen of the Year competition in the "Public Figure" category (2003);
- Diploma of honor of Vinnytsia Regional State Administration and Regional Council (June 2003);
- Winner of the Vinnytsia Regional Competition "Person of the Year" in the nomination "Regional Leader" (2006);
- Literary and artistic award named after Marko Vovchok (2007);
- Ivan Koshelivets International Literary Prize (2009);
- All-Ukrainian Literary Award named after Mykhailo Kotsyubynskyi (2019);
- All-Ukrainian literary and artistic award named after Stepan Rudanskyi (2020) for the books of satire and humor "In Your Own Europe" and "Everything Is Reaped".
