= Nataliya Bohasheva =

Ukrainian politician (born 1960)

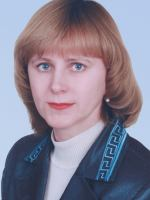
Nataliya Bohasheva

Nataliya Vladyslavivna Bohasheva (born 17 December 1960) is a Ukrainian politician.

== Early life and education ==
In 1984, Nataliya Bohasheva graduated from Kyiv Polytechnic Institute as a system engineer of electronic computing machines. In 2000, she graduated from legal studies at the Taras Shevchenko Kyiv National University as a lawyer.

== Career ==
In 1978–1979, Nataliya Bohasheva worked as an accountant for Central Pharmacy No. 7 of the Shevchenkiv district of Kyiv. Between 1979 and 1981, she was a technician-electrician and technician-designer at the Kyiv Automation Plant. From 1981 to 1993, Bohasheva worked as an engineer and electrical engineer at Kyiv Special Design and Technology Bureau "Dnipro".

In 1993–1994, Bohasheva worked as a bailiff of the Zhovtne District Court of the Department of Justice of the Kyiv City State Administration. Between February and June 1994, she was the Ukrainian-Canadian joint venture "Teolta-K" executive director in Kyiv. From 1994 to 1999, Bohasheva was a referent, an acting head of the organizational department, and a head of the organizational department of the People's Movement of Ukraine Secretariat.

From 1999 to 2006, Bohasheva was an assistant consultant to the People's Deputy of Ukraine. In 2007–2008, she was an adviser to the President of Ukraine. Between 2007 and 2010, she was a Deputy Minister of Justice of Ukraine.

From April 2006 to June 2007, Bohasheva was a People's Deputy of Ukraine of the 5th convocation from the Block "Our Ukraine" as No. 76 in the list. At the time of the elections, she was an assistant consultant of the People's Deputy of Ukraine and a member of the People's Union "Our Ukraine" party. Bohasheva was a Head of the Subcommittee on Election Legislation and Citizens' Unification of the Committee on State Building, Regional Policy, and Local Self-Government (since July 2006), a member of the Our Ukraine Block faction (since April 2006). She signed her parliamentary credentials on 15.06.2007.

Bohasheva is a civil servant of the 5th rank (since 12.2007), and 4th rank (since 01.2009). She is one of the developers of the Electoral Code of Ukraine project.
