= Yevhen Shaho =

Ukrainian politician (1941–2026)

- Євген Шаго
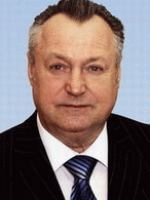
- Official Verkhovna Rada portrait, 2007

People's Deputy of Ukraine
- In office 25 May 2006 – 12 December 2012

Personal details
- Born: Yevhen Petrovych Shaho; 23 November 1941 Dniprodzerzhynsk, Dnipropetrovsk Oblast, Ukrainian SSR, Soviet Union
- Died: 14 August 2026 (aged 84)
- Party: Batkivshchyna
- Education: Dneprodzerzhynsk Industrial Institute; Academy of Social Sciences under the Central Committee of the CPSU
- Occupation: Engineer

Yevhen Petrovych Shaho (Ukrainian: Євген Петрович Шаго; 23 November 1941 – 14 August 2026) was a Ukrainian politician. A member of Batkivshchyna, he served in the Verkhovna Rada from 2006 to 2012.

Shaho died on 14 August 2026, at the age of 84.
