= Mykola Yankovsky =

Ukrainian businessman

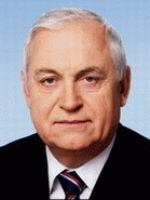
Yankovsky in 2007

Mykola Andriyovych Yankovsky (born 12 August 1944 in Pokotilovo, Ukrainian SSR) is a former Ukrainian businessman who has influenced Ukraine’s chemical production landscape and made it environmentally friendly. Candidate of Economic Sciences (1998), Professor, Head of the Department of Advanced Technologies in Management of Donetsk State Academy of Management (since 1999); Academician of AINU (1992), AENU (1995). Member of the Academy of Russian Entrepreneurs (1997). Professor Emeritus of the Ukrainian State University of Chemical Technology. Hero of Ukraine ( 2003 ).

== Biography ==
Mykola Yankovsky was born on August 12, 1944, in ( Pokotilovo village, Novoarkhangelsk district, Kirovohrad Oblast ); wife Galina (1949) - housewife; daughters Irina (1967) and Tatiana (1973); son Igor (1974).

Yankovsky is now retired, spending time with his family and friends. He has lived a private life for some years, but during his career as an entrepreneur, Yankovsky has impacted Ukraine’s chemical production landscape and brought in inventions and business practices that were largely unknown when the Soviet Union came to an end. He transformed Donetsk’s industry to meet accepted social and ecological standards.

=== Education and publication ===
Mykola Yankovsky studied at Dneprodzerzhinsk Crafts School from 1961 to 1963; and later on at Dnepropetrovsk Chemical Technology Institute (1963-1969) as a chemical engineer technologist with a specialization of "Technology of inorganic substances and mineral fertilizers"; PhD thesis "Model of foreign economic activity of chemical enterprises". His Doctoral dissertation is "Management of enterprise competitiveness in world markets" (Institute of Industrial Economics of NASU, 2005).

Yankovsky is a Doctor of Economics, Professor, and Head of Department Advanced Management Technologies since 1999 at Donetsk State University of Management. He has been an incumbent member of the Academy of Engineering Science of Ukraine since 1992 as well as an honorary Professor of the Ukrainian State University of Chemical Technology. He is an honorary Doctor of Odesa State Academy of Technical Regulation and Quality as well as a member of the International Academy of Standardization.

Yankovsky is an author of more than 150 scientific works and academic publications, including more than 10 monographs and textbooks published in Ukraine and abroad. His monographs include: “Model of the foreign economic activity of chemical industry enterprises” (1997), “Forecasting the development of a large industrial complex: theory and practice” (1999), “Improving the efficiency of foreign economic activity of a large industrial complex” (2000), and “Innovative and classical theories of catastrophes and economic crises” (2010).

In total, Yankovsky published more than 100 papers and manuals on production management, the chemical industry, international economy and bulk chemicals technology. Some of his monographies and manuals on chemical science are highly regarded and recommended by professors, and are used for teaching in higher and secondary specialized educational institutions of Ukraine

=== Career ===
In 1982, Yankovsky became the director at the Dneprodzerzhinsk production plant. Two years later in 1984, he took on the responsibility as the director at “Azot”. From 1986 to 1987 he was deputy director at Pershamaiski machine factory. In 1987, he joined Gorlovka ON “Stirol” as chief engineer and took on the position of general director in 1988. He led the construction from scratch of two of the ten currently existing Ukrainian factories specialized in the production of ammonia. Another three of the ten currently existing plants were modernized under the supervision and active involvement of Mykola Yankovsky.

In 1995, Yankovsky and his son Igor took an active part in the development of Trading House of the Corporate Group "Stirol" (city of Gorlovka, Donetsk Region). To date, the company is the largest chemical complex of Ukraine, specializing in the production of polymers, fertilizers, ammonia, pharmaceuticals. With Stirol becoming one of the major chemical production businesses in Eastern Europe. Yankovsky was able to gain ownership of Stirol by the end of the 1990s.

In accordance with internationally recognized standards, the Big Four international audit firms have for many years audited OJSC “Stirol”, which allowed it to be one of the first Ukrainian joint-stock companies to issue Euro 125 million Eurobonds aimed at modernizing production.

Under Yankovsky’s leadership, OSJC Stirol became the most valuable brand in the Ukrainian chemical industry. His efforts were recognized with the honorary title of “Hero of Ukraine”, awarded in 2003 for his contribution to the development of the Ukrainian chemical industry and the production of internationally competitive products.

OSJC Stirol also was one of the first companies in Eastern Europe and CIS countries to produce granulated carbamide and the first in Europe to use a closed water supply cycle for its production processes without the use of river water and with complete cessation of runoff into the environment.

Prior to the sale of OSJC Stirol, the company prepared for an IPO, though this failed due to uncertainties on the natural gas markets.

The company was highly successful and in 2010 the majority of Stirol shares were sold to Ostchem Holdings. According to the Kyiv Post, Yankovsky was among the wealthiest Ukrainians in 2010.

Yankovsky also takes the following positions: Chairman of the Union of Donbass Chemists, Chairman of the Board of Directors of Gorlovka; Member of the Exporters Council under the CM of Ukraine (since 02.1999); Member of the Committee on State Prizes of Ukraine in Science and Technology (since 03.1997). Trustee of the candidate for the post of President of Ukraine Viktor Yanukovych in ballot paper # 48 (2004-2005).

As Igor Sharov notes in his book, Mykola Andriyovych was a fervent supporter of the privatization of large industrial enterprises. He said that "Our" failing "enterprises should be privatized, at least for the hryvnia. As soon as possible." He considered every privatization case to be specific and did not see anything wrong with the growth of foreign capital, if investors wanted to develop the economy of the enterprise. Member of the Board and representative of the International Organization of Mineral Fertilizer Manufacturers and Traders (IFA) in Ukraine.

== Social commitments ==
Yankovsky is a member of Ukraine's national council on philanthropy.

=== Working conditions ===
During his time as CEO of OJSC Stirol, Yankovsky reformed the standards under which chemical plants in Ukraine were run. Working conditions and production methods were significantly improved, leading to greater safety for employees and notably increasing efficiency and production quality.

=== Environmental improvements ===
Yankovsky further improved working conditions by adopting environmentally friendly production processes and greatly reducing the environmental footprint of OJSC Stirol. He said that, “we want to create an environment in which even rare animals would like to live”. He managed this by opening a zoo with over 500 animals and birds living on the territory of the production plant.

=== Church ===
Mykola Yankovsky supported the diocese of the Ukrainian Orthodox Church, facilitating the construction of temples in Gorlovka and other cities of Ukraine.

== Political activity ==
Yankovsky’s sense of social responsibility and desire to care for his employees led him into the world of politics. From 1994 to 1998, he served as Deputy of Donetsk Regional Council. This was followed by four consecutive terms as People’s Deputy of Ukraine. from 1998 to 2012.

In the 1998 elections, he was elected People's Deputy of the Verkhovna Rada of Ukraine of the III convocation in a single-mandate constituency in the Donetsk region (received 44.9% of the vote).

In the 2002 elections, he was elected People's Deputy of the Verkhovna Rada of Ukraine of the IV convocation in a single-mandate constituency in the Donetsk region (nominated from the electoral bloc " For United Ukraine! ", Received 34.45% of the vote).

In the 2006 elections, he was elected People's Deputy of the Verkhovna Rada of Ukraine of the V convocation (was No. 17 on the list of the Party of Regions).

In the 2007 election, he was elected People's Deputy of the Verkhovna Rada of Ukraine of the VI convocation (was No. 15 on the list of the Party of Regions).

== Family ==
Yankovsky is married to Galina (born 1949). Together they have three children: Irene (born 1967), Tatiana (born 1973) and Igor (born 1974).

His son Yankovskyi Igor has been prominently involved in his business activities.

== Awards and achievements ==
- Hero of Ukraine with the award of the order of the state (May 22, 2003): for outstanding personal services to the Ukrainian state in the development of the chemical industry, production of competitive domestic products.
- Order of Prince Yaroslav the Wise (Fifth Class) (November 30, 2012): for significant personal contribution to the socio-economic, scientific, technical, cultural and educational development of the Ukrainian state; significant work achievements and many years of diligent work.
- Honorary Mention of the President of Ukraine (December 7, 1994): or his significant personal contribution to the organization of production of new types of high quality chemical products, recognition of them on the world market.
- Order of Honor (for the construction of an ammonia production plant in 1979).
- Certificate of Honor of the Presidium of the Verkhovna Rada of the USSR (for the construction of the second ammonia production plant in 1985).
- Certificate of Honor of the Verkhovna Rada of Ukraine.
- Order of the Ukrainian Orthodox Church (2008).
- Order of Saint Equal Apostle Prince Vladimir (1st degree 2008).
- Order of the Reverend Nestor the Chronicler with a moire ribbon (first degree for the construction of the Temple of the Image of Christ Non-man-made in Gorlovka 2008).
- Order of Saint Apostle Andrew the First Called (2013).
- Best Top Manager of Ukraine (2006): “Investgazeta” and “Top 100” have named Yankovsky as the best manager in Ukraine.
