= Serhiy Kyi =

Ukrainian politician

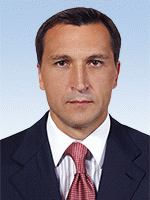
Serhii Viktorovych Kiy

Serhii Viktorovych Kiy (Ukrainian: Сергій Вікторович Кий, Russian: Сергей Викторович Кий) is a Ukrainian politician and businessman. He was the people's deputy of the Verkhovna Rada of Ukraine V (2006–2007), VI (2007–2012), and VII (2012– 2014) convocations. After Euromaidan he declined politics.

== Early years ==
Serhii Kiy was born on December 21, 1969 in the city of Susuman, Magadan Region, Russia. In 1988 he graduated from vocational school No. 24 in the Yasinovata, Donetsk region as a gas and electric welder. From 1988 to 1990 Kiy served in the USSR army.

Kiy graduated from Donetsk National University in 2005 (international economics).

This businessman lives in Kyiv now.

== Political career ==
From 2006 to 2007 Srhii Kiy was the People's Deputy of Ukraine of the 5th convocation from the Party of Regions of Ukraine faction (No. 70 on the electoral list). Member of the Verkhovna Rada Committee on Fuel and Energy Complex, Nuclear Policy, and Nuclear Safety.

From 2007 to 2012 Kiy was the People's Deputy of Ukraine of the VI convocation from the Party of Regions (No. 69 on the electoral list). Member of the Verkhovna Rada Committee on Family, Youth Policy, Sports, and Tourism.

From December 2012 to November 2014 – People's Deputy of Ukraine of the VII convocation from the Party of Regions (No. 33 on the list). Member of the Verkhovna Rada Committee on Foreign Affairs. After February 2014, he did not appear at the meetings of the Verkhovna Rada.

== Business activities ==
From 1990 to 1996 he worked in his specialty at private enterprises.

From 1997 to 1998 Kiy was the manager of the Donagroprodukt.

From 1998 to 1999 he was Deputy Director of Schit LLC.

From 2000 to 2001 Serhii worked at CJSC Azov Food Company.

In 2001 – 2006 – Assistant of the Rinat Akhmetov, the President of FC Shakhtar (Donetsk).

In 2012, he took 52nd place in the ranking of the 200 wealthiest people in Ukraine for $283 million.

Kiy is the owner of a controlling stake in the ARS concern, which controls coal and coke enterprises in Ukraine.

The ultimate beneficiary of Prioritet Financial Company LLC.

== Private life ==
He is single and has a son Mykyta (2002).

== See also ==
- 2007 Ukrainian parliamentary election
- List of Ukrainian Parliament Members 2007
