= Yuriy Hnatkevych =

Ukrainian politician (1940–2025)

- Юрій Гнаткевич
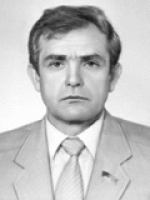
- Official potrait, 1990

People's Deputy of Ukraine
- In office 23 November 2007 – 12 December 2012
- In office 17 October 2006 – 12 June 2007
- In office 15 May 1990 – 12 June 1994

Personal details
- Born: Yuriy Vasylevich Hnatkevych; 4 April 1940 Dobryvoda, Rivne Oblast, Ukrainian SSR, USSR
- Died: 26 May 2025 (aged 85)
- Party: Batkivshchyna
- Education: Kyiv National Linguistic University
- Occupation: Teacher

Yuriy Vasylevich Hnatkevych (Ukrainian: Ю́рій Васи́льович Гнатке́вич; 4 April 1940 – 26 May 2025) was a Ukrainian politician. A member of Batkivshchyna, he served in the Verkhovna Rada from 1990 to 1994, 2006–2007 and again from 2007 to 2012.

Hnatkevych died on 26 May 2025, at the age of 85.
