= Petro Hasiuk =

Ukrainian politician (1951–2026)

- Петро Гасюк
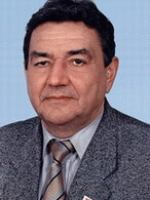
- Official portrait, 2007

People's Deputy of Ukraine
- In office 25 May 2006 – 12 December 2012

Personal details
- Born: 30 January 1951 Dormidontovka, Khabarovsk Krai, Russian SFSR, Soviet Union
- Died: 12 March 2026 (aged 75) Chernivtsi, Chernivtsi Oblast, Ukraine
- Party: Batkivshchyna
- Education: Chernivtsi State University
- Occupation: School administrator

Petro Petrovych Hasiuk (Ukrainian: Петро Петрович Гасюк; 30 January 1951 – 12 March 2026) was a Ukrainian politician. A member of Batkivshchyna, he served in the Verkhovna Rada from 2006 to 2012.

Hasiuk died in Chernivtsi on 12 March 2026, at the age of 75.
