= Lviv Insulator Company =

Ukrainian glass insulator company

Coordinates: 49°47′54″N 24°04′31″E

Lviv Insulator Company, ltd
- Industry: Energy development, Industry
- Founded: 2002, 1965
- Headquarters: Lviv, Ukraine
- Area served: Worldwide
- Key people: Dynik, Oxana (previously - Oleg Demidov)
- Products: Glass Insulators
- Website: www.energyglass.com.ua

The Lviv Insulator Company Ltd (Ukrainian: Львівська ізоляторна компанія, L’vi’vska Izolja’torna Kompa'nija) is a limited liability company established in 2002 and based in the city of Lviv, Ukraine. It is a sole producer of glass insulators in Ukraine. It is the runner-up producer of glass line insulators in the countries of former Soviet Union. The address: 301 Zelena str., Lviv, Ukraine.Postal index 79066

Its abbreviated official name is LIC.

== History: Lviv Insulator Factory ==
LIC is the successor of Lviv Insulator Plant (LIP), which was found in 1965.

LIP produced insulators on a global scale. The Lviv Insulator Factory manufactured burned and hard-tempered glass. The Lviv Insulator Company continued the manufacturing traditions of LIP. More than 250 million insulators have been manufactured since its foundation, and they are used on power lines ranging from 0.4 to 1150 kV in more than 30 countries.

== See also ==
- Insulator (electrical)

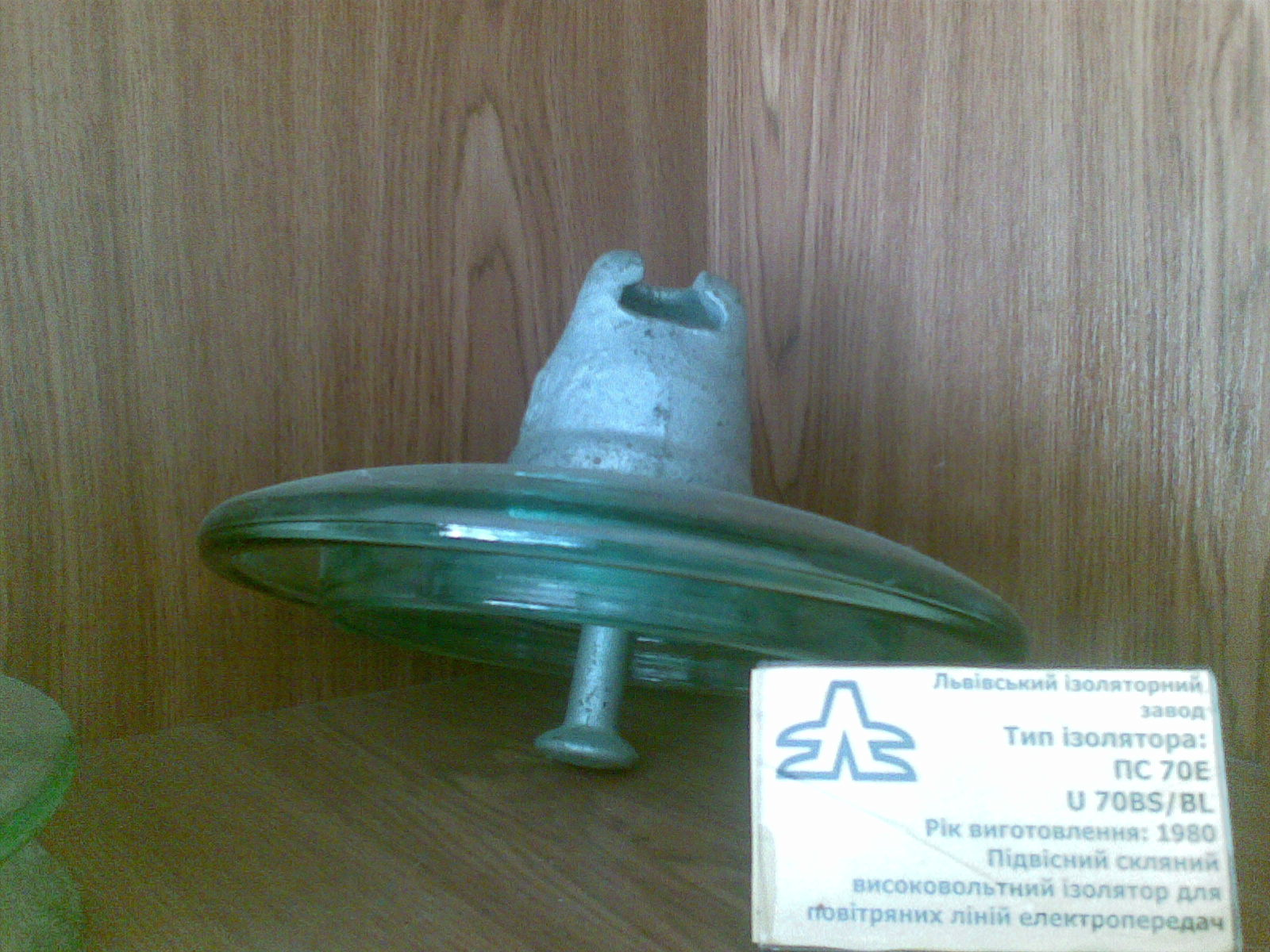
Suspended glass disk insulator unit U 70BS/BL, used in high voltage transmission lines.
