= Stanislav Melnyk =

Ukrainian businessman and politician (1961–2015)

Volodymyr Kaltsev
- Станіслав Мельник
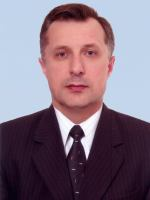

Member of the Verkhovna Rada
- In office 26 March 2006 – 27 November 2014

Personal details
- Born: Stanislav Anatoliyovych Melnyk; July 11, 1961 Berezivka, Ukrainian SSR, Soviet Union
- Died: 9 March 2015 (aged 53) Ukrainka, Kyiv Oblast, Ukraine
- Party: Party of Regions

Stanislav Anatoliyovych Melnyk (Ukrainian: Станіслав Анатолійович Мельник; 11 July 1961 – 9 March 2015) was a Ukrainian businessman and politician.

== Early life and business career ==
Melnyk was born on 11 July 1961 in Berezivka, which was then part of the Ukrainian SSR in the Soviet Union. In 1983, he graduated from the Odesa National Academy of Food Technologies, where he specialized in machines of food production and received the qualification of a mechanical engineer. He then worked at a food products plant in Monastyryshche, before moving to Donetsk to work at Donetsk Beer Association from 1984 to 1992. By the end of his time there in 1992, he was the chief engineer.

After switching to business, he was the director of RDK Heleo LLC from 1992 to 1995, director of Oriya LLC from 1995 to 1999, and deputy production director of Donetsk Brewery in 1999., He was manager of the Donetsk Brewery for six years and between 2005 and his election to the Verkhovna Rada he was CEO of 'Lux' JSC. He also ran security firm that protected the assets of System Capital Management, which is Rinat Akhmetov's main holding company.

== Political career ==
Between 2002 and 2006 Melnyk was member of the Donetsk City Council.

He was member of the Verkhovna Rada of the fifth (2006–2007) and sixth (2007–2012) convocations for the Party of Regions.

== Personal life and death ==
He was married to Larysa Oleksandrivna, a senior lecturer at the Donetsk National University of Economics and Trade named after M. Tugan-Baranovsky. Together, they had two children: Yuliia, born in 1988, and Ivan, born in 1989.

He was found shot dead in the bathroom of his apartment in Ukrainka, Kyiv Oblast on 9 March 2015. He was 53 years old. He left a suicide note asking for forgiveness.
