= Andriy Lopushanskyi =

Ukrainian politician (born 1962)

- Андрій Лопушанський
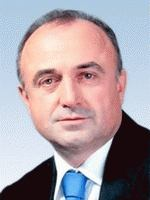
- Official portrait, 2019

People's Deputy of Ukraine
- Incumbent
- Assumed office 26 October 2014
- Preceded by: Andriy Tyahnybok
- Constituency: Lviv Oblast, No. 125
- In office 25 May 2006 – 15 June 2007
- Constituency: NUNS Bloc, No. 70

Personal details
- Born: 4 December 1962 (age 63) Dobromyl, Ukrainian SSR, Soviet Union (now Ukraine)
- Party: European Solidarity (since 2014)
- Other political affiliations: Independent; KUN (since 2000); NUNS Bloc (2006–2007)
- Education: Ivano-Frankivsk National Technical University of Oil and Gas

Andriy Yaroslavovych Lopushanskyi (Ukrainian: Андрій Ярославович Лопушáнський; born 4 December 1962) is a Ukrainian politician currently serving as a People's Deputy of Ukraine since 26 October 2014, representing Ukraine's 125th electoral district. He previously served in the Fifth Ukrainian Verkhovna Rada as a member of Our Ukraine–People's Self-Defense Bloc.

== Early life and career ==
Andriy Yaroslavovych Lopushanskyi was born on 4 December 1962 in the city of Dobromyl, in Ukraine's western Lviv Oblast. From 1978 to 1982, he studied at the Novorozdil Technical School, graduating with honours before studying at the Dnipropetrovsk Chemical and Technological Institute until 1986. In 1990, he graduated from the Ivano-Frankivsk National Technical University of Oil and Gas's pipelines faculty. He defended his PhD on energy and energy-saving technologies.

In the same year, Lopushanskyi began his foray into business. In 2005, he became chair of Dobromyl Ukrainian Industrial Company CJSC, an industrial chemical company. The same year, he founded Royal Hospitality Group LLC, a hotel business.

== Political career ==
In the 2006 Ukrainian parliamentary election, Lopushanskyi was elected as a People's Deputy of Ukraine for the first time, placed 70th on the party list of Our Ukraine–People's Self-Defense Bloc. However, he was not re-elected in the 2007 Ukrainian parliamentary election.

In the 2012 Ukrainian parliamentary election, Lopushanskyi ran in Ukraine's 125th electoral district as the candidate of the Congress of Ukrainian Nationalists (which he has been a member of since 2000). He was ultimately unsuccessful, losing to Andriy Tyahnybok, the candidate of Svoboda and the younger brother of Svoboda leader Oleh Tyahnybok.

Lopushanskyi ran in the 125th electoral district again in the 2014 Ukrainian parliamentary election, this time as an independent. He was successful, winning with 32.12% of the vote. In the Verkhovna Rada (Ukraine's parliament), he joined the Petro Poroshenko Bloc faction, and was head of the gas, gas transport industry, and gas supply subcommittee of the Verkhovna Rada Committee on the Fuel-Energy Complex, Nuclear Policy, and Nuclear Safety.

Lopushanskyi allegedly financed the activities of the Radical Party of Oleh Liashko (RPOL) in Lviv Oblast during the 2014 parliamentary election, and, during celebrations of the birth anniversary of Ivan Franko in Lviv, compared the RPOL to Franko's socialist Ukrainian Radical Party and additionally claimed the ideology of RPOL as scientific socialism.

Lopushanskyi once again ran in the 125th electoral district as an independent in the 2019 Ukrainian parliamentary election. He was again successful, defeating next-closest competitor, independent Yuriy Doskich, by a margin of 4.65%. He joined the European Solidarity (successor to the Petro Poroshenko Bloc) faction in the Verkhovna Rada, and became deputy chairman of the Committee of the Verkhovna Rada on issues of budget.

Lopushanskyi has supported the construction of monuments to controversial Ukrainian nationalist leader Stepan Bandera across Ukraine, including in Ukraine's capital, Kyiv. He is also the godfather of Ukrainian far-right politician and former Naftogaz chairman Oleksiy Ivchenko.

== Scandals ==
=== Naftogaz firing ===
In 2005, Lopushanskyi became deputy chairman of the board of directors at Ukrainian oil company Naftogaz, under his godson Ivchenko. Throughout the entire presidency of Viktor Yanukovych, Lopushanskyi did not actually work at Naftogaz despite being employed at the company, citing maternity leave. In the 2012 parliamentary election, Lopushanskyi said that he did not work at Naftogaz due to his opposition to what he referred to as "criminal authorities." On 18 June 2014, Prime Minister Arseniy Yatsenyuk dismissed Lopushanskyi "in connection with not showing up for work for more than four months in a row due to temporary incapacity."

=== Accusations of bribery ===
Lopushanskyi has repeatedly faced accusations of using bribery in elections, dating back to at least 2012. In the 2012 race in the 125th electoral district, Lopushanskyi's campaign, one of the most expensive in Lviv Oblast, allegedly employed bribery and the usage of money from his charity. Lopushanskyi has been also accused of using bribery via his charity in the 2019 parliamentary election.
