= Volodymyr Demidko =

Ukrainian politician (1952-2015)

- Володимир Демидко
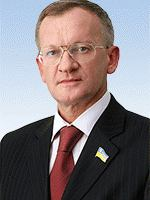
- An official portrait of him from 2012.

People's Deputy of Ukraine
- In office 12 December 2012 – 27 November 2014
- Constituency: Party of Regions, No. 28
- In office 23 November 2007 – 12 December 2012
- Constituency: Party of Regions, No. 170
- In office 14 September 2006 – 23 November 2007
- Constituency: Party of Regions, No. 201

Personal details
- Born: Volodymyr Mykolayovych Demidko; 12 February 1952 Stalino, Ukrainian SSR, Soviet Union (now Donetsk)
- Died: 10 November 2015 (aged 63) Kyiv, Ukraine
- Party: Liberal Party of Ukraine (1998-2000); Party of Regions (2005-2014)
- Education: Rutchenko Mining College (1971); Moscow Mining Institute (1980)

Volodymyr Mykolayovych Demidko (also transliterated as Demydko; Ukrainian: Володимир Миколайович Демидко; 12 February 1952-10 November 2015) was a Ukrainian politician and businesswoman who served as a People's Deputy of Ukraine in the Verkhovna Rada representing the 5th, 6th, and 7th convocations from 2006 to 2014 with the Party of Regions.

== Early life ==
Demidko was born on 12 February 1952 in the city of what was then Stalino (now Donetsk) in the Ukrainian SSR of the Soviet Union. He was born into a family of workers, and later recalled himself as not obedient as a child. At the age of fifteen, he graduated from secondary school and immediately pursued higher education and began attending the Rutchenko Mining College. He graduated from Rutchenko in 1971. Even prior to graduation, in 1970, he entered the mining industry, becoming a longwall miner and later foreman and specialist at Donetskugol. Describing this time of his life in an interview with Glavkom in 2011, he said "Personally, after the institute, I acted on the principle: take an overcoat and go to the mine, 250 kilometers from home." He left after three years, in 1973, to move to the capital of Kiev and work within the Ministry of Coal Industry of the USSR. Demidko worked there until 1987, moving up the ranks from an engineer in the technical department to a leading engineer and then finally assistant to the Minister of the Coal Industry of the USSR. Simultaneously, while he was working in the Ministry of Coal, he graduated from the Moscow Mining Institute in 1980 with a degree in technology and the integrated development of mineral deposits.

In 1987, Demidko finally returned to his hometown of Donetsk, when he was appointed assistant to the General Director of the Donetsk State Production Association of the Coal Industry. He then became assistant to the General Director of Glavdonetskugol and later chief engineer of the Donetsk Oblast Administration of the State Mining and Technical Supervision of the Ukrainian SSR. After the collapse of the Soviet Union in 1991, Demidko moved to the K. Pochenkov in Makiivka after he was appointed chief engineer there, and later also deputy director. He remained there for another four years, until 1995, when he was appointed chief engineer of the Donbas Scientific Centre of the Academy of Mining Sciences of Ukraine.

== Political career ==
=== Early career in Donetsk (1998-2006) ===
In 1998, Demidko decided to transition into a political career when he was appointed chairman of the Donetsk branch of the Liberal Party of Ukraine. After he was appointed chairman, Demidko attempted to enter the Verkhovna Rada in the 1998 Ukrainian parliamentary elections with the bloc "Party of Labor and Liberal Party – Together!" (which united the Liberal Party with the Party of Labor). However, he was ultimately not selected during that convocation. After this, he returned to being chairman of the Donetsk branch, a position he held until 2000. In 2000, he was appointed Head of the Department for Internal Policy of the Governor of Donetsk Oblast. At that time, the governor was Viktor Yanukovych. He and Yanukovych had known each other since the time when Yanukovych headed the Ordzhonikidzeugol coal-mining company, with political scientist Konstantin Bondarenko calling Demidko one of Yanukovych's closest associates. Upon Yanukovych being appointed Prime Minister of Ukraine in 2002, Anatoliy Blyznyuk succeeded him as governor, and Blyznyuk reassigned Demidko in 2003 to becoming Deputy Chairman for Information Policy, Nationalities, Culture, and Sports. On 14 February 2005, Demidko officially announced his resignation from the post, which was accepted. A few months later, he was appointed by Yanukovych to head the political apparatus of the Party of Regions for Donetsk Oblast, a position he held for exactly a year. In April 2006, he was elected to the Donetsk Oblast Council as a deputy, a position he held until he entered the Verkhovna Rada.

=== Verkhovna Rada (2006-2014) ===
==== 5th convocation (2006-07) ====
In 2006, during the 2006 Ukrainian parliamentary elections, Demidko decided to run for parliament again, this time on the party list of the Party of Regions. He was placed relatively low at No. 201, and thus was not initially selected in March. However, he entered parliament in September when multiple deputies resigned to work in the government, as deputies who worked in the government could not hold a dual mandate and still be a deputy. Upon entering the Rada during its 5th convocation, he immediately joined the faction of the Party of Regions and became a member of the Committee on Health Care. Within the Committee on Health Care, he was appointed chairman of the Subcommittee on Control over the Implementation of State Programmes. Simultaneously, he was appointed as an advisor to Yanukovych in October, who was Prime Minister again. However, he would not last long in this convocation, as the 5th convocation was dissolved early, and his powers were terminated on 23 November 2007.

==== 6th convocation (2007-12) ====
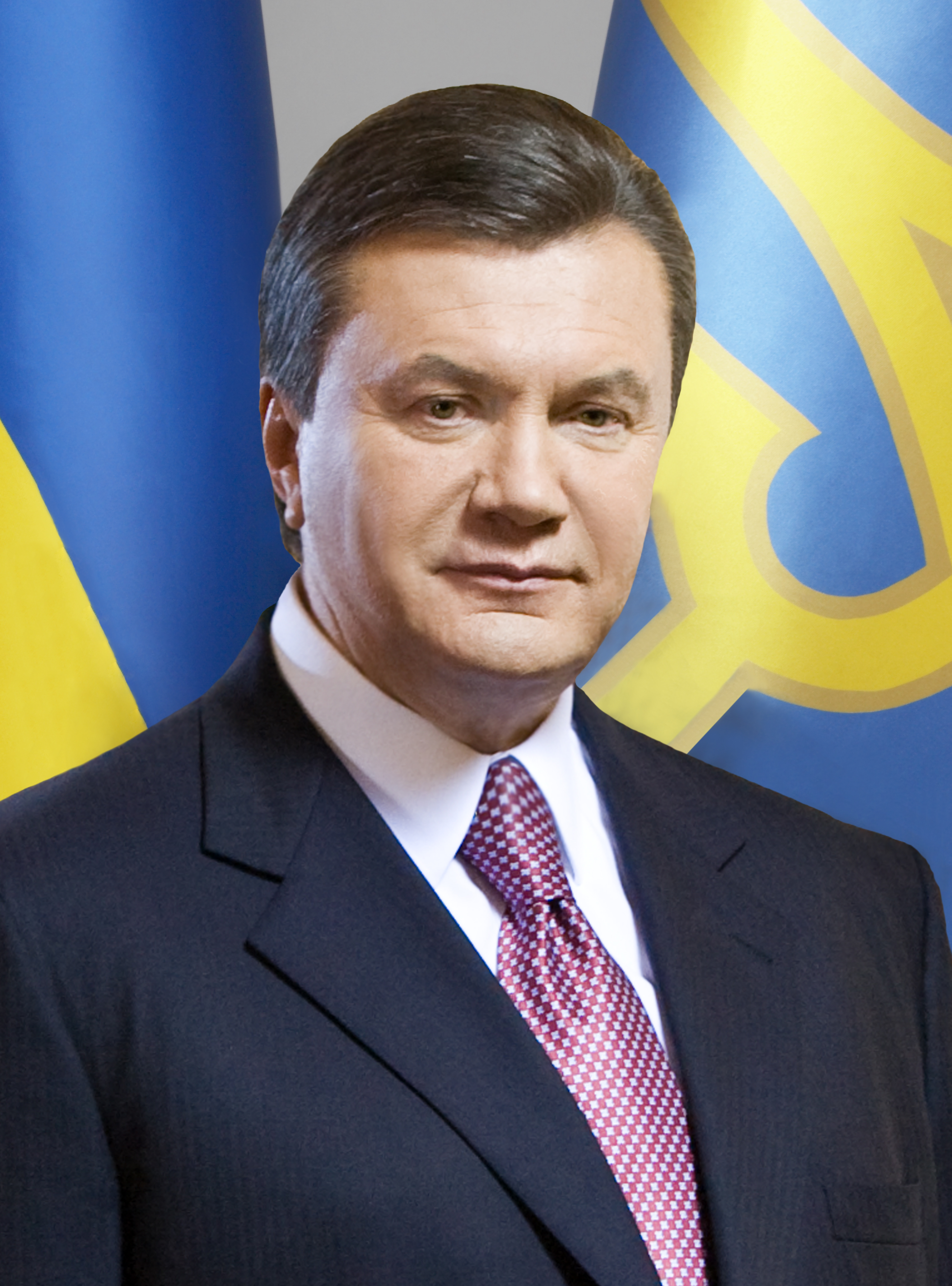
Demidko was often called one of the closest allies of Viktor Yanukovych (pictured here). In 2010, he helped co-author an amendment to article 61 which changed the rules on coalitions in the Verkhovna Rada, allowing the "Stability and Reforms" coalition to form.

After the 5th convocation collapsed, it was announced that he would be on the party list of the Party of Regions again for the snap 2007 Ukrainian parliamentary elections. This time he was placed a bit higher at No. 170. Thus, he was re-elected to the 6th convocation, exercising his powers on the same day the 5th convocation ended on 23 November 2007. Upon entering the Rada again, he became a member of the faction of the Party of Regions and was initially appointed as a member of the Committee on Rules of Procedure and Parliamentary Ethics.

During this convocation, he was perhaps best known for co-authoring a draft amendment to Article 61, which dealt with the rules of procedure of the Verkhovna Rada. The draft law that was proposed by Demidko would redefine what a parliamentary coalition is, changing it to be a combination of deputy factions and non-factional people's deputies, removing the requirement that coalitions must be formed only with parliamentary factions. This came after the collapse of the coalition of BYuT, OU-PSD, and the Lytvyn Bloc in March. The amendment was quickly added to the agenda of the Verkhovna Rada a day later, and that same day, an MP from the Party of Regions confirmed it would probably be adopted within a day, which it was. In an analysis in 2010, Pravo said that the amendment would likely be sent to the Constitutional Court of Ukraine by opponents, but that the case would probably not be appealed by the Court and that demands for reversing it would probably not work.

After the amendment was passed, a new coalition was formed with 235 deputies called "Stability and Reforms". In accordance with it, it included members of the factions of the Party of Regions, Communist Party of Ukraine, and Lytvyn Bloc, as well as individual non-factional deputies from parties like BYuT. In response, both the opposition leaders Viktor Yushchenko and Yulia Tymoshenko called the creation of the coalition "illegitimate", to which Yanukovych said he would send the issue to the Constitutional Court to legitimise the coalition. The creation of the "Stability and Reforms" coalition was also notable for paving the way to create the First Azarov government, as previously the parliamentary factions associated with Yanukovych did not have the majority to create a new government. After the coalition was formed, a few days later, Yanukovych appointed Demidko as a freelancer adviser to him on regional policy issues. A month later, he was also appointed as one of the Deputy Chairmen of the Party of Regions under Mykola Azarov, who was appointed Head of the Party of Regions after Yanukovych became President of Ukraine. His specific policy area as Deputy Chairman was ideological issues. When describing him in 2011, Glavkom called Demidko the most non-public of the deputy chairmen of the Party of Regions at the time.

==== 7th convocation (2012-14) ====
In 2012, Demidov confirmed he would be running for re-election again in the 2012 Ukrainian parliamentary elections. This time, he was placed much higher on the party list at No. 28. After re-entering the Rada again, he joined the faction of the Party of Regions and retained his membership on the Committee on Rules of Procedure and Parliamentary Ethics. A few months later, in September 2013, it was reported that Demidko had stepped down as Deputy Chairman of the Party of Regions "of his own free will" to give Borys Kolesnikov the post. Prior to this, it was reported in July 2013 that Demidko was the main person for the Party of Regions who controlled the speeches and theses of deputies, with Demidko defending it by saying that the main reason they wrote them was to help deputies not make mistakes or confuse people.

During the Euromaidan protests, Demidko reported that activists had failed to stop Yanukovych from exiting his residence in Novi Petrivtsi in January. He also accused the opposition leaders of playing "dirty games" and deliberately escalating tensions in Ukraine, without actually having any significant consequences. He then voted mostly with the party line, including voting for the so-called "laws on dictatorship" and voting against a resolution urging the stopping of killings of protestors after the Heavenly Hundred casualties. After the Euromaidan protests succeeded, acting President Oleksandr Turchynov immediately removed Demidko's role as an advisor to the president. Alongside the rest of the deputies, his powers were terminated early on 27 November 2014, and Demidko chose not to run for re-election during the subsequent snap elections.

== Personal life ==
Demidko was married to Lyubov Nikolaevna, who worked as an accountant at the Kalinin coal mine in Donetsk. Together they had two sons: Dmitry (born in 1974) and Eugene (born in 1981). Dimitry, their eldest, worked as a manager. Eugene/Evgeny, their youngest, was a politician and a member of the political council and presidium of the rump Party of Regions in 2018. In 2020, he was listed as the head of the branch of the Party of Regions in Kyiv.

=== Legal and health issues ===
In March 2015, the Prosecutor General's Office of Ukraine notified Demidko that he was under suspicion and had been put on the wanted list of Ukraine due to his voting regarding the so-called "laws on dictatorship". In response to the notification, the Party of Regions put out a statement saying that Demidko was in a coma after a massive stroke and had been undergoing long-term treatment at the "Feofaniia" hospital in Kyiv. The party also called it a "witch hunt", and said that Demidko should be removed from the list because of his coma and being unable to flee as a result. In his later book released in 2017, Azarov said Demidko had begun to suffer after being summoned for interrogations by the Prosecutor's Office, which resulted in him having high blood pressure that caused a stroke, although these remain accusations that were never confirmed.

=== Death ===
On 11 November 2015, it was reported that Demidko had died at the age of 64 after having been in a coma at Feofaniia.

== Honours and awards ==
Demidko was awarded the following honours:

- Order of Merit, III degree (2011)
