= Oleksandr Leshchynskyi (politician) =

Ukrainian politician (born 1939)

- Олександр Лещинський
- An official portrait of him from 2006.

People's Deputy of Ukraine
- In office 25 May 2006 – 23 November 2007

Personal details
- Born: Oleksandr Mykhailovych Leshchynskyi; 13 December 1939 (age 86) Makiivka, Ukrainian SSR, Soviet Union (now Ukraine)
- Party: Party of Regions (2006-2007)
- Education: Ukrainian State University of Railway Transport

Oleksandr Mykhailovych Leshchynskyi (Ukrainian: Олександр Лещинський; born 13 December 1939) is a Ukrainian politician who served as a People's Deputy of Ukraine in the Verkhovna Rada from 2006 to 2007 during the 5th (V) convocation, which ended early.

== Early life ==
Leshchynskyi was born on 14 December 1939 in the city of Makiivka, which was then part of the Ukrainian SSR in the Soviet Union. In 1959, after finishing secondary school, he first entered the workforce by becoming a station attendant at the Pavlohradvugillya Transport Union in Pavlohrad. While working at the time, he attended the Ukrainian State University of Railway Transport in Kharkiv, from which he graduated in 1968 with a specialisation in railway operation. Meanwhile, at Pavlohradvugillya, he was continuously promoted from station manager to head of the freight section to deputy head and finally chief engineer of Pavlohradvugillya before leaving the enterprise in 1969.

In 1969, he was transferred and promoted to becoming director of the Railway Transport Unit of Pavlohradvantazhtrans (or Pavlohrad Freight Transport), which is itself a subsidiary of Pavlohradvuhillya and is also based in Pavlohrad. He remained there for multiple decades, even after the collapse of the Soviet Union, only leaving the post in 2000. In 2000, he transferred to become chief engineer of the Transport and Logistics Unit of Pavlohradvantazhtrans for a year, until he was promoted to Deputy Director for Personnel and Social Affairs of Pavlohradvantazhtrans. He did this up until 2006, when he was appointed to the Rada.

== Political career ==
Prior to the collapse of the Soviet Union and shortly afterwards from 1990 to 1991, he served as Chairman of the Pavlohrad City Council. Sometime after this, with the formation of the Party of Regions in the now-independent Ukraine, he became chairman of its organisation in the city of Pavlohrad. In 2006, he ran and was elected to the 5th convocation of the Verkhovna Rada during the 2006 Ukrainian parliamentary elections. He was elected via party list as no. 191 on the list of the Party of Regions. While a deputy in the Rada during the convocation, he served on the groups with relations to Belgium, Italy, Switzerland, the United States, France, and the United Kingdom, and for the Committee on Rules of Procedure. The 5th convocation was ultimately terminated early in 2007, ending his mandate prematurely. He was not re-elected during the snap 2007 Ukrainian parliamentary elections when he was also on the party list but lower, at no. 247.

== Personal life ==
He is married to Tamara Vasylivna and has a daughter with her, Elena, who was born in 1960.
