= 7th Ukrainian Verkhovna Rada =

2012–2014 meeting of the Ukrainian Verkhovna Rada

(Ukraine) Verkhovna Rada of Ukraine of the 7th convocation
←	6th Verkhovna Rada	8th Verkhovna Rada	→
- Seat composition on February 26, 2014.

Overview
- Meeting place: Verkhovna Rada building
- Term: 12 December 2012 – 27 November 2014
- Election: 2012 parliamentary election (repeat elections in single mandate constituencies on December 15, 2013)
- Government: 29 committees
- Website: iportal.rada.gov.ua
- Members: 446 / 450 (on November 1, 2014)
- Chairman: Oleksandr Turchynov (from February 22, 2014; Fatherland)
- First Deputy: Vacant (from February 22, 2014)
- Deputy: Ruslan Koshulynskyi (from December 12, 2012; Svoboda)
- Party control: Coalition (from February 27, 2014)

Sessions
- 1st: December 2012 – January 2013
- 2nd: February 2013 – July 2013
- 3rd: September 2013 – January 2014
- 4th: February 2014 – August 2014
- 5th: September 2014 – October 2014

The Verkhovna Rada of Ukraine of the 7th convocation (Ukrainian: Верховна Рада України VII скликання, Verkhovna Rada Ukrayiny VII sklykannia) was a convocation of the legislative branch of the Verkhovna Rada, Ukraine's unicameral parliament. Its composition was based on the results of the 2012 parliamentary election. Half of the seats in the parliament were apportioned between the five winning parties based on the popular vote, while the other half was apportioned between 4 parties and 44 independents between 225 constituencies throughout the country. It first met in the capital Kyiv on December 12, 2012, and ended its session on November 27, 2014, after the 8th Verkhovna Rada began its first session.

Parliamentary work was virtually paralyzed the first months of 2013 because the opposition (UDAR, Fatherland, Freedom, others) blocked the podium and presidium seats on various days. According to a study conducted by Opora, deputies did not work for 53 days during the first hundred days in the 7th convocation.

== Major events ==
=== December 2012 – February 2013 ===
- December 12, 2012. Election of presidium, establishing parliamentary factions, establishing and assigning of committee, PACE Ukraine delegation, other.
- December 13, 2012. Confirming on the Presidential appointment of Mykola Azarov as the Prime Minister of Ukraine
- February 5, 2013. Parliamentary 2nd session did not start as the "opposition" (UDAR, Fatherland, Freedom, others) blocked the podium (tribune) and presidium seats in the protest of Rybak's actions and it demanded an end to the practice of deputies voting for non-present colleagues. Parliament was unblocked on 22 February 2013 after procedural measures had been implemented to prevent multiple voting.
- February 8, 2013. The Higher Administrative Court of Ukraine deprived United Centre member Pavlo Baloha (at the time a member of the Party of Regions parliamentary faction) and independent Oleksandr Dombrovsky of their deputy seats. The Court had established that the results in single-member districts number 11 (Vinnytsia Oblast; Dombrovsky) and number 71 (Zakarpattia Oblast; Baloha) during the October 2012 Ukrainian parliamentary election had been "unreliable".

=== March 2013-April 2013 ===
- March 5, 2013. The Higher Administrative Court of Ukraine stripped Andrey Verevskiy (Party of Regions) of his seat in parliament because he simultaneously was parliamentary deputy and headed a commercial entity.
- March 5, 2013. Members of Fatherland blocked the podium (tribune) and presidium seats in the protest of Chairman Rybak's inquiry to the Higher Administrative Court of Ukraine on depriving Serhiy Vlasenko (Fatherland) of his seat in parliament. Parliament was unblocked on 19 March 2013.
- March 6, 2013. The Higher Administrative Court of Ukraine stripped Serhiy Vlasenko (Fatherland) of his seat in parliament because he practiced advocacy and was a people's deputy at the same time.
- March 19, 2013. Party of Regions parliamentary leader Oleksandr Yefremov accused deputies from Svoboda of being neo-fascists after they booed a speech he made in Russian, which provoked a physical altercation to erupt between the two sides.
- March 29, 2013. Party of Regions members started to gather signatures for dismissal of Ruslan Koshulynsky from the position of parliamentary vice-speaker. According to one of the Party of Regions members, Inna Bohoslovska it is done due to the fact that Svoboda is a neo-fascist party.
- April 3, 2013. Parliamentary session did not start as the "opposition" (UDAR, Fatherland, Freedom, others) blocked the podium (tribune) and presidium seats; they had three demands:
1. Calling mayoral elections in Kyiv
2. Repealing pension reform
3. Considering the resignation of the Cabinet of Ministers of Ukraine.
- April 4, 2013. With the blocking the podium (tribune) and presidium seats continuing pro-government legislators left the official parliament hall and voted to approve to routine pieces of legislation in a nearby building (6-8 vulytsia Bankova); according to them (chairman of parliamentary regulations committee and participants of the Bankova meeting) "the sitting of the parliament could be held in another place if legislators want". Party of Regions stated 244 deputies (in the 450-seat parliament) supported the move, but the opposition insists that number was 182. The last time the parliament split into two and held two sessions on two different premises was in 2000. One of the opposition leaders Oleh Tyahnybok pointed out to the fact that the decision to conduct a session beyond the premises of Verkhovna Rada building should be first adopted in the parliament building, citing the parliamentary regulations. Opposition also claimed that none of its representatives were allowed to attend the session at Bankova.
- April 4, 2013. Batkivschyna legislators Oleh Kanivets, Vitaliy Nemylostyvy, Roman Stadniychuk and Ihor Skosar wrote statements to Verkhovna Rada Chairman Volodymyr Rybak with an applications to withdraw from the Batkivschyna faction. Later that day (only) Nemylostyvy and Stadniychuk confirm this while Kanivets and Skosar insisted that they are still the members of the Batkivschyna faction the press service of Batkivschyna party reported. Again later that day Kanivets and Skosar released a manifesto statement they did made "the only possible decision – to leave the ranks of the faction" because (Batkivschyna faction leader) Arseniy Yatsenyuk "is leading to an intraparty split and is a politically corrupt man, who dreams of becoming a national leader."
- April 5, 2013. Parliament did not start its session, as it was still blocked; the next plenary session of the parliament is scheduled for April 16.
- April 11, 2013. Leaders of opposition factions, Yatsenyuk (Fatherland), Vitali Klitschko (UDAR) and Oleh Tyahnybok (Freedom) are due to appear in the Holosiyivsky District Court of Kyiv under a lawsuit filed by citizen Vira Ivanova due to the blocking of the Verkhovna Rada.

=== June 2013 – September 2013 ===
- June 6, 2013. The opposition blocked the parliaments presidium seats until President Viktor Yanukovych reports his annual address to parliament personally in parliament (he had sent a written report).
- July 7, 2013. Pavlo Baloha and Oleksandr Dombrovsky mandates were officially cancelled.
- September 3, 2013 (opening session of the Verkhovna Rada after the summer recess). President Yanukovych urged parliament to adopt laws so that Ukraine will meet the European Union (EU) criteria so Ukraine and the EU can formally sign an Association Agreement in November 2013.
- September 5, 2013. The Verkhovna Rada itself set the date of the 7 re-elections to 15 December 2013.
- September 12, 2013. The Higher Administrative Court of Ukraine deprived Rodina Party member Ihor Markov (at the time a member of the Party of Regions parliamentary faction) of his deputy seats. The Court had established that the results in single-member districts number 133 (Odesa) had been "unreliable".

== Leadership ==
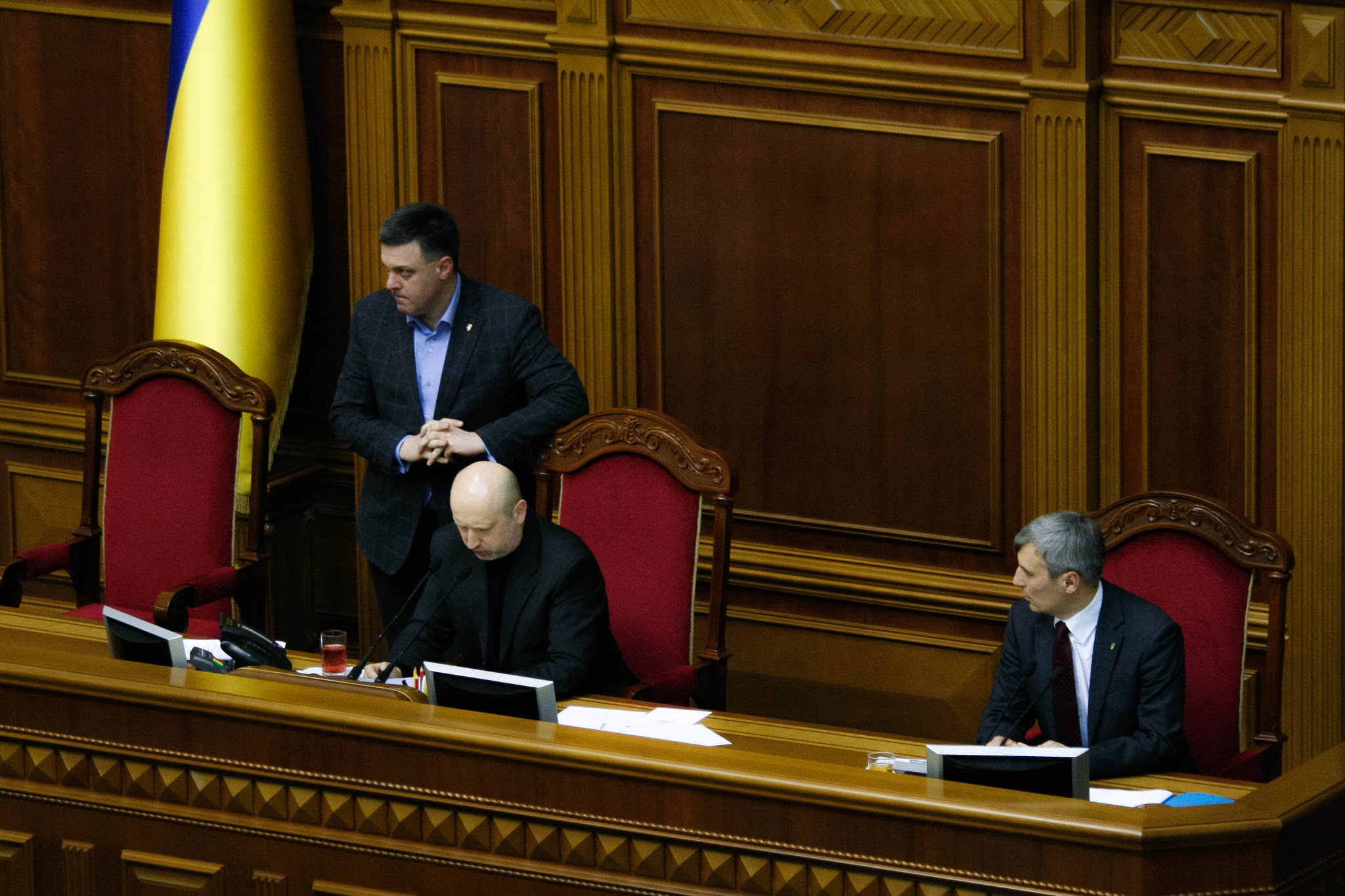
Oleh Tyahnybok (standing), Oleksandr Turchynov (left) and Ruslan Koshulynskyi (right) in parliament on February 24, 2014.

The parliament's chairman, first deputy, and deputy are all unaffiliated people's deputies according to parliamentary procedure.

Office	MP	Vote	Term	Party
Chairman	Volodymyr Rybak	250–79–1	Dec. 13, 2012–Feb. 22, 2014	Party of Regions
Chairman	Oleksandr Turchynov	288–0–5	Feb. 22, 2014–Nov. 27, 2014	Fatherland
First Deputy Chairman	Ihor Kalietnik	241–100–0	Dec. 13, 2012–Feb. 22, 2014	Communist Party of Ukraine
First Deputy Chairman	Vacant		Feb. 22, 2014–Nov. 27, 2014	Vacant
Deputy Chairman	Ruslan Koshulynskyi	305–6–3	Dec. 13, 2012–Nov. 27, 2014	Svoboda
Faction and group leaders	Oleksandr Yefremov			Party of Regions
Faction and group leaders	Arseniy Yatsenyuk			Fatherland
Faction and group leaders	Vitali Klitschko			UDAR
Faction and group leaders	Oleh Tyahnybok			Svoboda
Faction and group leaders	Petro Symonenko			Communist Party of Ukraine
Faction and group leaders	Yulia Tymoshenko			Fatherland
Faction and group leaders	Anatoliy Kinakh			Economic Development
Faction and group leaders	Ihor Yeremeyev			Sovereign European Ukraine
Faction and group leaders	Vitaly Hrushevskyi			For Peace and Stability

== Members ==
The 7th Ukrainian Verkhovna Rada began its term on 12 December 2012. 478 people's deputies were elected during the 2012 Ukrainian parliamentary elections.

=== Party list People's Deputies ===
Party list number	Deputy	Assumed office	Left office	Lifespan
Party of Regions, No. 1	Mykola Azarov	2012	2012	Born 17 December 1947 (age 78)
Party of Regions, No. 2	Taisia Povaliy	2012	2014	Born 10 December 1964 (age 61)
Party of Regions, No. 3	Serhiy Tihipko	2012	2014	Born 13 February 1960 (age 66)
Party of Regions, No. 5	Oleksandr Yefremov	2006	2014	Born 22 August 1954 (age 72)
Party of Regions, No. 7	Volodymyr Boyko	2012	2014	20 September 1938 – 10 June 2015 (aged 76)
Party of Regions, No. 8	Borys Kolesnikov	2002	2014	Born 25 October 1962 (age 64)
Party of Regions, No. 9	Leonid Kozhara	2012	2012	Born 14 January 1963 (age 63)
Party of Regions, No. 10	Volodymyr Rybak	2007	2014	Born 3 October 1946 (age 80)
Party of Regions, No. 11	Dmytro Tabachnyk	2012	2012	Born 26 November 1963 (age 62)
Party of Regions, No. 12	Oleksandr Lavrynovych	2012	2012	Born 28 June 1956 (age 70)
Party of Regions, No. 13	Hanna Herman	2012	2014	Born 25 May 1959 (age 67)
Party of Regions, No. 14	Stanislav Skubashevskyi	2012	2014	Born 30 May 1949 (age 77)
Party of Regions, No. 15	Anatoliy Blyznyuk	2012	2014	Born 24 November 1948 (age 77)
Party of Regions, No. 16	Igor Sharov	2007	2014	Born 10 August 1961 (age 65)
Party of Regions, No. 17	Volodymyr Oliinyk	2010	2014	Born 16 April 1957 (age 69)
Party of Regions, No. 18	Jan Tabachnyk	2006	2014	31 July 1945 – 11 September 2023 (aged 78)
Party of Regions, No. 19	Volodymyr Makeyenko	1998	2014	Born 17 July 1965 (age 61)
Party of Regions, No. 20	Elbrus Tedeyev	2006	2014	Born 5 December 1974 (age 51)
Party of Regions, No. 21	Mykhailo Chechetov	2006	2014	3 October 1953 – 28 February 2015 (aged 61)
Party of Regions, No. 22	Viktor Yanukovych	2006	2014	Born 16 July 1981 (age 45)
Party of Regions, No. 23	Vitaliy Khomutynnik	2002	2014	Born 4 August 1976 (age 50)
Party of Regions, No. 24	Yuriy Ivanyushchenko	2012	2014	Born 21 February 1959 (age 67)
Party of Regions, No. 25	Svitlana Fabrykant	2012	2014	Born 16 June 1967 (age 59)
Party of Regions, No. 26	Yurii Voropaiev	2007	2014	Born 10 January 1955 (age 71)
Party of Regions, No. 27	Nestor Shufrych	2007	2014	Born 29 December 1966 (age 59)
Party of Regions, No. 28	Volodymyr Demidko	2006	2014	12 February 1952 – 10 November 2015 (aged 63)
Party of Regions, No. 29	Yevhen Heller	2006	2014	Born 12 May 1974 (age 52)
Party of Regions, No. 30	Vladimir Maltsev	2006	2014	Born 20 April 1974 (age 52)
Party of Regions, No. 31	Volodymyr Vecherko	2006	2014	Born 7 November 1953 (age 72)
Party of Regions, No. 32	Nvier Mkhitarian	2007	2014	Born 16 June 1960 (age 66)
Party of Regions, No. 33	Serhiy Kyi	2007	2014	Born 21 December 1969 (age 56)
Party of Regions, No. 34	Mykola Demianko	2007	2014	Born 1 July 1947 (age 79)
Party of Regions, No. 35	Volodymyr Dudka	2012	2014	Born 21 March 1972 (age 54)
Party of Regions, No. 36	Tariel Vasadze	2012	2014	Born 15 September 1947 (age 79)
Party of Regions, No. 37	Vasyl Khmelnytsky	2007	2014	Born 10 September 1966 (age 60)
Party of Regions, No. 38	Oleh Zarubinskyi	2007	2014	Born 23 October 1963 (age 63)
Party of Regions, No. 39	Yurii Miroshnychenko	2006	2014	Born 3 February 1970 (age 56)
Party of Regions, No. 40	Viktor Turmanov	2002	2014	Born 15 August 1945 (age 81)
Party of Regions, No. 41	Andrii Selivarov	2006	2014	Born 25 May 1972 (age 54)
Party of Regions, No. 42	Serhii Moshak	2007	2014	Born 22 September 1965 (age 61)
Party of Regions, No. 43	Oleksandr Kuzmuk	2007	2014	Born 17 April 1954 (age 72)
Party of Regions, No. 44	Oleksandr Yehorov	2007	2014	Born 6 October 1965 (age 61)
Party of Regions, No. 45	Kateryna Vashchuk	2007	2014	Born 20 January 1947 (age 79)
Party of Regions, No. 46	Andriy Verevskyi	2002	2014	Born 25 July 1974 (age 52)
Party of Regions, No. 47	Olena Bondarenko	2006	2014	Born 26 May 1974 (age 52)
Party of Regions, No. 48	Yevhen Sihal	1998	2014	Born 19 May 1955 (age 71)
Party of Regions, No. 49	Hryhorii Smitiukh	2006	2014	Born 27 February 1961 (age 65)
Party of Regions, No. 50	Yuriy Chertkov	2006	2014	Born 16 May 1962 (age 64)
Party of Regions, No. 51	Mykola Bagrayev	2002	2014	Born 19 June 1964 (age 62)
Party of Regions, No. 52	Nurulislam Arkallayev	2006	2014	Born 19 January 1961 (age 65)
Party of Regions, No. 53	Anton Pryhodskyi	2006	2014	17 March 1950 – 22 November 2022 (aged 72)
Party of Regions, No. 54 (Note: Left Party of Regions following the February 2014 clashes during Euromaidan.)	Hennadiy Vasilyev	2007	2014	Born 3 October 1953 (age 73)
Party of Regions, No. 55	Oleh Shablatovych	2012	2014	Born 27 April 1979 (age 47)
Party of Regions, No. 56	Volodymyr Prodyvus	2012	2014	Born 8 December 1962 (age 63)
Party of Regions, No. 57	Artem Shcherban	2006	2014	Born 27 May 1974 (age 52)
Party of Regions, No. 58	Vitalii Kaliuzhnyi	2006	2014	Born 20 November 1979 (age 46)
Party of Regions, No. 59	Anatoliy Kinakh	2006	2014	Born 4 August 1954 (age 72)
Party of Regions, No. 60 (Note: Independent from 3 December 2013.)	Inna Bohoslovska	2007	2014	Born 5 August 1960 (age 66)
Party of Regions, No. 61	Stanislav Melnyk	2005	2014	11 July 1961 – 9 March 2015 (aged 53)
Party of Regions, No. 62	Volodymyr Malyshev	2006	2014	Born 26 July 1950 (age 76)
Party of Regions, No. 63	Mykhailo Myronenko	2006	2014	Born 16 November 1954 (age 71)
Party of Regions, No. 64	Alexander Volkov	2006	2014	Born 29 March 1964 (age 62)
Party of Regions, No. 65	Larysa Melnychuk	2012	2014	Born 23 March 1962 (age 64)
Party of Regions, No. 66	Pavlo Korzh	2006	2014	Born 13 November 1953 (age 72)
Party of Regions, No. 67	Vilen Shatvorian	2012	2014	Born 14 March 1981 (age 45)
Party of Regions, No. 68	Ihor Prasolov	2006	2014	Born 4 February 1962 (age 64)
Party of Regions, No. 69	Andrii Pinchuk	2006	2014	Born 26 January 1980 (age 46)
Party of Regions, No. 70	Anatolii Korzhev	2012	2014	Born 7 October 1944 (age 82)
Party of Regions, No. 71	Oleksandr Dolzhenkov	2012	2014	Born 26 April 1983 (age 43)
Party of Regions, No. 72	Oleksandr Stoian	1994	2014	Born 2 May 1943 (age 83)
Party of Regions, No. 73	Ion Popescu	2006	2014	Born 16 April 1964 (age 62)
Party of Regions, No. 74	István Gajdos	2012	2014	Born 5 May 1971 (age 55)
Party of Regions, No. 75	Vasyl Poliakov	2012	2014	Born 2 March 1972 (age 54)
Party of Regions, No. 76	Yurii Poliachenko	2013	2014	Born 20 February 1963 (age 63)
Party of Regions, No. 77	Oleksandr Zats	2013	2014	Born 8 September 1976 (age 50)
Party of Regions, No. 78	Yurii Blahodyr	2013	2014	Born 28 January 1978 (age 48)
Party of Regions, No. 79	Ivan Myrnyi	2013	2014	Born 6 July 1954 (age 72)
Party of Regions, No. 80	Oleksandr Kozub	2013	2014	Born 8 June 1956 (age 70)
Batkivshchyna, No. 2	Arseniy Yatsenyuk	2007	2014	Born 22 May 1974 (age 52)
Batkivshchyna, No. 3	Anatoliy Hrytsenko	2007	2014	Born 25 October 1957 (age 69)
Batkivshchyna, No. 4	Oleksandr Turchynov	2006	2014	Born 31 March 1964 (age 62)
Batkivshchyna, No. 6	Vyacheslav Kyrylenko	2006	2014	Born 7 June 1968 (age 58)
Batkivshchyna, No. 7	Hryhoriy Nemyria	2006	2014	Born 5 April 1960 (age 66)
Batkivshchyna, No. 8	Serhiy Sobolyev	2007	2014	Born 5 September 1965 (age 61)
Batkivshchyna, No. 9	Borys Tarasyuk	2007	2014	Born 31 March 1964 (age 62)
Batkivshchyna, No. 10 (Note: Independent from 2 April 2014.)	Mykola Tomenko	2006	2016	Born 11 December 1964 (age 61)
Batkivshchyna, No. 11	Mykola Kniazhytskyi	2012	2014	Born 2 June 1968 (age 58)
Batkivshchyna, No. 12	Mustafa Dzhemilev	2012	2014	Born 13 November 1943 (age 82)
Batkivshchyna, No. 13	Andriy Kozhemiakin	2006	2014	Born 13 November 1965 (age 60)
Batkivshchyna, No. 14	Liliya Hrynevych	2012	2014	Born 13 May 1965 (age 61)
Batkivshchyna, No. 15	Ivan Kyrylenko	2012	2014	Born 2 October 1956 (age 70)
Batkivshchyna, No. 16	Yaroslav Fedorchuk	2005	2014	Born 22 October 1936 (age 90)
Batkivshchyna, No. 17	Mykola Martynenko	1998	2014	Born 12 January 1961 (age 65)
Batkivshchyna, No. 18	Iryna Lutsenko	2012	2014	Born 7 February 1966 (age 60)
Batkivshchyna, No. 19	Andriy Pyshnyi	2012	2014	Born 26 October 1974 (age 52)
Batkivshchyna, No. 20	Serhiy Vlasenko	2008	2014	Born 7 March 1967 (age 59)
Batkivshchyna, No. 21	Andriy Parubiy	2007	2014	Born 31 January 1971 (age 55)
Batkivshchyna, No. 22	Oleksandra Kuzhel	2012	2014	Born 4 July 1953 (age 73)
Batkivshchyna, No. 23	Stepan Kubiv	2012	2014	Born 19 March 1962 (age 64)
Batkivshchyna, No. 24	Arsen Avakov	2012	2014	Born 1 February 1964 (age 62)
Batkivshchyna, No. 25	Yuriy Odarchenko	2012	2014	Born 5 April 1960 (age 66)
Batkivshchyna, No. 26	Lesya Orobets	2007	2014	Born 3 May 1982 (age 44)
Batkivshchyna, No. 27	Serhiy Pashynskyi	2006	2014	Born 14 October 1966 (age 60)
Batkivshchyna, No. 28	Oleksandr Abdullin	1998	2014	Born 29 June 1962 (age 64)
Batkivshchyna, No. 29	Andriy Pavelko	2012	2014	Born 7 October 1975 (age 51)
Batkivshchyna, No. 30	Dmytro Shlemko	2006	2014	Born 24 January 1950 (age 76)
Batkivshchyna, No. 31	Roman Zabzaliuk	2006	2014	Born 18 July 1960 (age 66)
Batkivshchyna, No. 32	Hennadiy Moskal	2007	2014	Born 11 December 1950 (age 75)
Batkivshchyna, No. 33	Andriy Shevchenko	2012	2014	Born 10 June 1976 (age 50)
Batkivshchyna, No. 34	Denys Dzenzerskyi	2012	2014	Born 22 December 1978 (age 47)
Batkivshchyna, No. 35	Valeriy Sushkevych	2012	2014	Born 14 June 1954 (age 72)
Batkivshchyna, No. 36	Vasyl Derevlianyi	2006	2014	Born 23 August 1962 (age 64)
Batkivshchyna, No. 37	Ruslan Kniazevych	2006	2014	Born 28 June 1974 (age 52)
Batkivshchyna, No. 38	Lyudmyla Denisova	2006	2014	Born 6 July 1960 (age 66)
Batkivshchyna, No. 39	Serhiy Faiermark	2012	2014	Born 14 March 1962 (age 64)
Batkivshchyna, No. 40	Viktor Shvets	2006	2014	Born 6 January 1954 (age 72)
Batkivshchyna, No. 41	Andriy Ivanchuk	2012	2014	Born 16 June 1973 (age 53)
Batkivshchyna, No. 42	Ruslan Lukianchuk	2006	2014	Born 19 March 1972 (age 54)
Batkivshchyna, No. 43	Maksym Burbak	2012	2014	Born 27 June 1971 (age 55)
Batkivshchyna, No. 44	Andrii Pavlovskyi	2007	2014	Born 25 May 1965 (age 61)
Batkivshchyna, No. 45	Kostyantyn Bondaryev	2007	2014	Born 13 September 1972 (age 54)
Batkivshchyna, No. 46	Leonid Serhienko	2012	2014	Born 27 April 1955 (age 71)
Batkivshchyna, No. 47	Serhii Sas	1994	2014	Born 7 August 1957 (age 69)
Batkivshchyna, No. 48	Andrii Senchenko	2006	2014	Born 1 November 1959 (age 67)
Batkivshchyna, No. 49	Oleksandr Tabalov	2012	2014	Born 12 October 1957 (age 69)
Batkivshchyna, No. 50	Vasyl Kravchuk	2007	2014	Born 18 November 1967 (age 58)
Batkivshchyna, No. 51	Valeriy Kalchenko	2006	2014	Born 24 February 1947 (age 79)
Batkivshchyna, No. 52	Pavlo Petrenko	2012	2014	Born 17 July 1979 (age 47)
Batkivshchyna, No. 53	Tetiana Sliuz	2006	2014	Born 9 April 1965 (age 61)
Batkivshchyna, No. 54	Volodymyr Shkvaryliuk	2012	2014	Born 9 July 1974 (age 52)
Batkivshchyna, No. 55	Tetiana Donets	2012	2014	Born 11 July 1980 (age 46)
Batkivshchyna, No. 56	Valeriy Holovko	2012	2014	Born 14 December 1965 (age 60)
Batkivshchyna, No. 57	Vitaliy Danilov	2007	2014	Born 10 June 1967 (age 59)
Batkivshchyna, No. 58	Ihor Skosar	2012	2014	Born 9 September 1968 (age 58)
Batkivshchyna, No. 59	Volodymyr Polchaninov	2012	2014	Born 25 April 1974 (age 52)
Batkivshchyna, No. 60	Olena Kondratiuk	2007	2014	Born 17 November 1970 (age 55)
Batkivshchyna, No. 61	Valerii Lunchenko	2012	2014	Born 13 October 1982 (age 44)
Batkivshchyna, No. 62	Vitalii Nemilostivyi	2012	2014	Born 26 April 1968 (age 58)
Batkivshchyna, No. 63	Yuriy Stets	2007	2014	Born 29 December 1975 (age 50)
Batkivshchyna, No. 64	Oleksandr Dubovoi	2007	2014	Born 11 March 1976 (age 50)
Batkivshchyna, No. 65	Roman Stadniichuk	2013	2014	Born 23 July 1980 (age 46)
Batkivshchyna, No. 66	Vadym Merikov	2014	2014	Born 23 February 1976 (age 50)
Batkivshchyna, No. 67	Oleh Shevchuk	2014	2014	Born 2 January 1968 (age 58)
Batkivshchyna, No. 68	Leonid Makul	2014	2014	Born 25 June 1958 (age 68)
Batkivshchyna, No. 69	Olena Ledovskykh	2014	2014	Born 6 April 1960 (age 66)
Batkivshchyna, No. 70	Ihor Hryniv	2014	2014	Born 10 March 1961 (age 65)
Batkivshchyna, No. 73	Ruslan Bogdan	2014	2014	Born 8 June 1956 (age 70)
Ukrainian Democratic Alliance for Reform, No. 1	Vitali Klitschko	2012	2014	Born 19 July 1971 (age 55)
Ukrainian Democratic Alliance for Reform, No. 2	Maria Matios	2012	2014	Born 19 December 1959 (age 66)
Ukrainian Democratic Alliance for Reform, No. 3	Valentyn Nalyvaichenko	2012	2014	Born 8 June 1966 (age 60)
Ukrainian Democratic Alliance for Reform, No. 4	Oksana Prodan	2012	2014	Born 16 May 1974 (age 52)
Ukrainian Democratic Alliance for Reform, No. 5	Vitalii Kovalchuk	2012	2014	Born 23 May 1969 (age 57)
Ukrainian Democratic Alliance for Reform, No. 6	Iryna Herashchenko	2007	2014	Born 15 May 1971 (age 55)
Ukrainian Democratic Alliance for Reform, No. 7	Viktor Pynzenyk	2012	2014	Born 15 April 1954 (age 72)
Ukrainian Democratic Alliance for Reform, No. 8	Natalia Ahafonova	2012	2014	Born 19 September 1977 (age 49)
Ukrainian Democratic Alliance for Reform, No. 9	Artur Palatnyi	2012	2014	Born 15 July 1973 (age 53)
Ukrainian Democratic Alliance for Reform, No. 10	Pavlo Rozenko	2012	2014	Born 15 July 1970 (age 56)
Ukrainian Democratic Alliance for Reform, No. 11	Natalia Novak	2012	2014	Born 21 November 1955 (age 70)
Ukrainian Democratic Alliance for Reform, No. 12	Roman Romanyuk	2012	2014	Born 18 October 1961 (age 65)
Ukrainian Democratic Alliance for Reform, No. 13	Valerii Karpuntsov	2012	2014	Born 15 June 1968 (age 58)
Ukrainian Democratic Alliance for Reform, No. 14	Mykola Palamarchuk	2012	2014	Born 25 April 1954 (age 72)
Ukrainian Democratic Alliance for Reform, No. 15	Serhiy Kunitsyn	2012	2014	Born 27 July 1960 (age 66)
Ukrainian Democratic Alliance for Reform, No. 16	Maria Ionova	2012	2014	Born 31 May 1978 (age 48)
Ukrainian Democratic Alliance for Reform, No. 17	Eduard Hurvits	2012	2014	Born 30 January 1948 (age 78)
Ukrainian Democratic Alliance for Reform, No. 18	Vitaliy Chuhunnikov	2012	2014	Born 13 April 1980 (age 46)
Ukrainian Democratic Alliance for Reform, No. 19	Valerii Patskan	2012	2014	Born 21 April 1975 (age 51)
Ukrainian Democratic Alliance for Reform, No. 20	Yaroslav Hinka	2012	2014	Born 21 November 1980 (age 45)
Ukrainian Democratic Alliance for Reform, No. 21	Hennadii Tkachuk	2012	2014	Born 27 August 1968 (age 58)
Ukrainian Democratic Alliance for Reform, No. 22	Rustam Raulov	2012	2014	Born 15 December 1964 (age 61)
Ukrainian Democratic Alliance for Reform, No. 23	Roman Cherneha	2012	2014	Born 1 November 1979 (age 47)
Ukrainian Democratic Alliance for Reform, No. 24	Oleksandr Korniichuk	2012	2014	Born 30 May 1973 (age 53)
Ukrainian Democratic Alliance for Reform, No. 25	Ihor Pober	2012	2014	Born 17 December 1968 (age 57)
Ukrainian Democratic Alliance for Reform, No. 26	Volodymyr Kurennoi	2014	2014	Born 2 August 1967 (age 59)
Ukrainian Democratic Alliance for Reform, No. 27	Yurii Savchuk	2012	2014	Born 22 September 1967 (age 59)
Ukrainian Democratic Alliance for Reform, No. 28	Pavlo Riabikin	2012	2014	Born 6 June 1965 (age 61)
Ukrainian Democratic Alliance for Reform, No. 29	Serhii Averchenko	2012	2014	Born 30 January 1965 (age 61)
Ukrainian Democratic Alliance for Reform, No. 30	Roman Vanzuryak	2012	2014	Born 13 April 1980 (age 46)
Ukrainian Democratic Alliance for Reform, No. 31	Olga Bielkova	2012	2014	Born 16 June 1975 (age 51)
Ukrainian Democratic Alliance for Reform, No. 32	Valerii Ishchenko	2012	2014	Born 11 November 1973 (age 52)
Ukrainian Democratic Alliance for Reform, No. 33	Oleksandr Mochkov	2012	2014	Born 27 May 1981 (age 45)
Ukrainian Democratic Alliance for Reform, No. 34	Rostyslav Pavlenko	2012	2014	Born 19 August 1976 (age 50)
Ukrainian Democratic Alliance for Reform, No. 35	Anatolii Revenko	2014	2014	Born 1 November 1952 (age 74)
Ukrainian Democratic Alliance for Reform, No. 36	Vitalii Krutii	2014	2014	Born 8 March 1967 (age 59)
Ukrainian Democratic Alliance for Reform, No. 37	Yehor Firsov	2014	2014	Born 1 December 1988 (age 37)
Ukrainian Democratic Alliance for Reform, No. 38	Vitalii Iliashenko	2014	2014	Born 9 April 1985 (age 41)
Communist Party of Ukraine, No. 1	Petro Symonenko	1994	2014	Born 1 August 1952 (age 74)
Communist Party of Ukraine, No. 2	Petro Tsybenko	1994	2014	Born 5 June 1949 (age 77)
Communist Party of Ukraine, No. 3	Iryna Spirina	2012	2014	Born 15 March 1959 (age 67)
Communist Party of Ukraine, No. 4	Spiridon Kilinkarov	2002	2014	Born 14 September 1968 (age 58)
Communist Party of Ukraine, No. 5	Oleksandr Prysiarzhniuk	2012	2014	Born 1 February 1986 (age 40)
Communist Party of Ukraine, No. 6	Igor Alekseyev	2002	2014	Born 10 January 1960 (age 66)
Communist Party of Ukraine, No. 7	Ihor Kalietnyk	2012	2014	Born 1 August 1952 (age 74)
Communist Party of Ukraine, No. 8	Adam Martyniuk	1998	2014	Born 16 July 1972 (age 54)
Communist Party of Ukraine, No. 9	Valentyn Matvieiev	1998	2014	Born 28 March 1943 (age 83)
Communist Party of Ukraine, No. 10	Yevhen Marmazov	2007	2014	Born 14 June 1938 (age 88)
Communist Party of Ukraine, No. 11	Oleksandr Holub	1998	2014	Born 19 July 1967 (age 59)
Communist Party of Ukraine, No. 12	Ruslan Skarboviichuk	2012	2014	Born 16 June 1975 (age 51)
Communist Party of Ukraine, No. 13	Serhii Hordiienko	2007	2014	Born 20 March 1957 (age 69)
Communist Party of Ukraine, No. 14	Serhii Honcharov	2012	2014	Born 2 December 1958 (age 67)
Communist Party of Ukraine, No. 15	Oleh Bukhovets	2012	2014	Born 10 July 1974 (age 52)
Communist Party of Ukraine, No. 16	Olha Mykhailenko	2012	2014	Born 23 September 1956 (age 70)
Communist Party of Ukraine, No. 17	Oleksandr Zubchevskyi	2012	2014	Born 30 June 1979 (age 47)
Communist Party of Ukraine, No. 18	Vladimir Bidyovka	2012	2014	Born 7 March 1981 (age 45)
Communist Party of Ukraine, No. 19	Mykola Dzardanov	2012	2014	Born 27 May 1953 (age 73)
Communist Party of Ukraine, No. 20	Serhii Balandin	2012	2014	Born 1 November 1973 (age 53)
Communist Party of Ukraine, No. 21	Serhii Topalov	2012	2014	Born 15 August 1965 (age 61)
Communist Party of Ukraine, No. 22	Viktoria Bulakh	2012	2014	Born 22 April 1974 (age 52)
Communist Party of Ukraine, No. 23	Roman Shuhalo	2012	2014	Born 27 December 1986 (age 39)
Communist Party of Ukraine, No. 24	Larysa Baidyuk	2012	2014	Born 26 February 1951 (age 75)
Communist Party of Ukraine, No. 25	Vasyl Samoilenko	2012	2014	Born 1 June 1946 (age 80)
Communist Party of Ukraine, No. 26	Viktor Hubar	2012	2014	Born 26 December 1971 (age 54)
Communist Party of Ukraine, No. 27	Anton Dorokhov	2012	2014	Born 25 October 1976 (age 50)
Communist Party of Ukraine, No. 28	Olha Levchenko	2012	2014	Born 30 September 1959 (age 67)
Communist Party of Ukraine, No. 29	Volodymyr Kudria	2012	2014	Born 17 October 1948 (age 78)
Communist Party of Ukraine, No. 30	Omelian Parubok	2012	2014	21 January 1940 – 2 June 2017 (aged 77)
Communist Party of Ukraine, No. 31	Mykhailo Herasymchuk	2012	2013	1 October 1947 – 7 November 2013 (aged 66)
Communist Party of Ukraine, No. 32	Olha Boryta	2012	2014	Born 25 February 1956 (age 70)
Communist Party of Ukraine, No. 33	Vasyl Demediuk	2013	2014	Born 18 August 1957 (age 69)
Communist Party of Ukraine, No. 34	Oleksandr Hanchukov	2014	2014	Born 17 June 1949 (age 77)
Svoboda, No. 1	Oleh Tyahnybok	2012	2014	Born 7 November 1968 (age 57)
Svoboda, No. 2	Bohdan Beniuk	2012	2014	Born 26 May 1957 (age 69)
Svoboda, No. 3	Andriy Mokhnyk	2012	2014	Born 15 June 1972 (age 54)
Svoboda, No. 4	Ihor Miroshnychenko	2012	2014	Born 20 February 1976 (age 50)
Svoboda, No. 5	Oleksandr Shevchenko	2012	2014	26 June 1937 – 15 January 2016 (aged 78)
Svoboda, No. 6	Anatoliy Vitiv	2012	2014	Born 22 July 1960 (age 66)
Svoboda, No. 7	Oleh Pankevych	2012	2014	Born 25 February 1976 (age 50)
Svoboda, No. 8	Ihor Shvaika	2012	2014	Born 25 February 1976 (age 50)
Svoboda, No. 9	Pavlo Kyrylenko	2012	2014	Born 29 September 1976 (age 50)
Svoboda, No. 10	Ihor Yankiv	2012	2014	Born 27 August 1971 (age 55)
Svoboda, No. 11	Leontii Martyniuk	2012	2014	Born 22 July 1971 (age 55)
Svoboda, No. 12	Ruslan Koshulynskyi	2012	2014	Born 9 September 1969 (age 57)
Svoboda, No. 13	Ihor Kryvetskyi	2012	2014	Born 9 August 1972 (age 54)
Svoboda, No. 14	Yurii Syrotiuk	2012	2014	Born 10 April 1976 (age 50)
Svoboda, No. 15	Oleh Helevei	2012	2014	Born 4 March 1965 (age 61)
Svoboda, No. 16	Oleh Syrotyuk	2012	2014	Born 18 February 1978 (age 48)
Svoboda, No. 17	Mykhailo Blavatskyi	2012	2014	Born 31 July 1958 (age 68)
Svoboda, No. 18	Oleksandr Myrnyi	2012	2014	Born 31 January 1961 (age 65)
Svoboda, No. 19	Andrii Mishchenko	2012	2014	Born 1 January 1973 (age 53)
Svoboda, No. 20	Ruslan Martsinkiv	2012	2014	Born 22 November 1979 (age 46)
Svoboda, No. 21	Oleh Makhnitskyi	2012	2014	Born 15 March 1970 (age 56)
Svoboda, No. 22	Valerii Cherniakov	2012	2014	Born 13 November 1966 (age 59)
Svoboda, No. 23	Eduard Leonov	2012	2014	Born 3 February 1974 (age 52)
Svoboda, No. 24	Sviatoslav Khanenko	2012	2014	Born 23 August 1953 (age 73)
Svoboda, No. 25	Ruslan Zelyk	2012	2014	Born 16 May 1965 (age 61)
Svoboda, No. 26	Oleksii Furman	2014	2014	Born 4 May 1969 (age 57)
Svoboda, No. 27	Oleh Bondarchuk	2014	2014	Born 16 March 1975 (age 51)
Svoboda, No. 28	Taras Osaulenko	2014	2014	Born 13 February 1964 (age 62)
Svoboda, No. 29	Markiian Lopachak	2014	2014	Born 10 June 1980 (age 46)
Svoboda, No. 30	Halyna Chorna	2014	2014	Born 18 November 1967 (age 58)

=== Single-mandate district People's Deputies ===
Oblast	District	Deputy	Party	Assumed office	Left office	Lifespan
Autonomous Republic of Crimea	No. 1	Vitalina Dzoz	Party of Regions	2012	2014	Born 16 November 1955 (age 70)
Autonomous Republic of Crimea	No. 2	Lev Mirimsky	Soyuz	2012	2014	2 April 1960 – 27 April 2017 (aged 57)
Autonomous Republic of Crimea	No. 3	Olena Netetska	Party of Regions	2011	2014	Born 27 October 1972 (age 54)
Autonomous Republic of Crimea	No. 4	Oleh Paraskiv	Party of Regions	2012	2014	Born 14 April 1966 (age 60)
Autonomous Republic of Crimea	No. 5	Valentyna Liutikova	Party of Regions	2012	2014	Born 4 October 1953 (age 73)
Autonomous Republic of Crimea	No. 6	Yuliya Lyovochkina	Party of Regions	2012	2014	Born 17 February 1977 (age 49)
Autonomous Republic of Crimea	No. 7	Serhii Braiko	Party of Regions	2012	2014	Born 8 December 1957 (age 68)
Autonomous Republic of Crimea	No. 8	Boris Deich	Party of Regions	2012	2014	23 August 1938 – 7 February 2022 (aged 83)
Autonomous Republic of Crimea	No. 9	Oleksandr Nechaiev	Party of Regions	2012	2014	Born 15 June 1963 (age 63)
Autonomous Republic of Crimea	No. 10	Hryhorii Hruba	Party of Regions	2012	2014	Born 30 March 1954 (age 72)
Vinnytsia Oblast	No. 11	Oleksandr Dombrovskyi	Petro Poroshenko Bloc	2012	2014	Born 7 July 1962 (age 64)
Vinnytsia Oblast	No. 12	Petro Poroshenko	Independent	2012	2014	Born 26 September 1965 (age 61)
Vinnytsia Oblast	No. 13	Mykola Katerynchuk	Batkivshchyna	2002	2014	Born 19 November 1967 (age 58)
Vinnytsia Oblast	No. 14	Viktor Zherebniuk	Independent	2012	2014	Born 21 July 1970 (age 56)
Vinnytsia Oblast	No. 15	Mykola Dzhyha	Party of Regions	2012	2014	Born 15 May 1949 (age 77)
Vinnytsia Oblast	No. 16	Oksana Kaletnyk	Communist Party of Ukraine (Note: Elected as an independent.)	2012	2014	Born 10 December 1972 (age 53)
Vinnytsia Oblast	No. 17	Hryhoriy Zabolotnyi	Independent	2012	2014	Born 6 January 1952 (age 74)
Vinnytsia Oblast	No. 18	Hryhorii Kaletnik	Party of Regions	2012	2014	Born 2 May 1949 (age 77)
Volyn Oblast	No. 19	Yevhen Melnyk	Svoboda	2012	2014	Born 14 May 1956 (age 70)
Volyn Oblast	No. 20	Serhiy Martyniak	Independent	2012	2014	Born 4 March 1971 (age 55)
Volyn Oblast	No. 21	Stepan Ivakhiv	Independent	2012	2014	Born 24 January 1968 (age 58)
Volyn Oblast	No. 22	Ihor Palytsia	Independent	2007	2014	Born 10 December 1972 (age 53)
Volyn Oblast	No. 23	Ihor Yeremeyev	Sovereign European Ukraine	2012	2014	3 April 1968 – 13 August 2015 (aged 47)
Dnipropetrovsk Oblast	No. 24	Yakiv Bezbakh	Party of Regions	2012	2014	Born 8 September 1957 (age 69)
Dnipropetrovsk Oblast	No. 25	Ihor Tsyrkin	Party of Regions	2012	2014	Born 6 September 1974 (age 52)
Dnipropetrovsk Oblast	No. 26	Ivan Stupak	Party of Regions	2012	2014	26 March 1960 – 28 May 2021 (aged 61)
Dnipropetrovsk Oblast	No. 27	Oleksandr Momot	Party of Regions	2012	2014	Born 12 June 1956 (age 70)
Dnipropetrovsk Oblast	No. 28	Yevhenii Morozenko	Party of Regions	2012	2014	Born 19 November 1958 (age 67)
Dnipropetrovsk Oblast	No. 29	Viktor Butkivskyi	Party of Regions	2012	2014	Born 29 April 1959 (age 67)
Dnipropetrovsk Oblast	No. 30	Kostiantyn Huzenko	Party of Regions	2012	2014	Born 21 November 1966 (age 59)
Dnipropetrovsk Oblast	No. 31	Kostiantyn Pavlov	Party of Regions	2012	2014	Born 12 January 1973 (age 53)
Dnipropetrovsk Oblast	No. 32	Yurii Liubonenko	Party of Regions	2012	2014	Born 12 April 1950 (age 76)
Dnipropetrovsk Oblast	No. 33	Viacheslav Zadorozhnyi	Party of Regions	2012	2014	Born 6 March 1955 (age 71)
Dnipropetrovsk Oblast	No. 34	Serhii Hlazunov	Party of Regions	2012	2014	Born 1 September 1958 (age 68)
Dnipropetrovsk Oblast	No. 35	Andrii Shypko	Party of Regions	2012	2014	Born 26 March 1970 (age 56)
Dnipropetrovsk Oblast	No. 36	Artur Martovytskyi	Party of Regions	2012	2014	Born 20 December 1978 (age 47)
Dnipropetrovsk Oblast	No. 37	Dmytro Shpenov	Party of Regions	2012	2014	Born 20 December 1978 (age 47)
Dnipropetrovsk Oblast	No. 38	Mykola Soloshenko	Party of Regions	2012	2014	Born 14 October 1950 (age 76)
Dnipropetrovsk Oblast	No. 39	Yurii Samoilenko	Party of Regions	2012	2014	Born 19 October 1944 (age 82)
Dnipropetrovsk Oblast	No. 40	Oleg Tsaryov	Party of Regions	2006	2014	Born 2 June 1970 (age 56)
Donetsk Oblast	No. 41	Oleksandr Bobkov	Party of Regions (Note: Independent from 3 June 2014.)	2012	2014	Born 18 April 1960 (age 66)
Donetsk Oblast	No. 42	Tatyana Bakhteeva	Party of Regions	2002	2014	Born 27 November 1953 (age 72)
Donetsk Oblast	No. 43	Valentyn Landyk	Party of Regions	2012	2014	Born 22 November 1946 (age 79)
Donetsk Oblast	No. 44	Nikolai Levchenko	Party of Regions	2012	2014	Born 16 October 1979 (age 47)
Donetsk Oblast	No. 45	Yukhym Zvyahilsky	Party of Regions	2012	2014	20 February 1933 – 6 November 2021 (aged 88)
Donetsk Oblast	No. 46	Serhiy Klyuyev	Party of Regions	2012	2014	Born 19 August 1969 (age 57)
Donetsk Oblast	No. 47	Oleksiy Azarov	Party of Regions	2012	2014	Born 13 July 1971 (age 55)
Donetsk Oblast	No. 48	Yurii Boiarskyi	Party of Regions	2012	2014	Born 28 November 1960 (age 65)
Donetsk Oblast	No. 49	Denys Omelianovych	Party of Regions	2012	2014	Born 17 August 1977 (age 49)
Donetsk Oblast	No. 50	Leonid Baysarov	Party of Regions	2012	2014	Born 19 July 1947 (age 79)
Donetsk Oblast	No. 51	Anatolii Honcharov	Party of Regions	2012	2014	Born 23 December 1949 (age 76)
Donetsk Oblast	No. 52	Ihor Shkiria	Party of Regions	2002	2014	Born 20 August 1965 (age 61)
Donetsk Oblast	No. 53	Leonid Lytvynov	Party of Regions	2012	2014	Born 7 July 1944 (age 82)
Donetsk Oblast	No. 54	Vladyslav Lukianov	Party of Regions	2012	2014	Born 21 February 1964 (age 62)
Donetsk Oblast	No. 55	Valerii Omelchenko	Party of Regions	2006	2014	Born 4 October 1980 (age 46)
Donetsk Oblast	No. 56	Vitaliy Bort	Party of Regions	2006	2014	Born 1 September 1972 (age 54)
Donetsk Oblast	No. 57	Serhiy Matiyenkov	Party of Regions	1998	2014	Born 8 November 1956 (age 69)
Donetsk Oblast	No. 58	Oleksii Bilyi	Party of Regions	2012	2014	Born 1 May 1961 (age 65)
Donetsk Oblast	No. 59	Oleksandr Vasyliev	Party of Regions	2012	2014	Born 29 October 1951 (age 75)
Donetsk Oblast	No. 60	Oleksandr Ryzhenkov	Party of Regions	2012	2014	Born 5 June 1950 (age 76)
Donetsk Oblast	No. 61	Andrii Ponomarov	Party of Regions	2012	2014	Born 2 July 1961 (age 65)
Zhytomyr Oblast	No. 62	Hennadiy Zubko	Batkivshchyna	2012	2014	Born 27 June 1967 (age 59)
Zhytomyr Oblast	No. 63	Anzhelika Labunska	Independent	2012	2014	Born 2 November 1967 (age 59)
Zhytomyr Oblast	No. 64	Volodymyr Pekhov	Party of Regions	2012	2014	Born 4 January 1969 (age 57)
Zhytomyr Oblast	No. 65	Volodymyr Lytvyn	People's Party	2012	2014	Born 28 April 1956 (age 70)
Zhytomyr Oblast	No. 66	Vitaliy Zhuravskyi	Party of Regions	2012	2014	Born 8 May 1955 (age 71)
Zhytomyr Oblast	No. 67	Viktor Razvadovsky	Independent	2012	2014	Born 3 June 1959 (age 67)
Zakarpattia Oblast	No. 68	Vasyl Kovach	Party of Regions	2012	2014	Born 10 June 1956 (age 70)
Zakarpattia Oblast	No. 69	Viktor Baloha	Andriy Baloha's Team	2012	2014	Born 15 June 1963 (age 63)
Zakarpattia Oblast	No. 70	Mykhailo Lano	Party of Regions	2012	2014	Born 17 November 1964 (age 61)
Zakarpattia Oblast	No. 71	Pavlo Baloha	Andriy Baloha's Team	2012	2014	Born 27 May 1977 (age 49)
Zakarpattia Oblast	No. 72	Vasyl Petiovka	Andriy Baloha's Team	2012	2014	Born 30 January 1967 (age 59)
Zakarpattia Oblast	No. 73	Ivan Bushko	Party of Regions	2012	2014	Born 10 March 1969 (age 57)
Zaporizhzhia Oblast	No. 74	Yaroslav Sukhyi	Party of Regions	2012	2014	Born 26 March 1951 (age 75)
Zaporizhzhia Oblast	No. 75	Serhiy Kaltsev	Party of Regions	2012	2014	Born 20 April 1960 (age 66)
Zaporizhzhia Oblast	No. 76	Yevhen Kartashov	Party of Regions	2012	2014	Born 1 January 1942 (age 84)
Zaporizhzhia Oblast	No. 77	Vyacheslav Boguslayev	Party of Regions	2006	2014	Born 28 October 1938 (age 88)
Zaporizhzhia Oblast	No. 78	Oleksandr Ponomarov	Independent	2012	2014	Born 7 January 1962 (age 64)
Zaporizhzhia Oblast	No. 79	Volodymyr Bandurov	Party of Regions (Note: Independent from 12 August 2014.)	2012	2014	Born 6 May 1973 (age 53)
Zaporizhzhia Oblast	No. 80	Yevgeny Balitsky	Party of Regions	2012	2014	Born 10 December 1969 (age 56)
Zaporizhzhia Oblast	No. 81	Artem Pshonka	Party of Regions	2012	2014	Born 19 March 1976 (age 50)
Zaporizhzhia Oblast	No. 82	Oleksandr Dudka	Party of Regions	2012	2014	Born 17 August 1962 (age 64)
Ivano-Frankivsk Oblast	No. 83	Oleksandr Sych	Svoboda	2012	2014	Born 16 July 1964 (age 62)
Ivano-Frankivsk Oblast	No. 83	Oleksandr Shevchenko	Independent	2014	2014	Born 8 April 1971 (age 55)
Ivano-Frankivsk Oblast	No. 84	Volodymyr Kupchak	Batkivshchyna	2012	2014	Born 7 April 1978 (age 48)
Ivano-Frankivsk Oblast	No. 85	Olha Sikora	Batkivshchyna	2012	2014	Born 24 July 1961 (age 65)
Ivano-Frankivsk Oblast	No. 86	Anatoliy Dyriv	Batkivshchyna	2012	2014	Born 1 February 1970 (age 56)
Ivano-Frankivsk Oblast	No. 87	Yuriy Derevyanko	Independent	2012	2014	Born 7 May 1973 (age 53)
Ivano-Frankivsk Oblast	No. 88	Oles Donii	Sovereign European Ukraine	2007	2014	Born 13 August 1969 (age 57)
Ivano-Frankivsk Oblast	No. 89	Vasyl Hladii	Batkivshchyna	2012	2014	Born 23 May 1972 (age 54)
Kyiv Oblast	No. 90	Vitalii Chudnovskyi	Independent	2006	2014	Born 8 November 1969 (age 56)
Kyiv Oblast	No. 91	Ruslan Solvar	Ukrainian Democratic Alliance for Reform	2012	2014	Born 12 May 1971 (age 55)
Kyiv Oblast	No. 92	Serhii Katsuba	Party of Regions	2012	2014	Born 20 November 1978 (age 47)
Kyiv Oblast	No. 93	Oleksandr Onyshchenko	Party of Regions	2012	2014	Born 1 April 1969 (age 57)
Kyiv Oblast	No. 94	Ruslan Badaiev	Sovereign European Ukraine (Note: Elected as a member of the Party of Regions.)	2012	2014	Born 1 May 1972 (age 54)
Kyiv Oblast	No. 95	Viacheslav Kutovyi	Batkivshchyna	2012	2014	Born 24 April 1971 (age 55)
Kyiv Oblast	No. 96	Yaroslav Moskalenko	Sovereign European Ukraine	2012	2014	Born 28 April 1975 (age 51)
Kyiv Oblast	No. 97	Pavlo Rizanenko	Ukrainian Democratic Alliance for Reform	2012	2014	Born 12 July 1975 (age 51)
Kyiv Oblast	No. 98	Serhiy Mishchenko	Independent	2006	2014	Born 13 August 1971 (age 55)
Kirovohrad Oblast	No. 99	Andrii Tabalov	Batkivshchyna	2012	2014	Born 8 January 1978 (age 48)
Kirovohrad Oblast	No. 100	Stanislav Berezkin	Party of Regions	2012	2014	Born 12 May 1959 (age 67)
Kirovohrad Oblast	No. 101	Vitalii Hrushevskyi	Party of Regions	2012	2014	Born 12 April 1971 (age 55)
Kirovohrad Oblast	No. 102	Oleksandr Yedin	Party of Regions	2012	2014	Born 17 May 1960 (age 66)
Kirovohrad Oblast	No. 103	Serhiy Kuzmenko	Party of Regions	2012	2014	Born 22 January 1975 (age 51)
Luhansk Oblast	No. 104	Volodymyr Struk	Party of Regions	2012	2014	12 May 1964 – 22 March 2022 (aged 57)
Luhansk Oblast	No. 105	Serhii Horokhov	Party of Regions	2012	2014	Born 20 December 1974 (age 51)
Luhansk Oblast	No. 106	Oleksii Kunchenko	Party of Regions	2010	2014	Born 23 December 1952 (age 73)
Luhansk Oblast	No. 107	Serhiy Dunaiev	Party of Regions	2012	2014	Born 19 August 1973 (age 53)
Luhansk Oblast	No. 108	Valerii Moshenskyi	Sovereign European Ukraine	2012	2014	Born 1 June 1957 (age 69)
Luhansk Oblast	No. 109	Volodymyr Medianyk	Party of Regions	2012	2014	Born 13 June 1970 (age 56)
Luhansk Oblast	No. 110	Volodymyr Chub	Party of Regions	2012	2014	Born 30 September 1956 (age 70)
Luhansk Oblast	No. 111	Oleksandr Koval	Party of Regions	2012	2014	Born 27 December 1959 (age 66)
Luhansk Oblast	No. 112	Yuliy Ioffe	Party of Regions	2012	2014	Born 10 December 1940 (age 85)
Luhansk Oblast	No. 113	Viktor Tikhonov	Party of Regions	2012	2014	5 March 1949 – 29 August 2020 (aged 71)
Luhansk Oblast	No. 114	Volodymyr Demishkan	Party of Regions	2012	2014	Born 16 November 1949 (age 76)
Lviv Oblast	No. 115	Mykhailo Khmil	Batkivshchyna	2012	2014	Born 11 May 1973 (age 53)
Lviv Oblast	No. 116	Iryna Farion	Svoboda	2012	2014	Born 29 April 1964 (age 62)
Lviv Oblast	No. 117	Ihor Vasiunyk	Batkivshchyna	2012	2014	Born 1 August 1969 (age 57)
Lviv Oblast	No. 118	Yurii Mykhalchyshyn	Svoboda	2012	2014	Born 14 November 1982 (age 43)
Lviv Oblast	No. 119	Iryna Sekh	Svoboda	2012	2014	Born 20 September 1970 (age 56)
Lviv Oblast	No. 120	Yaroslav Dubnevych	Independent	2012	2014	Born 7 August 1969 (age 57)
Lviv Oblast	No. 121	Roman Ilyk	Batkivshchyna	2012	2014	Born 14 November 1963 (age 62)
Lviv Oblast	No. 122	Vasyl Pazyniak	Batkivshchyna	2012	2014	Born 26 June 1966 (age 60)
Lviv Oblast	No. 123	Lidia Koteliak	Batkivshchyna	2012	2014	Born 13 January 1963 (age 63)
Lviv Oblast	No. 124	Stepan Kurpil	Batkivshchyna	2006	2014	Born 23 July 1959 (age 67)
Lviv Oblast	No. 125	Andrii Tiahnybok	Svoboda	2012	2014	Born 26 February 1973 (age 53)
Lviv Oblast	No. 126	Oleh Kanivets	Batkivshchyna (Note: Independent from 4 April 2013.)	2012	2014	Born 3 June 1963 (age 63)
Mykolaiv Oblast	No. 127	Volodymyr Nakonechnyi	Party of Regions	2012	2014	Born 20 June 1952 (age 74)
Mykolaiv Oblast	No. 128	Artem Iliuk	Party of Regions	2012	2014	Born 17 April 1979 (age 47)
Mykolaiv Oblast	No. 129	Mykola Zhuk	Party of Regions	2012	2014	Born 26 November 1976 (age 49)
Mykolaiv Oblast	No. 130	Ihor Brychenko	Batkivshchyna	2012	2014	Born 7 July 1970 (age 56)
Mykolaiv Oblast	No. 131	Yurii Herzhov	Party of Regions	2012	2014	Born 29 September 1950 (age 76)
Mykolaiv Oblast	No. 132	Vitalii Travianko	Party of Regions	2012	2014	Born 22 July 1958 (age 68)
Mykolaiv Oblast	No. 132	Mykola Kruhlov	Independent	2014	2014	Born 10 November 1950 (age 75)
Odesa Oblast	No. 133	Ihor Markov	Party of Regions	2012	2013	Born 27 April 1963 (age 63)
Odesa Oblast	No. 134	Serhiy Hrynevetskyi	People's Party	2012	2014	Born 25 September 1957 (age 69)
Odesa Oblast	No. 135	Serhiy Kivalov	Opposition Bloc	1998	2014	Born 1 May 1954 (age 72)
Odesa Oblast	No. 136	Gennadiy Trukhanov	Party of Regions	2012	2014	Born 17 January 1965 (age 61)
Odesa Oblast	No. 137	Leonid Klimov	Party of Regions	2002	2014	Born 31 March 1953 (age 73)
Odesa Oblast	No. 138	Ivan Fursin	Party of Regions	2012	2014	Born 16 September 1971 (age 55)
Odesa Oblast	No. 139	Oleksandr Presman	Party of Regions	2012	2014	Born 10 April 1961 (age 65)
Odesa Oblast	No. 140	Davyd Zhvania	Party of Regions (Note: Independent from 30 November 2013.)	2012	2014	20 July 1967 – 9 May 2022 (aged 54)
Odesa Oblast	No. 141	Vitaly Barvinenko	Party of Regions	2011	2014	Born 3 June 1981 (age 45)
Odesa Oblast	No. 142	Anton Kisse	Independent	2012	2014	Born 10 October 1958 (age 68)
Odesa Oblast	No. 143	Yurii Kruk	Party of Regions	2012	2014	Born 2 June 1941 (age 85)
Poltava Oblast	No. 144	Serhiy Kaplin	Ukrainian Democratic Alliance for Reform	2012	2014	Born 15 December 1979 (age 46)
Poltava Oblast	No. 145	Yuriy Bublyk	Svoboda	2012	2014	Born 1 December 1973 (age 52)
Poltava Oblast	No. 146	Yurii Shapovalov	Party of Regions	2012	2014	Born 14 March 1972 (age 54)
Poltava Oblast	No. 147	Oleh Kulinich	Party of Regions	2012	2014	Born 25 November 1966 (age 59)
Poltava Oblast	No. 148	Volodymyr Pylypenko	Party of Regions	2008	2014	Born 27 July 1977 (age 49)
Poltava Oblast	No. 149	Oleksii Leliuk	Party of Regions	2012	2014	Born 30 November 1969 (age 56)
Poltava Oblast	No. 150	Kostyantyn Zhevago	Independent	1998	2014	Born 7 January 1974 (age 52)
Poltava Oblast	No. 151	Taras Kutovyi	Ukrainian Democratic Alliance for Reform	2012	2014	Born 25 February 1976 (age 50)
Rivne Oblast	No. 152	Oleh Osukhovskyi	Svoboda	2012	2014	Born 18 June 1978 (age 48)
Rivne Oblast	No. 153	Yuriy Vozniuk	Batkivshchyna	2012	2014	Born 31 January 1980 (age 46)
Rivne Oblast	No. 154	Valentyn Koroliuk	Batkivshchyna	2012	2014	Born 18 November 1963 (age 62)
Rivne Oblast	No. 155	Mykola Soroka	Party of Regions	2012	2014	Born 5 August 1952 (age 74)
Rivne Oblast	No. 156	Mykola Kucheruk	Batkivshchyna	2012	2014	Born 29 May 1960 (age 66)
Sumy Oblast	No. 157	Oleh Medunytsia	Batkivshchyna	2012	2014	Born 27 August 1971 (age 55)
Sumy Oblast	No. 158	Oleksandr Volkov	Party of Regions	2012	2014	Born 30 April 1948 (age 78)
Sumy Oblast	No. 159	Andrii Derkach	Party of Regions	2007	2014	Born 19 August 1967 (age 59)
Sumy Oblast	No. 160	Ihor Molotok	Sovereign European Ukraine	2012	2014	Born 4 September 1967 (age 59)
Sumy Oblast	No. 161	Volodymyr Shulha	Batkivshchyna	2012	2014	Born 29 March 1973 (age 53)
Sumy Oblast	No. 162	Iryna Kupreychyk	Batkivshchyna	2012	2014	Born 12 June 1971 (age 55)
Ternopil Oblast	No. 163	Oleksii Kaida	Svoboda	2012	2014	Born 27 February 1971 (age 55)
Ternopil Oblast	No. 164	Mykhailo Holovko	Svoboda	2012	2014	Born 3 May 1983 (age 43)
Ternopil Oblast	No. 165	Volodymyr Boiko	Batkivshchyna	2012	2014	Born 16 February 1985 (age 41)
Ternopil Oblast	No. 166	Mykhailo Apostol	Batkivshchyna	2012	2014	Born 1 January 1961 (age 65)
Ternopil Oblast	No. 167	Ivan Stoiko	Batkivshchyna	2007	2014	Born 27 April 1961 (age 65)
Kharkiv Oblast	No. 168	Valeriy Pysarenko	Party of Regions	2006	2014	Born 8 August 1980 (age 46)
Kharkiv Oblast	No. 169	Irina Berezhna	Party of Regions	2012	2014	13 August 1980 – 5 August 2017 (aged 36)
Kharkiv Oblast	No. 170	Dmytro Svyatash	Party of Regions	2012	2014	Born 15 June 1971 (age 55)
Kharkiv Oblast	No. 171	Iryna Horina	Party of Regions	2007	2014	Born 10 January 1967 (age 59)
Kharkiv Oblast	No. 172	Volodymyr Mysyk	Party of Regions	2012	2014	Born 31 January 1965 (age 61)
Kharkiv Oblast	No. 173	Anatoliy Denysenko	Party of Regions	2012	2014	Born 10 March 1971 (age 55)
Kharkiv Oblast	No. 174	Oleksandr Feldman	Party of Regions	2012	2014	Born 6 January 1960 (age 66)
Kharkiv Oblast	No. 175	Volodymyr Katsuba	Party of Regions	2012	2014	Born 14 August 1957 (age 69)
Kharkiv Oblast	No. 176	Dmytro Shentsev	Party of Regions	2012	2014	Born 28 November 1964 (age 61)
Kharkiv Oblast	No. 177	Viktor Ostapchuk	Party of Regions	2012	2014	Born 16 May 1955 (age 71)
Kharkiv Oblast	No. 178	Dmytro Dobkin	Party of Regions	2012	2014	Born 8 January 1975 (age 51)
Kharkiv Oblast	No. 179	Anatoliy Hirshfeld	Party of Regions	2012	2014	Born 7 August 1947 (age 79)
Kharkiv Oblast	No. 180	Oleksandr Bilovol	Party of Regions	2002	2014	Born 11 January 1962 (age 64)
Kharkiv Oblast	No. 181	Yevhen Murayev	Party of Regions	2012	2014	Born 2 December 1976 (age 49)
Kherson Oblast	No. 182	Vladimir Saldo	Party of Regions	2012	2014	Born 12 June 1956 (age 70)
Kherson Oblast	No. 183	Andrii Putilov	Ukrainian Democratic Alliance for Reform	2012	2014	Born 7 July 1971 (age 55)
Kherson Oblast	No. 184	Mykola Dmytruk	Party of Regions	2012	2014	23 February 1961 – 21 August 2021 (aged 60)
Kherson Oblast	No. 185	Mykhailo Opanashchenko	Party of Regions	2012	2014	Born 12 December 1977 (age 48)
Kherson Oblast	No. 186	Fedir Nehoi	Independent	2012	2014	Born 9 March 1958 (age 68)
Khmelnytskyi Oblast	No. 187	Oleh Lukashuk	Batkivshchyna	2002	2014	Born 1 June 1951 (age 75)
Khmelnytskyi Oblast	No. 188	Serhiy Labaziuk	Independent	2012	2014	Born 4 June 1980 (age 46)
Khmelnytskyi Oblast	No. 189	Ihor Sabii	Svoboda	2012	2014	Born 4 September 1976 (age 50)
Khmelnytskyi Oblast	No. 190	Serhii Buriak	Party of Regions	1995	2014	Born 1 April 1966 (age 60)
Khmelnytskyi Oblast	No. 191	Viktor Bondar	Party of Regions	2012	2014	Born 5 November 1975 (age 51)
Khmelnytskyi Oblast	No. 192	Oleksandr Hereha	Party of Regions	2012	2014	Born 27 June 1967 (age 59)
Khmelnytskyi Oblast	No. 193	Volodymyr Melnychenko	Party of Regions	2012	2014	Born 1 February 1965 (age 61)
Cherkasy Oblast	No. 194	Mykhailo Poplavskyi	Sovereign European Ukraine	2012	2014	Born 28 November 1949 (age 76)
Cherkasy Oblast	No. 195	Volodymyr Zubyk	Independent	2006	2014	Born 28 February 1958 (age 68)
Cherkasy Oblast	No. 196	Hennadiy Bobov	Party of Regions	2012	2014	Born 15 November 1965 (age 60)
Cherkasy Oblast	No. 197	Leonid Datsenko	Batkivshchyna	2012	2014	Born 28 July 1963 (age 63)
Cherkasy Oblast	No. 198	Viktor Tymoshenko	Independent	2012	2014	Born 13 September 1969 (age 57)
Cherkasy Oblast	No. 199	Valentyn Nychyporenko	Party of Regions	2012	2014	Born 25 February 1961 (age 65)
Cherkasy Oblast	No. 200	Anton Yatsenko	Party of Regions	2007	2014	Born 13 July 1977 (age 49)
Chernivtsi Oblast	No. 201	Mykola Fedoruk	Batkivshchyna	2012	2014	Born 20 March 1954 (age 72)
Chernivtsi Oblast	No. 202	Oleksandr Fyshchuk	Batkivshchyna	2012	2014	Born 12 January 1958 (age 68)
Chernivtsi Oblast	No. 203	Hennadii Fedoriak	Party of Regions	2012	2014	Born 13 July 1966 (age 60)
Chernivtsi Oblast	No. 204	Artem Semeniuk	Party of Regions	2012	2014	Born 8 August 1983 (age 43)
Chernihiv Oblast	No. 205	Valeriy Dubil	Batkivshchyna	2008	2014	Born 26 September 1973 (age 53)
Chernihiv Oblast	No. 206	Vladyslav Atroshenko	Party of Regions	2012	2014	Born 5 December 1968 (age 57)
Chernihiv Oblast	No. 207	Ihor Rybakov	Independent	2002	2014	Born 14 August 1976 (age 50)
Chernihiv Oblast	No. 208	Oleh Liashko	Radical Party of Oleh Liashko	2012	2014	Born 3 December 1972 (age 53)
Chernihiv Oblast	No. 209	Ivan Kurovskyi	Party of Regions	2007	2014	Born 28 June 1951 (age 75)
Chernihiv Oblast	No. 210	Mykola Rudkovskyi	Party of Regions	2012	2014	Born 18 December 1967 (age 58)
Kyiv	No. 211	Serhiy Teryokhin	Batkivshchyna	2006	2014	Born 29 September 1963 (age 63)
Kyiv	No. 212	Vitaly Yarema	Batkivshchyna	2012	2014	Born 14 October 1963 (age 63)
Kyiv	No. 213	Volodymyr Yavorivsky	Batkivshchyna	1990	2014	11 October 1942 – 16 April 2021 (aged 78)
Kyiv	No. 214	Viktor Chumak	Ukrainian Democratic Alliance for Reform	2012	2014	Born 5 June 1958 (age 68)
Kyiv	No. 215	Andriy Illienko	Svoboda	2012	2014	Born 24 June 1987 (age 39)
Kyiv	No. 216	Kseniya Lyapina	Batkivshchyna	2005	2014	Born 5 May 1964 (age 62)
Kyiv	No. 217	Oleksandr Bryhynets	Batkivshchyna	2012	2014	Born 14 April 1962 (age 64)
Kyiv	No. 218	Volodymyr Ariev	Batkivshchyna	2012	2014	Born 31 March 1975 (age 51)
Kyiv	No. 219	Volodymyr Bondarenko	Batkivshchyna	2012	2014	4 December 1952 – 24 August 2021 (aged 68)
Kyiv	No. 220	Oleksandr Chornovolenko	Batkivshchyna	1998	2014	Born 28 March 1955 (age 71)
Kyiv	No. 221	Leonid Yemets	Batkivshchyna	2012	2014	Born 30 August 1979 (age 47)
Kyiv	No. 222	Dmytro Andriyevskyi	Batkivshchyna	2012	2014	Born 6 January 1967 (age 59)
Kyiv	No. 223	Viktor Pylypyshyn	Sovereign European Ukraine	2012	2014	Born 6 April 1961 (age 65)
Sevastopol	No. 224	Pavlo Lebedyev	Party of Regions	2006	2013	Born 12 July 1962 (age 64)
Sevastopol	No. 224	Vadym Novynskyi	Party of Regions	2013	2014	Born 3 June 1963 (age 63)
Sevastopol	No. 225	Vadym Kolesnichenko	Party of Regions	2007	2014	Born 12 July 1962 (age 64)

=== Single-mandate constituencies ===
==== Autonomous Republic of Crimea ====
Those representing Autonomous Republic of Crimea consisted of nine deputies from the Party of Regions and one from Union.

1. Vitalina Dzoz (R)
2. Lev Mirimsky (Union, not member of a faction)
3. Olena Netetska (R)
4. Oleh Paraskiv (R)
5. Valentina Lyutikova (R)
6. Yuliya Lyovochkina (R)
7. Serhiy Braiko (R)
8. Borys Deich (R)
9. Oleksandr Nechayev (R)
10. Hryhoriy Hruba (R)

==== Cherkasy Oblast ====
Those representing Cherkasy Oblast consisted of four deputies from the Party of Regions, one Independent, and two disputed constituencies.

1. Disputed
2. Volodymyr Zubyk (R, elected as an independent)
3. Hennadiy Bobov (R)
4. Disputed
5. Viktor Tymoshenko (I, not member of a faction)
6. Valentyn Nychyporenko (R, elected as an independent)
7. Anton Yatsenko (R)

==== Chernihiv Oblast ====
Those representing Chernihiv Oblast consisted of three deputies form the Party of Regions, one Independent, one from Fatherland, and one from the Radical Party of Oleh Lyashko.

1. Valeriy Dubil (Fa)
2. Vladyslav Atroshenko (R, elected as an independent)
3. Ihor Rybakov (I, not member of a faction)
4. Oleh Lyashko (Rad, not member of a faction)
5. Ivan Kurovsky (R, elected as an independent)
6. Mykola Rudkovsky (R, elected as an independent)

=== Changes in membership ===
On 18 March 2013, the Central Election Commission of Ukraine registered Roman Stadniychuk of Batkivschyna and Oleksandr Kozub of Party of Regions as people's deputies in place of Andrey Verevskiy and Serhiy Vlasenko.

In June 2013 people's deputies of Batkivschyna claimed they had been offered bribes of $2 million to $6 million for leaving the parties parliamentary faction, becoming member of the Party of Regions faction or for voting for legislation proposed by it.

== Parliamentary factions and deputy groups summary ==
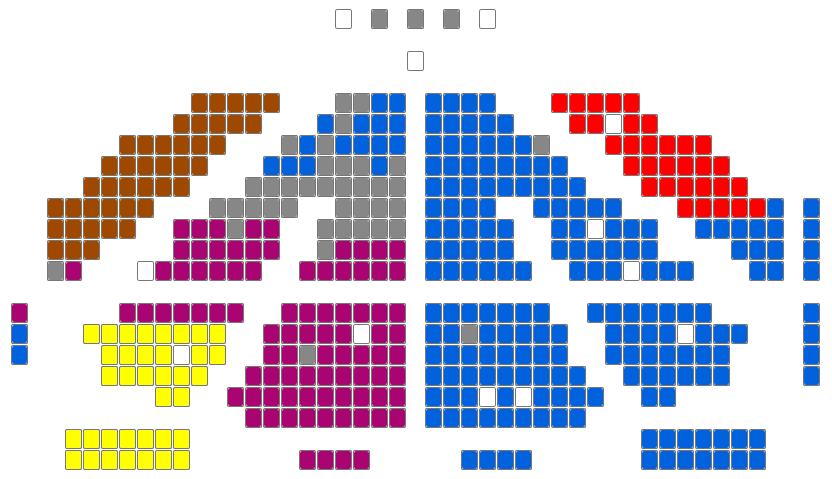
Location of parliamentary factions in the 7th Verkhovna Rada on July 1, 2014: – 95 Non-affiliated – 86 Fatherland – 78 Party of Regions / – 41 UDAR – 40 Economic Development – 36 Freedom / – 35 Sovereign European Ukraine – 34 For Peace and Stability

	Party (Shading indicates majority caucus)									Total	Vacant
	Party of Regions	Batkivshchyna	UDAR	Svoboda	Communists	Economic Development	Sovereign European Ukraine	For Peace and Stability	Non-affiliated (Note: The United Centre (3 seats), People's Party (2 seats), Radical Party of Oleh Liashko (1 seat) and Union (1 seat) did not form their own faction. Their deputies did not join any faction besides 1 deputy of People's Party who became a member of the Party of Regions faction in December 2012 and Union's deputy joined the then newly created faction For Peace and Stability on 2 July 2014.)	Total	Vacant
End of previous convocation	195	97	DNP	DNP	25	DNP	DNP	DNP	31	348	102
Begin	185	101	40	37	32	-	-	-	43	438	12
12 December 2012	208	99	42	36	32	-	-	-	27	444	6
11 June 2013	207	93	42	36	32	-	-	-	34	444	6
31 December 2013	204	90	42	36	32	-	-	-	38	442	8
21 February 2014	177	90	42	36	32	-	-	-	55	442	8
22 February 2014	134	88	42	36	32	-	-	-	115	447	3
23 February 2014	131	88	42	36	32	-	-	-	118	447	3
24 February 2014	128	88	42	36	32	-	-	-	123	449	1
25 February 2014	127	88	42	36	32	33	-	-	91	449	1
27 February 2014	122	88	42	36	32	32	37	-	60	449	1
28 February 2014	122	88	42	36	32	36	36	-	57	449	1
4 March 2014	119	87	42	33	32	36	36	-	60	445	5
15 March 2014	120	88	42	35	32	37	36	-	58	448	2
18 March 2014	120	82	41	33	32	37	36	-	58	439	11
25 March 2014	120	88	41	35	32	37	36	-	58	447	3
8 April 2014	109	88	41	34	33	38	36	-	68	446	4
10 April 2014	108	88	41	35	33	38	36	-	70	449	1
11 April 2014	106	88	42	35	33	37	36	-	71	448	2
20 April 2014	104	88	41	35	33	37	36	-	72	446	4
16 May 2014	103	88	41	35	33	39	35	-	73	447	3
29 May 2014	103	87	41	35	31	40	35	-	74	446	4
6 June 2014	80	85	40	35	32	40	35	-	95	442	8
1 July 2014	80	86	41	35	24	40	35	-	104	445	5
2 July 2014	80	86	41	35	24	40	35	32	73	445	5
4 July 2014	78	86	41	35	23	40	35	34	73	445	5
24 July 2014	78	86	41	35	(Note: The Communist Party of Ukraine faction was dissolved 24 July 2014 two days after parliament had changed its regulations.)	41	35	34	95	445	5
25 July 2014	78	86	41	35	-	41	35	36	93	445	5
Latest voting share	17.5%	19.3%	9.2%	7.9%	0.0%	9.2%	7.9%	8.1%	20.9%		

The ruling majority (225+ votes) is "situational" and officially consists of Party of Regions and most unaffiliated members. Communists are officially in opposition to everyone but its parliamentary faction usually votes exactly the same as the Party of Regions parliamentary faction. The parliamentary opposition includes UDAR, Fatherland and Freedom and other unaffiliated members.

== See also ==
- Second Azarov Government
- First Yatsenyuk Government
