= Vitiv =

Vitiv is a surname. Notable people with the surname include:

- Anatoliy Vitiv (born 1960), Ukrainian politician
- Ihor Vitiv (born 1984), Ukrainian footballer
