= Oleksandr Mochkov =

Ukrainian politician

Oleksandr Mochkov Олександр Мочков
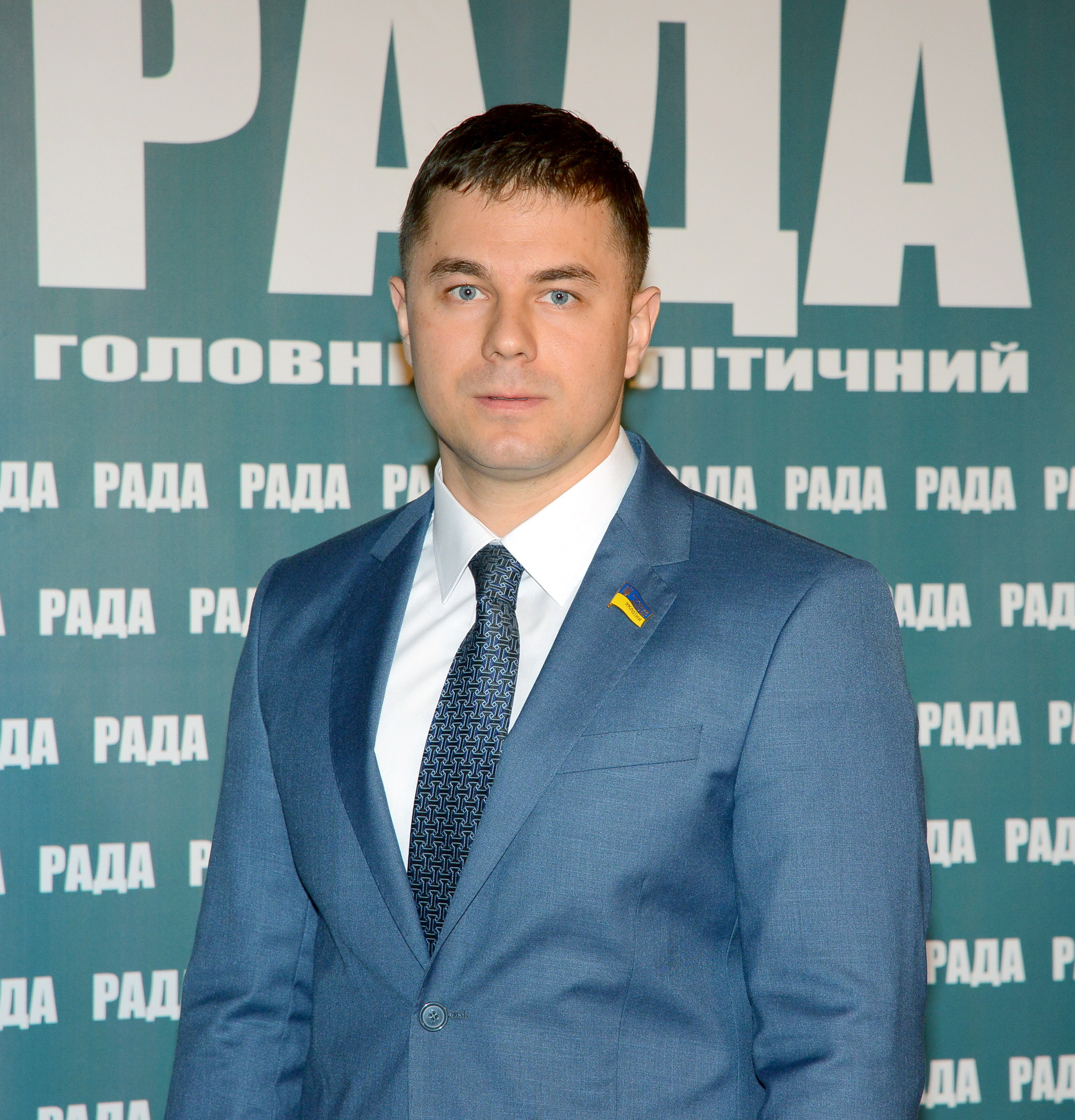

Personal details
- Born: 27 May 1981 (age 44) Khmilnyk, Vinnytsia Oblast, Ukrainian SSR
- Party: Ukrainian Democratic Alliance for Reform

Oleksandr Mochkov (Ukrainian: Мочков Олександр Борисович ; born May 27, 1981) is a Ukrainian politician. He is a People's Deputy of Ukraine of the 7th Ukrainian Verkhovna Rada.

== Bibliography ==
He was born on May 27, 1981, in Khmilnyk, Vinnytsia Oblast. In 1998 he graduated from secondary school № 11 in Jalta, Crimea.

- In 2003 he graduated from Jalta Institute of Management and got a qualification of the Master of Finances.
- In 2003 he passed the exam and was classed as a specialist in paper security trade in Crimean Institute of Economy and Business Law, in the training center of stock market.
- In 2003 he had military training at the Department of Military Igor Sikorsky Kyiv Polytechnic Institute. He sworn the Ukrainian peoples fealty in his military oath on July 5, 2003. A reserve officer.
- In 2008 he graduated from National Academy for Public Administration under the President of Ukraine (Kyiv), and got the second higher education as a Master of state management.
- Since 2013 up to now – studying in postgraduate department at National Academy for Public Administration under the President of Ukraine.

== Work activity ==
- In 2003 – an expert in paper circulation sector of corporative business.
- 2004 – 2005 – a leading economist at the Department of card production of corporation clients in Yalta’s PrivatBank constituent.
- In 2005 worked at LTD «Каskad».
- 2005 – 2006 – takes the post of financial director of LTD «Evas-Allience».
- 2007 – 2012 – a private entrepreneur.
- 2008 – 2012 – the founder and director of LTD «Kryminvest groups of the XXI century».
- 2009 – 2014 – the President of “Yalta Center of Social and Political Investigations».

== Political way ==
- 2002 – 2012 – a deputy of tree convocations of Massandra settlement council of Autonomous Republic of Crimea .
- Since December 12, 2012 – he is a deputy of Ukraine of the VIIth convocation, elected according to general state on multi-mandate constituency from political party «UDAR (Ukrainian Democratic Alliance for the reforms) by Vitaliy Klichko», number 33 in the list.
- Deputy Head of special commission of the Verkhovna Rada of Ukraine on the questions of Autonomous Republic Crimea.
- Secretary of the Verkhovna Rada Committee of Ukraine on questions of informational support and information technologies.

For this period of time in Autonomous Republic Crimea 18 public receiving rooms were opened where the work with the Crimean peninsula citizens was permanently done. Total number of the people who came to the public receiving room is 2569 people. There were both collective and individual petitions. Mainly people came to get a consultation of law character, the questions connected with privileges forming, material help, pensions, land plots.

- In 2014 – to people deputies of Ukraine from political party Petro Poroshenko Bloc "Solidarity", №97 in the party list.
- In 2014 – Political Party “Udar” member (Ukrainian Democratic Alliance for reforms) by Vitaliy Klichko and a chairman of the Crimean republic organization.
- In 2014 – an agent of Poroshenko Petro Oleksiiovych – a candidate to the post of Ukraine’s President in territory electoral precinct №159.
- In 2015 – the Minister of Social Politics of Ukraine on social ground.
- Since October 28, 2015, up to now – advising assistant of people’s deputy of Ukraine.
- In 2016 he is a member of the initiative group on special political platform “Volna”, a member of nomination committee. Later that year he joined the new political party Movement of New Forces.

== Euromaidan ==
- On November 21, 2013, he helped Crimean activists who came to the Euromaidan. He carried the slogan “The Crimea is Ukraine”.
- December 7, 2013, in the central square of Simferopil opposite the building of Ministers Council of Autonomous Republic of Crimea in the frames of Euromaidan-Crimea», people’s deputy of Ukraine Oleksandr Mochkov, hold the action - «Stand Up, Crimea!». More than 500 people took part in the action.

== Family ==
Wife – Mochkova Lilia, daughters Anna-Maria (2009) and Anastasiya-Victoria (2014).

== Sport, hobbies ==
- Master of Sports in Ukraine in Sambo fighting.
- Fitness, cross fit, diving, free diving, open water swimming.
- Master of Sports in Ukraine in Sambo fighting.
- Fitness, cross fit, diving, free diving, open water swimming.
