= Larysa Baidyuk =

Ukrainian politician (born 1951)

- Лариса Байдюк
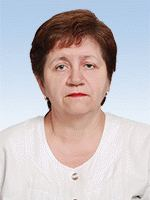
- Official Verkhovna Rada portrait, 2012

People's Deputy of Ukraine
- In office 12 December 2012 – 27 November 2014

Personal details
- Born: 26 February 1951 (age 75) Rivne, Ukrainian SSR, Soviet Union
- Party: Communist Party of Ukraine

Larysa Makarivna Baidyuk (Ukrainian: Лариса Макарівна Байдюк; born 26 February 1951) is a Ukrainian politician, who served as the People's Deputy of Ukraine of the 7th convocation. A Member of the Communist Party of Ukraine since 1979, she was a member of the faction of the Communist Party of Ukraine in the Verkhovna Rada of Ukraine from December 2012.

Before, Baidyuk was the first secretary of the Lenin District Committee of the Communist Party of Sevastopol. She then was the Head of the council of the public organization "Women of Sevastopol for Peace and Social Justice".

== Early life and education ==
Larysa Baidyuk studied at the Faculty of Technology at Khmelnytskyi Technological Institute of Household Services (1968-1973), graduating as an Engineer-Economist.

== Career ==
From 1973 to 1978, Larysa Baidyuk worked as a senior economist in the planning and economic department of the Pobutekspress household service plant in Sevastopol. From 1978 to 1980, she was a senior price economist of the Sevastopol Department of Household Services planning department.

From 1980 to 1986 and 1988 to 1991, Baidyuk was a director of the Sevastopol factory of industrial sewing and repair of knitted products "Indtrikotazh". In 1986–1988, she was a Deputy Chairman of the executive committee of the Balaklava District Council of People's Deputies of Sevastopol.

From 1991 to 1995, Baidyuk was a director of the rental enterprise "Trikotazh" in Sevastopol. From 1995 to 1998, she was a chairman of the board of JSC Trikotazh, city of Sevastopol. From 1998 to 2002, Baidyuk served as the Chairman of the Lenin District Council of the city of Sevastopol.

From 2012 to 2014, Baidyuk was a People's Deputy of Ukraine of the 7th convocation. From 2015 to 2017, she headed the association of real estate owners “GARDENING NON-PROFIT COMPANY “HYDROGRAPH”.

After Russia annexed Crimea, she accepted Russian citizenship and joined the Communist Party of the Russian Federation. She became the first secretary of the Committee of the Lenin local branch of the Communist Party of Sevastopol.

In 2016, Baidyuk ran for deputy of the Council of the Leninsky Municipal District of the second convocation of Sevastopol.

=== Parliamentary Activity ===
Larysa Baidyuk was the People's Deputy of Ukraine of the 7th convocation from 12 December 2012, from the Communist Party of Ukraine, No. 24 on the list. At the time of the elections, she was an assistant consultant of the People's Deputy of Ukraine, a member of the Communist Party of Ukraine. Baidyuk was a member of the Budget Committee of the Verkhovna Rada of Ukraine of the 7th convocation since December 2012.

Baidyuk was one of the 148 deputies of the Verkhovna Rada of Ukraine who signed an appeal to the Sejm of the Republic of Poland with a request to recognize the events in Volyn from 1942 to 1944 as genocide of Poles.

She voted for the Anti-protest laws restricting freedom of speech and freedom of assembly in Ukraine passed by the Verkhovna Rada on 16 January 2014 (referred to as Black Thursday by its opponents) and signed into law by President Viktor Yanukovych the following day.
