= Ivan Myrnyi =

Ukrainian politician (born 1954)

- Іван Мирний
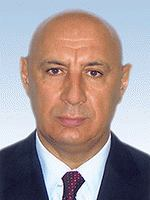
- Official portrait, 2014

People's Deputy of Ukraine
- In office 23 November 2007 – 29 August 2019

Personal details
- Born: Ivan Myrnyi; 6 July 1954 (age 72) Ruchky, Ukrainian SSR, Soviet Union (now Ukraine)
- Party: Opposition Bloc

Ivan Mykolaiovych Myrnyi (Ukrainian: Іван Миколайович Мирний; born 6 July 1954) is a Ukrainian politician who served as a People's Deputy of Ukraine in the 6th, 7th, and 8th Ukrainian Verkhovna Radas as a member of Party of Regions and Opposition Bloc.

== Biography ==
He was born on July 6, 1954, Ruchky Village, Hadiach Raion (now Myrhorod Raion), Poltava Oblast, USSR). From 1973 to 1975 — was serving in the Soviet Army. In 1987 — graduated from Law Enforcement Academy MIA USSR. From 1977 to 2002 — an inspector, a deputy manager of the Head of Criminal Investigation Department of District Executive Committee (Chernivtsi); The first Deputy Head of Department, a director of the Organized Crime Unit; The first Deputy Head of Department, a director of criminal police of Administration of Ministry of Internal Affairs in Chernivtsi Oblast. From 2002 to 2003 — a director's deputy manager of “Highrock Holding Limited” (Kyiv) firm representation. From 2005 to 2007 — a vice-president on general questions LLC with Foreign Investments of airline company «EES-Avia» (Kyiv).

== Parliament activity ==
- From 2007 to 2012 — a people's deputy of Ukraine of the VIth convocation for Party of Regions.

Post — the chairman of subcommittee on the matters of coordination with judicial bodies and activity coordination with state bodies participating in the organized criminality combat of the Verkhovna Rada of Ukraine Committee on the matters of combat with organized criminality and corruption.

- From 2012 to 2014 — a people's deputy of Ukraine of the 7th convocation again for Party of Regions.

Post — the chairman of subcommittee on the matters of cooperation between Ukraine and EU in the sphere of prevention and countermeasure of transnational criminality of the Verkhovna Rada of Ukraine Committee on the matters of European integration.

- Since 2014 — a people's deputy of Ukraine of the 8th convocation.
- Elected in: A multi-mandate nationwide district. Party: Political party "Opposition Bloc". Sequence number in the list: 18
- Faction: Member of the deputy faction of the Political party "Opposition Bloc". in the Verkhovna Rada of Ukraine of the eighth convocation.
- Post: Chairperson of the subcommittee on anti-corruption policy of the Verkhovna Rada of Ukraine Committee on Corruption Prevention and Counteraction.

Myrnyi was not re-elected to parliament in the 2019 Ukrainian parliamentary election because he did not take part in this election. He did was a member of the political council of Opposition Platform — For Life that did take part in this election (and won 37 seats).

== Family ==
Daughters: Tetiana (1980), Iryna (1985), Anastasia (2005).
