= Tetiana Sliuz =

Ukrainian politician (born 1965)

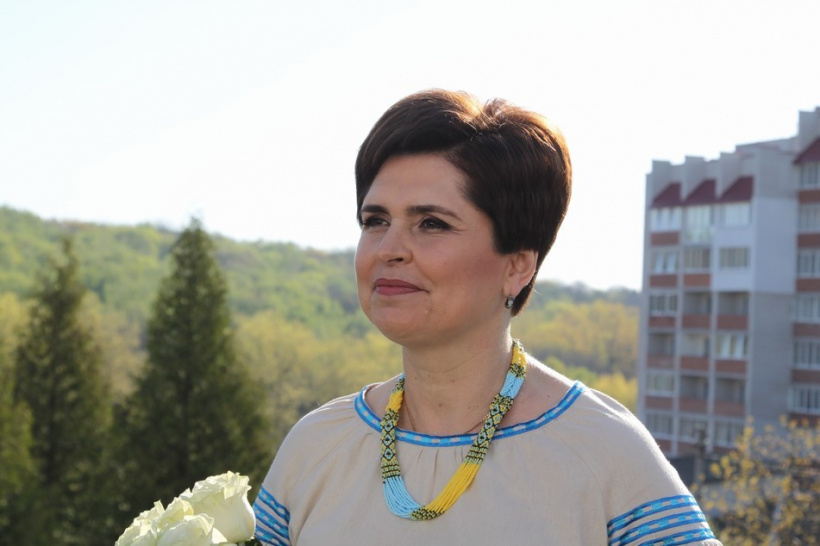
Tetiana Sliuz

Tetiana Yaroslavivna Sliuz (born 9 April 1965) is a Ukrainian civil servant and politician. Member of the All-Ukrainian Association "Batkivshchyna" party, a Central Control and Audit Commission member. Head of the State Treasury Service of Ukraine.

== Early life and education ==
Tetiana Sliuz studied at the Faculty of Economics at Ivan Franko Lviv State University (1982-1987) and later graduated from the Ternopil Academy of National Economy (2005).

== Career ==
From 1987 to 1989, Tetiana Sliuz worked as an Economist in the financial department of the Kamianka-Buzka district council executive committee of people's deputies of the Lviv region. Between 1990 and 2002, she was a State Tax Inspector, Chief State Tax Inspector, Deputy Chief, First Deputy Chief of the State Tax Inspectorate in the Kamianka-Buzka district, and the First Deputy Head of the Kamianka-Buzka Interdistrict Tax Inspection.

From 2002 to 2004, Sliuz was a Deputy Head of the Department of the State Tax Administration in the Lviv Region. She continued her career as a Deputy head of the State Tax Administration in the Ternopil region (2004-2005). In 2005, she became a deputy director of the Department of the Ministry of Finance of Ukraine.

In 2006, Sliuz was the Head of the Main Department of the State Treasury of Ukraine in Kyiv. From 2006 to 2007, she headed of department of the Ministry of Finance of Ukraine. From December 19, 2007, to March 11, 2010, Sliuz was the Head of the State Treasury of Ukraine.

Since December 12, 2012, she was a People's Deputy of Ukraine of the 7th convocation from the All-Ukrainian Union "Batkivshchyna" party as No. 53 on the list. Sliuz was a Member of the Budget Committee of the Verkhovna Rada of Ukraine and the Special Control Commission on Privatization.

On April 17, 2014, Sliuz again headed the State Treasury Service of Ukraine. On May 13, 2014, the Verkhovna Rada of Ukraine prematurely terminated the powers of the People's Deputy of Ukraine, Sliuz, based on her statement withdrawing her parliamentary powers. Sliuz is a Civil servant of the 1st rank (since 23.08.2014).

== Controversies ==
In April 2010, the Prosecutor General's Office opened a criminal case against Tetiana Sliuz on the charge of not returning UAH 800 million to participants in the competition for the privatization of the Odesa Port Plant. Later, she became a suspect in a criminal case regarding the misuse of Kyoto Protocol money and was declared wanted in December of the same year.
