= Yurii Boiarskyi =

Ukrainian politician and businessman (born 1960)

- Юрій Боярський
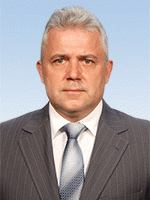
- An official portrait of him from 2012.

People's Deputy of Ukraine
- In office 12 December 2012 – 27 November 2014
- Constituency: Donetsk Oblast, No. 48

Personal details
- Born: Yurii Ivanovich Boiarskyi; 28 December 1960 (age 65) Krasnyi Lyman, Ukrainian SSR, Soviet Union (now Lyman, Ukraine)
- Party: Party of Regions (2012-2014)
- Education: Donetsk National Technical University (1983)

Yurii Ivanovich Boiarskyi (Ukrainian: Юрій Іванович Боярський; born 28 November 1960) is a Ukrainian politician and businessman who served as a People's Deputy of Ukraine in the Verkhovna Rada representing the 7th convocation from 2012 to its premature end in 2014 with the Party of Regions. He also directed the enterprise New Kramatorsk Machinebuilding Factory (NKMZ).

== Early life ==
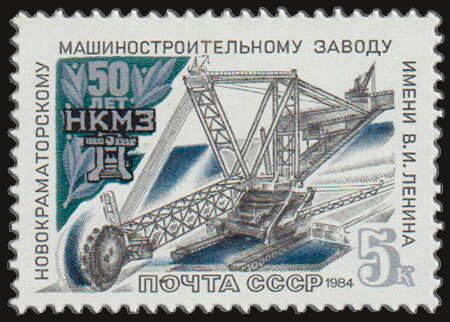
A 1984 Soviet postage stamp for "50 years of NKMZ". Boiarskyi was a longtime worker at NKMZ, and eventually directed it.

Boiarskyi was born on 28 November 1960 in the city of Krasnyi Lyman (now Lyman), which was then part of the Ukrainian SSR in the Soviet Union. After graduating from secondary school, he pursued higher education, graduating from the Donetsk National Technical University (then the Donetsk Polytechnic Institute) in 1983 with a specialisation as an engineer-economist, specifically in the economics and organisation of the machine-building industry. Afterwards, Boiarskyi immediately entered the industry and began working at the Kramatorsk Machine Tool Building Association in 1983. After two years, he left to work at the Centre for Scientific Organisation of Labour at the Ministry of Heavy Engineering of the USSR in 1985, but he did this very briefly before leaving in August 1986. He then became an engineer-economist at the electric steel smelting shop for the New Kramatorsk Machinebuilding Factory (NKMZ). Boiarskyi worked in this position for another seven years until 1993, after the collapse of the Soviet Union, when he was appointed Deputy Chief Accountant of NKMZ. He was then promoted to Deputy General Director for Commercial Affairs of NKMZ in 2001. After another six years in this position, he became Chief Accountant of NKMZ and then in 2012 was moved to Deputy General Director for Finance and Corporate Governance of NKMZ. In 2011, he also defended his thesis within the realm of accounting and audits and received the title of Candidate of Economic Sciences.

In December 2014, after the end of his parliamentary mandate, he became Deputy General Director for Economics and Finance. In September 2020, Boiarskyi was appointed general director of NKMZ to replace the longtime director, Georgiy Skudar who had headed the enterprise since 2007. He stepped down sometime later.

== Political career ==
In 2002, he was elected a deputy of the Kramatorsk City Council. He was continuously re-elected to the council, and eventually also became a member of the faction of the Party of Regions. In 2011, he was appointed Chairman of the Standing Committee on the Issues of Socio-Economic Development, Planning, Budget, and Finance. In 2012, Boiarskyi announced his candidacy for the upcoming 2012 Ukrainian parliamentary elections in the single-mandate constituency No. 48 with the Party of Regions. At the time of its formation, constituency No. 48 consisted mainly of the city of Kramatorsk and its surroundings. In its opinion, the Ukrainian newspaper Comment said Boiarskyi was not very popular and unknown to most of the residents of Kramatorsk. Instead, the newspaper suggested that most of Boiarskyi's popularity was leveraged through the backing of his former boss, a red director at NKMZ, who was also a people's deputy, Georgiy Skudar. Indeed, he was eventually elected with 55.12% of the vote, with Maksym Gorodensky of the Communist Party of Ukraine taking second place at 12.30% and Volodymyr Rzhavskyi of Batkivshchyna taking third at 11.68%. Upon joining the Rada, he joined the Party of Regions faction and was appointed as a member of the Committee on Industrial and Investment Policy. Towards the end of his mandate, he voted for the law that was adopted by the majority on amnesty for Euromaidan participants. After the premature end of the 7th convocation in 2014, he attempted to run again in the snap 2014 Ukrainian parliamentary elections within the same constituency as a self-nominated candidate, but was not selected. The election for the constituency was instead mainly a toss-up between Serhiy Bilznyuk and Maxim Efimov, which was far more competitive. This effectively ended his career in national politics. In 2015, however, locally he was appointed to the body of the city government of Kramatorsk.

== Personal life ==
He is married to Elena Gennadiyevna Boyarskaya, a native of nearby Druzhkivka, who also worked at NKMZ as the Head of the Planning and Economics Bureau. They have one son: Sergey, who was born in 1981. As of 2012, Boiarskyi resides in Kramatorsk.

== Honours and awards ==
Boiarskyi has been awarding the following honours:

- Honored Economist of Ukraine (2009)
