= Anatolii Honcharov =

Ukrainian politician and businessman (born 1949)

- Анатолій Гончаров
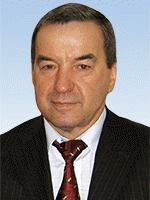
- An official portrait of him from 2012.

People's Deputy of Ukraine
- In office 12 December 2012 – 27 November 2014
- Constituency: Donetsk Oblast, No. 51

Personal details
- Born: Anatolii Dmitrievich Honcharov; 13 December 1949 (age 76) Komora (Gubkinsky District), Russian SFSR, Soviet Union
- Party: Party of Regions (2010-2014)
- Education: Donetsk National Technical University (1978)

Anatolii Dmitrievich Honcharov (Ukrainian: Анатолій Дмитрович Гончаров; born 13 December 1949) is a Russian-born Ukrainian politician and businessman who served as a People's Deputy of Ukraine in the Verkhovna Rada representing the 7th convocation from 2012 to its premature end in 2014 with the Party of Regions.

== Early life ==
Honcharov was born on 23 November 1949 in the village of Kladovoye (Gubkinsky District), which was then part of the Russian SFSR in the Soviet Union. After graduating from secondary school, he started working at the Gaevo mine in the city of Horlivka in 1969. Honcharov remained there for the majority of his career, going from underground electrician to foreman to head of the mining site to head of the trade union committee and then director. He also graduated from the Donetsk National Technical University (then the Donetsk Polytechnic Institute) in 1978 with a specialisation as a mining engineer and electrician.

In 2006, he finally left the enterprise when he accepted the job of general director of Artemvugol. In 2012, he confirmed that one of its main mines, the Lenin mine, of Artemvugol may be leased to a labour collective for a new horizon.

== Political career ==
In 2010, Honcharov first entered politics, becoming a deputy of the Donetsk Oblast Council from Horlivka with the Party of Regions. In 2012, during the 2012 Ukrainian parliamentary elections, Honcharov confirmed his candidacy to the Verkhovna Rada with the Party of Regions in the newly-formed constituency No. 51. No. 51 consisted of two of the three districts of Horliva: Mykytivskyi and Tsentralno-Miskyi, and there were a total of 150,387 eligible voters in the district. His election was not very controversial, and he was easily elected with 40.11% of the vote (27,460 people) against the self-nominated candidate Artur Gerasimov (12.24%) and the Batkivshchyna candidate Volodymyr Vesyolkin (11.81%). Upon joining the Rada, he immediately became a member of the Party of Regions faction and was elected 1st Deputy Chairman of the Committee for Pensioners, Veterans, and Disabled Persons.

In January 2014, during ongoing tensions due to Euromaidan, Honcharov addressed the Horlivka City Council, blaming the state of the media, particularly 5 Kanal, which was owned by Petro Poroshenko and was popularly associated with the opposition. He also said that Europe was merely upset over Yanukovych rejecting the European Union–Ukraine Association Agreement, and that it did not matter because Ukraine would eventually learn to adopt European standards. After Yanukovych eventually left Kyiv for Russia, Honcharov said in an exclusive interview, "I am not going to leave the Party of Regions. Not only at the present, but ever". He condemned the MPs who had left the party, calling them opportunists. He also said that Euromaidan was like the previous elections, that it had brought empty slogans and political instability, and that it had been exploiteed by radical groups like the Right Sector. He did, however, eventually leave the party for the widely described pro-Russian group "For Peace and Stability", which led to the then Chairman of the Verkhovna Rada, Oleksandr Turchynov, accusing him of supporting separatism and Russian aggression.

== Honours ==
Honcharov has been awarded the following honours:

- Honorary Citizen of Horlivka (for significant contribution to the coal industry, 2013)
