= Oleh Paraskiv =

Russian-Ukrainian politician (born 1966)

- Олег Парасків
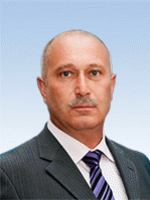
- An official photo of him from 2012.

People's Deputy of Ukraine
- In office 12 December 2012 – 27 November 2014
- Constituency: Autonomous Republic of Crimea, No. 4

Mayor of Myrnyi
- In office 26 March 2006 – 12 December 2012

Personal details
- Born: Oleh Dmytrovych Paraskiv; 14 April 1966 (age 60) Chernihiv, Ukrainian SSR, Soviet Union
- Party: Party of Regions (2012-2014)
- Education: Ushakov Baltic Higher Naval School (1988)

Military service
- Allegiance: Soviet Union (1988-1991)
- Branch/service: Soviet Navy
- Years of service: 1988-1993
- Rank: Reserve lieutenant commander
- Unit: Black Sea Fleet

Oleh Dmytrovych Paraskiv (Ukrainian: Олег Дмитрович Парасків; Russian: Олег Дмитриевич Параскив; born 14 April 1966) is a Russian and formerly Ukrainian politician who served as a People's Deputy of Ukraine in the Verkhovna Rada representing the 7th convocation from 2012 to its premature end in 2014 with the Party of Regions. Prior to this, he served as Mayor of the village of Myrnyi. During the 2014 Russian annexation of Crimea, he sided with Russia.

== Early life ==
Paraskiv was born on 14 April 1966 in the city of Chernihiv, which was then part of the Ukrainian SSR of the Soviet Union. After graduating from secondary school, he entered the Ushakov Baltic Higher Naval School in Kaliningrad, where he graduated in 1988 as a radio engineer. Afterwards, he served on a variety of reconnaissance ships as a commander of a special forces group with the Red Banner Black Sea Fleet and was assigned to combat campaigns with the 5th Operational Squadron in the Mediterranean Sea. In 1993, he left the navy with the rank of reserve lieutenant commander. Paraskiv then entered the business sector, serving as director of the enterprise PE "Niolan" until 1996. For two years afterwards, from 1996 to 1998, he was director of Styx LLC. He left in late 1998 to become Head of the Department of Tourism and Advertising for the City Executive Committee of Yevpatoria in Crimea, but he left after a little less than a year. From 1999 to 2006, he was then engaged in private entrepreneurial exercises. In an interview from 2012, he said that the entrepreneurial activities started in Myrnyi, but he also expanded outwards in Ukraine to Chernivtsi and Lviv, opening retail outlets and catering.

== Political career ==
=== 2006-2012: Mayor of Myrnyi ===
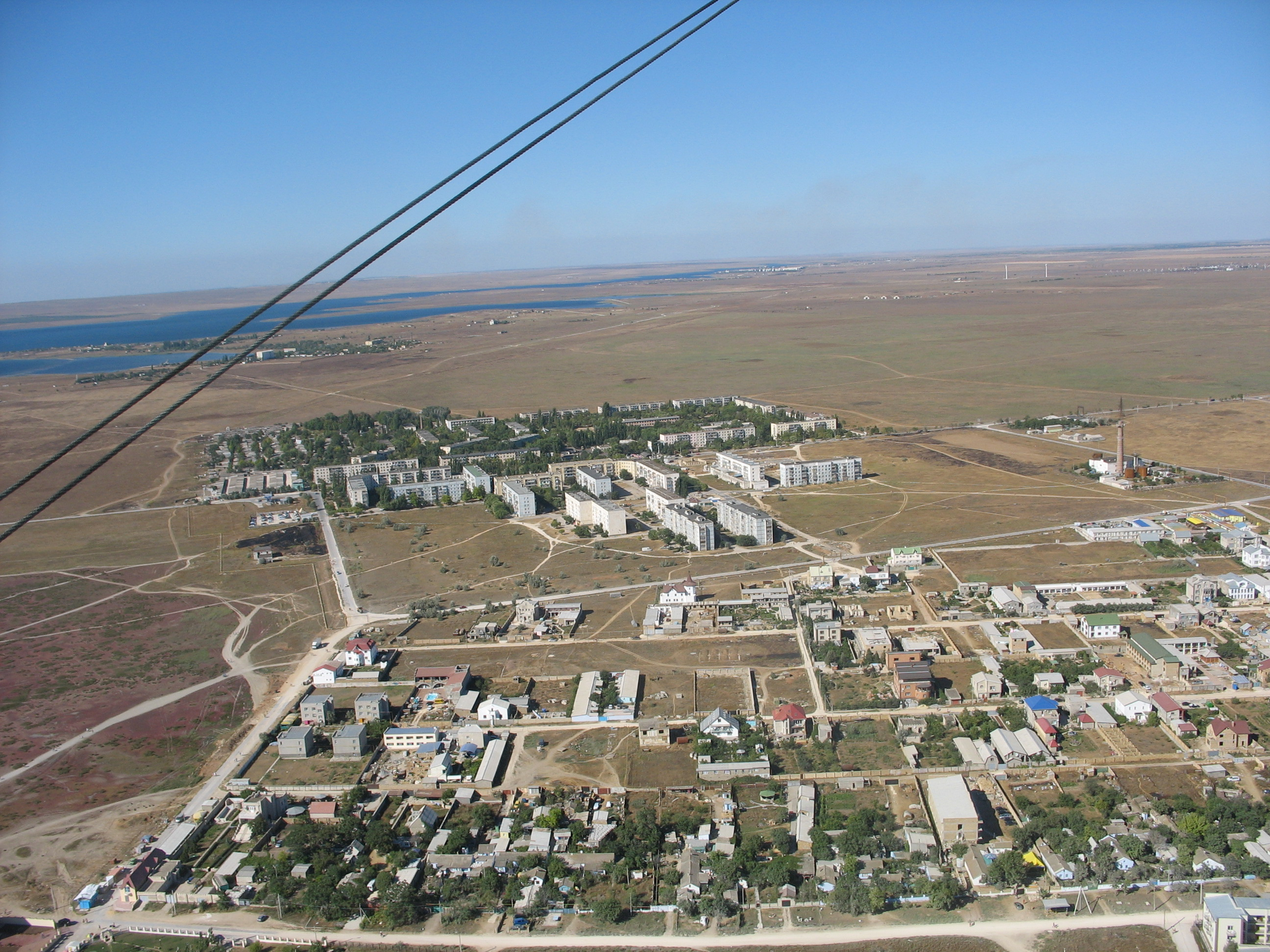
View of Myrynyi from above. He was mayor of the small village from 2006 to 2012, before entering national politics.

Paraskiv first entered politics in 1998 when he was elected a deputy to the village council of Myrnyi. He was elected twice and also became secretary of the council. In early 2006, his friend Anatoly Symonenko ran for the post of Mayor of Myrnyi, with Paraskiv being a confidant to him. However, a few days before the elections in March 2006, Symonenko was "brutally beaten", and was taken to the intensive care unit of the Yevpatoria City Hospital, but died a few days later. Symonenko's death was found in investigations to have been ordered by his rivals in the elections, namely Alla Bondarenko, with eight people being convicted in his murder. Paraskiv said he was then persuaded to run in the repeat elections in May, where he was pitted against three other opponents, all local entrepreneurs. He was elected with 85% of the vote.

After becoming mayor, Paraskiv described the village as "abandoned," with roofs leaking and hardly any water supply or heat, and said that many wanted it to be transferred and annexed into nearby Yevpatoria. During his time in office, he helped develop the "Terminal Myrnyi", which dealt with water transport, and was headed by Yuriy Zherebtsov, a future counselor to the Chairman of the Verkhovna Rada. In the fall of 2011, a new Orthodox church was erected in the village, which he funded with his wife, as his wife owns enterprises. Towards the end of his term, in August 2012, it was proposed that the National Academy of Sciences would organise an Institute for the Development of Crimea in Myrnyi, with further plans to attract long-term investment in western Crimea. This was personally confirmed by Sergey Glazyev, the then advisor to the President of Russia. He said this would help with tourism from Russia and help with the mass exodus of people from Myrnyi.

=== 2012-2014: Verkhovna Rada ===
In 2012, Paraskiv announced his candidacy for the upcoming 2012 Ukrainian parliamentary elections with the Party of Regions in constituency No. 4. At the time of its formation in 2012, the constituency consisted of the cities of Yevpatoria and Saky, alongside parts of the Saky municipality. According to some sources, Paraskiv was specifically nominated by the Party of Regions, although he was unknown at the time for two reasons. The first was that the Party of Regions had nobody who would run in the district, as their preferred candidate, Oleksandr Zats, wanted to run on the party list due to fears, and they did not want longtime Yevpatoria mayor Andriy Danylenko to run either. Second, he was supported by former employees of the Security Service of Ukraine (SBU), who had dachas near Myryni, who said they would do what was needed to elect him. In the end, he was elected with 34% (27,990 people) of the vote due to a relatively low turnout of 49.3%. His closest opponent was the self-nominated candidate Mykola Kotlyarevsky, who got 27.6% of the vote (22,856 people). Upon joining the Rada, Paraskiv joined the Party of Regions faction and was appointed Deputy Chairman of the Committee on State Building and Local Self-Government.

=== Russian annexation of Crimea ===
Shortly after the 2014 Russian annexation of Crimea, Paraskiv initially said he would not give up his mandate in the Verkhovna Rada, and called the referendum on the annexation something people wanted and that Russia had the right to such actions in Crimea. In an interview, he also said that he believed the roots of the problem started in 2006 when he said Viktor Yushchenko began "rhetoric" about opposition to Russia. In June, he left the Party of Regions faction, and then in the following month joined the pro-Russian "For Peace and Stability" faction. In September, prior to the end of his mandate, he said he was renouncing his mandate in parliament due to the first elections in Crimea and his being a Russian citizen.

== Personal life ==
He is married and has a daughter and a son. His wife, Lada, was his former classmate and is also an entrepreneur and politician with the Party of Regions, having served as a deputy on the Yevpatoria City Council. As of 2012, his daughter is a student at the Sevastopol branch of the Moscow State University, while his son was studying at a secondary school in Myrnyi.
