= Svitlana Fabrykant =

Ukrainian politician (born 1967)

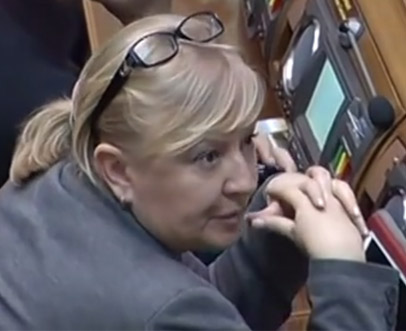
- Born: June 16, 1967 (age 58)
- Occupation: Politician

Svitlana Samuyilivna Fabrykant (born June 16, 1967, Odesa) is a former Member of the Ukrainian Parliament and ex-Deputy Head of the Odesa Regional State Administration.

== Early life and education ==
In 1984, Fabyikant enrolled at Mechnikov Odesa State University but did not complete her studies, making her the only Member of Parliament of the 7th convocation from the Party of Regions without a higher education degree. In her biography submitted to the Central Election Commission during elections, she indicated that she had only a general secondary education.

== Career ==
=== In media ===
From 1998 to 2009, Fabrykant served as the Editor-in-Chief of the Odesa-based television company Riak-Inform. In 2009, she was appointed General Director of the TV channel My Odesa. Throughout her career in journalism, she has received several national and international awards, including those from television festivals such as Golden Era, Golden Wave, Ukraine United, and Radonezh.

=== In politics ===
In 2009, Fabrykant became the head of the Odesa regional branch of the "Strong Ukraine" party. She ran as a candidate for Mayor of Odesa in 2010. In the 2012 Ukrainian parliamentary elections, she was elected as a Member of Parliament representing the "Party of Regions". During her tenure, she served as the Head of the Subcommittee on Labor Relations and Employment Regulation within the Verkhovna Rada Committee on Social Policy and Labor. From 2021 to 2022, she held the position of First Deputy Head of the Odesa Regional State Administration.
