= Valentyna Liutikova =

Russian-Ukrainian politician (born 1953)

- Валентина Лютікова
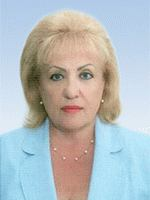
- A photo of her from 2012.

People's Deputy of Ukraine
- In office 12 December 2012 – 27 November 2014
- Constituency: Autonomous Republic of Crimea, No. 5

Personal details
- Born: Valentyna Ivanovna Liutikova; 4 October 1953 (age 73) Kerch, Russian SFSR, Soviet Union
- Party: Party of Regions (2012-2014); Patriots of Russia
- Education: Sevastopol Instrument-Making Institute; Ukrainian State University of Chemical Technology; Kherson National Technical University

Valentyna Ivanovna Liutikova (Ukrainian: Валентина Іванівна Лютікова; Russian: Валентина Ивановна Лютикова; born 4 October 1953) is a Russian and formerly Ukrainian politician who served as a People's Deputy of Ukraine in the Verkhovna Rada representing the 7th convocation from 2012 to its premature end in 2014 with the Party of Regions. Prior to this, she was a longtime politician in Crimea, specifically within the city of Kerch. During the 2014 Russian annexation of Crimea, she sided with Russia.

== Early life ==
Liutikova was born on 4 October 1953 in the city of Kerch, which was then part of the Russian SFSR in the Soviet Union. A few months after her birth, Crimea, and thus Kerch, was transferred to the Ukrainian SSR. After graduating from both the Kerch branch of the Sevastopol Instrument-Making Institute and the Ukrainian State University of Chemical Technology, in 1971, she entered the workforce. She first worked as a controller at VTC and later as a standardisation engineer at the Kerch Metallurgical Plant. After more than a decade at the plant, she was appointed secretary of the Trade Union of Workers of the Metallurgical Industry for Crimea. Liutikova only held the post for three years, though, as she was appointed Chairman of the People's Control Group at the Kerch Metallurgical Plant and later Head of the Apartment Bureau in 1989, a position she retained until 1995. After 1995, she entered executive work, becoming chief specialist of the subsidy department and later head of the organisation and control department of the Kerch City Council. Sometime later she also graduated from the Kherson National Technical University. From 2002 to 2006 she also headed the Kerch Employment Centre.

== Political career ==
=== 1990-2012: Early career in Crimea ===
In 1990, Liutikova first entered politics when she was elected a deputy to the Verkhovna Rada of Crimea. In 2006, she was appointed secretary of the Kerch City Council.

=== 2012-2014: Verkhovna Rada ===
In 2012, she decided to enter national politics, running in the 2012 Ukrainian parliamentary elections with the Party of Regions in constituency No. 5. At the time of its formation in 2012, the constituency consisted mainly of the city of Kerch alongside parts of the Lenine Raion. In the end, she was elected with 41.81% of the vote (27,551) people against the Communist Party of Ukraine candidate Ivan Zheltenko, who got 19.74% (13,011 people), and the Batkivshchyna candidate Illia Sahaidak, who got 14.52% (9,556 people). Upon joining the Rada, she joined the Party of Regions faction and was appointed Chairman of the Subcommittee on Salaries, Indexation, and compensation monetary incomes within the Committee on Issues of Social Policy and Labour. She was also included on the temporary commission for a draft law on languages in March 2014.

=== Russian annexation of Crimea ===
After the 2014 Russian annexation of Crimea, she had co-founded the Crimea branch of the Patriots of Russia with fellow former Crimean MP Vitalina Dzoz in May 2014. In June, Liutikova left the Party of Regions faction in the Verkhovna Rada and joined the pro-Russian "For Peace and Stability" faction. In that same month, in an interview with the Ukrainian newspaper Glavkom, she talked about the annexation and her views. She said that the Crimeans were happy that Russia annexed them and that everything was stable, and that she would not remain with the parliament, but refuted most questions. Liutikova voluntarily renounced her mandate in the Verkhovna Rada in September due to the new elections in Crimea and her becoming a Russian citizen.

== Personal life ==
She is married and has a daughter.

== Honours and awards ==
Liutikova has been awarded the following honours and awards:

- Gratitude of the Chairman of the Council of Ministers of the Autonomous Republic of Crimea (2011)
- Order of Merit, III degree (2013)
