= Yuriy Vozniuk =

Ukrainian politician (born 1980)

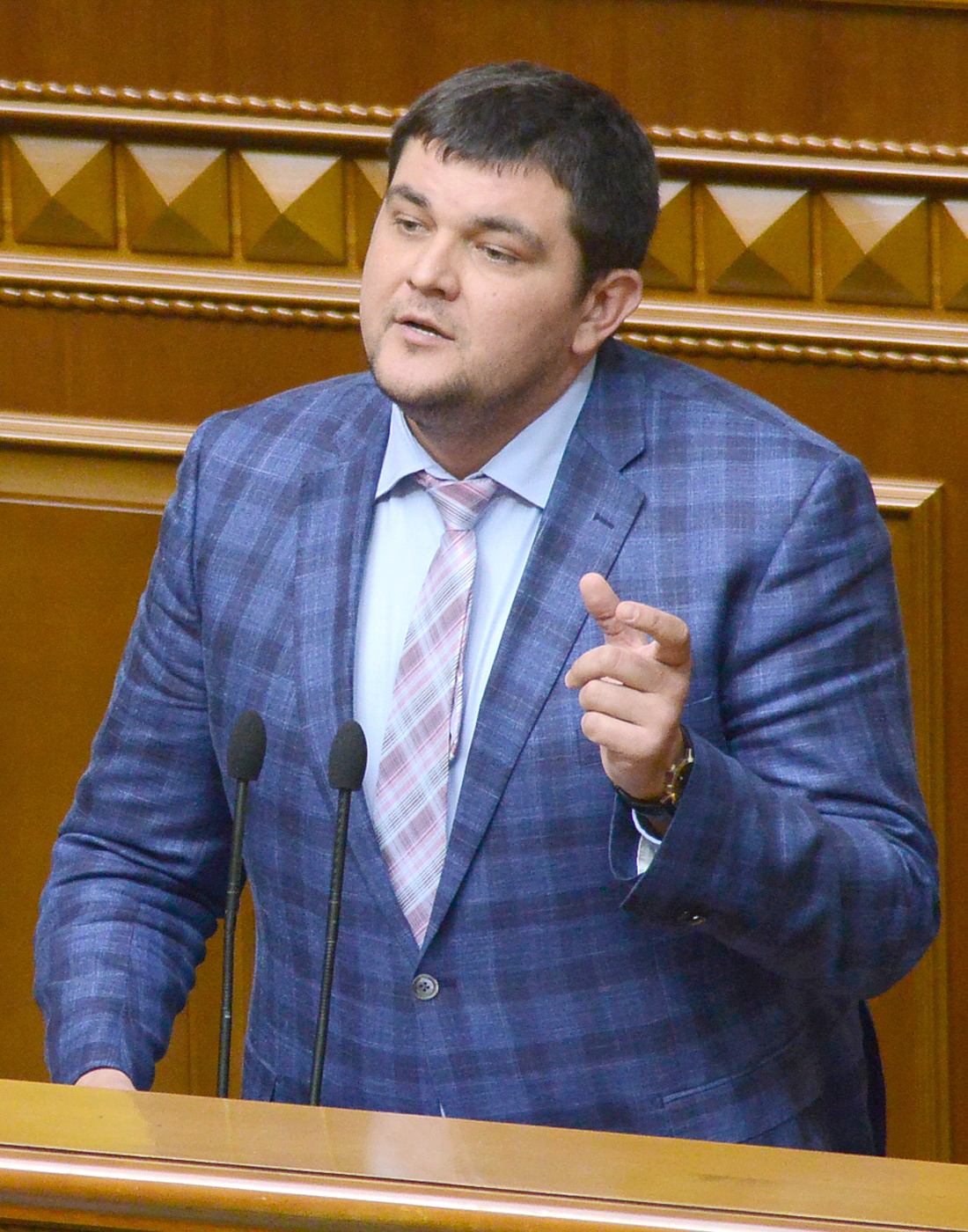
Yuriy Vozniuk

Yuriy Volodymyrovych Vozniuk (born January 31, 1980, Lutsk, Volyn region) is a Ukrainian politician, member of the Parliament of Ukraine of the VII and VIII convocations, participant of anticorruption investigations.

== Biography ==
In 1983, he moved with his parents to Rivne.

From 1986 to 1997, he studied at Rivne School No. 1. He was engaged in athletics (hammer throw), candidate for master of sports.

In 1997, he entered the Demianchuk International University of Economics and Humanities. In 2002, he graduated with a degree in finance.

While studying at the university, he started working at Ekorembud LLC as an accountant-economist. At this company, he worked as a financial director. The company is engaged in construction and installation work at industrial facilities. He works both in Ukraine and abroad.

He continues to study - he is working on his dissertation "Financing of Investment Activities of Oil and Gas Industry Enterprises", a postgraduate student at the Kyiv National Economic University named after Vadym Hetman.

== Political activity ==
As a result of the elections on October 31, 2010, he was elected to the Rivne City Council in a multi-mandate constituency on the list of the Front of Changes political party. He headed the commission on economy, entrepreneurship and investment attraction, and was the head of the Front of Changes faction in the Rivne City Council.

In the 2012 parliamentary elections, he ran in the single-mandate constituency No. 153 (Rivne, Hoshcha, Korets, Ostroh districts, the city of Ostroh and part of Rivne) from the United Opposition "Batkivshchyna". According to the results of the vote, he won with 48.32% of the vote."

Chairman of the Subcommittee on Taxation of Income of Legal Entities, Unification of Tax and Accounting of the Verkhovna Rada Committee on Taxation and Customs Policy.

In the early parliamentary elections of 2014, Yuriy Voznyuk won for the second time with a result of 35.66%, which is 35,935 votes in favor. He was elected as a Member of Parliament of the VIII convocation. He continues to work in the Taxation and Customs Policy Committee and is the Deputy Chairman of this committee.

He was one of 59 MPs who signed a petition on the basis of which the Constitutional Court of Ukraine abolished the article of the Criminal Code of Ukraine on illicit enrichment, which obliged public officials to provide explanations about the sources of their income and the income of their family members. Criminal liability for illicit enrichment was introduced in Ukraine in 2015. This was one of the EU's requirements for the implementation of the Visa Liberalization Action Plan, as well as one of Ukraine's commitments to the IMF, as set out in the memorandum.
