= Halyna Chorna =

Ukrainian journalist and politician (born 1967)

- Галина Чорна
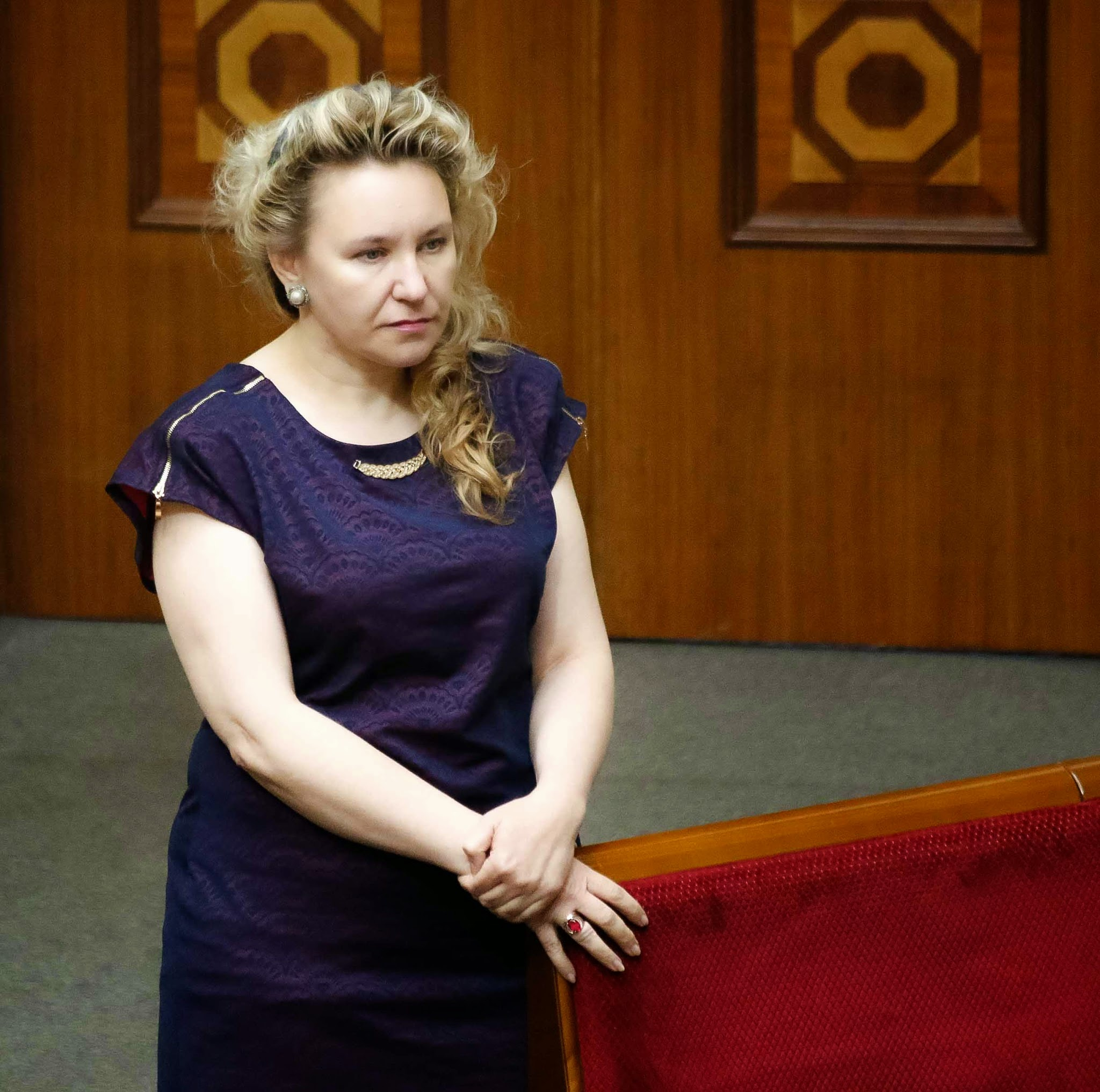

People's Deputy of Ukraine
- In office 9 April 2014 – 27 November 2014
- Constituency: Svoboda, No. 30

Personal details
- Born: Halyna Mykhailivna Myts; 18 November 1967 (age 58) Bilyi Kamin, Ukrainian SSR, Soviet Union (now Ukraine)
- Party: Svoboda
- Education: University of Lviv

Halyna Mykhailivna Chorna (Ukrainian: Галина Михайлівна Чорна; born 18 November 1967), née Myts (Ukrainian: Миць) is a Ukrainian politician and journalist who briefly served as a People's Deputy of Ukraine from the proportional list of the Svoboda party in 2014.

== Early life and education ==
During her school years, Halyna Chorna studied at a music school and an art studio. In 1984, she graduated from secondary school No. 2 with a golden medal in Zolochiv, Lviv Oblast. In 1990, Chorna graduated from the Faculty of Journalism of University of Lviv.

== Career ==
From 1992 to 2002, Chorna worked in the Western Ukrainian socio-political newspaper Moloda Halychyna. She was a correspondent and later the head of the socio-economic problems department. From 2002 to 2008, she worked in the magazine Vysoky Zamok (High Castle). Her articles were published not only in these magazines but also in several Ukrainian and foreign media.

In February 2006, Chorna was appointed editor-in-chief of the magazine of the Svoboda party. The next year, she joined the Svoboda Board of Directors. In October 2010, Chorna was elected the Lviv Oblast Council from Svoboda. In 2012, she became deputy director of the company STO-VP Plus.

In October 2012, she was elected as a People's Deputy of Ukraine from Svoboda's proportional list.

In 2014, Chorna left the post of deputy director of STO-VP Plus and, on 9 April of the same year, took the oath of the People's Deputy of Ukraine. She was the deputy head of the Committee of the Verkhovna Rada of Ukraine on issues of freedom of speech and information in the apparatus of the Verkhovna Rada of Ukraine.

Her deputy powers were terminated on 27 November 2014.

== Personal life ==
Halyna Chorna has a husband - Chorny Arkadii Dmytrovych and a son Andrii. The family resides in Lviv, Ukraine.
