= Vladimir Maltsev =

Ukrainian politician

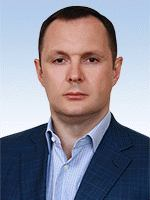
Мальцев Володимир Олександрович

Vladimir Maltsev (born 20 April 1974, Makeyevka, Donetsk region) is the People's Deputy of Ukraine, member of the Party of Regions (since November 2007), a member of the Committee on Justice (December 2007).

== Biography ==
=== Education ===
- 2006 - graduated from Donetsk State Academy of management, qualified in Management of foreign economic activity
- 2008 - qualified as a Master of Management of External Economic Activity
- 2009 - graduated from Odesa National Law Academy qualified in jurisprudence, with a Master's degree of law

=== Career ===
- 1992 - junior stope miner at Zhovtneva mine, Makeevugol community
- 1993 - stope miner at Ordzhonikidze mine
- 1993-1999 - worked at various enterprises ("NEC", PF "Codon", JSC "Alexandra", CJSC "Autoservis")
- 1999 - сar mechanic at JSC "Koksokhimoborudovanie"
- 2004-2005 - employee at LLC "Embrol Ukraine LTD", JSC "Lux"
- December 2005 to May 2006 - Assistant to the General Director, JSC "Lux"

=== Politics ===
Member of the Party of Regions.

- May 2006 - November 2007 - People's Deputy of Ukraine of V convocation, member of the Verkhovna Rada Committee on Social Policy and Labour
- November 2007 - December 2012 - People's Deputy of Ukraine of VI convocation, member of the Committee on Justice
- from December 2012 - November 2014 - People's Deputy of Ukraine of VII convocation, member of the Committee on the law and justice

Maltsev did not participate in the 2014 Ukrainian parliamentary election.
