= Anatoliy Vitiv =

Ukrainian politician

- Анатолій Вітів
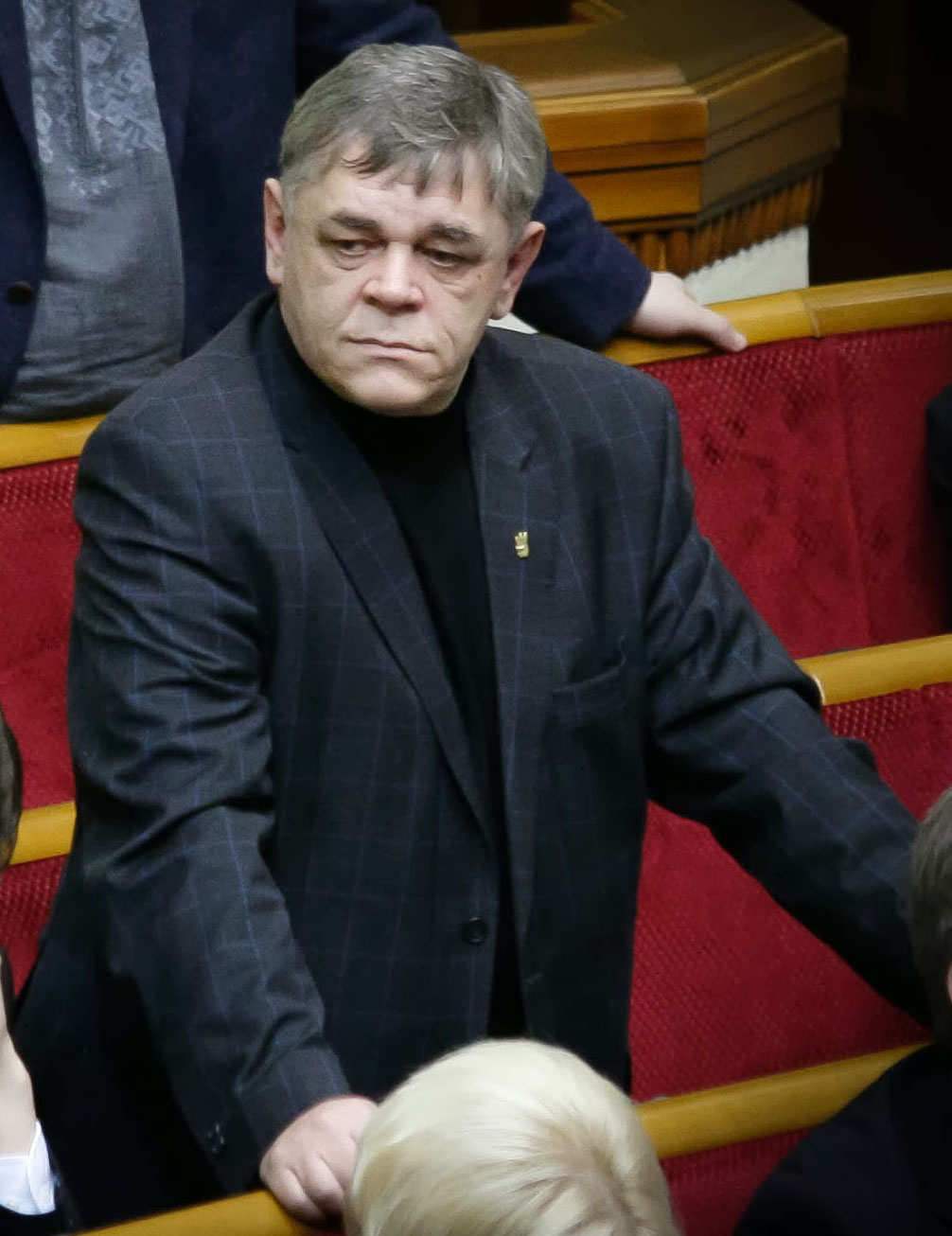
- Anatoliy Vitiv in 2014

People's Deputy of Ukraine

7th convocation
- In office December 12, 2012 – November 27, 2014
- Constituency: All-Ukrainian Union "Svoboda"

Personal details
- Born: Anatoliy Mykolayovych Vitiv; 22 July 1960 Oporets, Lviv Oblast, Soviet Union (now Ukraine)
- Party: All-Ukrainian Union "Svoboda"

Anatoliy Mykolayovych Vitiv (Ukrainian: Анатолій Миколайович Вітів; 22 July 1960) is a Ukrainian politician, people's deputy of Ukraine, and a member of "Svoboda" (All-Ukrainian Union "Svoboda").

In 2012–2014 he was a people's deputy of Ukraine as a member of Svoboda. He was the head of the Volyn Regional Organization "Svoboda".

He is a member of the Verkhovna Rada Committee on Transport and Communications.

== Early life and education ==
He was born on 22 July 1960 in the village of Oporets, which was then part of the Ukrainian SSR in the Soviet Union. From September 1975 to July 1978 he studied at the Vocational School No. 8 in Stryi. Secondary technical education.

After graduating, he worked in a variety of laborer jobs. He first worked as a locksmith for the Dnipropetrovsk Switch Plant, before completing his mandatory military service in the Soviet Armed Forces in Yelan. He then returned to Ukraine to work as a locksmith at ATP 39601, which he continued to do after the collapse of the Soviet Union until 1995. After a brief retirement, from 2005 to 2006 he worked as commercial director of TOV VKF "ASTAV". He was later commercials director of PP "Lotos Plus" and sales manager of TOV "Volodymyr Ekobud" in addition.

== Political activity ==
He was Chairman of the Volyn regional organization VO "Svoboda".

In October 2010, he was elected a deputy of the Volyn Regional Council in the single-mandate majority constituency No. 37 (Lutsk). He was a deputy of the Volyn Regional Council from 2010 to 2012 and from 2015 to 2019. He was the leader of the Svoboda faction, a member of the Standing Committee on Parliamentary Activities, Local Self-Government, Protection of Human Rights, Legality, and Fight against Crime.

In the 2012 parliamentary elections, he was elected as a people's deputy of Ukraine on the list of the All-Ukrainian Union "Freedom", No. 6 on the electoral list.

Member of the Verkhovna Rada Committee on Transport and Communications.

== Personal life ==
He is married and has a daughter.
