= Nikolai Levchenko =

Ukrainian politician (born 1979)

Mykola Levchenko
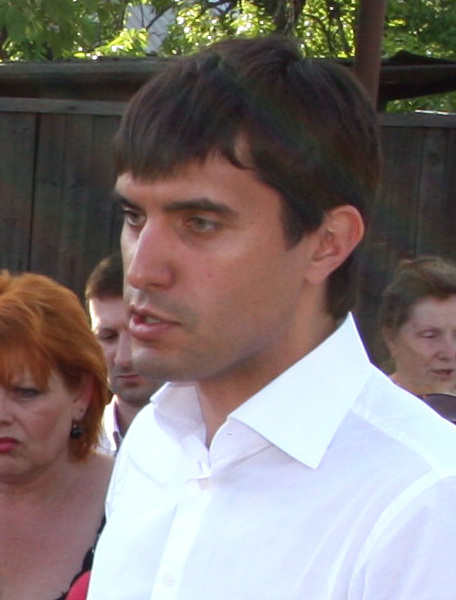
- Levchenko in 2012.
- Born: Mykola Olkesandrovych Levchenko; October 16, 1979 (age 47); Donetsk, Ukrainian SSR
- Education: Donetsk National University, Donetsk Institute of Internal Affairs, Candidate of Historical Sciences
- Occupations: People’s Deputy Ukraine of the 7th convocation, the Head of the international fund "Donbas without weapons"

Mykola Olkesandrovych Levchenko (born October 16, 1979, Donetsk) is the Ukrainian politician, People's Deputy of Ukraine of the 7th convocation, Candidate of Historical Sciences. He is well known for his statements against conducting of the anti-terrorist operation and for settling the conflict in Donbas peacefully. Since 2016 he is the Head of the international fund "Donbas without weapons".

== Biography ==
=== Early years ===
Nikolai Levchenko was born on October 16, 1979, in the city of Donetsk. In 1996, he enrolled at Donetsk National University, the faculty of History, and graduated from it in 2001 with “international relations” degree. In 2000 to receive a second degree entered the Donetsk Institute of Internal Affairs, faculty of law, and graduated from it in 2003. The same year successfully defended the candidate dissertation in history. After graduating from the faculty of History of Donetsk National University in 2001 worked as a history teacher in high school #72 in Donetsk.

=== State activity ===
- In 1998, Levchenko was elected a deputy of the Kuibyshev District Council in Donetsk.
- In October 2001, he was elected as the First Vice-chairman of the Donetsk Regional Organization “Regions Youth Union”.
- In March 2001, was elected a deputy of the Donetsk City Council.
- Since February 2003, has worked in Donetsk City Council as the Head of Public Relations Office.
- From 2004 to 2010, was elected the Secretary of the Donetsk City Council of the 4th, 5th, 6th convocations.
- In 2008, he was elected the vice-chairman of the Donetsk Regional Organization the Party of Regions.
- From 2012 to 2014 was People's Deputy of Ukraine of the 7th convocation. The Chairman of the parliamentary subcommittee on amendments to the Constitution of Ukraine and the Constitution of the Autonomous Republic of Crimea, constitutional legislation.
- In 2014, he was Chairman of the Donetsk Regional Organization the Party of Regions. As a People's Deputy of Ukraine has submit to the Parliament a set of bills aimed at decentralization of authority and at extension of powers of local government bodies.

After the start of the War in the Donbas, he attempted to, alongside oligarch Rinat Akhmetov, negotiate with the militants of the pro-Russian, separatist Donetsk People's Republic after they had seized the Donetsk Oblast State Administration building the day prior. After this failed, he sided with the Russians and moved to Moscow. Since then, he has been a frequent political pundit on television channels in Moscow.

=== Family status ===
He is married with five children.

== Well-known statements ==
Before the escalation of the conflict in Donbas has initiated the Congress of deputies of all levels “Donbas without weapons” where has insisted on peaceful resolutions to all the issues.

"Those calling for Donbas to withdraw from Ukraine I’d like to answer that it’s like to throw yourself from the 10th floor if you are not satisfy with the HMO’s services. Jump out of the window is the simplest and the swiftest way to solve the problem. But what awaits us at the end of this falling? If we are not satisfied with the rules of life in this house we should stay in the house entitled Ukraine and force to restore order that is acceptable to all citizens, to all residents of Donetsk region".

On 22 July 2014 following the vote on the presidential decree on partial mobilization made a statement: “Today we understood that authority will continue to kill Ukrainians”. In response to this Levchenko switched off the microphone. Parliamentary speaker Oleksandr Turchynov urged “the fifth column that serves Putin” to stop provocations. Thereafter a fight ensued and the issue about removal Levchenko from the conference room was set out.

In 2018, he proposed in an open letter to Vladimir Putin on his Facebook profile that the areas of the DPR and Luhansk People's Republic (LPR) be placed under international peacekeeping control and then subsequently gradually be reintegrated into Ukraine. In the statement, he said that supporting the DPR and LPR worsened the situation of the Donbas and caused mass migration, while also alienating Ukrainian relations with Russia. Levchenko also denied Russian statements about the genocide of Russians in the Donbas, pointing to cities that were later liberated by Ukraine, like Mariupol, Sloviansk, and Kramatorsk, not displaying cleansing effects.
