= Oleksandr Shevchenko (politician, born 1937) =

Ukrainian scientist and politician

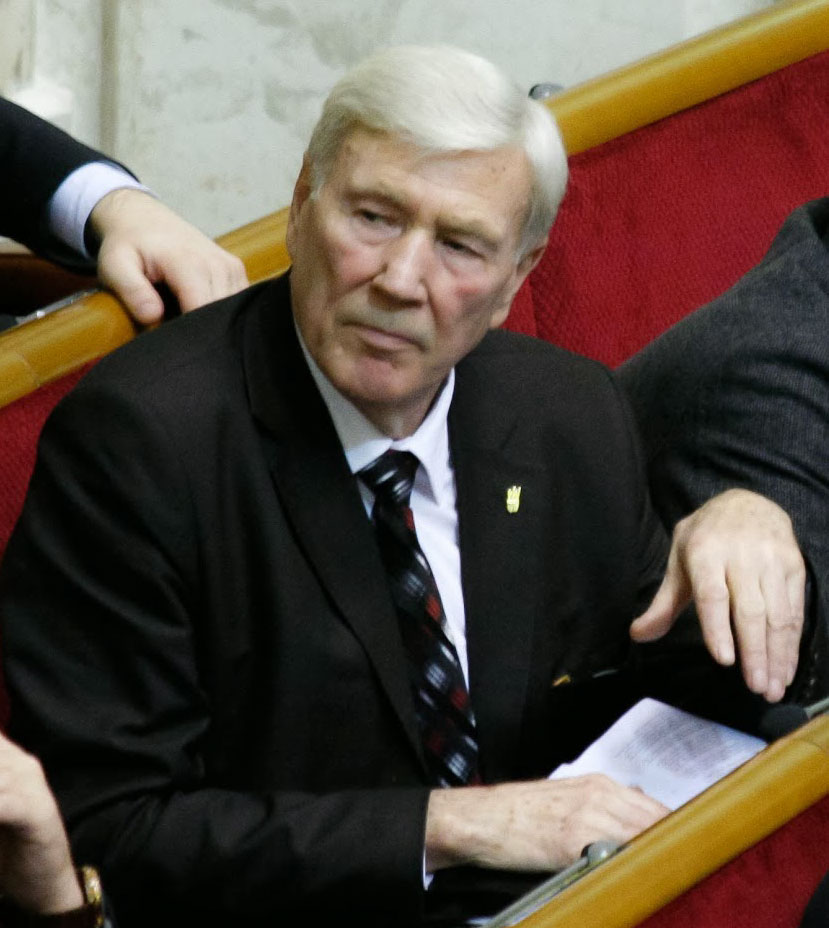
2014

Oleksandr Oksentiyovych Shevchenko (Ukrainian: Олександр Оксеньтійович Шевченко; 26 June 1937 – 15 January 2016) was a Ukrainian scientist, jurist, politician, and doctor of legal sciences.

Shevchenko was born on June 26, 1937, in sovkhoz Partizany, Simferopol Raion, Russian SFSR. He graduated from the historic-philosophy faculty of Kiev University in 1965. Shevchenko obtained his doctorate in 1995. After graduation, he worked at Dnipropetrovsk National University and as an English language interpreter during construction of a metallurgy plant in Egypt. Since 1971 Shevchenko has worked at Kiev University.

In the October 2014 parliamentary election Shevchenko was 31st on the election list of his party; since the party came 0.29% short to overcome the 5% threshold to win seats on the nationwide list he was not elected into parliament.
