= Roman Zabzaliuk =

Ukrainian politician

- Роман Забзалюк
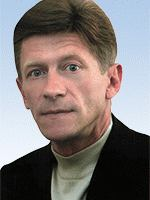
- Official portrait, 2012

Member of the Verkhovna Rada
- In office 23 November 2007 – 27 November 2014
- In office 25 May 2006 – 12 June 2007

Personal details
- Born: 18 July 1960 Lviv, Ukraine, Soviet Union
- Died: 9 October 2018 (aged 58)
- Party: Batkivshchyna

Roman Omelianovych Zabzaliuk (Ukrainian: Роман Омелянович Забзалюк; 18 July 1960 – 9 October 2018) was a Ukrainian politician who served as a People's Deputy of Ukraine from 2006 to 2014.

== Early life ==
Zabzaliuk was born on 18 July 1960 in the city of Lviv, which was then part of the Ukrainian SSR in the Soviet Union. After graduating from the Hetman Petro Sahaidachnyi National Ground Forces Academy in 1981, he entered the Soviet Armed Forces, and during this time he served in the Afghan War, for which he was awarded a Order of the Red Star, and was a Master of Sports in rifle shooting. After the collapse of the Soviet Union, he joined the Ukrainian Armed Forces and continued serving until 1994, and by the time he was left was a reserve lieutenant colonel.

In 1995, after retiring from the army, he founded the "Southern Bug Cossack Palanka" organization in Mykolaiv, and then in 1999 because head of the Mykolaiv regional Batkivshchyna party.

== Political career ==
During the 2006 Ukrainian parliamentary election, he was elected to the Verkhovna Rada from the Bloc of Yulia Tymoshenko. He resigned his mandate on 12 June 2007 during the political crisis at the time, and then ran again in the snap 2007 Ukrainian parliamentary election, and was re-elected. On December 23, 2011, Zabzaliuk left the BYT-Batkivshchyna faction, and on January 10, 2012, he joined the Reforms for the Future parliamentary group. However, on February 8, he claimed that his transfer was formal and that he had received $450,000 from Ihor Rybakov for it. He released audio recordings in which voices similar to Zabzaliuk and Rybakov are heard, and he called for a parliamentary investigative commission on bribery to be held. After returning to Batkivshchyna, he was re-elected for a last time in 2012, and he became Deputy Chair of the Committee on National Security and Defense.

During his time as an MP, he was known for his anti-corruption investgations.

== Personal life ==
He died on 9 October 2018 of a serious illness.
