= Funeral of Yuri Gagarin and Vladimir Seryogin =

On 29–30 March 1968 in Moscow

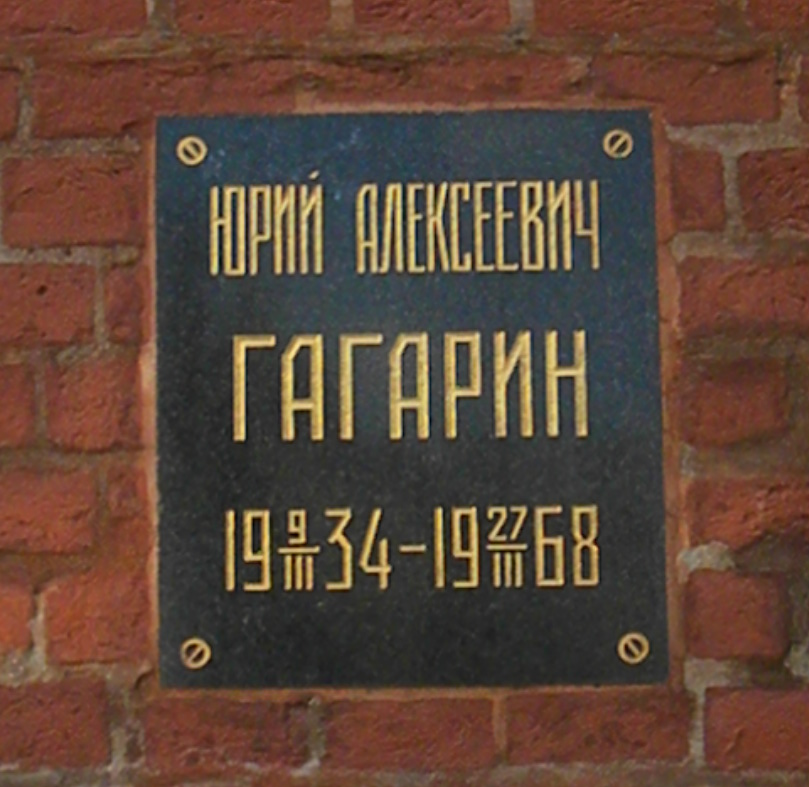
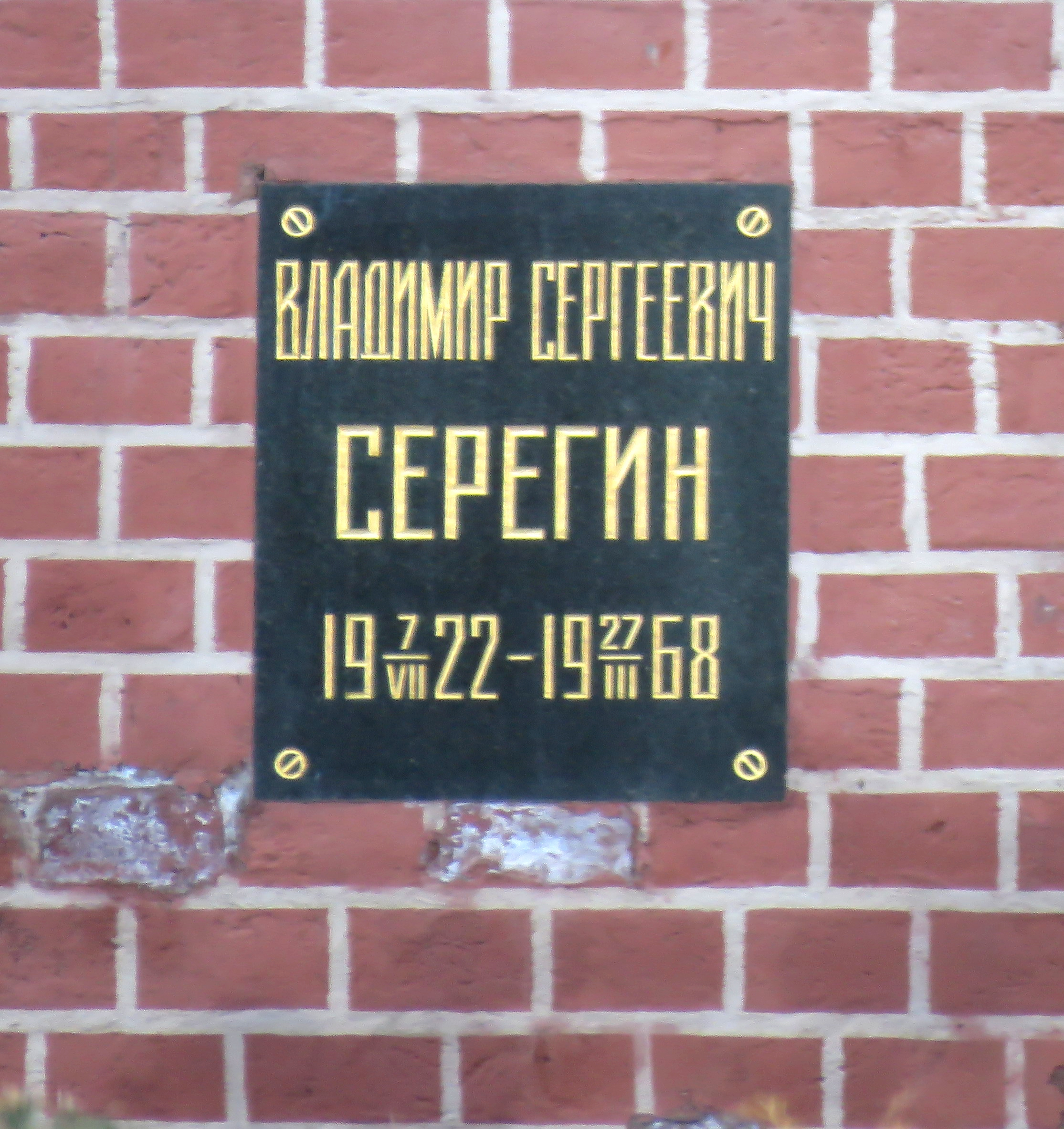
Plaques of Gagarin and Seryogin on the Kremlin Wall Necropolis in Moscow

The funeral of cosmonaut Yuri Gagarin and test-pilot Vladimir Seryogin took place on 29–30 March 1968.

Gagarin, the first human in space, died in a training flight with his instructor Vladimir Seryogin on 27 March 1968. Both had received numerous recognitions, including the Hero of the Soviet Union, during their lifetimes.

A period of national mourning was declared for the first time in Soviet history for a person who was not a national leader or for a person who died while performing work for the state.

The funeral consisted of a joint ceremony, a funeral procession and the burial of their funerary urns in the Kremlin Wall Necropolis in Moscow. Funeral wreaths were sent by all Soviet republics and a number of foreign countries. During the funeral procession, the urns were carried by Soviet leader Leonid Brezhnev and senior Communist Party members – Alexei Kosygin and Nikolai Podgorny.

== Background ==
Gagarin and Seryogin died on 27 March 1968 when their MiG-15UTI aircraft crashed during training exercises in Vladimir Oblast, Russian SFSR.

By the morning of 28 March, the remains of both pilots and their personal belongings were found and identified. On 28 March at 21:15 the remains of Gagarin and Seryogin were cremated.

The official investigation into the crash stated that the aircraft entered a spin after dodging a weather balloon. According to Arseny Mironov, a member of the flight subcommittee that investigated the crash, neither pilot had ejected the aircraft and their bodies became fragmented upon impact.

On 29 March 1968, all Soviet newspapers issued significant coverage of the crash, including obituaries, large portraits of Gagarin and condolences from statesmen.

== Funeral ==
The Central Committee of the Soviet Communist Party and the Council of Ministers set up a government commission to organise the funeral. This commission consisted of Andrei Kirilenko (chairman), Dmitry Polyansky, Dmitry Ustinov, Viktor Grishin, Ivan Yakubovsky, Alexei Yepishev, Konstantin Vershinin, Mstislav Keldysh, Andriyan Nikolayev and Mikhail Smirtyukov.

On the morning of 29 March 1968, access to the funerary urns of Gagarin and Seryogin was opened to the public at the Central House of the Soviet Army (CHSA). On that day, over 40,000 people attended the CHSA.

Due to the large number of people queueing to pay their respects late into the evening of 29 March, the ceremony in the CHSA was extended. Public access to the CHSA was closed at noon on 30 March, with only relatives, friends and officials remaining.

=== Funeral procession ===
On 30 March at 13:10, the funerary urns of Gagarin and Seryogin were moved from the CHSA towards the House of the Unions. The funeral procession proceeded along tens of thousands of people behind cordons along the route. Upon reaching the House of the Unions, the urns were placed on a gun carriage towed by an armored personnel carrier, and the procession continued to Red Square. Military personnel carried the awards of the deceased ahead of the urns, and a guard of honor marched alongside the gun carriage, followed by relatives of the deceased, military leaders, statesmen and astronauts.

The funeral procession was secretly photographed by Gennady Fedorov, who, as a member of the internal and escort guards of the Soviet Ministry of Public Order (later the Ministry of Internal Affairs), participated in the funeral preparations on Red Square. According to Fedorov, one man behind the cordon shouted during the funeral:

– How did they let the first cosmonaut die?!

The KGB officers ran up to him and one of them asked on the run:

– Where do you work?

A verbal exchange then followed between the man and the KGB:

– I'm a baker.
– If you get suspended from your job, would you strive to return?
– Yes!
– So would he. He was a pilot, he needed to fly. It was the engine, the system that failed.
– So find those who were responsible and why it failed!

After that the man was taken away and there were no more disruptions.

=== Burial ===
The funerary procession stopped near the Lenin Mausoleum, where a military band was standing. Near the Mausoleum, the funerary urns were put on special pedestals and the burial ceremony began.

At 14:30, the chairman of the government funeral commission, Andrei Kirilenko, placed the urns in designated niches of the Kremlin Wall Necropolis.

A moment of silence was observed throughout the Soviet Union, followed by a gun salute. The anthem of the Soviet Union was played, then the military marched past the Mausoleum.

== Foreign reactions ==
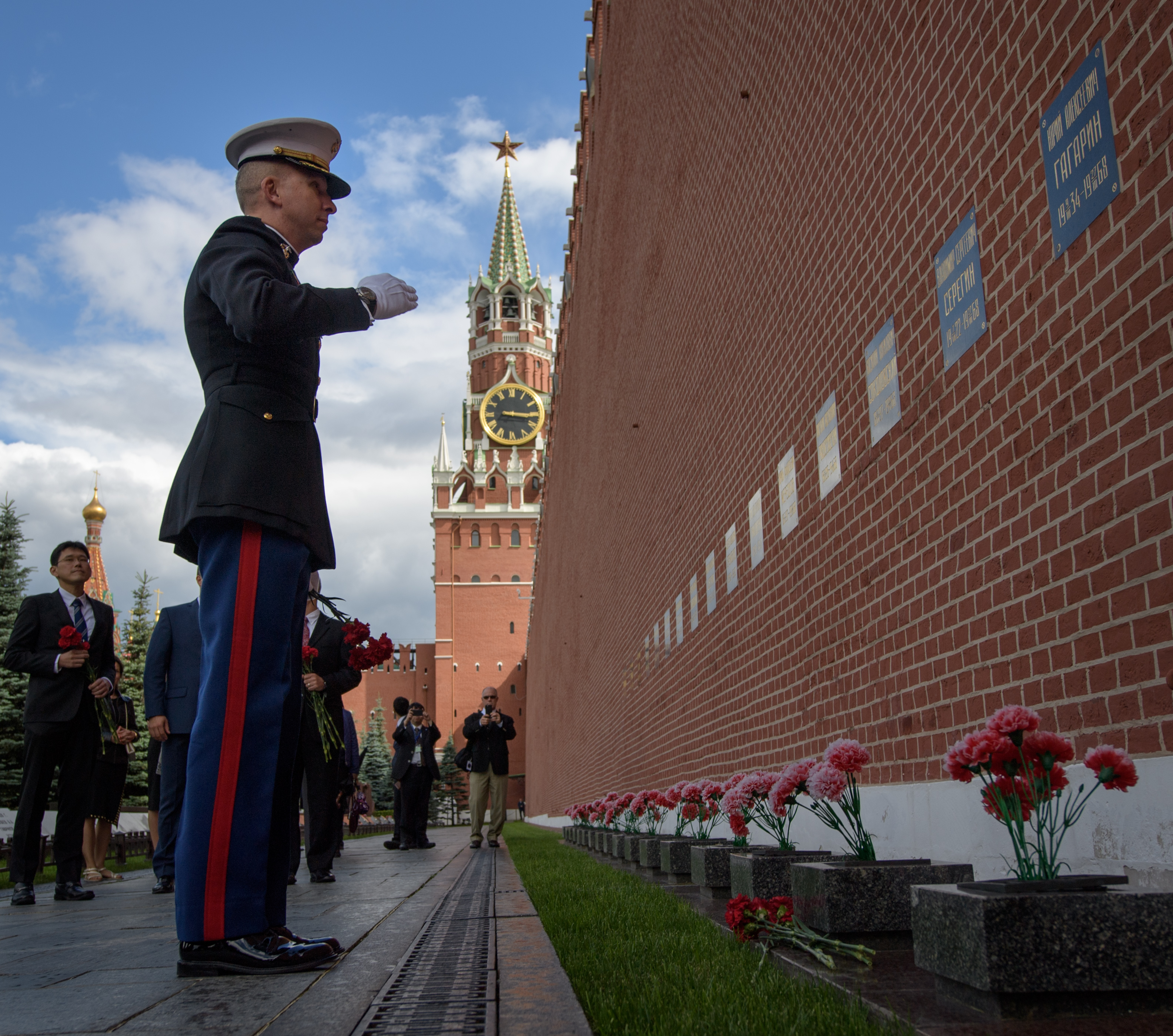
Expedition 52 flight engineer Randy Bresnik saluting at the site of Gagarin's burial, 2017

The funeral was covered in The New York Times and some other foreign publications.

In 1968, Maltese writer and linguist Joseph Aquilina published the English-language poem "On the Funeral of Maj. Yuri Gagarin and Col. Vladimir Seryogin".

== Proposed reburial ==
In 2020, after the death of Gagarin's widow Valentina, a historian of Russian cosmonautics Alexander Glushko proposed l reburying the Gagarin couple "at one of the country’s cemeteries" with the construction of a "splendid monument", and "removing" the Kremlin Wall Necropolis.

Gagarin's friend Valentin Petrov spoke out against the reburial: "The ashes should not be touched. Let it be the way he lays with Seryogin in the Kremlin Wall".

The issue of reburial of prominent figures at the Kremlin Wall has been raised on other occasions.
