= Death of Yuri Gagarin =

1968 jet fighter crash that killed the first man who went to space

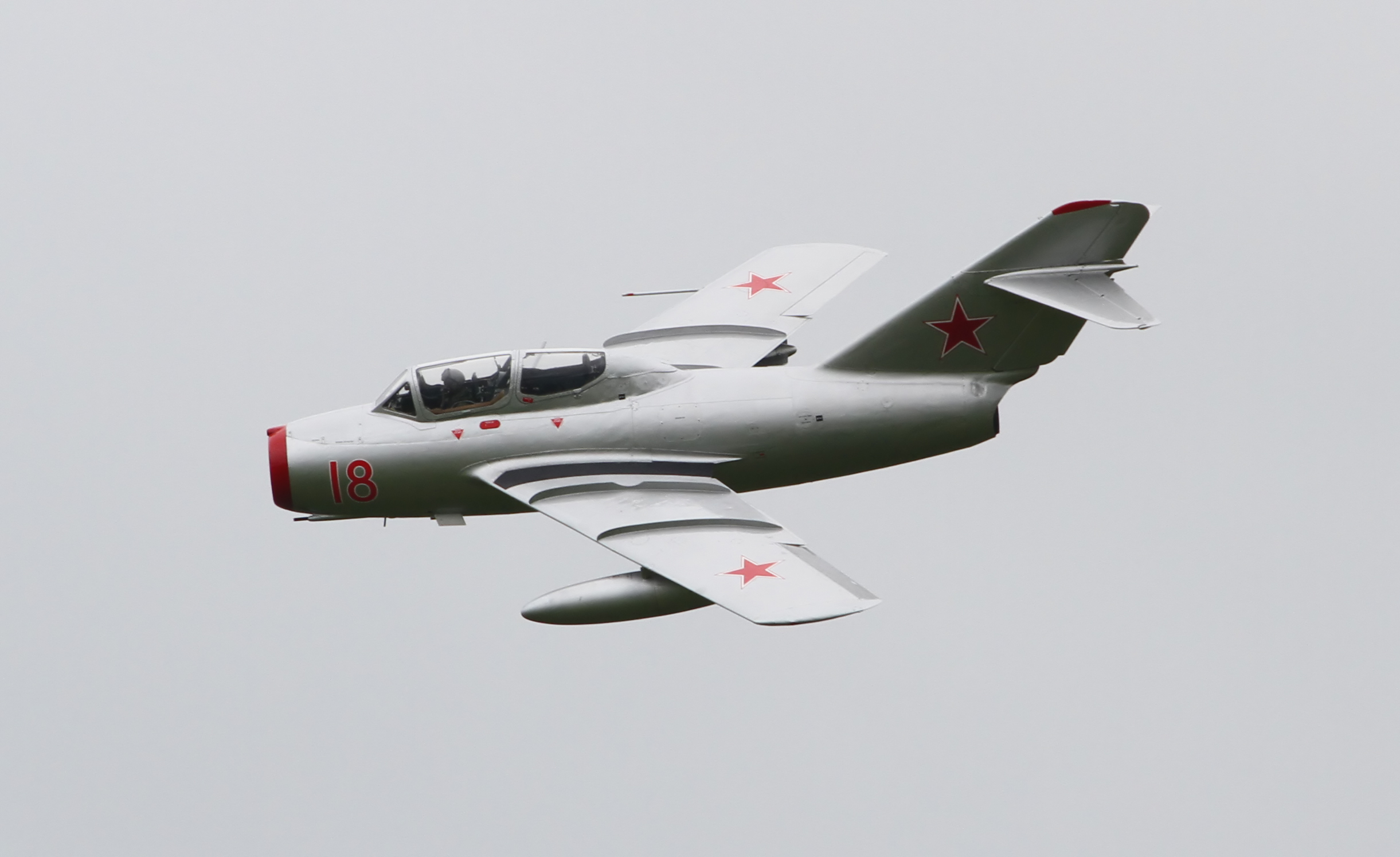
- A MiG-15UTI similar to the one involved in the crash

Accident
- Date: 27 March 1968
- Summary: Crashed following loss of control
- Site: Near Novosyolovo, Soviet Union; 56°2′47.9″N 39°1′35.4″E

Aircraft
- Aircraft type: MiG-15UTI
- Operator: Soviet Air Forces
- Registration: 612739
- Flight origin: Chkalovsky Airport, Moscow Oblast, Soviet Union
- Occupants: 2
- Crew: 2
- Fatalities: 2
- Survivors: 0

On 27 March 1968, Yuri Gagarin, the first human to go into space, died together with pilot Vladimir Seryogin during a routine training flight, after the MiG-15 jet fighter they were flying crashed near Novosyolovo in the Soviet Union.

After his death, the Soviet government declared a period of national mourning in the memory of Gagarin. This was the first case in Soviet history where a day of national mourning was declared after the death of a person while performing work for the state and was the first time it happened for someone who was not a head of state.

At 21:15 of the next day, the remains of Gagarin and Vladimir Seryogin were cremated. Their ashes were buried in the Kremlin Wall Necropolis.

Wrapped in secrecy, the cause of the crash that killed Gagarin is uncertain and became the subject of several theories. At least three investigations into the crash were conducted separately by the Air Force, official government commissions, and the KGB. According to a biography of Gagarin by Jamie Doran and Piers Bizony, Starman: The Truth Behind the Legend of Yuri Gagarin, the KGB worked "not just alongside the Air Force and the official commission members but against them."

== The aircraft ==
The training aircraft MiG-15UTI no. 612739, in which (according to N. Kamanin's diary) the crash happened, was made on 19 March 1956 in Aero Vodochody factory in Czechoslovakia. After its entry into service it was repaired twice (on 13 July 1962, and 30 March 1967). Its engine, RD-45FA no. 84445A, was produced on 25 December 1954 and was repaired four times (1957, 1959, 1964 and 1967) after fulfilling 100 flight hours each time. After the last repair, the engine worked for 66 hours and 51 minutes.

== The crash ==
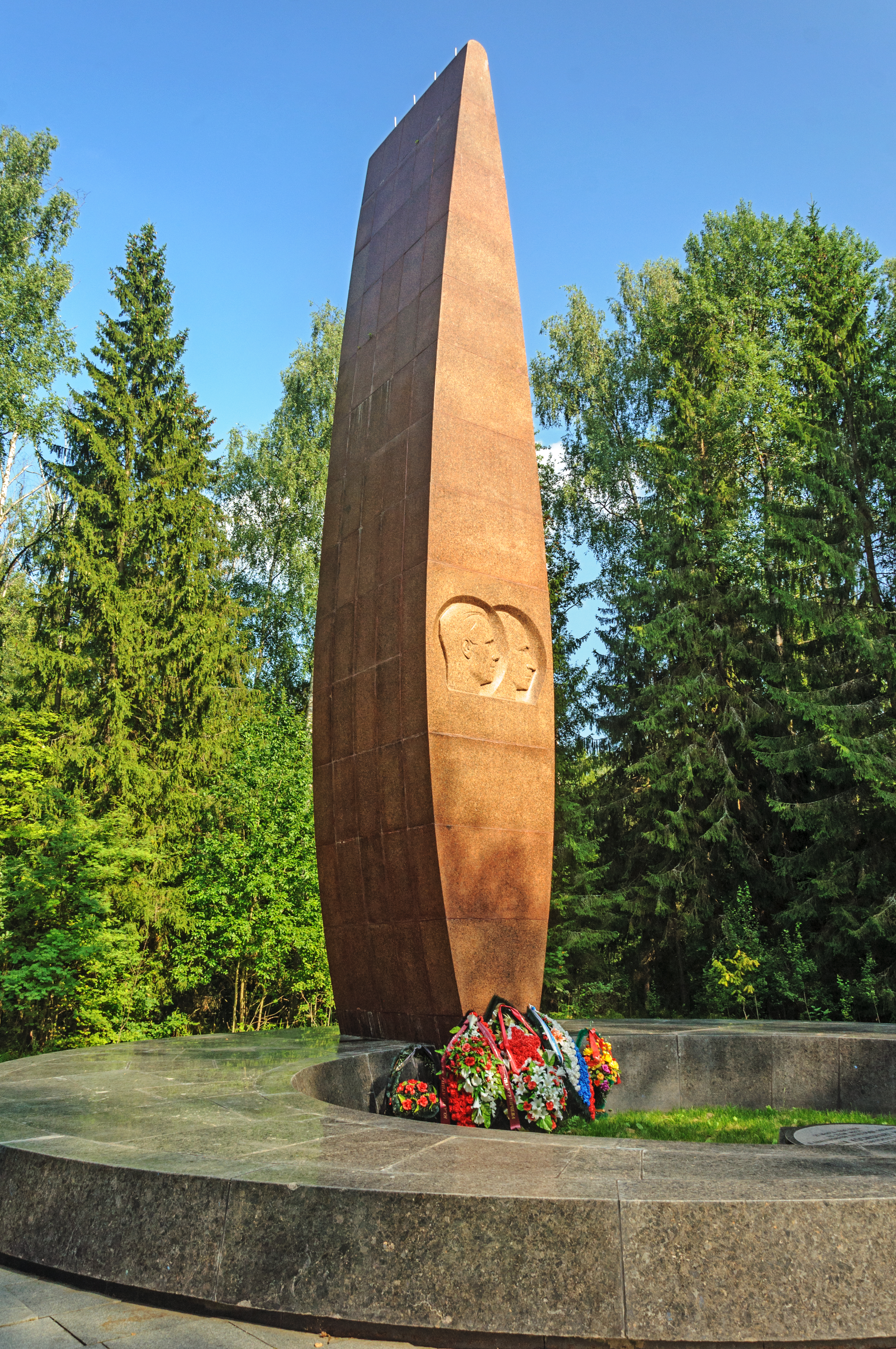
Memorial at the crash site

After posting his thesis in an engineer training academy of the Soviet Air Forces and an extended flight pause, Gagarin began his summer practice, composed of a few training flights with the MiG-15UTI aircraft, which was used for training purposes. Between 13 and 22 March 1968 he performed 18 flights, completing a total of 7 hours. Before being allowed to perform flights independently, he was required to do another two controlled flights alongside the pilot, colonel, and Hero of the Soviet Union Vladimir Seryogin.

At 10:18 on the morning of 27 March 1968, Gagarin and Seryogin took off from Chkalovsky Air Base in Shchyolkovo, a settlement close to Moscow. At take off the visibility conditions on the ground were good, however there was a cloud layer at 600 metres (2,000 ft). The mission was not expected to last more than 20 minutes, but at 10:27, 8 minutes after he started, Gagarin relayed that the mission had been completed. At 10:29 (Moscow time) he asked for, and received, permission to return to base. At 10:30, contact was lost with the aircraft.

A rescue mission was initiated when it became clear that the aircraft was out of fuel, which lasted more than 3 hours. At 14:50 one of the helicopters managed to take an image of the aircraft's wreckage approximately 65 kilometres (40 mi) from the airport, close to Novosyolovo, 18 kilometres (11 mi) away from Kirzhach in Vladimir Oblast. The next morning, government commission members surveyed the debris of the aircraft. Parts of Gagarin and Seryogin's bodies were found, which were recognised by relatives and colleagues. At the site of the crash, various objects were found, such as personal items of the pilots - a pocket edition book with navigation rules and photos of Sergei Korolyov. Gagarin's flight jacket was found in a tree, which contained some food coupons. Due to the way Gagarin's hand bones were broken, the investigators concluded that he had not given up the flight controls during the crash.

== Causes of the crash ==
=== Official explanation given for the crash ===
The government's committee for the investigation of the causes of the crash consisted of three subcommittees. Each of these had been assigned a separate task:

- The flight subcommittee was founded to research the preparation of the flight's equipment, the preparation of its setup, and the assurance of the flights of 27 March.
- The mechanics' subcommittee was set up to research the material parts of the aircraft.
- The medical subcommittee was set up to evaluate the situation of the pilots during the flight, and to identify the dead.

The 29-volume report of the committee was classified and its details became known to the public from interviews of its members. The causes and the conditions during the crash remain unclear.

An analysis of the cabin's clock and Gagarin's hand proved that the disaster happened at 10:31, around a minute after Gagarin's last contact.

The conclusion of the committee was the following: due to the changes in the air environment during the flight (the details were not specified) the crew made an abrupt maneuver resulting in a spin. Despite the crew's efforts to reinstate the engine in a horizontal direction, the aircraft crashed in the ground resulting in the death of the pilots. No deficiencies or technical errors in the plane were found. The chemical analysis of the remains and the pilots' blood did not find any external chemical substance.

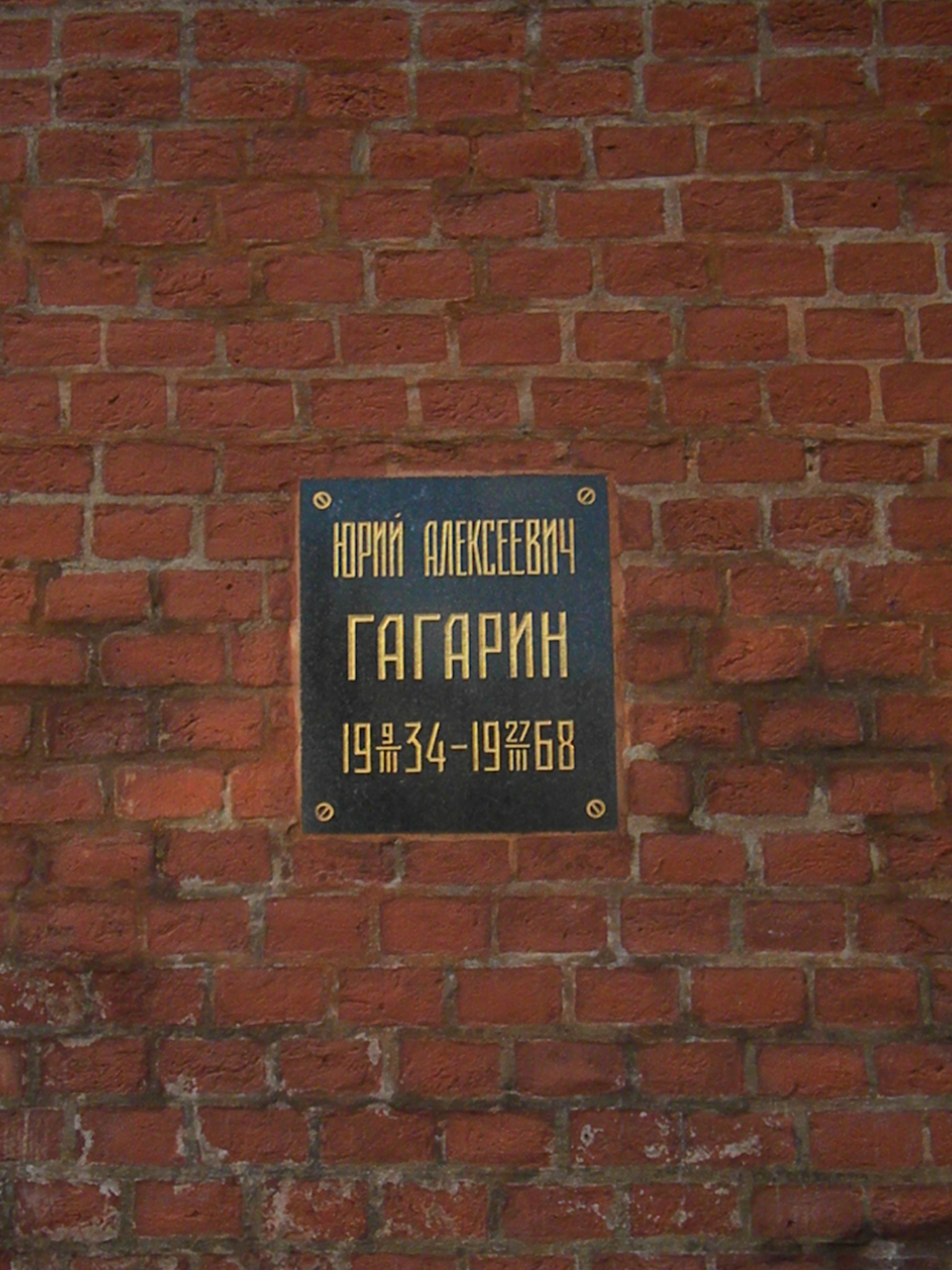
Plaque marking Gagarin's interment in the Kremlin Wall in Moscow

A KGB committee did separate research, in order to prove according to "its own line" if any conspiracy, act of terrorism, or any ill intent existed. The KGB's report, declassified in March 2003, dismissed various conspiracy theories and instead indicated the actions of airbase personnel contributed to the crash. The report states that an air-traffic controller provided Gagarin with outdated weather information and that by the time of his flight, conditions had deteriorated significantly. Ground crew also left external fuel tanks attached to the aircraft. Gagarin's planned flight activities needed clear weather and no outboard tanks. The investigation concluded Gagarin's aircraft entered a spin, either due to a bird strike or because of a sudden move to avoid another aircraft. Because of the out-of-date weather report, the crew believed their altitude was higher than it was and could not react properly to bring the MiG-15 out of its spin. Another theory, advanced in 2005 by the original crash investigator, hypothesises that a cabin air vent was accidentally left open by the crew or the previous pilot, leading to oxygen deprivation and leaving the crew incapable of controlling the aircraft. A similar theory, published in Air & Space magazine, is that the crew detected the open vent and followed procedure by executing a rapid dive to a lower altitude. This dive caused them to lose consciousness and crash.

In the 50th anniversary of Gagarin's flight the government released various classified documents with conclusions for the possible causes of his death. The documents revealed that the commission's original conclusion was that Gagarin or Seryogin had maneuvered sharply, either to avoid a weather balloon or to avoid "entry into the upper limit of the first layer of cloud cover", leading the jet into a "super-critical flight regime and to its stalling in complex meteorological conditions".

As the official version and the factual proof are unclear, various conspiracy theories and speculations have been published for the crash. This crash remains debated. There are various speculations for the crash's causes, such as a version that states Gagarin died during the flight, and another where deep political motives were involved. For comparison, there are some theories that according to them Gagarin's death was ordered by Leonid Brezhnev, because he was supposedly jealous of Gagarin's popularity.

=== Alternative versions ===
Alexei Leonov, who was also a member of a state commission established to investigate Gagarin's death, believes that a Sukhoi Su-15 was flying in the same flight zone below its minimum altitude and, "without realising it because of the terrible weather conditions, [the pilot] passed within 10 or 20 metres of Yuri and Seryogin's plane while breaking the sound barrier". The resulting turbulence would have sent the MiG-15UTI into an uncontrolled spin. In a June 2013 interview with Russian television network RT, Leonov said a report on the incident confirmed the presence of a second aircraft, an "unauthorised" Su-15, flying in the area.

According to the head of the Cosmonaut Training Center from 1963 to 1972, Nikolai Fyodorovich Kuznetsov, Seryogin was not well at that time: he often vomited and complained of heart pains. During the execution of the maneuver, Seryogin again became ill, possibly having had a heart attack. He unbuckled the seat belts and the parachute harness. Gagarin, piloting, did not immediately notice the state of the instructor. Seryogin's body, moving around the cockpit, moved the controls out of neutral, and this blocked some of them. Yuri did not abandon his friend who was in trouble and immediately eject. For almost 10 minutes he made circles over Novosyolovo, trying to restore Seryogin to life while piloting the aircraft, and consequently dying with him.

The version of a former employee of the State Research Institute of Aircraft Maintenance (13 NII VVS), retired Air Force colonel Igor Kuznetsov, is based on the idea that one of the ventilation valves could possibly remain half-open in the MiG-15UTI aircraft. Violation of the tightness of the cabin was found only at an altitude of 3,000 metres (9,800 ft) to 4,000 metres (13,000 ft). To prevent oxygen starvation, the pilots sharply tried to lower the plane to the level recommended by the instructions (2,000 metres (6,600 ft)), but the rapid drop in pressure caused them to lose consciousness. This theory remains disputed, for various reasons:

- it is unlikely that such experienced pilots would panic,
- depressurisation at this altitude is not a special case in flight and does not pose a threat to the crew.

According to the cosmonaut Vladimir Aksyonov, on the day of Gagarin's death, Aksyonov underwent a pre-flight medical examination with him at the airfield but flew in a different plane for zero-gravity training. Aksyonov's version notes that the crew of Gagarin and Seryogin, having made a mistake in difficult weather conditions, did not orient themselves in the situation, which led to the fall and crash. Aksyonov clarifies that the weather conditions on the day of the plane crash were difficult but quite acceptable for performing flight missions. "The cloudiness that day was unusual: the bottom edge of the nearly solid clouds was about 600 metres above the ground. Then, up to a height of 4 thousand metres, the clouds were dense, with small rarefaction. No clouds above the top edge: clear sky and very good visibility. We were even shown photographs of the top edge taken from a meteorological plane." According to Aksyonov, the MiG's last message was that the crew completed their flight activities, which happened at an altitude of 4 kilometres (2.5 mi). Aksyonov believes that the pilots made their message, most likely, after exiting the final figure, at low speed in a calm flight, but still at a fairly high altitude. After that, they had to perform a significant speed reduction, and then prepare and go through the cloud layer.

According to research conducted by Soviet Air Force veteran Colonel Eduard Aleksandrovich Shersher, a retired engineer, the probable cause of the disaster was an aircraft collision with the ground as a result of an untimely exit from a dive while performing aerobatics not specified in the flight assignment. The crash was caused in part by a complex meteorological situation (continuous multilayer clouds with a lower edge at an altitude of about 600 metres (2,000 ft)), as well as numerous violations of the requirements of the Flight Operations Manual and the Fighter Aviation Combat Training Course.

=== Conspiracy theories ===
- According to widespread rumours, Gagarin and Seryogin had a glass of vodka before the flight. The official investigation refutes this as no alcohol was found in the blood of the pilots.
- Another theory states that Gagarin had a conflict with the top leadership of the Soviet Union. According to some versions, the death of Gagarin was organised, and the declared disaster was actually a falsification. The rumour further supposes that Gagarin was secretly arrested by the special services and, after minor facial plastic surgery, was placed in one of the provincial psychiatric hospitals. See Soviet space program conspiracy accusations for details.
- There is another theory that Gagarin faked his own death, after which he lived for many years under another name in a village in Orenburg Oblast, where he died due to a hunting accident at a very old age.
