= Valentin Varlamov =

Russian pilot (1934–1980)

- Валентин Варламов
- Born: 15 August 1934; Sukhaya Tereshka, Penza Oblast, Russian SFSR, Soviet Union
- Died: 2 October 1980 (aged 46); Moscow oblast, Soviet Union
- Occupation: Pilot
- Space career

Soviet Union test cosmonaut
- Rank: Lieutenant Colonel (Podpolkovnik), Soviet Air Force
- Selection: Air Force Group 1

Valentin Stepanovich Varlamov (Russian: Валентин Степанович Варламов; 15 August 1934 – 2 October 1980) was a Russian jet pilot who was selected for Air Force Group 1, the first intake of 20 cosmonaut candidates in 1960. After his disqualification from the space program on medical grounds, he was an instructor at the cosmonaut training centre outside Moscow.

== Early life ==
Varlamov was born on 15 August 1934 in Sukhaya Tereshka in the Talchinska district of the Penza oblast.

After World War II, Varlamov's family moved to Kyrgyzstan where Varlamov continued his schooling. Among his classmates was fellow future cosmonaut candidate, Mars Rafikov, who was almost a year older. His family then moved to the Orenburg region where Varlamov completed his schooling.

He attended the Air Force introductory school in western Siberia, followed by the Kacha Higher Air Force school and finally the Stalingrad (Volgograd) Military Aviation school where he graduated with a commission as a pilot. He gained his lieutenant's wings in 1955.

By 1956, Varlamov was a fighter pilot with the 3rd Guards Fighter Aviation Regiment which was responsible for the defence of Orel. He was made chief pilot in the regiment and promoted to senior lieutenant.

== Cosmonaut selection ==
Varlamov was one of 20 young pilots selected for Air Force Group 1 in April 1960, aged 25.

=== Training ===
Varlamov began training with Rafikov, Anatoly Kartashov on 28 April 1960 as a military pilot, third class. Varlamov showed great potential as a cosmonaut candidate, being physically fit and highly intelligent. With the completion of the Vostok simulator, he was selected for a special group of six candidates for accelerated training, along with Yuri Gagarin, Anatoly Kartashov, Andrian Nikolayev, Pavel Popovich and Gherman Titov. Known as the "Sochi Six", this group's purpose was to train the best of the existing candidates of TsPK and enable selectors to choose the candidate who would be first in space.

=== Discharge ===
In 1960 Varlamov was promoted to captain. While on holiday in June that year with other cosmonaut candidates Georgy Shonin and Valery Bykovsky at Medvezh'i Ozyora (Bear Lakes) near Moscow, Varlamov suffered a neck injury after diving into shallow water. While he recovered from a displaced vertebra, medical officers found further anomalies in his bone structure and he was medically disqualified from the program. He was discharged in 1961 and his place was taken by Bykovsky.

=== Cosmonaut Training Centre ===
Despite his discharge Varlamov did not leave the cosmonaut training centre as other unsuccessful candidates had done. He was well regarded by his peers and continued to work in the TsPK in administrative roles until the flight of Vostok 1 where he served as "deputy chief of the command point for controlling space flights."

In 1963 he became a senior instructor specialising in astronavigation at the cosmonaut training centre. Fellow cosmonaut Gherman Titov noted that despite his removal from the program, "The stars above pulled at him." He continued to work within various departments of the cosmonaut training centre and was promoted to major in 1964, followed by lieutenant colonel in 1968.

He left the TsPK in 1966 and died in 1980 after an accident. He is buried at Leonikha near the TsPK (Star City).
