= Anatoly Kartashov =

Anatoly Kartashov may refer to:

- Anatoly Kartashov (water polo)
- Anatoly Kartashov (cosmonaut)
