= Novosyolovo, Vladimir Oblast =

Novosyolovo Новосёлово
- Village
- Location within Vladimir Oblast Location within Russia
- Coordinates: 56°03′N 39°03′E
- Country: Russia
- Region: Vladimir Oblast
- District: Kirzhachsky District
- Time zone: UTC+3:00

Novosyolovo (Russian: Новосёлово) is a rural locality (a village) in Kiprevskoye Rural Settlement, Kirzhachsky District, Vladimir Oblast, Russia. The population was 643 as of 2010.

== History ==
Yuri Gagarin, the first person to orbit the Earth, died in a plane crash near Novosyolovo in 1968.

== Geography ==
Novosyolovo is located 18 km southeast of Kirzhach (the district's administrative centre) by road. Bukhlovo is the nearest rural locality.
