= Yuri Gagarin =

Soviet pioneer cosmonaut (1934–1968)

- Юрий Гагарин
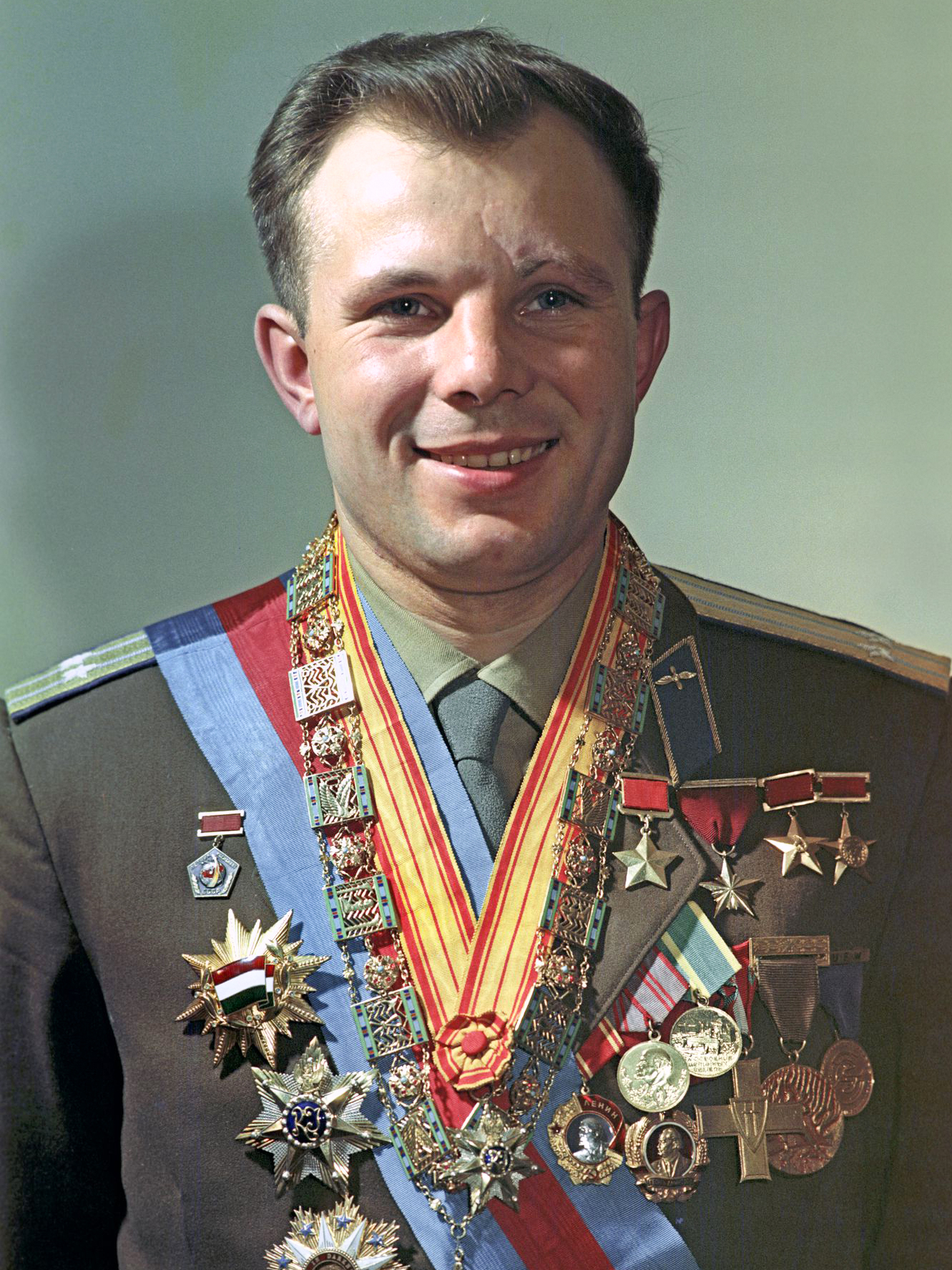
- Gagarin in 1963
- Born: 9 March 1934; Klushino, Russian SFSR, Soviet Union
- Died: 27 March 1968 (aged 34); Novosyolovo, Russian SFSR, Soviet Union
- Cause of death: Plane crash
- Resting place: Kremlin Wall Necropolis, Moscow
- Occupations: Pilot; cosmonaut
- Spouse: Valentina Goryacheva (m. 1957)
- Children: 2; including Yelena
- Awards: Hero of the Soviet Union; Order of Lenin; Pilot–Cosmonaut of the USSR
- Space career

Soviet cosmonaut
- Time in space: 1 hour, 48 minutes
- Selection: Air Forces Group 1 (1960)
- Mission: Vostok 1
- Military career
- Branch: Soviet Air Forces
- Service years: 1957–1968
- Rank: Polkovnik (Colonel)

Yuri Alekseyevich Gagarin (Note: Russian: Юрий Алексеевич Гагарин, IPA: [ˈjʉrʲɪj ɐlʲɪkˈsʲejɪvʲɪdʑ‿ɡɐˈɡarʲɪn]; Gagarin's first name is sometimes transliterated as Yuriy, Youri, or Yury. In this name that follows East Slavic naming customs, the patronymic is Alekseyevich and the family name is Gagarin.) (9 March 1934 – 27 March 1968) was a Soviet pilot and cosmonaut who became the first person to journey into outer space during the first successful crewed spaceflight. He was launched from the Baikonur Cosmodrome in the Kazakh SSR. Travelling on Vostok 1, Gagarin completed one orbit of Earth on 12 April 1961. The flight took 108 minutes. By achieving this major milestone for the Soviet Union amidst the Space Race, he became an international celebrity and earned numerous accolades, including his country's highest distinction: Hero of the Soviet Union.

Born in the village of Klushino in the Russian SFSR, Gagarin was a foundryman at a steel plant in Lyubertsy in his youth. He later joined the Soviet Air Forces as a pilot and was stationed at the Luostari Air Base, near the Norway–Soviet Union border, before his selection for the Soviet space programme alongside five other cosmonauts. Following his spaceflight, Gagarin became the deputy training director of the Cosmonaut Training Centre, which was later named after him. He was also elected as a deputy of the Soviet of the Union in 1962 and then to the Soviet of Nationalities, the lower and upper chambers of the Supreme Soviet respectively.

Vostok 1 was Gagarin's only spaceflight, but he served as the backup crew to Soyuz 1, which ended in a fatal crash, killing his friend and fellow cosmonaut Vladimir Komarov. Fearful that a high-level national hero might be killed, Soviet officials banned Gagarin from participating in further spaceflights. After completing training at the Zhukovsky Air Force Engineering Academy in February 1968, he was again allowed to fly regular aircraft. However, Gagarin died five weeks later, when the MiG-15 that he was piloting with flight instructor Vladimir Seryogin crashed near the town of Kirzhach.

== Early life ==
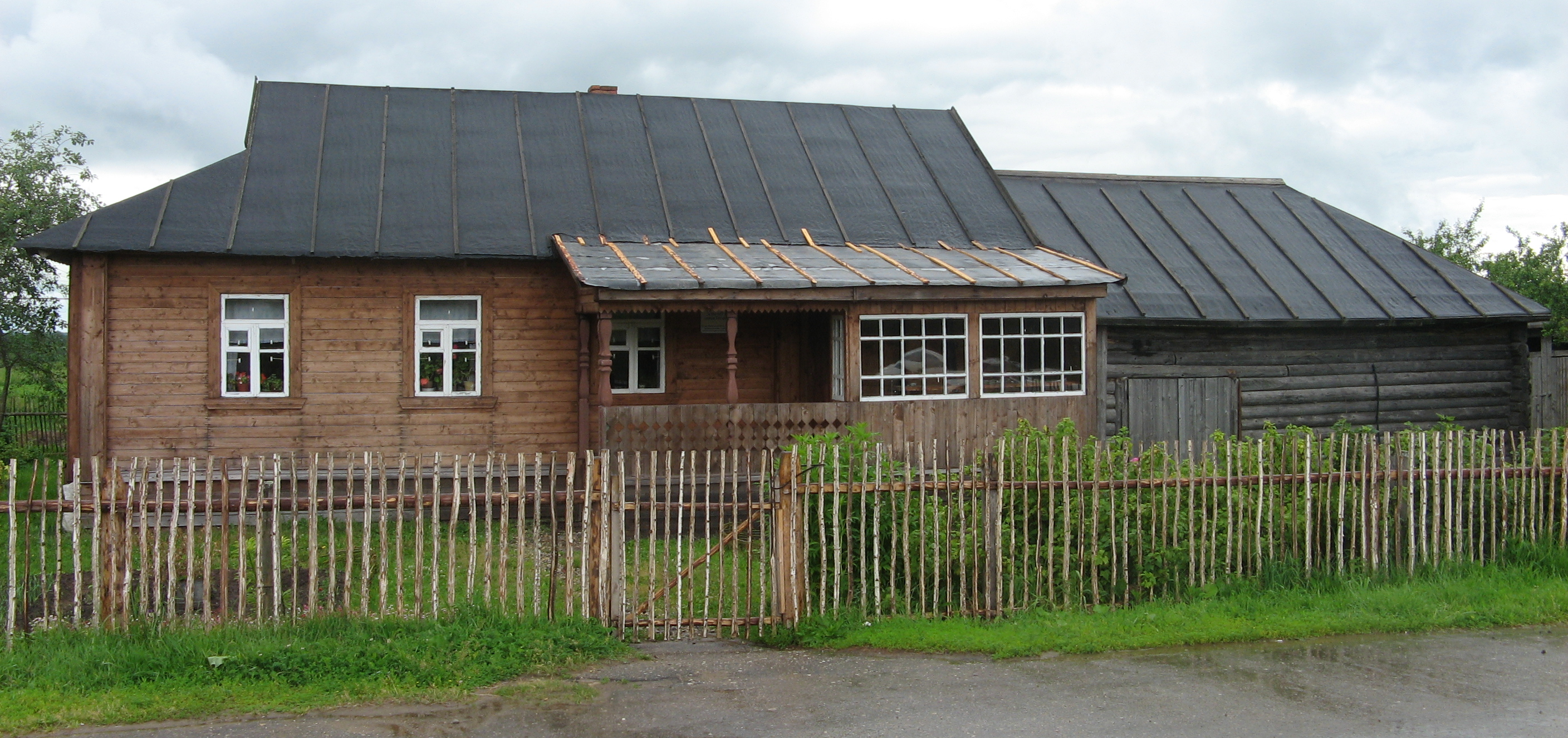
Gagarin family home in Klushino

Gagarin was born on 9 March 1934 in the village of Klushino, in the Western Oblast of the Russian SFSR, near Gzhatsk (renamed Gagarin in 1968 after his death). His parents were ethnic Russians and worked on a sovkhoz—Aleksey Ivanovich Gagarin as a carpenter and Anna Timofeyevna Gagarina as a dairy farmer. (Note: Alexey and Anna's names are sometimes transliterated as Aleksei Ivanovich and Anna Timofeevna, respectively.) Yuri was the third of their four children. His elder brother Valentin was born in 1924, and by the time Yuri was born he was already helping with the cattle on the farm. His sister Zoya, born in 1927, helped take care of "Yura" and their youngest brother Boris, born in 1936.

Like millions of Soviet citizens, his family suffered during the German occupation during World War II. During the German advance on Moscow, retreating Red Army soldiers seized the collective farm's livestock. The Nazis captured Klushino on 18 October 1941. On their first day in the village, they burned down the school, ending Yuri's first year of education. The Germans also burned down 27 houses in the village and forced the residents, including the Gagarins, to work the farms to feed the occupying soldiers. Those who refused were beaten or sent to the concentration camp set up at Gzhatsk.

A Nazi officer took over the Gagarin residence. On the land behind their house, the family was allowed to build a mud hut measuring approximately 3 by 3 metres (10 by 10 ft), where they spent 21 months until the end of the occupation. During this period, Yuri became a saboteur, especially after one of the German soldiers (called "the Devil" by the children) tried to hang his younger brother Boris on an apple tree using the boy's scarf. In retaliation, Yuri sabotaged the soldier's work; he poured soil into the tank batteries gathered to be recharged and randomly mixed the different chemical supplies intended for the task. In early 1943, his two elder siblings were deported by the Germans to Poland for slave labour. They escaped and were found by Soviet soldiers who conscripted them into helping with the war effort. They did not return home until 1945, after the war.

The rest of the Gagarin family believed the two elder children were dead. Yuri's father was overcome with "grief and hunger" and often sickly; he was beaten for refusing to work for the German occupiers. He spent the remainder of the war at a hospital as a patient and later as an orderly. Yuri's mother was hospitalized during the same period, after a soldier gashed her leg with a scythe. Aleksey helped the Red Army find mines buried in the roads by the fleeing Germans following their rout out of Klushino on 9 March 1943.

== Education and early career ==
In 1946, the family moved to Gzhatsk, where Gagarin continued his education. Yuri and Boris were enrolled at a crude school built in the town and run by a young woman who volunteered to be the teacher. They learned to read using a discarded Soviet military manual. A former Soviet airman later joined the school to teach maths and science, Yuri's favourite subjects. Yuri was also part of a group of children who built model aeroplanes. He was fascinated with aircraft from a young age and his interest in aeroplanes was energised after a Yakovlev fighter plane crash-landed in Klushino during the war.

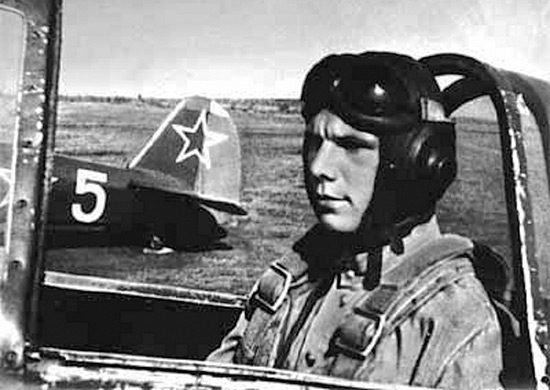
Gagarin as an air cadet in the Saratov flying club c. 1954

In 1950, aged 16, Gagarin began an apprenticeship as a foundryman at a steel plant in Lyubertsy, near Moscow, and enrolled at a local "young workers" school for seventh-grade evening classes. After graduating in 1951 from both the seventh grade and the vocational school with honours in mouldmaking and foundry work, he was selected for further training at the Industrial Technical School in Saratov, where he studied tractors. While in Saratov, Gagarin volunteered at a local flying club for weekend training as a Soviet air cadet, where he trained to fly a biplane, and later a Yakovlev Yak-18. He earned extra money as a part-time dock labourer on the River Volga.

== Soviet Air Force service ==
In 1955, Gagarin was accepted to the First Chkalov Higher Air Force Pilots School in Orenburg. He initially began training on the Yak-18 already familiar to him and later graduated to training on the MiG-15 in February 1956. Gagarin twice struggled to land the two-seater trainer aircraft and risked dismissal from pilot training. However, the commander of the regiment decided to give him another chance at landing. Gagarin's flight instructor gave him a cushion to sit on, which improved his view from the cockpit, and he landed successfully. Having completed his evaluation in a trainer aircraft, Gagarin began flying solo in 1957.

On 5 November 1957, Gagarin was commissioned a lieutenant in the Soviet Air Forces, having accumulated 166 hours and 47 minutes of flight time. He graduated from flight school the next day and was posted to the Luostari Air Base, close to the Norwegian border in Murmansk Oblast, for a two-year assignment with the Northern Fleet. He was assigned to the 769th Fighter Aviation Regiment of the 122nd Fighter Aviation Division flying Mikoyan-Gurevich MiG-15bis aircraft. By October 1959, he had flown a total of 265 hours.

On 7 July 1959, he was rated Military Pilot 3rd Class. After expressing interest in space exploration following the launch of Luna 3 on 6 October 1959, his recommendation to the Soviet space programme was endorsed and forwarded by Lieutenant Colonel Babushkin. By this point, he had accumulated 265 hours of flight time. Gagarin was promoted to the rank of senior lieutenant on 6 November 1959, three weeks after he was interviewed by a medical commission for qualification to the space programme.

== Soviet space programme ==
=== Selection and training ===
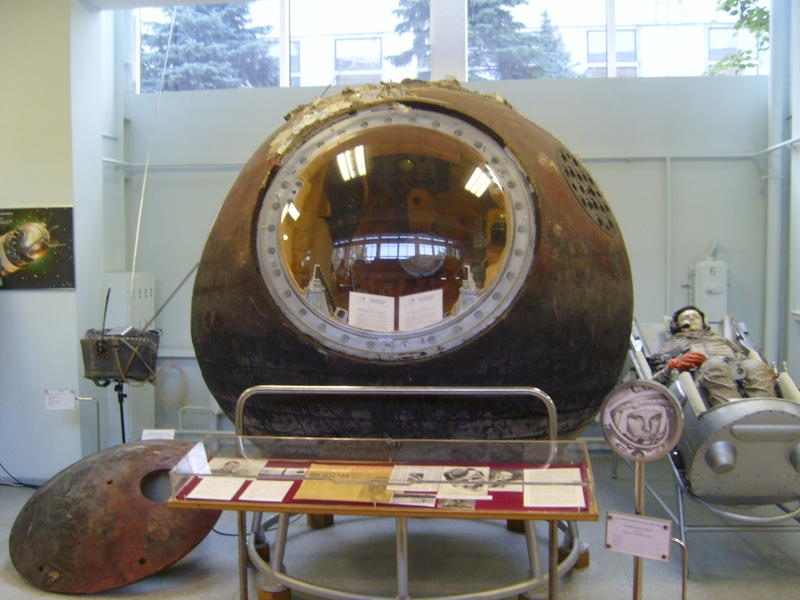
Gagarin's Vostok 3KA capsule and an effigy of him on display at the RKK Energiya museum in 2010

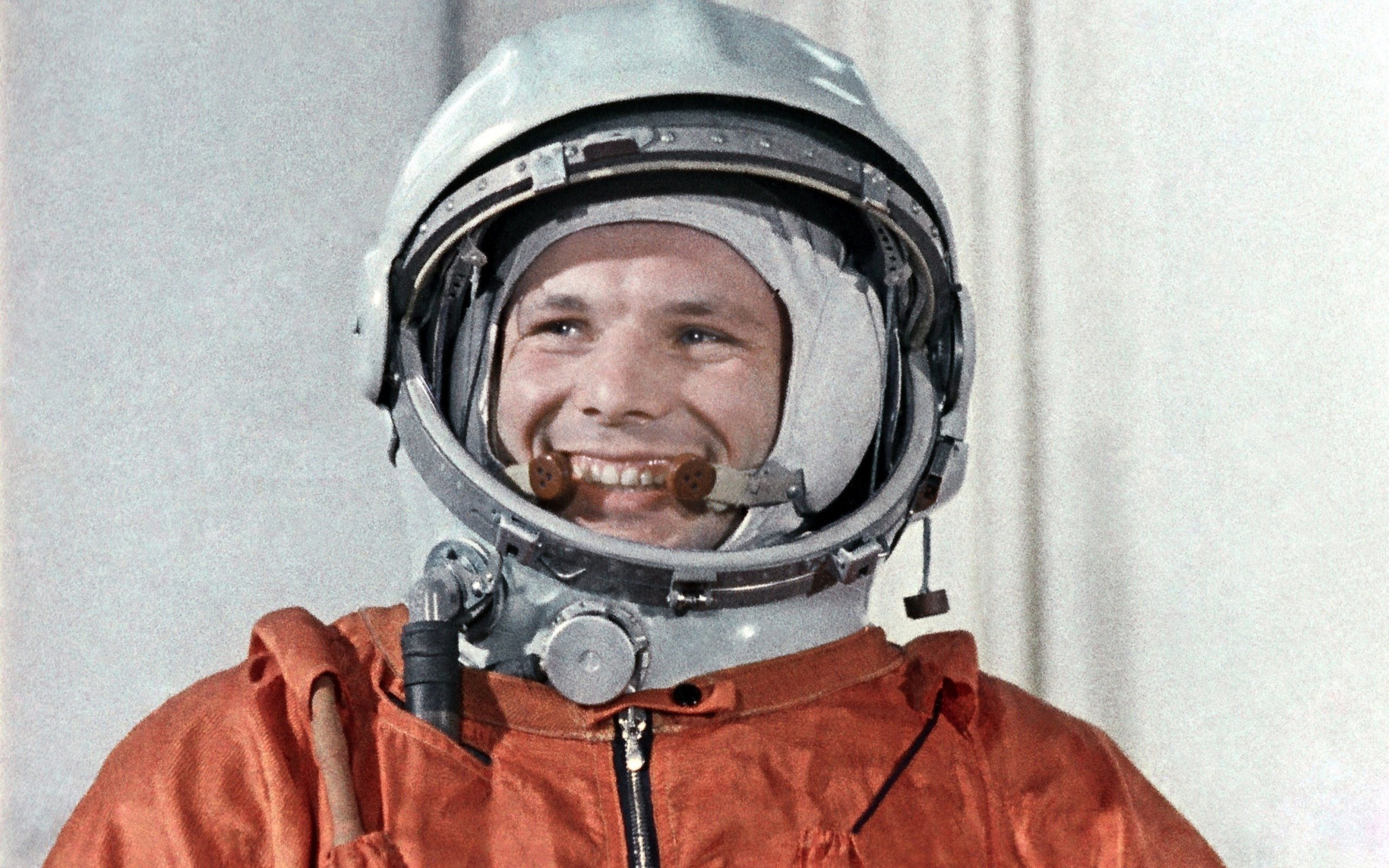
Gagarin in his Vostok 1 spacesuit on 12 April 1961

Gagarin's selection for the Vostok programme was overseen by the Central Flight Medical Commission led by Major General Konstantin Fyodorovich Borodin of the Soviet Army Medical Service. He underwent physical and psychological testing conducted at Central Aviation Scientific-Research Hospital, in Moscow, commanded by Colonel A.S. Usanov, a member of the commission. The commission also included Colonel Yevgeniy Anatoliyevich Karpov, who later commanded the training centre, Colonel Vladimir Ivanovich Yazdovskiy, the head physician for Gagarin's flight, and Major-General Aleksandr Nikolayevich Babiychuk, a physician flag officer on the Soviet Air Force General Staff to the Commander in Chief of the Air Force. The commission limited its selection to pilots between 25 and 30 years old. The chief engineer of the programme Sergei Korolev also specified that candidates, to fit in the limited space in the Vostok capsule, should weigh less than 72 kg (159 lb) and be no taller than 1.70 metres (5 ft 7 in); Gagarin was 1.57 metres (5 ft 2 in) tall.

From a pool of 154 qualified pilots short-listed by their Air Force units, the military physicians chose 29 cosmonaut candidates, of whom 20 were approved by the Credential Committee of the Soviet government. The first twelve, including Gagarin, were approved on 7 March 1960 and eight more were added in a series of subsequent orders issued until June. (Note: The first twelve announced on 7 March 1960 were Lieutenant Alexei Leonov, Senior Lieutenants Ivan Anikeyev, Valery Bykovsky, Yuri Gagarin, Viktor Gorbatko, Grigori Nelyubov, Andriyan Nikolayev, German Titov, Boris Volynov, and Georgy Shonin, Captain Pavel Popovich and Engineer Captain Vladimir Komarov. On 9 March 1960, Senior Lieutenant Yevgeny Khrunov was added. Senior Lieutenants Dmitri Zaikin and Valentin Filatyev joined the group on 25 March. They were followed by Major Pavel Belyayev and Senior Lieutenants Valentin Bondarenko, Valentin Varlamov and Mars Rafikov, who joined on 28 April 1960. Captain Anatoly Kartashov was the last to join in June 1960.)

Gagarin began training at the Khodynka Airfield in central Moscow on 15 March 1960. The training regimen involved vigorous and repetitive physical exercises, which Alexei Leonov, a member of the initial group of twelve, described as akin to training for the Olympic Games. In April 1960, they began parachute training in Saratov Oblast and each man completed about 40 to 50 jumps from both low and high altitudes, over both land and water.

Gagarin was a candidate favoured by his peers; when they were asked to vote anonymously for a candidate besides themselves they would like to be the first to fly, all but three chose Gagarin. One of these candidates, Yevgeny Khrunov, believed that Gagarin was very focused and was demanding of himself and others when necessary. On 30 May 1960, Gagarin was further selected for an accelerated training group, known as the Vanguard Six or Sochi Six, (Note: The group was also nicknamed the "Lilies" by their fellow cosmonauts, a reference to "Lilies of the Valley", a song by composer Oscar Feltsman.) from which the first cosmonauts of the Vostok programme would be chosen. The other members of the group were Anatoly Kartashov, Andriyan Nikolayev, Pavel Popovich, Gherman Titov, and Valentin Varlamov. However, Kartashov and Varlamov were injured and replaced by Khrunov and Grigory Nelyubov.

As several of the candidates selected for the programme including Gagarin did not have higher education degrees, they were enrolled in a correspondence course programme at the Zhukovsky Air Force Engineering Academy. Gagarin enrolled in September 1960 and did not earn his specialist diploma until early 1968. Gagarin was also subjected to experiments that were designed to test physical and psychological endurance, including oxygen starvation tests in which the cosmonauts were locked in an isolation chamber and the air was slowly pumped out. He also trained for the upcoming flight by experiencing g-forces in a centrifuge. Psychological tests included placing the candidates in an anechoic chamber in complete isolation; Gagarin was in the chamber from 26 July to 5 August. In August 1960, a Soviet Air Force doctor evaluated his personality as follows:

Modest; gets embarrassed when his humour gets a little too racy; high degree of intellectual development evident in Yuriy; fantastic memory; distinguishes himself from his colleagues by his sharp and far-ranging sense of attention to his surroundings; a well-developed imagination; quick reactions; persevering, prepares himself painstakingly for his activities and training exercises, handles celestial mechanics and mathematical formulae with ease as well as excels in higher mathematics; does not feel constrained when he has to defend his point of view if he considers himself right; appears that he understands life better than a lot of his friends.

The Vanguard Six were given the title of pilot-cosmonaut in January 1961 and underwent a two-day examination conducted by a special interdepartmental commission led by Lieutenant-General Nikolai Kamanin, the overseer of the Vostok programme. The commission was tasked with ranking the candidates based on their mission readiness for the first human Vostok mission. On 17 January, they were tested in a simulator at the M. M. Gromov Flight-Research Institute on a full-size mockup of the Vostok capsule. Gagarin, Nikolayev, Popovich, and Titov all received excellent marks on the first day of testing, in which they were required to describe the various phases of the mission followed by questions from the commission. On the second day, they were given a written examination, following which the special commission ranked Gagarin as the best candidate. He and the next two highest-ranked cosmonauts, Titov and Nelyubov, were sent to Tyuratam for final preparations. Gagarin and Titov were selected to train in the flight-ready spacecraft on 7 April. Historian Asif Azam Siddiqi writes of the final selection:

In the end, at the State Commission meeting on April 8, Kamanin stood up and formally nominated Gagarin as the primary pilot and Titov as his backup. Without much discussion, the commission approved the proposal and moved on to other last-minute logistical issues. It was assumed that in the event Gagarin developed health problems prior to liftoff, Titov would take his place, with Nelyubov acting as his backup.

=== Vostok 1 ===
Poyekhali!
Gagarin's voice

On 12 April 1961, at 6:07 am UTC, the Vostok 3KA-3 (Vostok 1) spacecraft was launched from Baikonur Cosmodrome. Aboard was Gagarin, the first human to travel into space, using the call sign Kedr (Кедр, Siberian pine or cedar). The radio communication between the launch control room and Gagarin included the following dialogue at the moment of rocket launch:

Korolev: Preliminary stage ... intermediate... main... LIFT-OFF! We wish you a good flight. Everything's all right.
Gagarin: Off we go! Goodbye, until [we meet] soon, dear friends.

Gagarin's farewell to Korolev using the informal phrase Poyehali! (Поехали!, 'Off we go!') (Note: Some sources translate this phrase as "Let's go!") later became a popular expression in the Eastern Bloc that was used to refer to the beginning of the Space Age. The five first-stage engines fired until the first separation event, when the four side boosters fell away, leaving the core engine. The core stage then separated while the rocket was in a suborbital trajectory, and the upper stage carried it to orbit. Once the upper stage finished firing, it separated from the spacecraft, which orbited for 108 minutes before returning to Earth in Kazakhstan. Gagarin became the first human to orbit the Earth.

An April 1961 newsreel of Gagarin arriving in Moscow to be greeted by First Secretary Nikita Khrushchev

"The feeling of weightlessness was somewhat unfamiliar compared with Earth conditions. Here, you feel as if you were hanging in a horizontal position in straps. You feel as if you are suspended", Gagarin wrote in his post-flight report. He also wrote in his autobiography released the same year that he sang the tune "The Motherland Hears, The Motherland Knows" ("Родина слышит, Родина знает") during re-entry. Gagarin was recognised as a qualified Military Pilot 1st Class and promoted to the rank of major in a special order given during his flight.

At about 7,000 metres (23,000 ft), Gagarin ejected from the descending capsule as planned and landed using a parachute. There were concerns that Gagarin's orbital spaceflight records for duration, altitude, and lifted mass would not be recognized by the Fédération Aéronautique Internationale (FAI), the world governing body for setting standards and keeping records in the field, which at the time required that the pilot land with the craft. Gagarin and Soviet officials initially refused to admit that he had not landed with his spacecraft, an omission which became apparent after Titov's flight on Vostok 2 four months later. Gagarin's spaceflight records were nonetheless certified and reaffirmed by the FAI, which revised its rules, and acknowledged that the crucial steps of the safe launch, orbit, and return of the pilot had been accomplished. Gagarin is internationally recognised as the first human in space and the first to orbit the Earth. Among the technical gear he wore to space, he kept the time from the Sturmanskie watch on his wrist.

== After the Vostok 1 flight ==
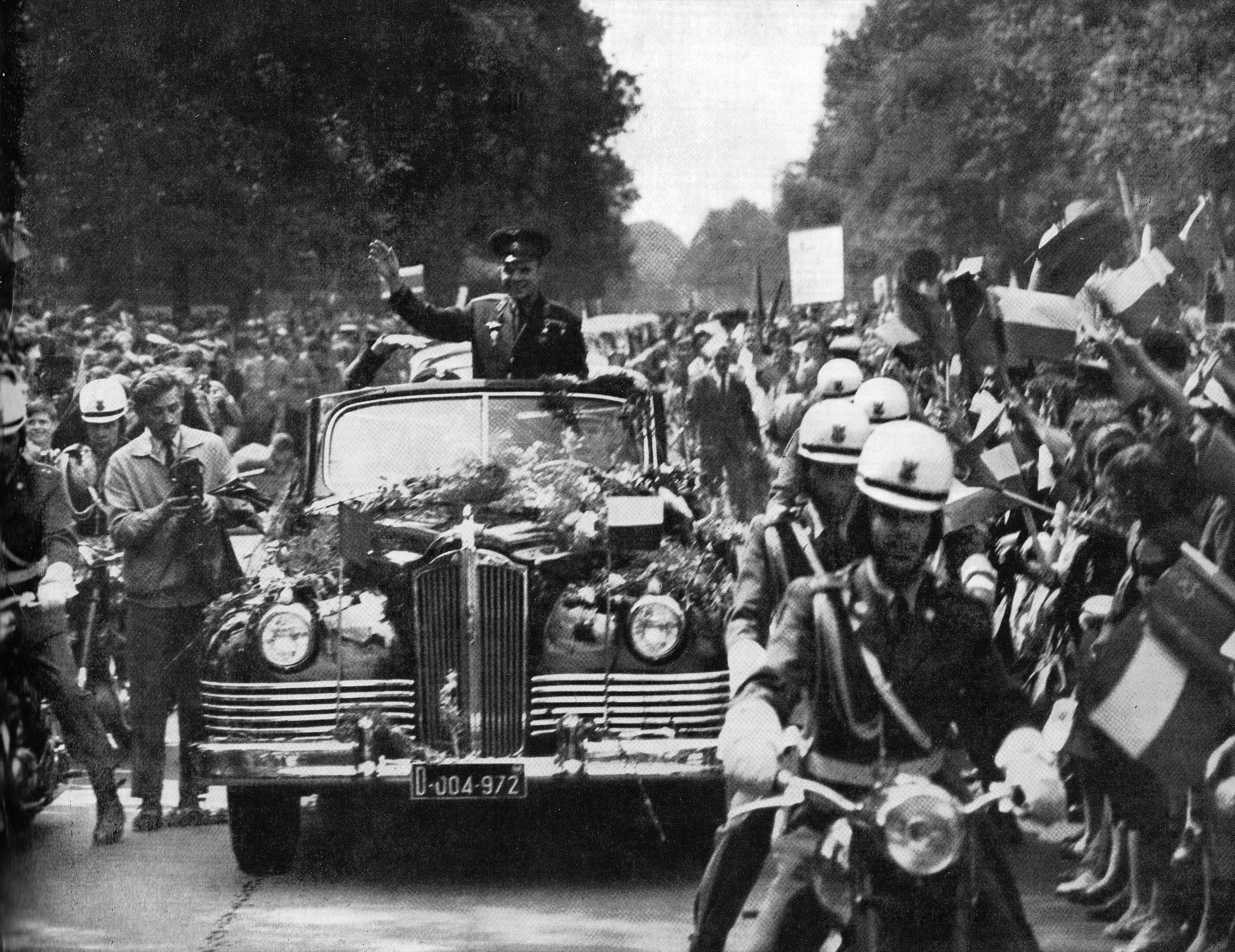
Gagarin in Warsaw, 1961

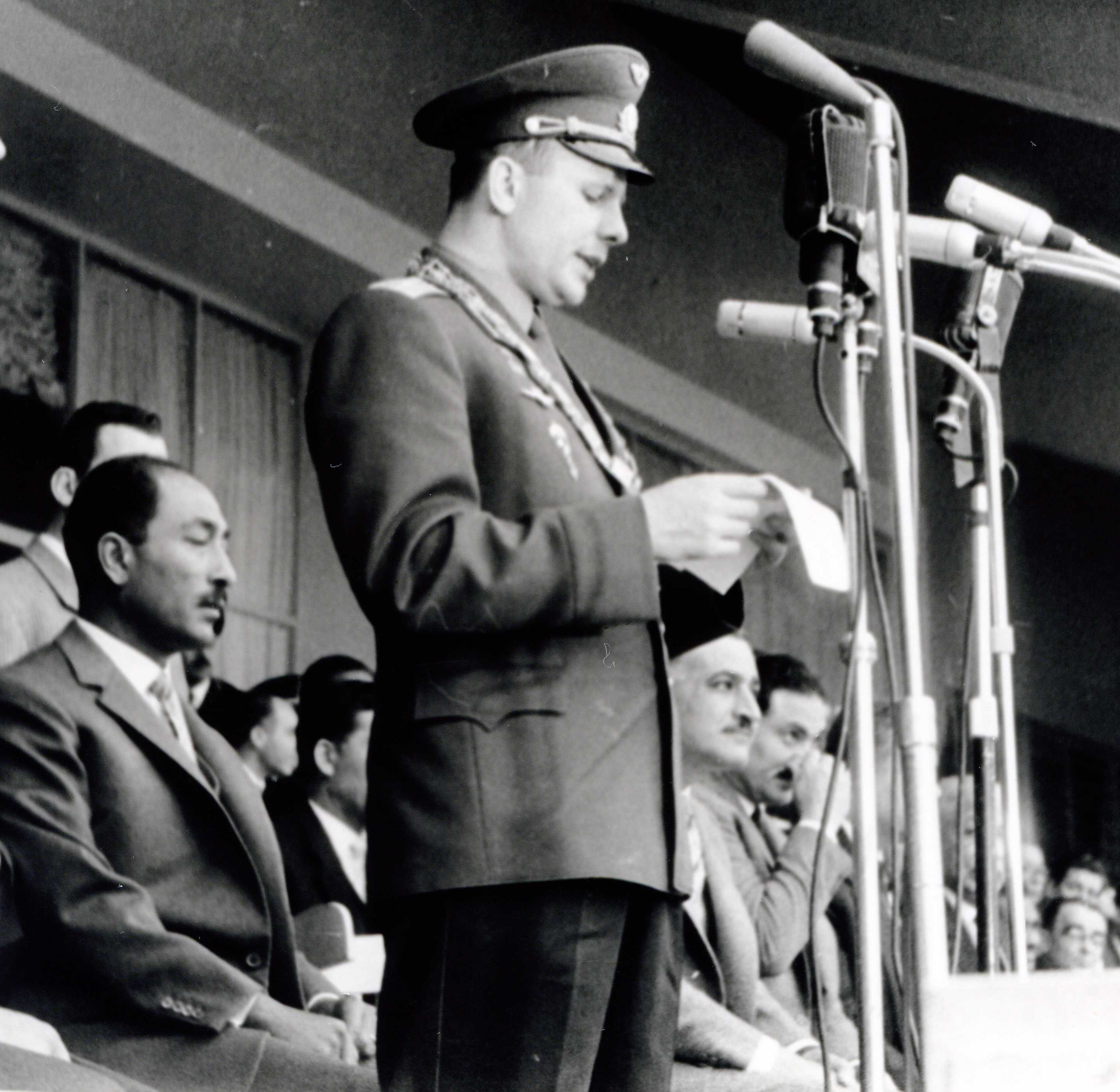
Gagarin with Egypt's president Gamal Abdel Nasser and Parliament Speaker Anwar Sadat in a speech at Cairo Stadium, 1961

Gagarin's flight was a triumph for the Soviet space programme and he became a national hero of the Soviet Union and the Eastern Bloc, as well as a worldwide celebrity. Newspapers around the globe published his biography and details of his flight. He was escorted in a long motorcade of high-ranking officials through the streets of Moscow to the Kremlin where, in a lavish ceremony, Nikita Khrushchev awarded him the title Hero of the Soviet Union. Other cities in the Soviet Union also held mass demonstrations, the scale of which was second only to the World War II Victory Parades.

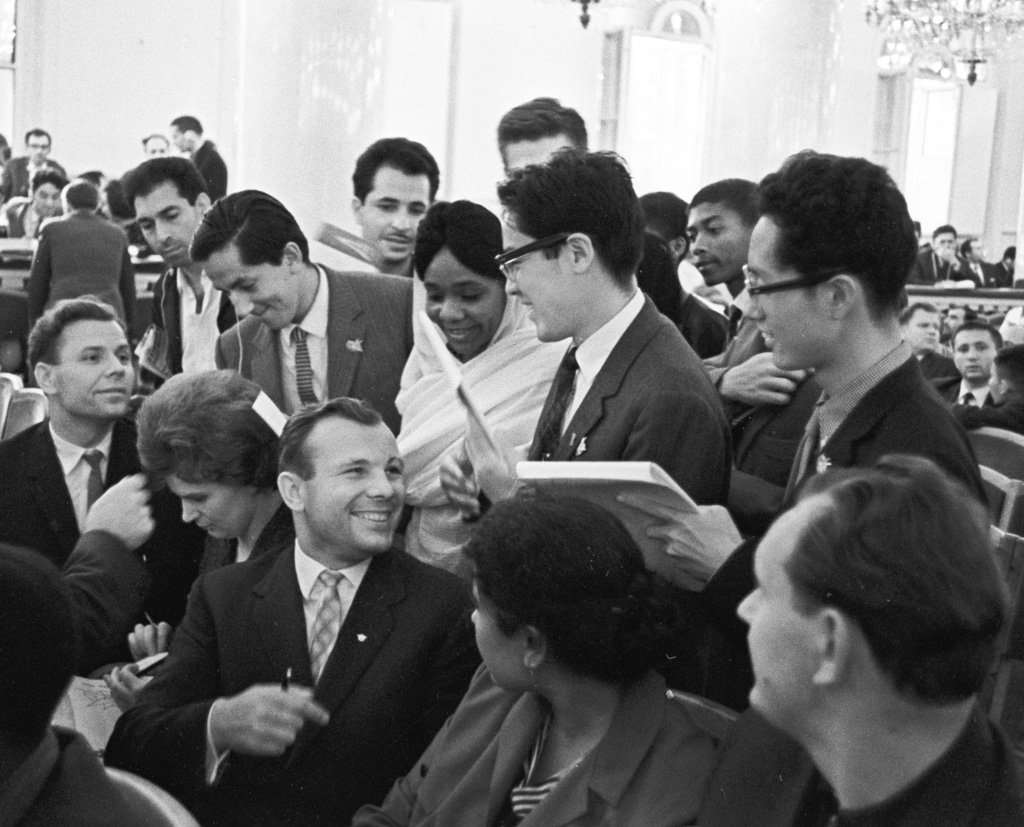
Gagarin and Valentina Tereshkova (seated to his right) signing autographs at a youth forum in 1964

Gagarin gained a reputation as an adept public figure and was noted for his charismatic smile. On 15 April 1961, accompanied by officials from the Soviet Academy of Sciences, he answered questions at a press conference in Moscow reportedly attended by 1,000 reporters. Gagarin visited the United Kingdom three months after the Vostok 1 mission, going to London and Manchester. While in Manchester, despite heavy rain, he refused an umbrella, insisted that the roof of the convertible car he was riding in remain open, and stood so the cheering crowds could see him. Gagarin toured widely abroad, accepting the invitation of about 30 countries in the years following his flight. In just the first four months, he also went to Poland, Brazil, Bulgaria, Canada, Cuba, Czechoslovakia, Finland, Hungary, and Iceland. Because of his popularity, US President John F. Kennedy barred Gagarin from visiting the United States.

In 1962, Gagarin began serving as a deputy to the Soviet of the Union, and was elected to the Central Committee of the Young Communist League. He later returned to Star City, the cosmonaut facility, where he spent several years working on designs for a reusable spacecraft. He became a lieutenant colonel of the Soviet Air Forces on 12 June 1962 and received the rank of colonel on 6 November 1963. On 20 December, Gagarin became Deputy Training Director of the cosmonaut training facility. Soviet officials, including Kamanin, tried to keep Gagarin away from any flights, being worried about losing their hero in an accident noting that he was "too dear to mankind to risk his life for the sake of an ordinary space flight". Kamanin was also concerned by Gagarin's drinking and believed the sudden rise to fame had taken its toll on the cosmonaut. While acquaintances say Gagarin had been a "sensible drinker", his touring schedule placed him in social situations in which he was increasingly expected to drink alcohol.

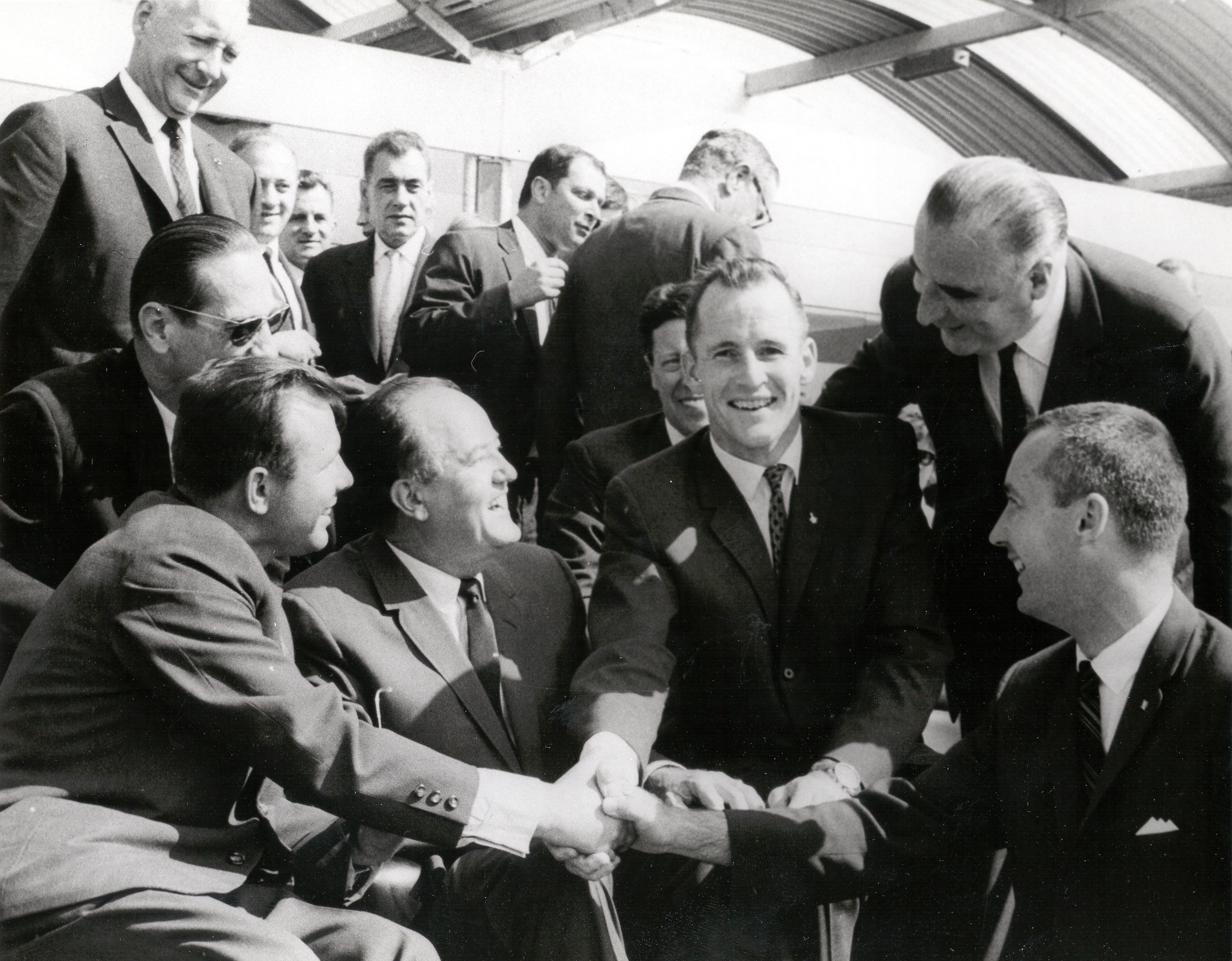
Gagarin with U.S. Vice President Hubert Humphrey, French Prime Minister Georges Pompidou and Gemini 4 astronauts Jim McDivitt and Ed White at the 1965 Paris Air Show

Two years later, he was re-elected as a deputy of the Soviet Union but this time to the Soviet of Nationalities, the upper chamber of the legislature. The following year, he began to re-qualify as a fighter pilot and was a backup pilot for his friend Vladimir Komarov on the Soyuz 1 flight after five years without piloting duty. Kamanin had opposed Gagarin's reassignment to cosmonaut training; Gagarin had gained weight and his flying skills had deteriorated. Despite this, he remained a strong contender for Soyuz 1 until he was replaced by Komarov in April 1966 and reassigned to Soyuz 3.

The Soyuz 1 launch was rushed due to implicit political pressures and despite Gagarin's protests that additional safety precautions were necessary. Gagarin accompanied Komarov to the rocket before launch and relayed instructions to Komarov from ground control following multiple system failures aboard the spacecraft. Despite their best efforts, Soyuz 1 crash-landed after its parachutes failed to open, killing Komarov instantly. After the Soyuz 1 crash, Gagarin was permanently banned from training for and participating in further spaceflights. He was also grounded from flying aircraft solo, a demotion he worked hard to lift. He was temporarily relieved of duties to focus on academics with the promise that he would be able to resume flight training. On 17 February 1968, Gagarin successfully defended his aerospace engineering thesis on the subject of spaceplane aerodynamic configuration and graduated cum laude from the Zhukovsky Air Force Engineering Academy.

== Personal life ==
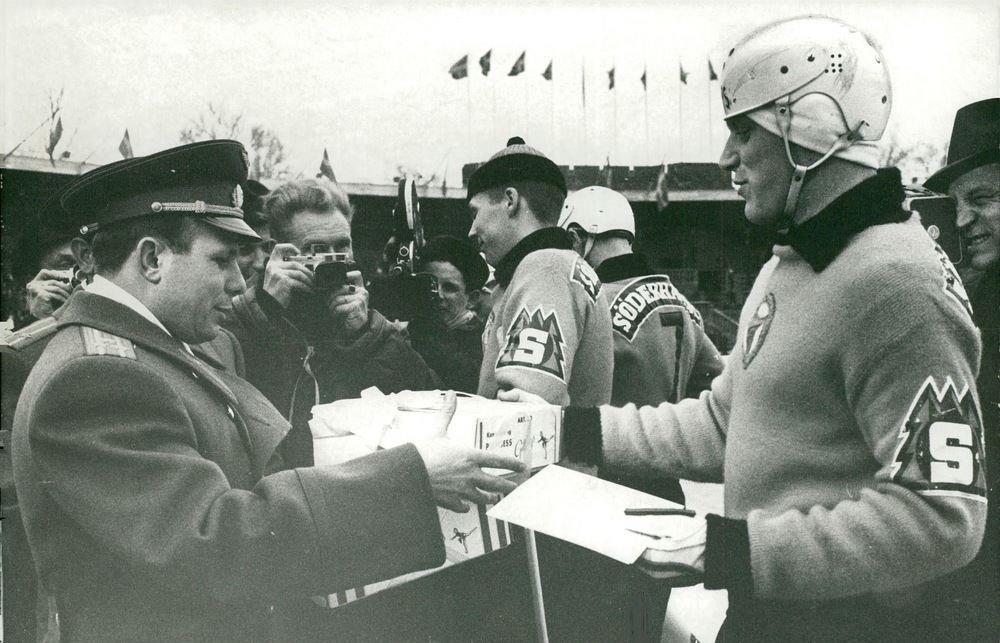
Gagarin and Göran Sedvall at the 1964 Swedish bandy final

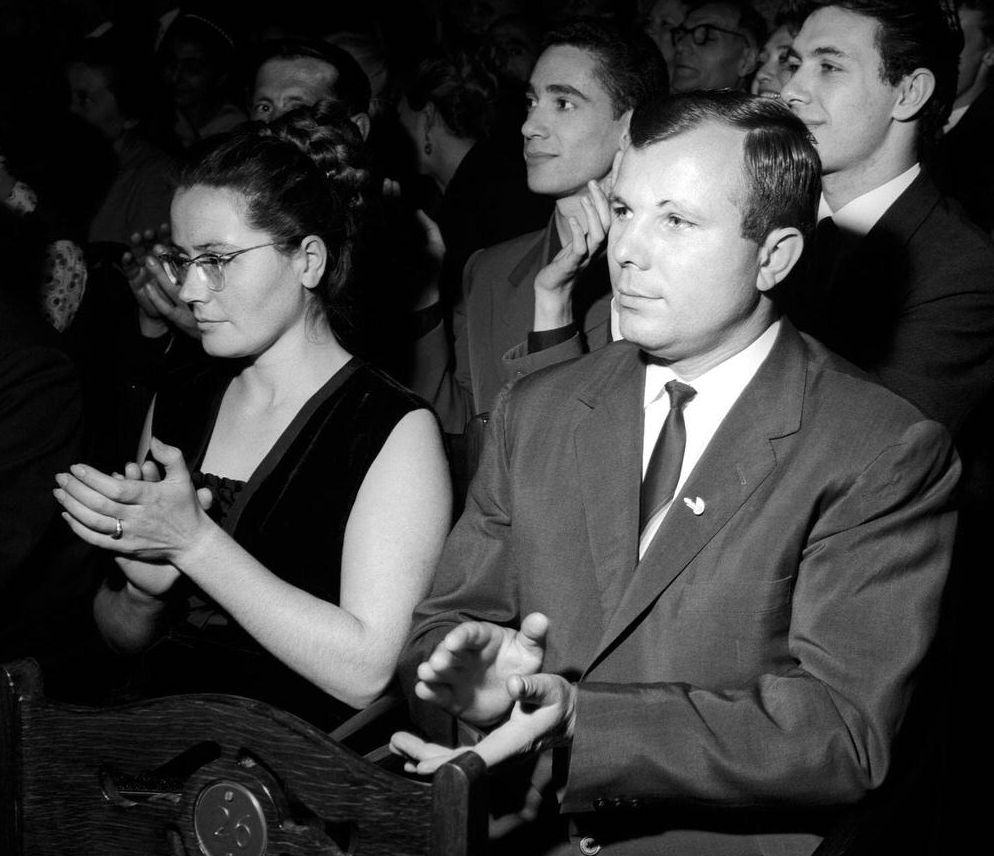
Gagarin and his wife Valentina at a concert in Moscow in 1964

In 1957, while a cadet in flight school, Gagarin met Valentina Goryacheva at the May Day celebrations at the Red Square in Moscow. She was a medical technician who had graduated from Orenburg Medical School. They were married on 7 November of the same year, the same day Gagarin graduated from his flight school. Valentina and Yuri had two daughters. Yelena Yurievna Gagarina, born 1959, is an art historian who has worked as the director general of the Moscow Kremlin Museums since 2001; and Galina Yurievna Gagarina, born 1961, is a professor of economics and the department chair at Plekhanov Russian University of Economics in Moscow. In September 1961 he was seen with an injury on his eyebrow that has been the source of many rumours. The Kamanin diaries, for example, describe an incident where he was allegedly caught inside a nurse's room and jumped out of the window to avoid being seen. However, the official statement provided was that he fell while playing with his daughter.

In his youth, Gagarin was a keen sportsman and played ice hockey as a goalkeeper. He was also a basketball fan and coached the Saratov Industrial Technical School team, as well as being a referee.

Some Soviet sources have said that Gagarin commented during his space flight, "I don't see any god up here", though no such words appear in the verbatim record of his conversations with Earth stations during the spaceflight. In a 2006 interview, Gagarin's friend Colonel Valentin Petrov stated that Gagarin never said these words and that the quote originated from Khrushchev's speech at the plenum of the Central Committee of the CPSU about the state's anti-religion campaign, saying "Gagarin flew into space, but didn't see any god there". Petrov also said Gagarin had been baptised into the Russian Orthodox Church as a child, and a 2011 Foma magazine article quoted the rector of the Orthodox Church in Star City saying, "Gagarin baptized his elder daughter Yelena shortly before his space flight; and his family used to celebrate Christmas and Easter and keep icons in the house". Nevertheless, Gagarin's officially sanctioned autobiography, released by the USSR's state publishing house in 1961, includes a passage that upholds the official Soviet position on religious belief: "The manned space flight was a crushing blow to the churchmen. In the streams of letters that were addressed to me, I was pleased to read confessions in which believers, impressed by the achievements of science, renounced God, agreed that there is no god and everything connected with his name is fiction and nonsense".

== Death ==
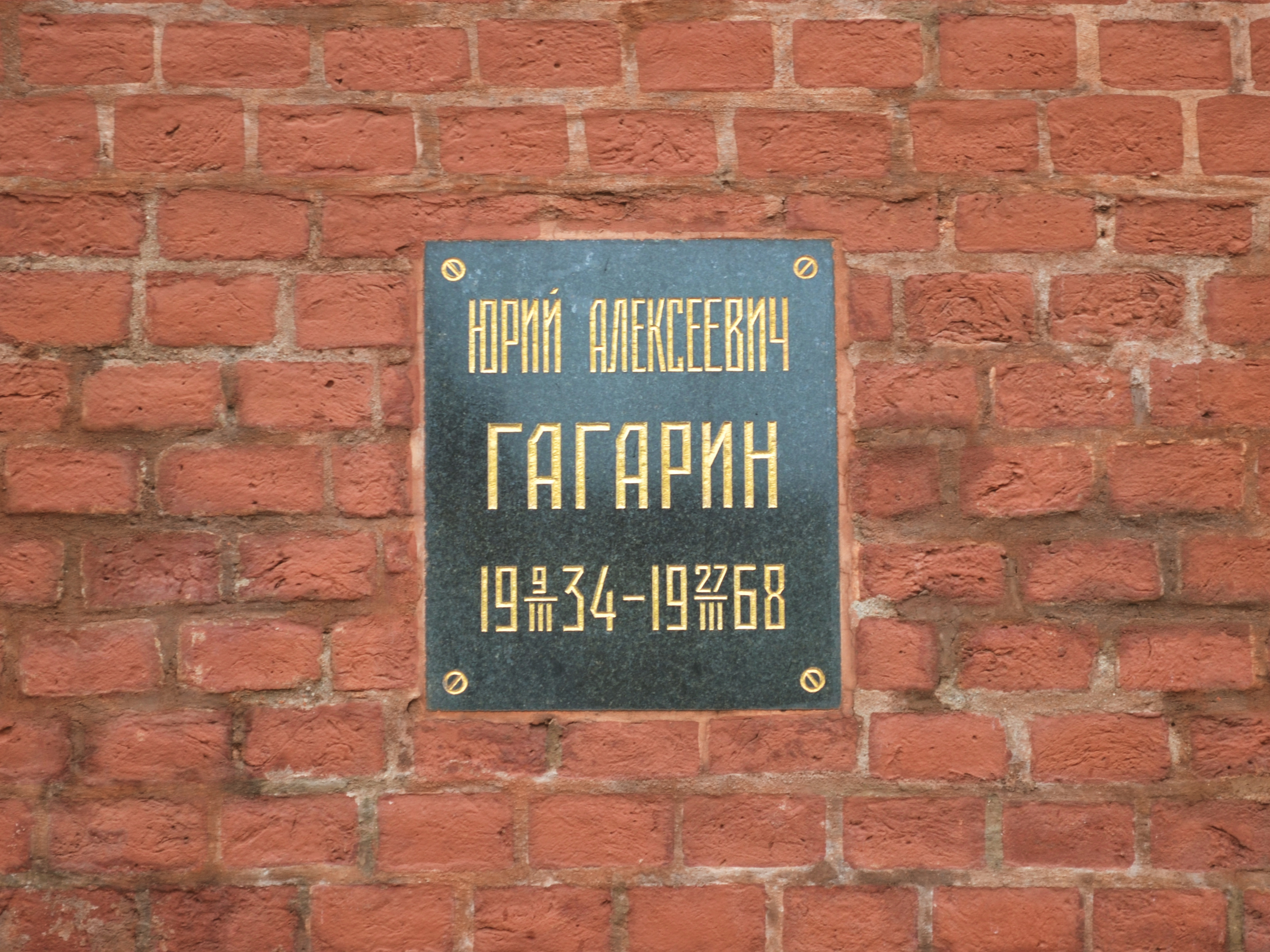
Plaque indicating Gagarin's interment in the Kremlin Wall

On 27 March 1968, while on a routine training flight from Chkalovsky air base, Gagarin and flight instructor Vladimir Seryogin died when their MiG-15UTI crashed near the town of Kirzhach. The bodies of Gagarin and Seryogin were cremated and their ashes interred in the walls of the Kremlin. Wrapped in secrecy, the cause of the crash that killed Gagarin is uncertain and became the subject of speculation, including several conspiracy theories. At least three investigations into the crash were conducted separately by the Soviet Air Force, official government commissions, and the KGB. According to a biography of Gagarin by Jamie Doran and Piers Bizony, Starman: The Truth Behind the Legend of Yuri Gagarin, the KGB worked "not just alongside the Air Force and the official commission members but against them."

The KGB's report, declassified in March 2003, claimed that the actions of airbase personnel contributed to the crash. The report states that an air-traffic controller provided Gagarin with outdated weather information and that by the time of his flight, conditions had deteriorated significantly. The ground crew also left the external fuel tanks attached to the aircraft. Gagarin's planned flight activities needed clear weather and no outboard tanks. The investigation concluded Gagarin's aircraft entered a spin, either due to a bird strike or because of a sudden move to avoid another aircraft. Because of the out-of-date weather report, the crew believed their altitude was higher than it was and could not react properly to bring the MiG-15 out of its spin. Another theory, advanced in 2005 by the original crash investigator, hypothesizes that a cabin air vent was accidentally left open by the crew or the previous pilot, leading to oxygen deprivation and leaving the crew incapable of controlling the aircraft. A similar theory, published in Air & Space/Smithsonian magazine, is that the crew detected the open vent and followed procedure by executing a rapid dive to a lower altitude. This dive caused them to lose consciousness and crash.

On 12 April 2007, the Kremlin vetoed a new investigation into the death of Gagarin. Government officials said they saw no reason to begin a new investigation. In April 2011, documents from a 1968 commission set up by the Central Committee of the Communist Party to investigate the accident were declassified. The documents revealed that the commission's original conclusion was that Gagarin or Seryogin had manoeuvred sharply, either to avoid a weather balloon or to avoid "entry into the upper limit of the first layer of cloud cover", leading the jet into a "super-critical flight regime and to its stalling in complex meteorological conditions".

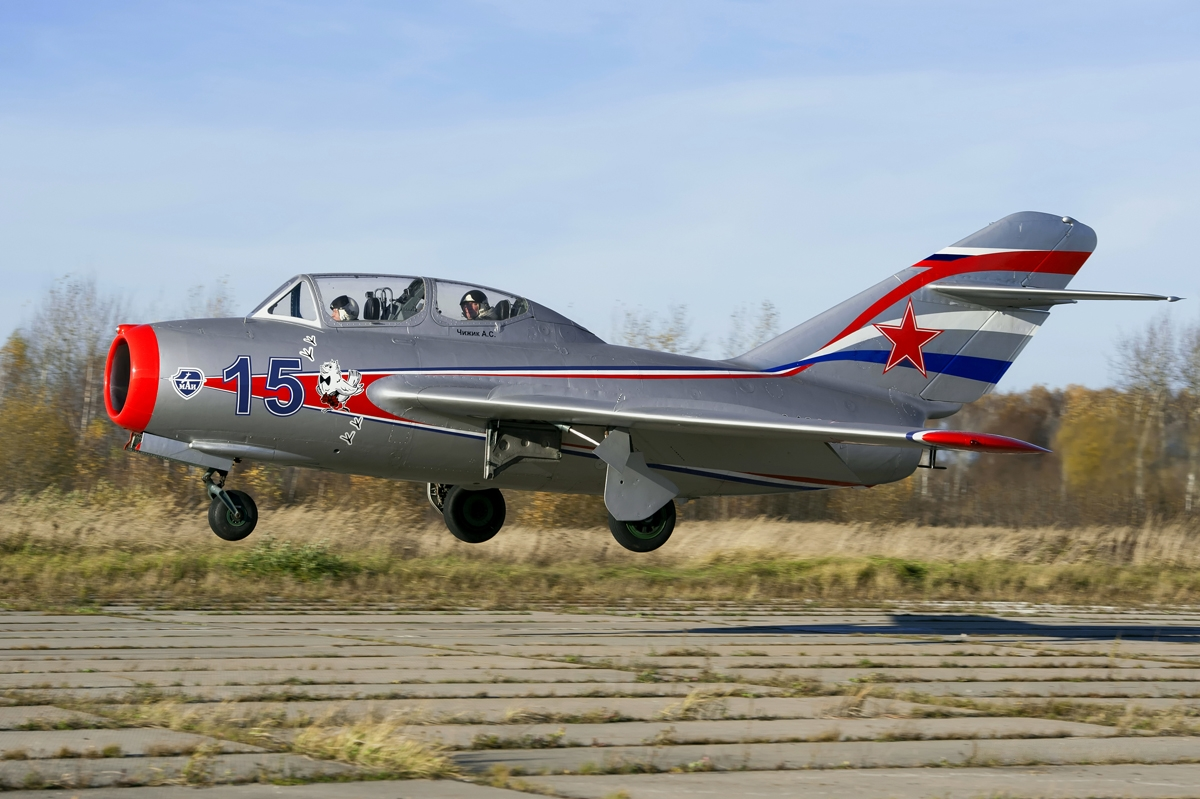
A MiG-15UTI, the same type as Gagarin was flying when he died

Alexei Leonov, who was also a member of a state commission established to investigate Gagarin's death, was conducting parachute training sessions that day and heard "two loud booms in the distance". He believes that a Sukhoi Su-15 was flying below its minimum altitude and, "without realizing it because of the terrible weather conditions, he passed within 10 or 20 meters (33 or 66 ft) of Yuri and Seregin's plane while breaking the sound barrier". The resulting turbulence would have sent the MiG-15UTI into an uncontrolled spin. Leonov said the first boom he heard was that of the jet breaking the sound barrier and the second was Gagarin's plane crashing.

== Awards and honours ==
=== Medals and orders of merit ===
On 14 April 1961, Gagarin was honoured with a 12-mile (19 km) parade attended by millions of people that concluded at the Red Square. After a short speech, he was bestowed the Hero of the Soviet Union, Order of Lenin, Merited Master of Sports of the Soviet Union , and the first Pilot-Cosmonaut of the USSR. On 15 April, the Soviet Academy of Sciences awarded him the Konstantin Tsiolkovsky Gold Medal, named after the Russian pioneer of space aeronautics. Gagarin had also been awarded four Soviet commemorative medals over the course of his career.

He was honoured as a Hero of Socialist Labour from Czechoslovakia on 29 April 1961, and Hero of Socialist Labour (Bulgaria, including the Order of Georgi Dimitrov) the same year. On the eighth anniversary of the beginning of the Cuban Revolution (26 July), President Osvaldo Dorticos of Cuba presented him with the first Order of Playa Girón, a newly created medal.

Gagarin was also awarded the 1960 Gold Air Medal and the 1961 De la Vaulx Medal from the Fédération Aéronautique Internationale in Switzerland. He received numerous awards from other nations that year, including the Star of the Republic of Indonesia (2nd Class), the Order of the Cross of Grunwald (1st Degree) in Poland, the Order of the Flag of the People's Republic of Hungary (1st Class with diamonds), the Hero of Labour award from the Democratic Republic of Vietnam, the Italian Columbus Day Medal, and a Gold Medal from the British Interplanetary Society along with another medal from the British Union of Foundry Workers. President Jânio Quadros of Brazil decorated Gagarin on 2 August 1961 with the Order of Aeronautical Merit, Commander grade. During a tour of Egypt in late January 1962, Gagarin received the Order of the Nile and the golden keys to the gates of Cairo. On 22 October 1963, Gagarin and Valentina Tereshkova were honoured with the Order of Karl Marx from the German Democratic Republic.

=== Tributes ===
The date of Gagarin's space flight, 12 April, has been commemorated. Since 1962, it has been celebrated first in the USSR and since 1991 in Russia and some other former Soviet republics as Cosmonautics Day. Since 2000, Yuri's Night, an international celebration, has been held annually to commemorate milestones in space exploration. In 2011, it was declared the International Day of Human Space Flight by the United Nations.

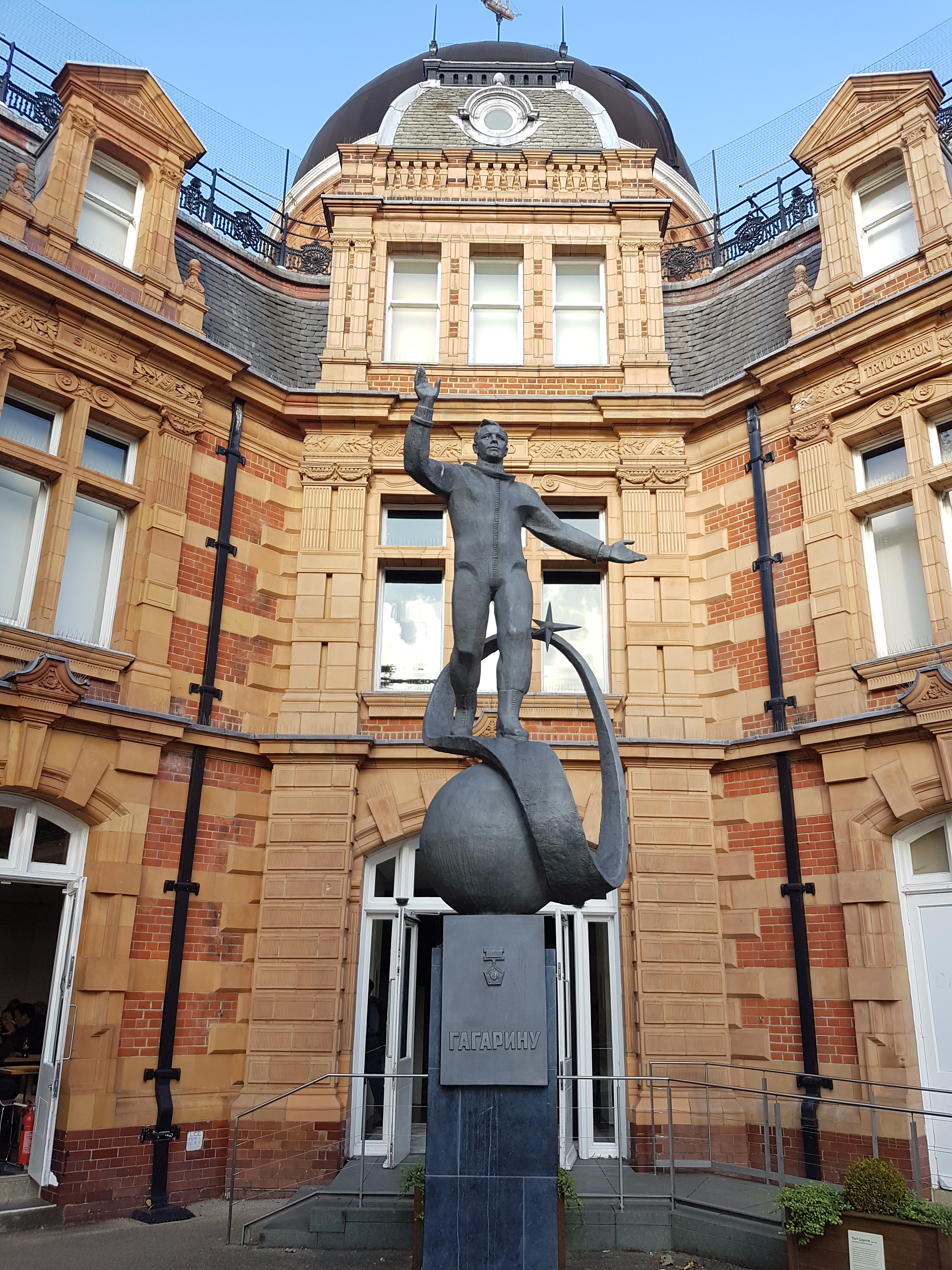
Yuri Gagarin statue at the Royal Greenwich Observatory in London, England

A number of buildings and locations have been named for Gagarin, mostly in Russia but also in other Soviet republics. The Yuri Gagarin Cosmonaut Training Center in Star City was named on 30 April 1968. The launch pad at Baikonur Cosmodrome from which Sputnik 1 and Vostok 1 were launched is now known as Gagarin's Start. Gagarin Raion in Sevastopol was named after him during the period of the Soviet Union. The Russian Air Force Academy was renamed the Gagarin Air Force Academy in 1968. The town of Gzhatsk where he lived in Smolensk Oblast was renamed Gagarin after he died in 1968, and has since become home to numerous museums and monuments to him. A street in Warsaw, Poland, is called Yuri Gagarin Street. The town of Gagarin, Armenia was renamed in his honour in 1961.

Gagarin has been honoured on the Moon by astronauts and astronomers. During the American space programme's Apollo 11 mission in 1969, astronauts Neil Armstrong and Buzz Aldrin left a memorial satchel containing medals commemorating Gagarin and Komarov on the Moon's surface. In 1971, Apollo 15 astronauts David Scott and James Irwin left the small Fallen Astronaut sculpture at their landing site as a memorial to the American astronauts and Soviet cosmonauts who died in the Space Race; the names on its plaque included Yuri Gagarin and 14 others. In 1970, a 262 km (163-mile) wide crater on the far side was named after him. Gagarin was inducted as a member of the 1976 inaugural class of the International Space Hall of Fame in New Mexico.

Gagarin is memorialised in music; a cycle of Soviet patriotic songs titled Gagarin's Constellation (Созвездье Гагарина, Sozvezdie Gagarina) was written by Aleksandra Pakhmutova and Nikolai Dobronravov in 1970–1971. The most famous of these songs refers to Gagarin's poyekhali!: in the lyrics, "He said 'let's go!' He waved his hand". He was the inspiration for the pieces "Hey Gagarin" by Jean-Michel Jarre on Métamorphoses, "Gagarin" by Public Service Broadcasting, and "Gagarin, I loved you" by Undervud.

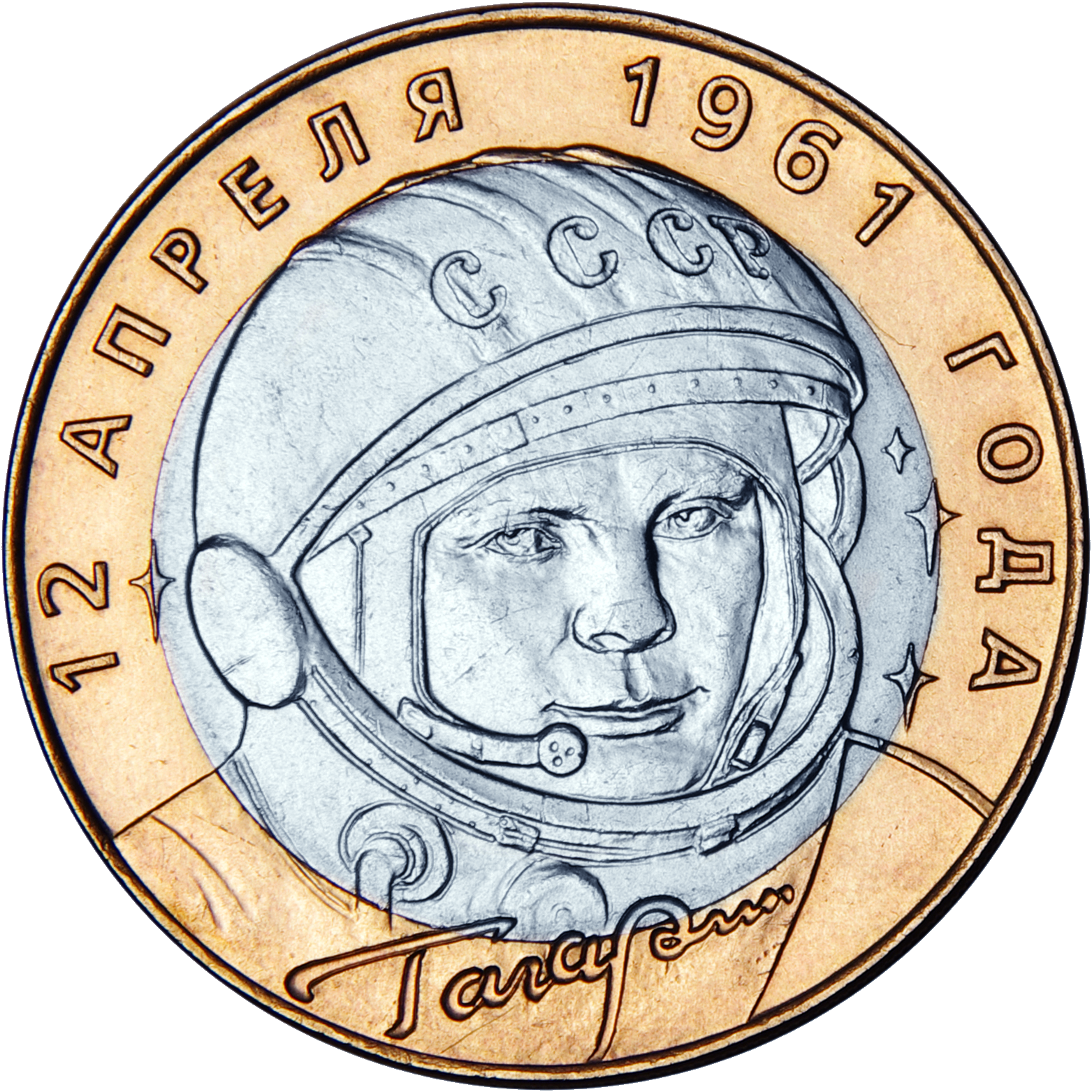
Russian ten-rouble coin commemorating Gagarin in 2001

Vessels have been named for Gagarin; Soviet tracking ship Kosmonavt Yuriy Gagarin was built in 1971 and the Armenian airline Armavia named their first Sukhoi Superjet 100 in his honour in 2011.

Two commemorative coins were issued in the Soviet Union to honour the 20th and 30th anniversaries of his flight: a one-rouble coin in copper-nickel (1981) and a three-rouble coin in silver (1991). In 2001, to commemorate the 40th anniversary of Gagarin's flight, a series of four coins bearing his likeness was issued in Russia; it consisted of a two-rouble coin in copper-nickel, a three-rouble coin in silver, a ten-rouble coin in brass-copper and nickel, and a 100-rouble coin in silver. In 2011, Russia issued a 1,000-rouble coin in gold and a three-rouble coin in silver to mark the 50th anniversary of his flight.

In 2008, the Russia-based Kontinental Hockey League named their championship trophy the Gagarin Cup. In a 2010 Space Foundation survey, Gagarin was ranked as the sixth-most-popular space hero, tied with the fictional character James T. Kirk from Star Trek. A Russian docudrama titled Gagarin: First in Space was released in 2013. Previous attempts at portraying Gagarin were disallowed; his family took legal action over his portrayal in a fictional drama and vetoed a musical.

=== Statues, monuments and murals ===
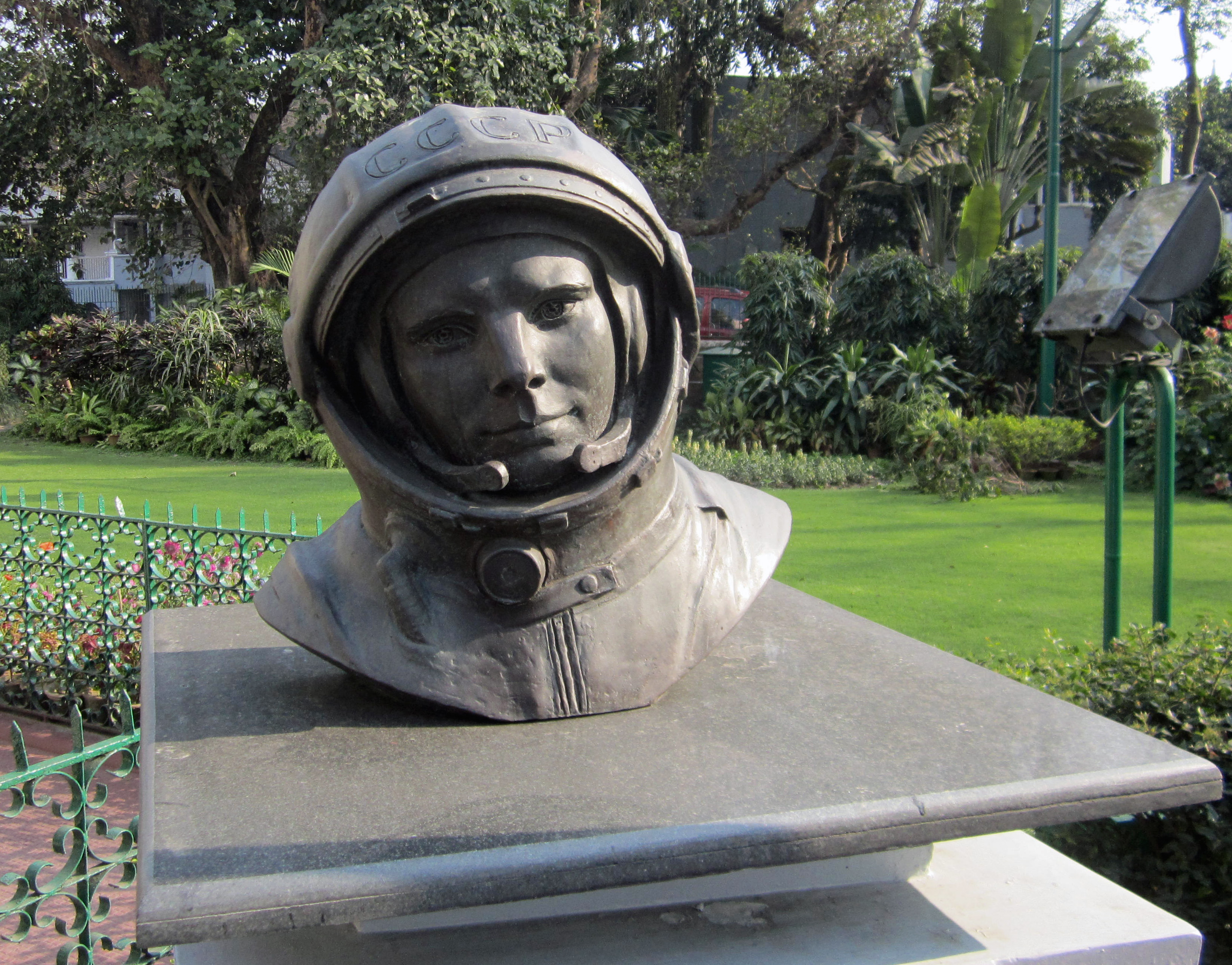
Bust of Gagarin at Birla Planetarium in Kolkata, India

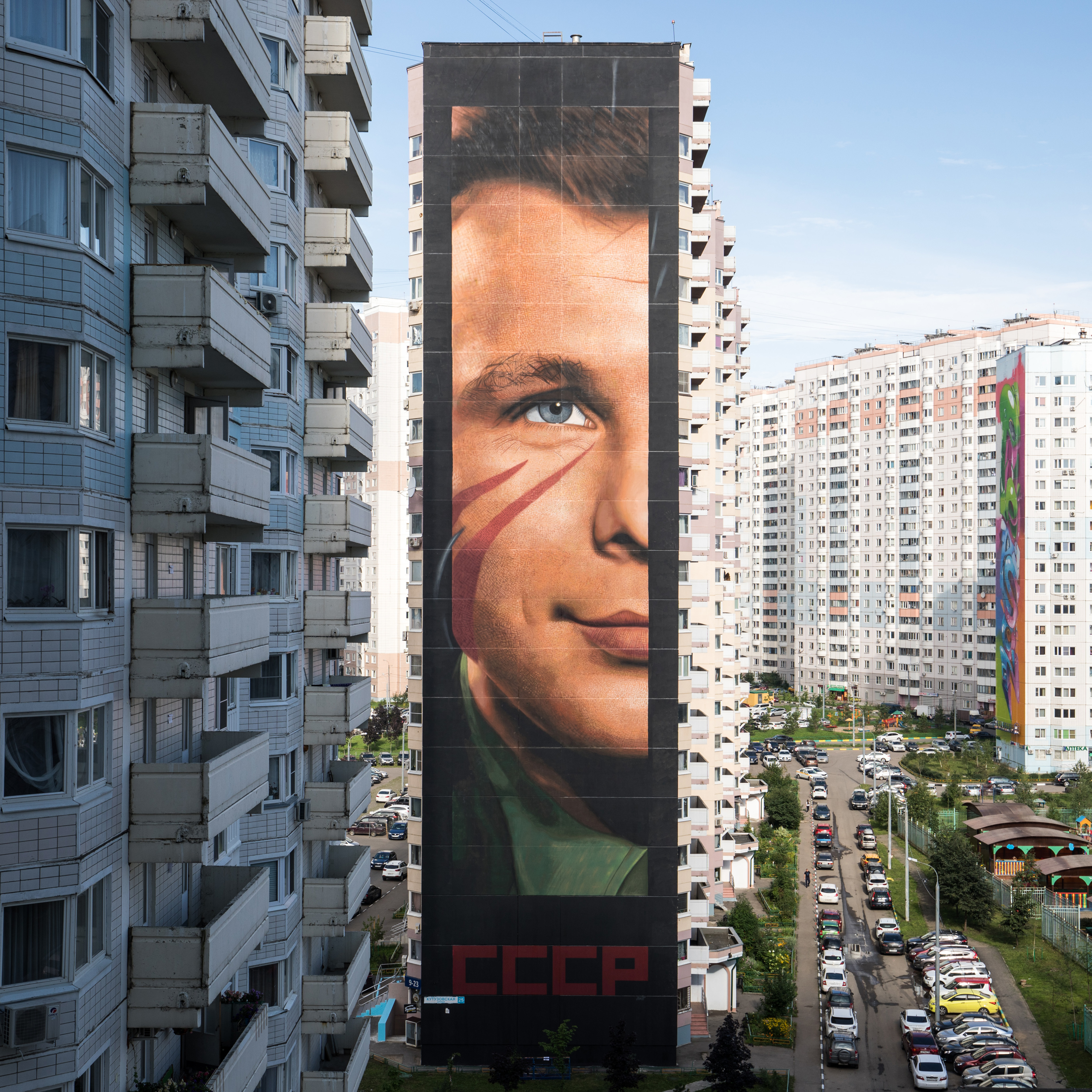
Mural of Gagarin by Jorit in Odintsovo, Russia

There are statues of Gagarin and monuments to him located in the town named after him as well as in Orenburg, Cheboksary, Irkutsk, Izhevsk, Komsomolsk-on-Amur, and Yoshkar-Ola in Russia, as well as in Zagreb and Pula, Croatia, Nicosia, Cyprus, Druzhkivka, Ukraine, Karaganda, Kazakhstan, and Tiraspol, in the breakaway state of Transnistria. On 4 June 1980, the Monument to Yuri Gagarin in Gagarin Square, Leninsky Avenue, Moscow, was opened. The monument is mounted on a 38 m (125 ft) tall pedestal and is constructed of titanium. Beside the column is a replica of the descent module used during his spaceflight.

In 2011, a statue of Gagarin was unveiled at Admiralty Arch in The Mall in London, opposite the permanent sculpture of James Cook. It is a copy of the statue outside Gagarin's former school in Lyubertsy. In 2013, the statue was moved to a permanent location outside the Royal Observatory, Greenwich.

In 2012, a statue was unveiled at the site of NASA's original spaceflight headquarters on South Wayside Drive in Houston. The sculpture was completed in 2011 by Leonov, who is also an artist, and was a gift to Houston commissioned by various Russian organisations. Houston Mayor Annise Parker, NASA Administrator Charles Bolden, and Russian Ambassador Sergey Kislyak were present for the dedication. The Russian Federation presented a bust of Gagarin to several cities in India including one that was unveiled at the Birla Planetarium in Kolkata in February 2012.

In April 2018, a bust of Gagarin erected on the street in Belgrade, Serbia, that bears his name was removed, after less than a week. A new work was commissioned following the outcry over the disproportionately small size of its head which locals said was an "insult" to Gagarin. Belgrade City Manager Goran Vesic stated that neither the city, the Serbian Ministry of Culture, nor the foundation that financed it had prior knowledge of the design.

In August 2019, the Italian artist Jorit painted Gagarin's face on the facade of a twenty-storey building in the district of Odintsovo, Russia. The mural is the largest portrait of Gagarin in the world.

In March 2021, a statue of Gagarin was unveiled at Mataram Park (Taman Mataram) in Jakarta, Indonesia in celebration of the 70th anniversary of Indonesia–Russia diplomatic relations as well as the 60th anniversary of the first human space flight. The statue, sculpted by Russian artist A.D. Leonov and presented by the Russian embassy in Jakarta, is considered "a sign of strengthening relations" between Moscow and Jakarta, which have been sister cities since 2006.

In November 2025, a monument to Gagarin was unveiled in Islamabad's Fatima Jinnah Park, marking a new cultural exchange initiative between Russia and Pakistan. The ceremony coincided with the 10th meeting of the Russia–Pakistan Intergovernmental Commission on Trade, Economic, Scientific and Technical Cooperation. The bust, provided by the International Charitable Fund "Dialogue of Cultures–United World" with support from the St. Petersburg International Mercantile Exchange, was presented as a symbol of bilateral cooperation.

=== 50th anniversary ===
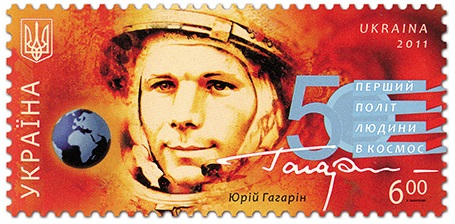
Ukrainian stamp in honour of the 50th anniversary of the first human spaceflight (2011)

The 50th anniversary of Gagarin's journey into space was marked in 2011 by tributes around the world. A documentary film titled First Orbit was shot from the International Space Station, combining sound recordings from the original flight with footage of the route taken by Gagarin. The Russian, American, and Italian crew of Expedition 27 aboard the ISS sent a special video message to wish the people of the world a "Happy Yuri's Night", wearing shirts with an image of Gagarin.

The Central Bank of the Russian Federation released gold and silver coins to commemorate the anniversary. The Soyuz TMA-21 spacecraft was named Gagarin with the launch in April 2011 to coincide with the 50th anniversary of his mission.

== Notes ==
Preceded by Joseph A. Walker	Human altitude record 1961–1964	Succeeded by Voskhod 1 crew
