= Klushino =

Village in Smolensk Oblast, Russia

Klushino Клушино
- City
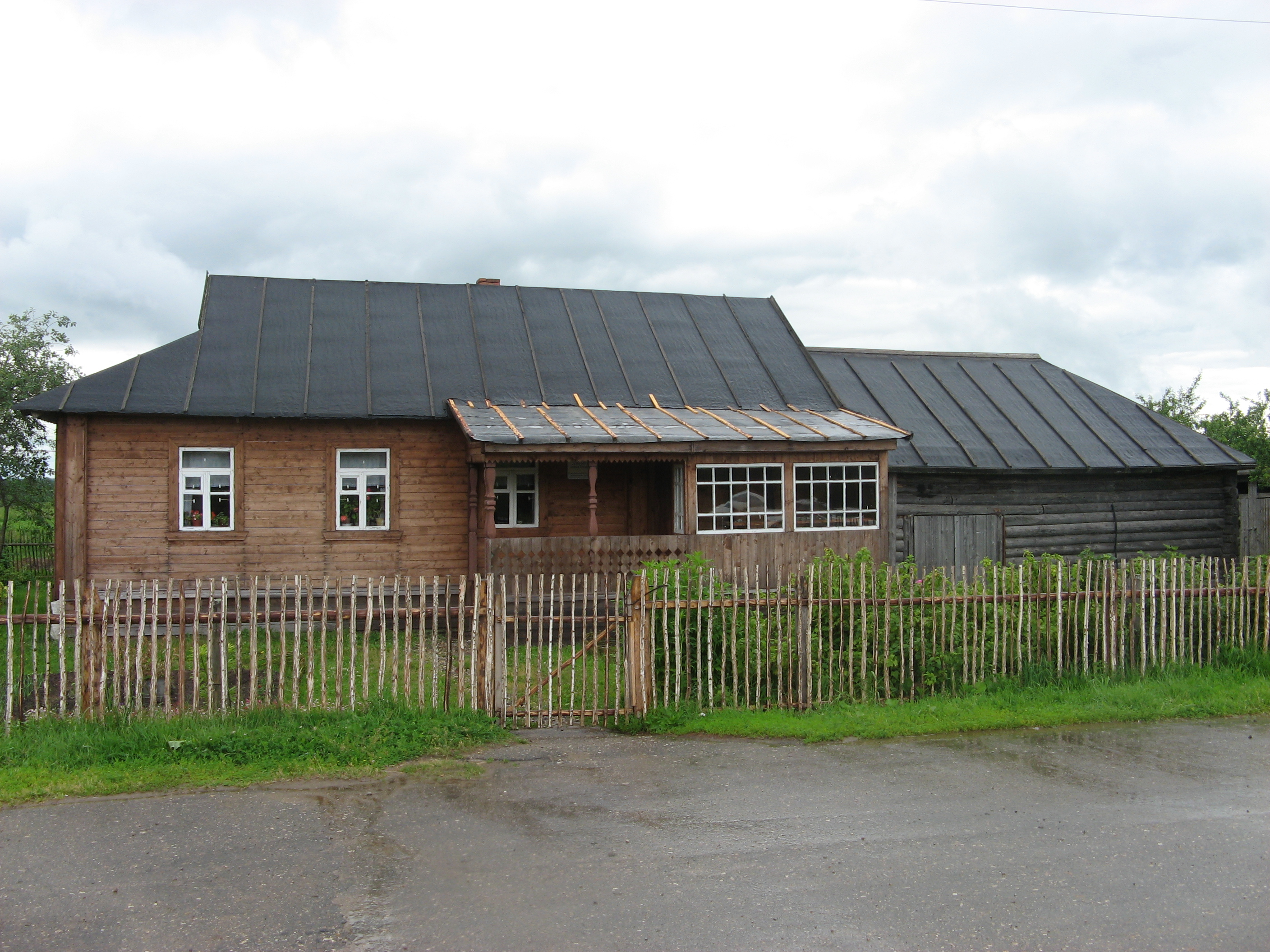
- The Yuri Gagarin Museum in Klushino

- Location within Smolensk Oblast Location within Russia
- Coordinates: 55°40′15″N 35°3′12″E
- Country: Russia
- Federal subject: Smolensk Oblast
- District: Gagarinsky

Area
  - Total: 1.4 km^{2} (0.54 sq mi)

Population (2010)
  - Total: 403
  - Density: 290/km^{2} (750/sq mi)
- Time zone: UTC+3 (MSK)

Klushino (Russian: Клушино, IPA: [ˈkluʂɨnə]) is a village in Smolensk Oblast (Western Oblast before 1937), Russia. It is situated on the old road between Vyazma and Mozhaysk, not far from Gzhatsk (now named Gagarin), and it was the site of a major battle during the Polish–Russian War of 1609–1618.

The village is best known as the birthplace of Yuri Gagarin, the first man in space, born there in March 9 1934. Gagarin's original house in Klushino was deconstructed and rebuilt in Gzhatsk by his father when his family moved. A replica of the Gagarin house was built in Klushino in 1971, and is now a museum.
