= Chkalovsky (air base) =

Military air base in Moscow Oblast, Russia

Chkalovsky Чкаловский
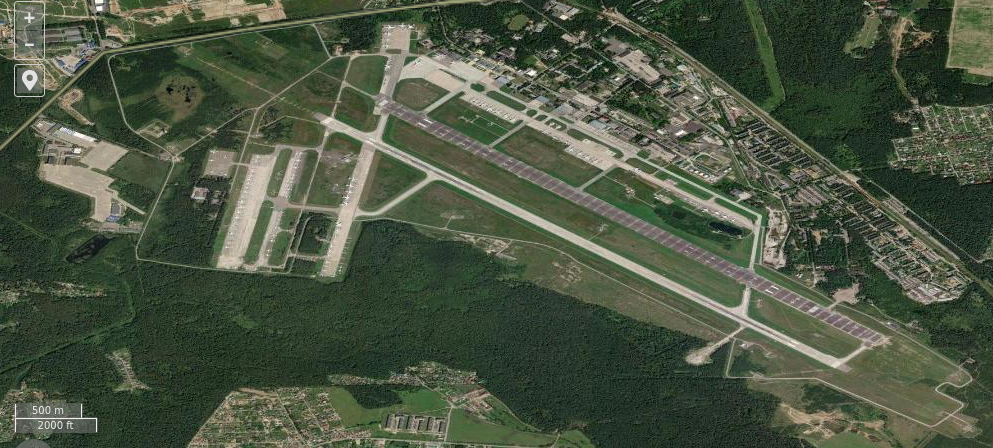
- Satellite imagery of Chkalovsky air base

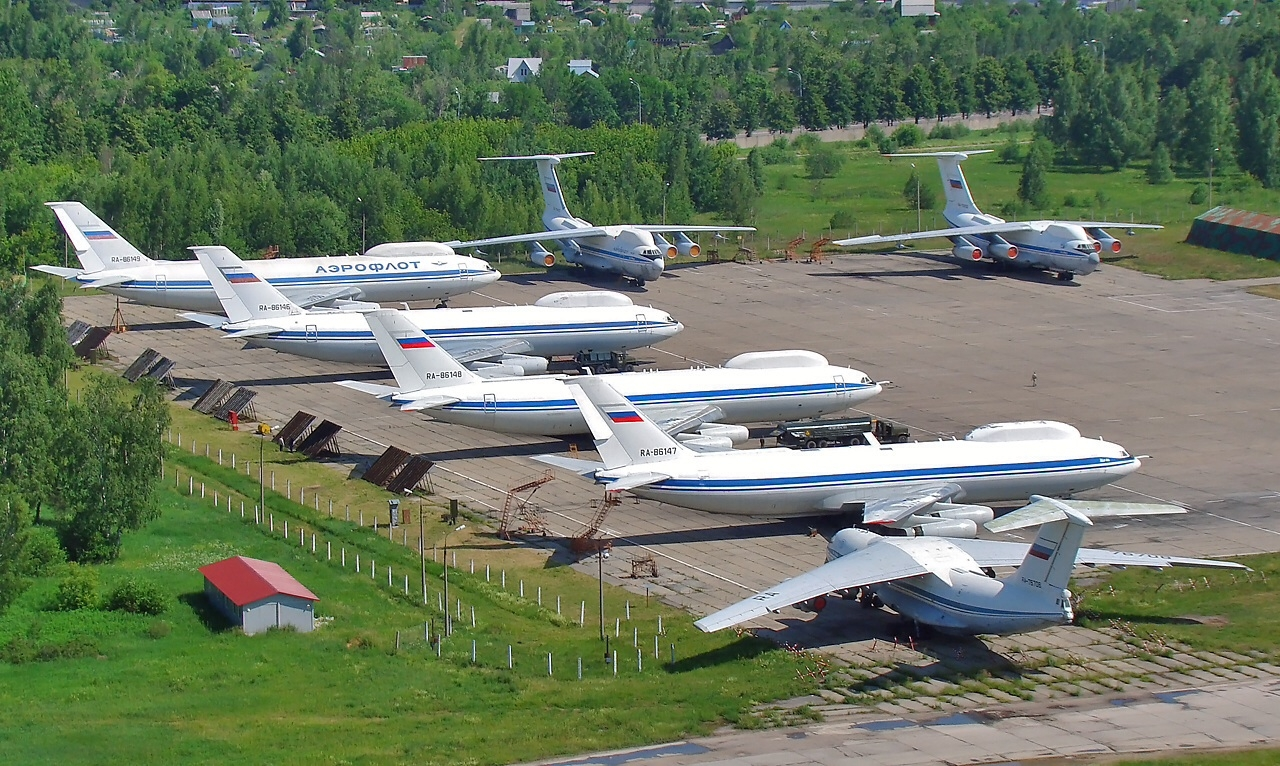
- IATA: CKL; ICAO: UUMU

Summary
- Airport type: Military
- Owner/Operator: Russian Aerospace Forces
- Serves: Moscow
- Elevation AMSL: 499 ft (152 m)
- Coordinates: 55°52′42″N 38°03′42″E

Map
- Location relative to Moscow

Runways
| Direction | Length | | Surface |
| Direction | m | ft | Surface |
|---|---|---|---|
| 12R/30L | 3,000 | 9,842 | Concrete |
- Source: Aviapages.ru

Chkalovsky (IATA: CKL, ICAO: UUMU) is a military air base near Shchyolkovo, Moscow Oblast, Russia. It is located 31 km northeast of Moscow.

The airport name is also given as Chkalovskoye. The facility should not be confused with Kaliningrad Chkalovsk or Omsk Chkalovsk airfields.

== History ==
In 1929, a decision was made to create a new flight test base of Soviet significance near Moscow. The largest runway of reinforced concrete slabs in the Union of Soviet Socialist Republics was built here. wind tunnels, hypobaric chambers, special scales for weighing aircraft, a research plant and other scientific and testing facilities were also built. A little later, a launch slide was built here (the first prototype of a springboard take-off runway for aircraft carriers), which was popularly called "Chkalovskaya". It was needed for the launch of heavy aircraft, primarily of the experimental ANT-25 (RD).

In 1932-35, the state flight testing institute was relocated here from Khodynka, the Central Airfield. A reorganisation in December 1960 saw most testing arrangements moved to Akhtubinsk in Astrakhan Oblast.

After the German Operation Barbarossa invasion began in 1941, three fighter aviation regiments (401, 402, 403), two dive bomber regiments (410, 411), two heavy bomber regiments (420, 421), an assault regiment (430), a reconnaissance squadron, as well as three airfield service battalions (760,761,762) were formed at Chkalovsky.

The base provides air support for Star City, Yuri Gagarin Cosmonauts Training Center, and other elements of the Soviet space program and Russian Federal Space Agency. It is also a major transport base, with the 8th Special Purpose Aviation Division (since 2009–10, the 6991st Air Base) operating the Antonov An-12, Antonov An-72, Tupolev Tu-154, Ilyushin Il-76, and Il-86VKP. Chkalovsky received USSR's first Il-76K for cosmonaut training on 23 July 1977.

== Accidents and incidents ==
On 14 January 1966, the second prototype Tu-134 (CCCP-45076) crashed near the base during trials with the NII VVS after entering a dive following a turn, killing all eight on board. This was the first fatal crash of a Tupolev Tu-134 and also the first hull loss of the aircraft.

On 27 March 1968, while on a routine training flight from the base, Yuri Gagarin and flight instructor Vladimir Seryogin died when their MiG-15UTI crashed near the town of Kirzhach. The bodies of Gagarin and Seryogin were cremated and their ashes interred in the walls of the Kremlin. Wrapped in secrecy, the cause of the crash that killed Gagarin is uncertain and became the subject of several theories, including several conspiracy theories.

On 18 September 2023, the Ukrainian military intelligence claimed that they had raided Chkalovsky Air Base. According to them, the raid damaged or destroyed an An-148, an Ilyushin Il-20, and a Mil Mi-28 helicopter.

== See also ==
- List of military airbases in Russia
