= Vladimir Seryogin =

Soviet test pilot

Colonel Vladimir Sergeyevich Seryogin
- Владимир Сергеевич Серёгин
- Seryogin c. 1960s
- Born: 7 July 1922; Moscow, Soviet Union
- Died: 27 March 1968 (aged 45); Kirzhach, Kirzhachsky District, Vladimir Oblast, Russian SFSR, Soviet Union
- Cause of death: MiG-15 jet crash
- Resting place: Kremlin Wall Necropolis, Moscow
- Occupation: Test pilot
- Awards: Hero of the Soviet Union
- Aviation career
- Battles: World War II
- Rank: Polkovnik (equiv. Colonel), Soviet Air Force

Vladimir Sergeyevich Seryogin (Russian: Владимир Сергеевич Серёгин; 7 July 1922 – 27 March 1968) was a Soviet test pilot.

== Military Service ==
Vladimir Seryogin became a volunteer of the Red Army after grammar school. His flying abilities recognized, he was directed to piloting. His performance on the Eastern Front of the Second World War resulted in his being awarded several medals including the title Hero of the Soviet Union.

After conclusion of the war, Seryogin remained in the Soviet Air Force. After completing an engineering course, he went on to work as a test pilot for the Soviet Air Force Test Institute. In addition, Seryogin was the commanding officer of the Cosmonauts' Flight Preparation organization.

== Death ==
On 27 March 1968, while on a routine training flight from Chkalovsky Air Base with his colleague and friend Yuri Gagarin—the first human ever to have flown in space—the MiG-15UTI they were piloting crashed near the town of Kirzhach. Both pilots were killed in the crash; their bodies were subsequently cremated and the ashes were buried in the walls of the Kremlin on Red Square.
