= Piers Bizony =

British journalist

- Born: 12. February 1959
- Occupations: Author, journalist
- Writing career
- Genre: Non-fiction

Piers Bizony is a science journalist, space historian, author, and exhibition organiser. Bizony specialises in the topics of outer space, special effects, and technology. He has written articles for The Independent, BBC Focus and Wired. His 1997 book The Rivers of Mars was shortlisted for the Eugene M. Emme Astronautical Literature Award. His book 2001: Filming the Future (1994, revised 2000, expanded 2014) is an authoritative reference about Stanley Kubrick's film 2001: A Space Odyssey. His 2017 book Moonshots was inspired by Michael Light's 1999 book Full Moon.

== Publications ==
- Bizony, Piers (1994). 2001: Filming the Future (163-page 1st ed.). Aurum Press. ISBN 1-85410-365-2.
- Bizony, Piers (1996). Island in the Sky: The International Space Station. Aurum Press. ISBN 978-1-85410-436-6.
- Bizony, Piers (1997). The Rivers of Mars: Searching for the Cosmic Origins of Life. Aurum Press. ISBN 978-1-85410-495-3.
- Bizony, Piers (1998). The Exploration of Mars: Searching for the Cosmic Origins of Life. Aurum Press. ISBN 978-1-85410-584-4.
- Bizony, Piers (2000). 2001: Filming the Future (165-page revised 2nd ed.). Aurum Press. ISBN 978-1-85410-706-0. (Reprinted 2001, Aurum Press.)
- Bizony, Piers (2001). Digital Domain: The Leading Edge of Visual Effects. Aurum Press. ISBN 978-1-85410-707-7. (Reprinted 2001, 2002, Billboard Books.)
- Bizony, Piers (2004). Atom. Icon Books. ISBN 978-1-84046-873-1.
- Bizony, Piers (2006). The Man Who Ran the Moon: James E. Webb, NASA, and the Secret History of Project Apollo. Icon Books. ISBN 978-1-84046-764-2. (Reprinted 2006, Thunder's Mouth; 2007, Icon; 2009, Basic Books.)
- Bizony, Piers (2006). Space 50. Smithsonian. ISBN 978-0-06-089010-0.
- Bizony, Piers (2009). One Giant Leap: Apollo 11 Remembered. Zenith Press. ISBN 978-0-7603-3710-3.
- Bizony, Piers (2009). How to Build Your Own Spaceship: The Science of Personal Space Travel. Plume. ISBN 978-0-452-29533-9.
- Bizony, Piers (2010). Science: The Definitive Guide. Sterling Publishing. ISBN 978-1-4351-2948-1.
- Bizony, Piers (2011). The Space Shuttle: Celebrating Thirty Years of NASA's First Space Plane. Zenith Press. ISBN 978-0-7603-3941-1.
- Bizony, Piers (2011). Cosmic Tour: 1001 Must-See Images from Across the Universe. Quercus. ISBN 978-0-85738-341-9.
- Bizony, Piers (2012). The Search for Aliens: A Rough Guide to Life on Other Worlds. Rough Guides. ISBN 978-1-4053-8324-0.
- Bizony, Piers (2014). The Making of Stanley Kubrick's 2001: A Space Odyssey (1386-page collector ed.). Taschen. ISBN 978-3-8365-4769-7. — Contains 5 items: 2001: Filming the Future (562-page expanded 3rd ed.), plus 2001: A Space Odyssey [Photos] (100 film stills, 208 p.), 2001: A Space Odyssey Script (facsimile of Kubrick's annotated copy of Clarke's prose treatment "Journey Beyond the Stars: A Film Story", 260 p.), 2001: A Space Odyssey Notes (facsimile of 158 production notes compiled by Victor Lyndon, 320 p.), and 201 Min. of a Space Idiocy (reprint from Mad magazine no. 125, 8 p.). 1500 copies.
- Bizony, Piers (2015). The Making of Stanley Kubrick's 2001: A Space Odyssey (562-page regular ed.). Taschen. ISBN 978-3-8365-5954-6. — Contains 1 item: 2001: Filming the Future (562-page expanded 3rd ed.).
- Bizony, Piers (2017). Moonshots (240-page slipcase ed.). Voyageur Press. ISBN 978-0-7603-5262-5.
