= Anatoly Kartashov (cosmonaut) =

Soviet astronaut (1932–2005)

Anatoly Kartashov Анатолий Карташов
- Born: 25 August 1932; Voronezh Oblast, RSFSR, USSR
- Died: 11 December 2005 (aged 73); Kiev, Ukraine
- Military career
- Allegiance: Soviet Union
- Branch: Soviet Air Force
- Service years: 1952–1985
- Rank: Colonel
- Awards: Order of the Red Star

Anatoly Yakovlevich Kartashov (Russian: Анато́лий Я́ковлевич Карташо́в; 25 August 1932 – 11 December 2005) was a cosmonaut in the Soviet Vostok program.

== Early life and personal life ==
Anatoly Yakovlevich Kartashov was born to Yerfrosinya Timofeyevna and Yakov Prokofyevich Kartashov on August 25, 1932. Kartashov was born in the village of Pervoye Sadovoye in the Sadovoye district. He married and had two daughters with Yuliya Sergeyevna. Kartashov's first daughter Ludmila was born in 1960 and his second daughter Svetlana was born in 1967.

== Education and career ==
Kartashov would be unable to complete his secondary education until 1948 due to the war conflict in their region. Following the completion of his secondary schooling he studied at Voronezh Aviation College. Kartashov completed his education at Voronezh Aviation College in 1952 and was subsequently called into the military. He continued his education at Chuguyev Higher Air Force School and in 1954 achieved the rank of lieutenant. In the same year Kartashov would go on to become a fighter pilot. On February 19, 1957 Kartashov was awarded the rank of senior lieutenant and earned the position as chief pilot within the 722nd Fighter Aviation Regiment. He was also a parachuting instructor and logged the most jumps for any of the first men who were selected as cosmonauts.

Anatoly Kartashov, though qualified, was never selected to go into space for health reasons. Kartashov had initially been trained to be selected as a cosmonaut to go in one of the Vostok missions. It is reported that Yuri Gagarin, one of the men who would be selected for a Vostok mission, thought that Kartashov was one of the best men in training.
