= Ukraine's 8th electoral district =

Ukrainian electoral district

- Electoral district for the Verkhovna Rada
- Region: Autonomous Republic of Crimea
- Population: 145,241

Current Electoral district
- Created: 2012
Party
Vacant

Ukraine's 8th electoral district is a Verkhovna Rada constituency in the Autonomous Republic of Crimea. Established in its current form in 2012, it includes the town of Sudak, as well as Bilohirsk Raion, Nyzhniohirskyi Raion, Sovietskyi Raion, and parts of Simferopol Raion. The constituency is home to 145,241 registered voters, and has 154 polling stations. Since the Annexation of Crimea by the Russian Federation in 2014, the seat has been vacant.

The constituency is surrounded by the 6th district to the east, the 3rd district to the north, the 2nd and 10th districts to the southwest, and the 7th district to the south. It has two coastlines, on the Sea of Azov in the south and on the Syvash in the northeast.

== People's Deputies ==
Party	Member	Portrait	Election
Party of Regions	Boris Deich		2012
Vacant			2014
Vacant			2019

== Elections ==
=== 2012 ===
2012 Ukrainian parliamentary election
Party	Candidate	Votes	%
Party of Regions	Borys Deych	46,734	62.4%
Batkivshchyna	Eskender Bariyev	11,882	15.9%
KPU	Roksolana Ivashyna	6,072	8.1%
UDAR	Vitaliy Khomutov	3,249	4.3%
Ukraine – Forward!	Edem Nimetullayev	1,546	2.1%
Green Planet	Serhiy Ponomarenko	771	1.0%
New Politics	Halyna Melnyk	761	1.0%
Chernobyl Union	Olena Kaseyeva	699	0.9%
Soyuz	Stanislav Kryzhanovsky	613	0.8%
Aktsent	Nina Bytkova	612	0.8%
Others		2,835	4.0%
Total votes		75,774	100.0%
Party of Regions win (new seat)			

== See also ==
- Electoral districts of Ukraine
- Foreign electoral district of Ukraine
