= Ukraine's 10th electoral district =

Ukrainian electoral district

Coordinates: 44°45′10″N 33°51′39″E

- Electoral district for the Verkhovna Rada
- Region: Autonomous Republic of Crimea
- Population: 159,391

Current Electoral district
- Created: 2012
Party
Vacant

Ukraine's 10th electoral district is a Verkhovna Rada constituency in the Autonomous Republic of Crimea. Established in its current form in 2012, it contains the city of Bakhchysarai, as well as Bakhchysarai Raion and parts of Simferopol Raion. The constituency was home to 159,391 registered voters in 2012, and has 130 voting stations. Since the Annexation of Crimea by the Russian Federation in 2014, the seat has been vacant.

The constituency is bordered by the 4th and 3rd electoral districts to the north, the 1st, 2nd, and 8th districts to the west, the 7th and 224th districts to the south, and the 225th district and Kalamita Bay to the east.

== People's Deputies ==
Party	Member	Portrait	Election
Party of Regions	Hryhorii Hruba		2012
Vacant			2014
Vacant			2019

== Elections ==
=== 2012 ===
2012 Ukrainian parliamentary election
Party	Candidate	Votes	%
Party of Regions	Hryhory Hruba	30,671	41.6%
Independent	Ahtem Chiygoz	14,427	19.6%
KPU	Mykhailo Holubev	7,710	10.5%
One Rus	Oleksiy Remeniuk	3,799	5.2%
UDAR	Dmytro Vakulin	3,755	5.1%
Russian Unity	Mykhailo Makeyev	1,682	2.3%
Soyuz	Volodymyr Tuterov	1,546	2.1%
Independent	Oleksandr Yuryev	1,544	2.1%
Independent	Kostiantyn Knyrik	943	1.3%
Green Planet	Olena Tereshchenko	907	1.2%
Independent	Volodymyr Kazarin	831	1.1%
Others		5,444	8.0%
Total votes		72,428	100.0%
Party of Regions win (new seat)			

== See also ==
- Electoral districts of Ukraine
- Foreign electoral district of Ukraine
