= Ukraine's 224th electoral district =

Ukrainian electoral district

Coordinates: 44°35′43″N 33°27′8″E

- Electoral district for the Verkhovna Rada
- Region: Sevastopol
- Electorate: 152,498 (2013)
- Major settlements: Gagarinskiy District, Leninskiy District (part), Balaklava District

Current Electoral district
- Created: 2012
Party
Vacant

Ukraine's 224th electoral district is a Verkhovna Rada constituency in the city of Sevastopol. Established in its current form in 2012, it contains the southern half of Sevastopol. The constituency has 95 polling stations. The district is bordered by the 225th electoral district to the north, the 10th electoral district to the north-east, the 7th electoral district to the east, and the Black Sea to the south and west.

Since 2014, the district has been under Russian control following the annexation of Sevastopol. As a result, elections under Ukrainian law have not been held, and the district has remained unrepresented in the Verkhovna Rada of Ukraine since. Under Russian legislation, the entire city of Sevastopol constitutes single-member Constituency No. 219 for elections to the State Duma.

== People's Deputies ==
Election	Party	Portrait	Member
2012	Party of Regions		Pavlo Lebedyev (Note: Resigned on 22 March 2013 to become Minister of Defence of Ukraine.)
2013 (Note: A by-election was held on 7 July 2013 to fill the vacancy.)	Party of Regions (Note: Although contested the seat as Independent, joined the Party of Regions fraction in Verkhovna Rada.)		Vadym Novynskyi
2014	Vacant		
2019	Vacant		

== Elections ==
=== 2013 ===
The by-election was triggered by the resignation of incumbent MP Pavlo Lebedyev, who vacated his seat on 22 March 2013 after being appointed Minister of Defence of Ukraine as both positions cannot be held simultaneously (Note: Article 78 of the Constitution of Ukraine.).

The campaign was dominated by the candidacy of businessman Vadym Novynskyi, who was widely regarded as the preferred candidate of the governing Party of Regions. The electoral environment has been described as offering limited competition, with several candidates withdrawing before polling day.

Observers reported several electoral irregularities, including procedural and campaign-related issues. However, these issues were not considered sufficient to significantly affect the final outcome.

7 July 2013 by-election
Party	Candidate	Votes	%	±%
Independent	Vadym Novynskyi	19,234	53.4	New
KPU	Vasyl Parkhomenko	11,593	32.2	▲16.1
Independent	Vasyl Zelenchuk	2,313	6.4	New
Independent	Dmytro Bilotserkovets	1,207	3.4	New
Independent	Ivan Komelov	847	2.4	New
Independent	Iryna Mielidis	202	0.6	New
Soyuz	Mykola Rybakov	184	0.5	New
Others		426	1.2	N/A
Total votes		36,006	100.0	
Rejected ballots		503	1.4	▼1.7
Turnout		36,509	23.9	▼27.1
Registered electors		152,498		
Independent gain from Party of Regions				

=== 2012 ===
2012 Ukrainian parliamentary election
Party	Candidate	Votes	%
Party of Regions	Pavlo Lebedyev	32,076	42.6
Russian Bloc	Dmitry Belik	20,911	27.8
KPU	Serhiy Bohatyrenko	12,100	16.1
Batkivshchyna	Serhiy Tiulieniev	3,233	4.3
UDAR	Mykola Rybakov	2,571	3.4
Ukraine – Forward!	Ivan Yermakov	1,249	1.7
Hromada	Serhiy Kondratevsky	1,186	1.6
Others		1,889	2.5
Total votes		75,215	100.0
Rejected ballots		2,407	3.1
Turnout		77,622	51.0
Registered electors		152,256	
Party of Regions win (new seat)			

== See also ==
- Electoral districts of Ukraine
- Foreign electoral district of Ukraine
