= Ukraine's 2nd electoral district =

Ukrainian electoral district

- Electoral district for the Verkhovna Rada
- Region: Autonomous Republic of Crimea
- Population: 150,497

Current Electoral district
- Created: 2012
Party
Vacant

Ukraine's 2nd electoral district is a Verkhovna Rada constituency in the Autonomous Republic of Crimea. Established in its current form in 2012, it includes part of the city of Simferopol and part of Simferopol Raion. The constituency is home to 150,497 registered voters and has 98 polling stations. Since the Annexation of Crimea by the Russian Federation in 2014, the seat has been vacant.

Ukraine's 2nd electoral district bordered is by the 1st and 10th districts to the west, the 7th district to the southwest and the 8th to the east and the north.

== People's Deputies ==
Party	Member	Portrait	Election
Soyuz	Lev Mirimsky		2012
Vacant			2014
Vacant			2019

== Elections ==
=== 2012 ===
2012 Ukrainian parliamentary election
Party	Candidate	Votes	%
Soyuz	Lev Myrymskyi	23,755	36.5%
KPU	Stepan Kiskin	17,683	27.1%
Batkivshchyna	Abiba Sydorova	5,753	8.8%
UDAR	Yuriy Kalyubin	3,988	6.1%
Russian Unity	Oleksandr Spiridonov	2,686	4.1%
Green Planet	Nadiya Aksonova	2,034	3.1%
One Rus	Anatoliy Lus	1,373	2.1%
Party of Greens	Yana Andryeeva	951	1.5%
Independent	Anatoliy Petrov	914	1.4%
Others		6,030	9.2%
Total votes		65,167	100.0%
Soyuz win (new seat)			

== See also ==
- Electoral districts of Ukraine
- Foreign electoral district of Ukraine
