= Ukraine's 5th electoral district =

Ukrainian electoral district

- Electoral district for the Verkhovna Rada
- Region: Autonomous Republic of Crimea
- Population: 143,545

Current Electoral district
- Created: 2012
Party
Vacant

Ukraine's 5th electoral district is a Verkhovna Rada constituency in the Autonomous Republic of Crimea. Established in its current form in 2012, it includes the city of Kerch, and the part of Lenine Raion east of the city of Lenine itself. The constituency is home to 143,545 registered voters, and has 98 polling stations. Since the Annexation of Crimea by the Russian Federation in 2014, the seat has been vacant.

== People's Deputies ==
Party	Member	Portrait	Election
Party of Regions	Valentyna Liutikova		2012
Vacant			2014
Vacant			2019

== Elections ==
=== 2012 ===
2012 Ukrainian parliamentary election
Party	Candidate	Votes	%
Party of Regions	Valentyna Lyutikova	27,551	41.8%
KPU	Ivan Zheltenko	13,011	19.7%
Batkivshchyna	Illya Sahaydak	9,566	14.5%
UDAR	Mykola Steblovsky	4,023	6.1%
Independent	Yunus Nazarov	2,755	4.2%
Independent	Myroslav Halik	1,241	1.9%
Union. Chernobyl. Ukraine.	Oleksandr Lutsyk	1,045	1.6%
Greens	Valeriya Horozhankina	994	1.5%
Independent	Yevhen Maksymenko	928	1.4%
Party of Greens	Ihor Savchenko	767	1.2%
Others		5,729	8.1%
Total votes		67,610	100.0%
Party of Regions win (new seat)			

== See also ==
- Electoral districts of Ukraine
- Foreign electoral district of Ukraine
