= One Rus =

Ukrainian political party

One Rus (Ukrainian: Русь Єдина, romanized: Rus Yedyna) is a political party in Ukraine established in 2003 that was banned by court in June 2022 and it never appealed this ban. In 2006, 2007 and 2008 the party was named Party of Putin Policy (Ukrainian: Партія політики ПУТІНА).

== History ==
The party was established in June 2003 as the Slavic People's Patriotic Union. One of the goals of the party was the "promotion of the creation of a common economic space of sovereign Slavic states." One of the founders of the party was Oleksiy Remeniuk. Remeniuk was at the time a People's Deputy of Ukraine who had left the parliamentary faction of the Yulia Tymoshenko Bloc in November 2022.

In the 2004 Ukrainian presidential elections the party supported Viktor Yanukovych.

On 8 November 2005, the party changed to the name of Party of Putin Policy. In polling by Institute of Social and Political Psychology of the National Academy of Sciences of Ukraine in May 2004 Russian president Vladimir Putin positive rating among Ukrainians was 67%. By September 2004 this number had dropped to 49%. In February 2006 this number had dropped again to 42.5%.

In the March 2006 Ukrainian parliamentary election Party of Putin Policy won 0.12% of the vote and no seats. Its greatest support was in Simferopol. In this election the party list was headed by Remeniuk.

In December 2008 the party changed to its current name One Rus. (After it had skipped participation in the 2007 Ukrainian parliamentary election.) According to a poll by WorldPublicOpinion.org published in June 2008 (then) prime minister of Russia Vladimir Putin had a trust rating of 59% in Ukraine. Research in Ukraine by Razumkov Centre in 2009 stated that 59% (of respondents) had a positive attitude towards Vladimir Putin. (Note: Vladimir Putin' posive ratings numbers in Ukraine significantly deteriorated by 2014. In April 2014 11% had a positive attitude towards Putin, and 71% of Ukrainians had a negative attitude. These numbers did not change in the following years. In 2019 8% (of Ukrainians) had a positive attitude towards Putin, and 71% had a negative attitude.)

In the 2012 Ukrainian parliamentary election, the party won no (constituency) seats; it had competed in 3 constituencies. In constituency 10 located in Bakhchysarai its candidate Remeniuk won 5.15% of the votes, in constituency 2 located in Simferopol the party won 2.10% of the votes and in constituency 4 located in Yevpatoria 0.83%. In an interview in 2012 Remeniuk claimed that "the main perspective of Ukraine is integration with the Russian Federation and Belarus".

The party did not participate in the 2014 Ukrainian parliamentary election. In April 2014, six months before the election and following the 2014 Russian annexation of Crimea, Remeniuk had moved to Crimea where he continued to be political active until he died late 2022.

On 24 June 2022 the Eighth Administrative Court of Appeal in Lviv banned the party. The party never appealed this sentence.
