= Ukraine's 225th electoral district =

Ukrainian electoral district

Coordinates: 44.57875766747008°N 33.518554897322204°E

- constituency for the Verkhovna Rada
- Region: Sevastopol
- Electorate: 150,781 (2012)
- Major settlements: Nakhimovskiy District, Leninskiy District (part)

Current constituency
- Created: 2012
- Number of members: Single People’s Deputy
Party
Vacant

Ukraine's 225th electoral district is a Verkhovna Rada district in the city of Sevastopol. Established in its current form in 2012, it contains the northern half of Sevastopol. The constituency has 98 polling stations. The district is bordered by the 224th electoral district to the south, the 10th electoral district to the north and east, and the Black Sea to the west.

The district's only elected member of parliament was Vadym Kolesnichenko of the Party of Regions, who represented it from 2012 until his resignation in 2014. He was a co-author of the 2012 Law on the Principles of State Language Policy and was associated with pro-Russian political positions.

Since 2014, the district has been under Russian control following the annexation of Sevastopol. As a result, elections under Ukrainian law have not been held, and the district has remained unrepresented in the Verkhovna Rada of Ukraine since. Under Russian legislation, the entire city of Sevastopol constitutes single-member Constituency No. 219 for elections to the State Duma.

== People's Deputies ==
Election	Party	Portrait	Member
2012	Party of Regions		Vadym Kolesnichenko (Note: Resigned his seat on 15 April 2014, stating that he no longer regarded the Verkhovna Rada as a functioning parliament. The seat had been left vacant for the remainder of the parliamentary term.)
2014	Vacant		
2019	Vacant		

== Elections ==
=== 2012 ===
2012 Ukrainian parliamentary election
Party	Candidate	Votes	%
Party of Regions	Vadym Kolesnichenko	30,381	43.0
KPU	Vasyl Parkhomenko	14,338	20.3
Independent	Vasyl Zelenchuk	8,007	11.3
Independent	Mykola Pomohalov	6,680	9.5
Batkivshchyna	Yuliia Pecheneva	2,260	3.2
UDAR	Oleksii Diemienok	1,947	2.8
Russian Bloc	Fedir Vasylchenko	1,444	2.0
Independent	Oleksandr Perminov	816	1.2
Independent	Oleksandr Khvalkov	769	1.1
Ukraine – Forward!	Olena Titova	758	1.1
Others		3,227	4.5
Total votes		70,627	100.0
Rejected ballots		2,168	3.0
Turnout		72,795	48.3
Registered electors		150,810	
Party of Regions win (new seat)			
