= Oleksiy Remeniuk =

Ukrainian entrepreneur and politician (1956–2022)

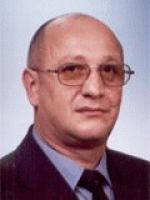
- Remeniuk in 2002

People's Deputy of Ukraine
- In office 12 May 1998 – 25 May 2006

Personal details
- Born: Oleksiy Ivanovych Remeniuk; 12 January 1956 Davydky, Zhytomyr Oblast, Ukrainian SSR, Soviet Union
- Died: 9 November 2022 (aged 66) Simferopol
- Party: Hromada; Batkivshchyna; Slavic People's Patriotic Union
- Education: Crimean Agrotechnological University
- Occupation: Entrepreneur

Oleksiy Ivanovych Remeniuk (Ukrainian: Олексій Іванович Ременюк; 12 January 1956 – 9 November 2022) was a Ukrainian politician. A member of Hromada and later Batkivshchyna, he served in the Verkhovna Rada from 1998 to 2006.

== Political career ==
In the 1998 Ukrainian parliamentary election Remeniuk was elected to the Ukrainian parliament (Verkhovna Rada) as number 17 on the party list of Hromada. In 1999 Remeniuk moved to the party Batkivshchyna, he became the party leader of its Autonomous Republic of Crimea branch.

In the 2002 Ukrainian parliamentary election Remeniuk was reelected to parliament on the election list of Yulia Tymoshenko Bloc, being number 21 on that list. He left the parliamentary faction of the Yulia Tymoshenko Bloc in November 2022.

In June 2003 Remeniuk was one of the founders of the political party Slavic People's Patriotic Union. In the 2004 Ukrainian presidential elections this party supported Viktor Yanukovych. On 8 November 2005, the party changed to the name of Party of Putin Policy.

In the 2006 Ukrainian parliamentary election Remeniuk headed the party list of Party of Putin Policy, but the party won 0.12% of the vote and no seats.

In December 2008 Party of Putin Policy changed its name to One Rus. In the 2012 Ukrainian parliamentary election its candidate Remeniuk in Ukraine's 10th electoral district won 5.15% of the votes and thus he again was not elected to parliament. In an interview in 2012 Remeniuk claimed that "the main perspective of Ukraine is integration with the Russian Federation and Belarus".

In April 2014, following the 2014 Russian annexation of Crimea, Remeniuk moved to Crimea where he continued to be political active.

== Death ==
Remeniuk died in a traffic collision in Simferopol, on 9 November 2022, at the age of 66.
