= Hryhorii Hruba =

Russian-Ukrainian politician (born 1954)

- Григорій Груба
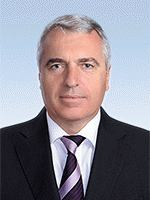
- An official photo of him from 2012.

People's Deputy of Ukraine
- In office 12 December 2012 – 27 November 2014
- Preceded by: Constituency created
- Succeeded by: Post vacant
- Constituency: Autonomous Republic of Crimea, No. 10

Personal details
- Born: Hryhorii Ivanovych Hruba; 30 March 1954 (age 72) Mhar (Lubny Raion), Ukrainian SSR, Soviet Union
- Party: Party of Regions (2012-2014)
- Education: Odesa Polytechnic National University (1977); Ukrainian Engineering Pedagogics Academy (2004); National Academy for Public Administration (2004)

Hryhorii Ivanovych Hruba (Ukrainian: Григорій Іванович Груба; Russian: Григорий Иванович Груба; born 30 March 1954) is a Russian and formerly Ukrainian politician and businessman who served as a People's Deputy of Ukraine in the Verkhovna Rada representing the 7th convocation from 2012 to its premature end in 2014 with the Party of Regions. During the 2014 Russian annexation of Crimea, he sided with Russia. Outside of politics, he was the director of Krymenergo.

== Early life ==
Hruba was born on 30 March 1954 in the village of Mhar, which was then part of the Ukrainian SSR in the Soviet Union. After graduating from secondary school, he immediately entered the workforce as a 1st-then-2nd-category electrician at the Lubny Furniture Plant from 1971 to 1972. After leaving in 1972, he decided to pursue full-time higher education, and in 1977 graduated from the Odesa Polytechnic National University in 1977 with a specialisation in the energy supply of enterprises. Afterwards, he worked as an electrical engineer for the research institute "KrymNIIproekt" in Simferopol after moving to Crimea until 1986. After 1986, Hruba transferred to being a design engineer at Krymenergo. He then steadily worked his way up there from head of the technical department to deputy chief engineer at the subsection "Krymenergonaladka" to acting chief engineer and then to chief engineer. In January 2000, he became Deputy General Director for General Affairs and External Relations, a position he held for a year until he was promoted to First Deputy General Director of Krymenergo.

In addition, later in 2004, he received two degrees: one at the Ukrainian Engineering Pedagogics Academy with a specialisation as a manager and economist, and one at the Kharkiv branch of the National Academy for Public Administration, which was a master's degree in public administration management.

== Business career ==
=== Before 2014 ===
In 2022, Hruba was selected to be CEO of Krymenergo after having worked there for a long time. By the end of 2005, around 70% of the company was owned by the Ministry of Energy, 6% by Lindsell Enterprises based in Cyprus, and 5% by VS Energy International based in the Netherlands. In March 2007, Hruba announced that Krymenergo was planning to raise a loan of 768 million hryvnias, with the European Bank for Reconstruction and Development (EBRD) lending Krymenergo $150 million USD later that month. In June, he signed another loan worth $200 million with the EBRD for a new project, and in August 2009 some of the state shares of Krymenergo were transferred to the State Property Fund to be privatised and sold. In January 2012, the state transferred the rest of the amount it owned, 45%, to the State Property Fund also. Afterwards, just before he became a deputy, in May 2012, Hruba approved the sale of all of the state shares to DTEK, owned by the oligarch Rinat Akhmetov, and it was renamed DTEK Krymenergo. He was dismissed from the directorship in December in connection with his becoming a deputy.

=== After 2014 ===
After the 2014 Russian annexation of Crimea, the now Russian State Council of Crimea decided to nationalise DTEK Krymenergo, with armed officers taking the main offices in Simferopol from DTEK. Hruba was then appointed to temporarily head the new Krymenergo. He was dismissed from the role at least by 2016, but chaired the commission for the enterprise in February 2016.

== Political career ==
Hruba first entered politics in 2002, when he served as a deputy to the Verkhovna Rada of Crimea with the Party of Regions. He was elected to represent the Chornomorske Raion. He did not run for re-election in the 2006 races, but did in 2010 and was successfullt re-elected to the Rada in Crimea until 2012, when he had to give up his mandate again.

=== 2012-2014: Verkhovna Rada ===
In 2012, Hruba announced his candidacy for the 2012 Ukrainian parliamentary elections, running within constituency No. 10 with the Party of Regions. At the time of its formation in 2012, the 10th district consisted of the city of Bakhchysarai, as well as its surrounding municipality and some parts of the Simferopol Raion. Hruba won the election to the 10th with 41.60% of the vote (30,671 people) against the self-nominated candidate Akhtem Chiygoz, who won 19.56% of the vote (14,427 people), and the Communist Party of Ukraine candidate Mykhailo Globuev, who won 10.45% of the vote (7,710 people). Upon being elected, Hruba immediately joined the Party of Regions faction and was appointed Secretary of the Committee on Fuel and Energy Complex, Nuclear Policy and Safety.

=== Russian annexation of Crimea ===
After the 2014 Russian annexation of Crimea, Hruba initially stayed silent, leaving the Party of Regions faction and joining the pro-Russian "For Peace and Stability" faction in July. However, in September 2018, alongside four other deputies, he announced his resignation from the Rada in a press conference because of the first elections in Crimea and his becoming a Russian citizen.

== Personal life ==
He is married and has a daughter named Elena. By 2014, he also had a granddaughter and a grandson.

== Honours and awards ==
Hruba has been awarded the following honours and awards:

- Order of Merit, III degree (2009)
