= Olena Netetska =

Ukrainian politician (born 1972)

- Олена Нетецька
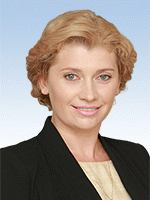
- Official portrait, 2012

People's Deputy of Ukraine
- In office 16 February 2011 – 27 November 2014
- Preceded by: Constituency established (2012)
- Succeeded by: Vacant
- Constituency: Party of Regions, No. 226 (2011); Autonomous Republic of Crimea, No. 3 (2012)
- In office 25 May 2006 – 23 November 2007
- Constituency: Party of Regions, No. 169

Personal details
- Born: 27 October 1972 (age 53) Makiivka, Ukrainian SSR, Soviet Union (now Ukraine)
- Party: Party of Regions
- Education: Donetsk National University

Olena Anatoliivna Netetska (Ukrainian: Олена Анатоліївна Нетецька; born 27 October 1972) is a Ukrainian politician. From 2006 to 2014 she was a member of the Ukrainian parliament, the Verkhovna Rada, for the Party of Regions. In her last tenure (2012 to 2014) she represented Ukraine's 3rd electoral district in the Autonomous Republic of Crimea.

== Early life and education ==
Netetska was born on 27 October 1972 in Makiivka, Donetsk Oblast. She graduated in law from the business and law faculty of the Donetsk National University.

== Employment in public administration ==
Netetska began to work in public administration during her studies. From 1992 to 1997, she was secretary and trainer in the social protection department of the city administration in Makiivka. From 1997 to 2002, she was a trainer in the organization department of the city council, and in 2002 she was appointed as head of the department. From 2003 to 2005 she was deputy chief of staff of the Donetsk Regional Administration.

== Political career ==
Netetska was elected in May 2006 in the 2006 Ukrainian parliamentary election as a member of the Verkhovna Rada (Ukraine's national parliament) for the Party of Regions. In the 2007 Ukrainian parliamentary election she was reelected for the same party. Both these elections were held according to the party-list proportional election system—that is, in a single nationwide electoral district.

Ukraine's 3rd electoral district, shown within Crimea

After the 2012 Ukrainian parliamentary election (which did have constituency seats) Netetska returned to parliament representing Ukraine's 3rd electoral district in the Autonomous Republic of Crimea as again a Party of Regions candidate. Netetska won her district with 50,37% of the vote. She was a member of parliament until 2014.
