= Ukraine's 6th electoral district =

Ukrainian electoral district

Coordinates: 45.3237°N 35.3841°E

- Electoral district for the Verkhovna Rada
- Region: Autonomous Republic of Crimea
- Population: 149,453

Current Electoral district
- Created: 2012
Party
Vacant

Ukraine's 6th electoral district is a Verkhovna Rada constituency in the Autonomous Republic of Crimea. Established in its current form in 2012, it includes Feodosia, Kirovske Raion, and the part of Lenine Raion west of the city of Lenine itself. The constituency is home to 149,453 registered voters, and has 107 polling stations. Since the Annexation of Crimea by the Russian Federation in 2014, the seat has been vacant.

== People's Deputies ==
Party	Member	Portrait	Election
Party of Regions	Yuliya Lyovochkina		2012
Vacant			2014
Vacant			2019

== Elections ==
=== 2012 ===
2012 Ukrainian parliamentary election
Party	Candidate	Votes	%
Party of Regions	Yulia Lovochkina	41,762	60.0%
KPU	Yuriy Zhadov	7,633	11.0%
Batkivshchyna	Petro Chornyi	6,041	8.7%
UDAR	Kostyantyn Kulak	2,952	4.2%
Russian Unity	Serhiy Shuvaynykov	2,863	4.1%
Independent	Almir Samadinov	1,479	2.1%
Independent	Viktor Antilohov	978	1.4%
People's	Serhiy Mokrenyuk	772	1.1%
New Politics	Andriy Verbov	710	1.0%
Aktsent	Denys Bukin	706	1.0%
Others		3,695	5.3%
Total votes		69,591	100.0%
Party of Regions win (new seat)			

== See also ==
- Electoral districts of Ukraine
- Foreign electoral district of Ukraine
