= Vadym Novynskyi =

Russian-Ukrainian businessman and politician

- Вадим Новинський
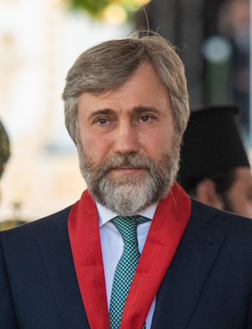
- Novynskyi in 2016

People's Deputy of Ukraine
- In office 3 September 2013 – 8 July 2022
- In office 3 September 2013 – 27 November 2014
- Preceded by: Pavlo Lebedyev
- Succeeded by: Vacant
- Constituency: 224th (Sevastopol)
- In office 27 November 2014 – 29 August 2019
- Constituency: Party list
- In office 29 August 2019 – 8 July 2022
- Preceded by: Serhiy Matviyenkov
- Succeeded by: Vacant
- Constituency: 57th (Donetsk Oblast)

Personal details
- Born: 3 June 1963 (age 63) Staraya Russa, Russian SFSR, Soviet Union
- Citizenship: Soviet Union (1963–1991); Russia (1991–2012); Ukraine (since 2012); Serbia (since 2026)
- Party: Opposition Bloc
- Other political affiliations: Party of Regions (2013–2014)
- Education: Leningrad Academy of Civil Aviation
- Occupation: Politician, businessman and priest
- Website: Official website

Vadym Vladyslavovych Novynskyi (Ukrainian: Вадим Владиславович Новинський; born 3 June 1963) is a Russian-born Ukrainian billionaire businessman, deacon and politician of Armenian descent. He is the owner of the Smart Holding Group, which has made him one of the wealthiest people in Ukraine. Novynskyi is also a protodeacon of the canonical Ukrainian Orthodox Church (UOC). He was elected to the Ukrainian Parliament in 2013, later being re-elected in 2014 and 2019. He has also represented Ukraine in the Parliamentary Assembly of the Council of Europe.

Rising in the Ukrainian metallurgical industry as a junior business partner of billionaire Rinat Akhmetov, he remained actively involved in church affairs before entering politics. He is one of the largest Ukrainian donors to his country, with his foundation having provided substantial assistance to Ukrainian medical and rehabilitation centres during the coronavirus pandemic and the Russo-Ukrainian War. Despite initially maintaining good relations with President Volodymyr Zelenskyy, the two have since fallen out, with Novynskyi leaving the country, being charged with treason and accused of aiding Russia. Novynskyi has described the charges as politically motivated.

As of July 2026, Forbes magazine estimated his net worth at US$1.2 billion. This made him one of Ukraine's six billionaires in 2026.

== Early and personal life ==
Novynskyi was born on 3 June 1963 in Staraya Russa, Soviet Russia, to an ethnically Armenian family.

In 1985, he graduated from the Leningrad Academy of Civil Aviation in engineering management systems.

Novinskyi began his career by working for various Soviet companies. At the time of the dissolution of the Soviet Union in 1991, Novinskyi resided in what became the Russian Federation, of which he automatically became a citizen, although he moved to Ukraine in 1996 and switched to Ukrainian citizenship in 2012 by the order of the President of Ukraine, Viktor Yanukovych, on the basis of "distinguished services to the country".

He is married and has four children.

== Business career ==
Novynskyi began his business career in Ukraine in 1996, rising in Lukoil's North West division before acquiring smaller metallurgy companies.

In 1999, Novinskyi's combined these smaller companies to establish the Smart Group company with headquarters in Dnipropetrovsk. The same year, his partners and him created the Neva Holding company and acquired a 77% stake in the Bulgarian metallurgical plant Promet at a privatisation tender. Over the next decade, these ventures proved immensely profitable.

In 2006, Novinskyi and his billionaire business partner Andrei Klyamko united their Ukrainian metallurgy companies into Smart Holding Group. In 2007, they exchanged them for a 23.75% stake in Metinvest, in which they are junior partners with Rinat Akhmetov.

In 2010, Novinskyi's net worth was estimated at US$950 million. In 2011, this number rose to US$2.7 billion.

As of 2011, Smart Holding also owned large assets in the oil and gas sector, shipbuilding (the Black Sea, Kherson Shipyard, and Port Ochakiv) development, agriculture (Veres), finance (by controlling Unex Bank and being a minor shareholder in BM Bank, whose revenues in 2011 stood at $14.2 billion). In 2021, Unex Bank was sold to Dragon Capital, while the BM Bank was liquidated by the NBU in 2014.

As of 2013, Novynskyi had stakes in oil and gas company Regal Petroleum and supermarket chain Amstor.

In 2013, he was described as the fifth richest person in Ukraine, with a fortune of US$3.273 billion.

However, according to Ukrainian Forbes, in 2015, Vadim Novynskyi lost significant wealth and was no longer among the ten wealthiest Ukrainians.

That year, he declared UAH 107 million of income (UAH 73,235 in salary, UAH 1,616,867 of income from the sale of intellectual property rights, UAH 47,980 in dividends and interest, UAH 244 in insurance payments, and US$5 million obtained from Cyprus sources). He owned two land plots with an area of 2,257 and 50,400 m^{2}, three apartments with an area of 667,586 and 136 m^{2}, and a garage of 51 m^{2}. The nominal value of his abroad securities was UAH 6.7 million. The family also owned a land plot of 57,879 m^{2}, three apartments (57,171 and 184 m^{2}), and 453 m^{2} of other real estate.

According to the NV periodical, in 2021, he regained much of his wealth and was now the third wealthiest Ukrainian; his fortune increased to US$2.4 billion, a 50% increase compared to 2020.

In 2022, all business assets of Vadim Novinsky were transferred to the management of a trust company registered in Cyprus.

Having his fortune assessed at US$3.5 billion in February 2022, by the end of the year, Novynskyi lost US$2.1 billion. In April 2023, Forbes estimated his fortune at US$1.4 billion.

== Political career ==
Novynskyi contested the 2013 by-election in constituency 224 in Sevastopol, on the Crimean Peninsula, as an independent candidate, pledging to join the then-ruling Party of Regions if elected. Novynskyi won the vote with 53.4%, with an off-cycle turnout of 23.9%. He became a Party of Regions member on 5 September 2013.

Novynskyi opposed the March 2014 annexation of Crimea by Russia. He was therefore banned by local and Russian federal authorities from entering his constituency, as well as the Crimean peninsula as a whole.

Since the initial conflict between Russia and Ukraine began in 2014, Novynskyi has consistently supported the peace process on the side of Ukraine. In the spring of 2014, he was a member of a Ukrainian delegation at talks with separatist (DPR and LPR) leaders in Lugansk.

Novynskyi was unable to run for re-election in 2014 in his constituency due to the Russian annexation, but contested the vote on the electoral list of the Opposition Bloc, which was established after his Party of Regions was banned by the new authorities that came to power with the 2014 Ukrainian Revolution. He once again won the election, placing 11th from his party.

From 2017 to 2019, he headed the public organisation "Party of Peace", which proclaimed to intensify the negotiation process between Ukraine and the self-proclaimed republics (DPR and LPR) based on the Minsk agreements.

In May 2018, he initiated the international conference "The Balkan experience of achieving peace: lessons for Ukraine” in Zagreb, Croatia. It was attended by well-known politicians and experts from Ukraine, Croatia, Serbia, Montenegro, Bosnia and Herzegovina, North Macedonia, Austria and the disputed republic of Kosovo.

Novynskyi contested the 2019 Ukrainian parliamentary election in the Donbas, specifically the 57th single-seat constituency, located in the Donetsk Oblast. He won, receiving 42.6% of the votes cast and took office for his third term in parliament.

When Russia invaded Ukraine in February 2022, Novynskyi remained in the country, condemned the invasion, said there could be no excuses for it. He resigned from parliament in June 2022. He left Ukraine in 2023.

== Religious life ==
Novynskyi is an active parishioner and patron of the Ukrainian Orthodox Church (UOC), and is a protodeacon.

On 23 April 2020, it became known that Metropolitan Onufriy (Berezovsky), Primate of the UOC, ordained Novinsky as a deacon. This was not officially reported; unofficially, the date of the ordination was 7 April. Novynskyi served as a deacon for the first time in public at the Kyiv Pechersk Lavra on 7 June, the Feast of Pentecost.

In the media, Novynskyi actively defends the UOC and has criticised the religious separation of Ukrainian Orthodoxy after the similarly named, uncanonical, schismatic, and state-backed Orthodox Church of Ukraine (OCU) was recognised by the Ecumenical Patriarchate of Constantinople. Known for his uncompromising position regarding what he believes to be the persecution of the UOC by the authorities, he has repeatedly entered into public discussions with officials, including Presidents Petro Poroshenko and Volodymyr Zelenskyy, on issues of religious policy in Ukraine. Novynskyi has argued that his religious views have motivated governmental and prosecutorial actions against him.

On 23 April 2023, Novynskyi was allegedly spotted serving at a Liturgy at a Russian Orthodox Church (ROC) parish in Zürich, Switzerland. This is despite the UOC breaking all administrative ties with the ROC after condemning the Russian invasion in 2022.

== Charity ==
In 2017, the Vadym Novynskyi Foundation became a partner of the All-Ukrainian charitable project "Help the Heart Beating". The Foundation also supports the rehabilitation program for children and young people diagnosed with cerebral palsy and organic nervous system lesions.

Since the start of the Russian invasion, the Vadym Novynskyi Foundation has restructured its work to direct much of the resources to humanitarian assistance to doctors, those affected by the war and the Armed Forces of Ukraine. From February to October 2022, the Foundation delivered aid for more than UAH 900 million. In particular, it is implementing a humanitarian project to deliver ambulances. 40,000 food packages were dispatched to various regions of Ukraine. Medical equipment worth UAH 15 million were purchased for hospitals in Zaporizhzhia.

In October–December 2022, the Novynskyi Foundation purchased and imported hundreds of generators to Ukraine to provide electricity to settlements affected by hostilities and rocket attacks.

== Controversies ==
=== Criticism ===
Many have described Novynskyi as a Russian-born oligarch who made a major fortune on dubious privatisation deals during the "dashing 1990s".

=== Sanctions by Russia ===
On 25 December 2018, Novynskyi was included in the list of persons against whom Russia imposed sanctions. In July 2019, as part of a delegation of the UOC, he was allowed to visit the Trinity-Sergius Lavra in Sergiyev Posad, Moscow Region, where he met with the head of the Russian Orthodox Church (ROC) Patriarch Kirill. At the time, the UOC had not yet severed all administrative ties with the ROC, even though it has been self-governing since 1991. On 20 April 2020, he was excluded from the Russian sanctions list.

=== Sanctions by Ukraine ===
Ten months into the Russian invasion of Ukraine, Novynskyi was accused of assisting Russia, although he was not criminally charged. Instead, on 6 December 2022 and again on 25 January 2023, he was included in the Ukrainian sanctions list. Novynskyi's supporters have argued that he has condemned the Russian invasion and actively helped Ukraine. The President's Office subsequently seized his property worth more than US$1 billion.

A week before this imposition of sanctions against him, Novynskyi legally transferred the shares of enterprises owned by him to the trust of a company registered in Cyprus. The authorities decided it was done through manipulation, thereafter annulled the agreement and reinstated Novynskyi as the registered shareholder of his enterprises.

In April 2023, Ukrainian domestic intelligence and prosecutors searched his group's offices in Kyiv on the suspicion of tax fraud and supporting Russian interests, and blocked assets worth almost 100 million US$.

In his official statement, Novynskyi accused the authorities of raiding and persecuting him for his defence of the UOC, which the government is attempting to ban. Presently, Novynskyi is awaiting for the consideration of his appeals by the European Court of Human Rights.

=== Criminal proceedings ===
On 8 December 2016, on the proposal of the Office of the Prosecutor General, Novynskyi was deprived of parliamentary immunity. At the time of voting, Novynskyi noted that the draft resolution on bringing him to criminal liability was not published on the official website of the Verkhovna Rada as required by Ukrainian law. Ultimately, the Office of the Prosecutor General did not present evidence of his guilt, but remained a witness until the case was closed.

On 18 January 2025, Novynskyi was charged with high treason and incitement to religious hatred in absentia, based largely on psycholinguistic analyses of his public statements. Novynskyi has argued that the escalation is political, aimed at proceeding with a full ban on the UOC and creating an authoritarian state. The government has dismissed such characterisation as Russian propaganda.

== Awards ==
- Greek Orthodox Church of Jerusalem: Golden Cross of the High Taxiarch of the Knights of the Most Holy Sepulcher (January 2019)
