= Odesa Polytechnic National University =

Public university in Odesa, Ukraine

Coordinates: 46°27′38″N 30°45′05″E

- Національний університет «Одеська політехніка»
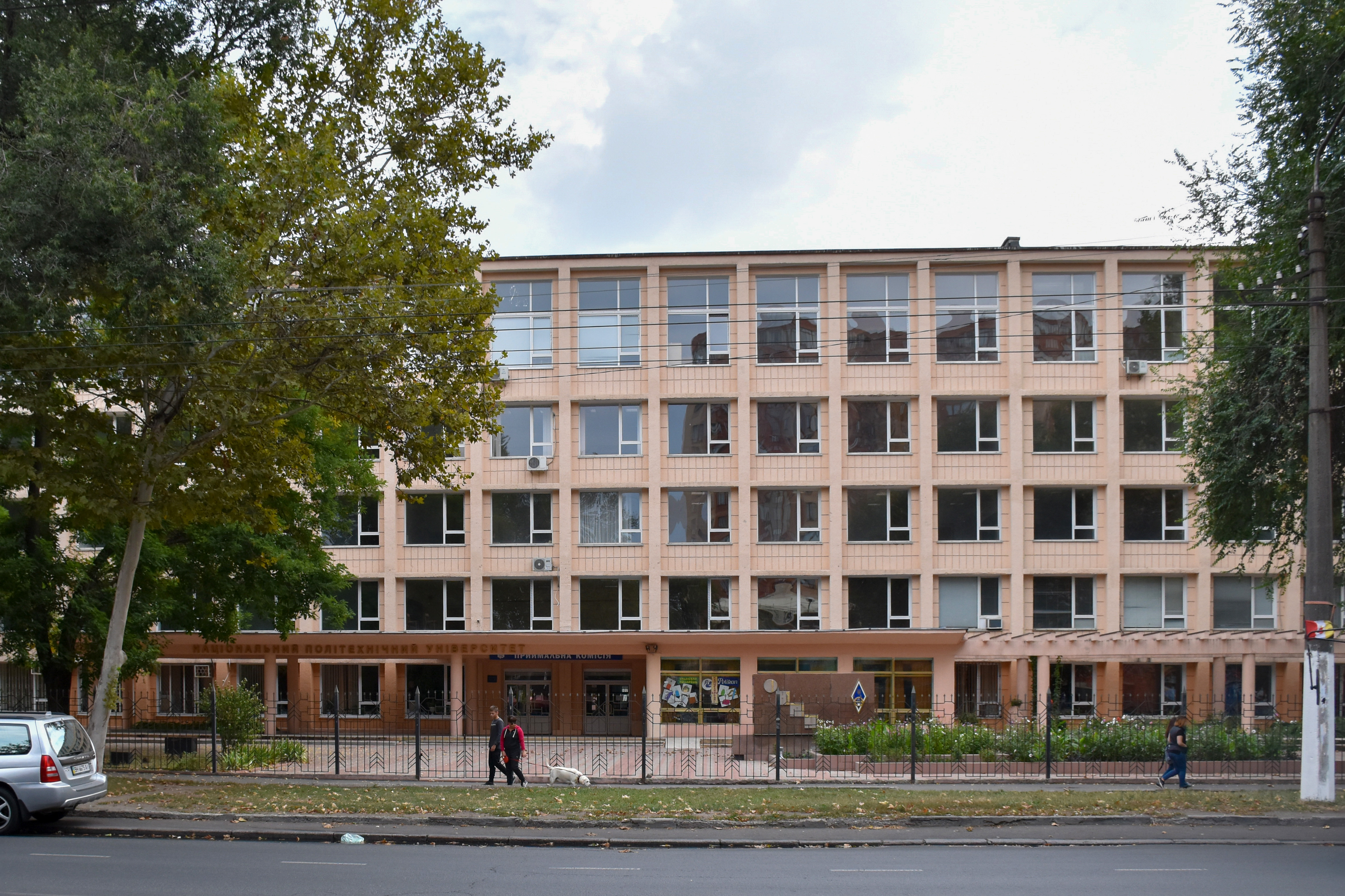
- Motto: Ex Professo
- Type: Public
- Established: 1918
- Affiliations: Ministry of Education and Science of Ukraine
- Rector: Hennadii Oborskyi
- Administrative staff: 4000
- Students: ~15,000
- Location: Odesa, Ukraine
- Campus: Urban
- Website: op.edu.ua/en

The Odesa Polytechnic National University (Ukrainian: Національний університет «Одеська політехніка», romanized: Natsionalnyi universytet "Odeska politekhnika") is a Ukrainian state-sponsored university of higher education and research in Odesa, Ukraine.

== History ==
The university was established on September 18, 1918. Over the years, the ONPU launched thousands of youth into professional life. Among its graduates are many talented engineers, scientists, heads of scientific organizations and universities, top management staff at different industries, as well as political actors.

== Academics ==
Nowadays, the university represents a huge training center of high-qualification personnel in the south Ukraine. The Odesa National Polytechnic University figures among 14 Ukrainian universities, members of the European Universities Association, as well as among four Ukrainian universities, members of International Universities Association.

ONPU created a "polytechnic university" complex consolidating licea, high schools, colleges, and technical schools of the whole southern Ukraine region. 20,000 of students, graduate employees, post-graduate students are trained here, the process being affected by 4,000 lecturers, researchers and practical engineers. There are 57 academicians and corresponding members of both special Ukraine Academies of Science, more than 120 professors and Doctors of sciences, almost 450 senior lecturers, Ph.D., 21 honored workers of Science and Engineering of Ukraine, honored worker of the National Education of Ukraine, 13 academicians of international academies.

The teaching process follows a multistage system: Bachelor, Specialist (practical engineer), Master of Science, Candidate of Science (Ph.D.) and the Doctor of Science. The Odesa Polytechnic National University structure includes 11 institutes, ten faculties, 62 departments, technical school and college.

== Structure ==
- Ukrainian-German Institute
- Extramural Engineering Studies Institute
- Undergraduate Institute (Preparatory Studies)
- Institute of Radioelectronics and Telecommunications
- Industrial Technologies, Design and Management Institute
- Machine-Building Engineering Institute
- Foreign Students Preparatory Institute
- Institute of Computer Systems
- Power Engineering Institute
- Electromechanics and Energy Consumption Institute
- Business, Economics and Information Technologies Institute
- Humanities Faculty

== Notable alumni ==
- Atroschenko Vasily Ivanovych, graduated in 1931, Doctor (Engineering), Academician by the Ukrainian Soviet Socialist Republic Academy of Sciences, Honored Actor of Science of Ukrainian SSR, Laureate of USSR State Prize, Hero of the Socialist Work, awardee of the two Lenin Orders and an Order of the Red Labor Banner.
- Boreskov Georgy Konstantinovych, graduated in 1929, Doctor (Engineering), Academician by the Union of Soviet Socialist Republics Academy of Sciences, three times awarded with the Laureate of USSR State Prize, Hero of the Socialist Work, Director of the USSR Academy of Sciences’ Siberia Branch Institute of Catalysis.
- Gorbenko Mstislav Mstislavovyc, graduated in 1970, alpinist, Master of sports in alpinism, Ist category instructor, holder of “Snow Leopard” prize, Master of sport of international category, Honored Master of sport of USSR, Honored Trainer of Ukraine, Honored Worker of Physical Culture and Sports, National rank referee, awarded with “Deserved Merits” IInd and IIIrd degree Orders, “Edelweiss” Ist and IInd degree Orders, “50 years of summiting the Everest” jubilee medal by Nepali King. First Ukrainian, who in 1990 within an international expedition, climbed Everest.
- Ennan Alim Abdul-Amidovych, graduate of 1958, Doctor (Chemistry), Professor Honored Actor of Science and Technology of Ukrainian SSR. Awardee of: The Yaroslav the Wise Vth degree Order, Medals: “Valuant Labor, 100-years V.I. Lenin jubilee”, “Labor veteran”, sign of distinction by the Ukraine Ministry of Education and Science “Scientific achievements”. Director of the Physical Chemical Institute of the Environment and Human Protection.
- Nudelman Aleksandr Emmanuilovych, Doctor (Engineering), five times awarded with the Laureate of USSR State Prize, Laureate of the Lenin Prize, twice awardee as a Hero of the Socialist Work, Chief Engineer of the SKB-16.
- Lobanovsky Valery Vasilievych, graduate of 1966, Honored Trainer of Ukraine and USSR, Master of Sport of USSR in football. Hero of Ukraine. Awardee of the Red Labor Banner Oder, “Deserved Merits” IInd degree Order, medals “Badge of Honour”, “Valuant Labour”, “70th jubilee of the Armed Forces”, "Order of the Red Banner of Labour", the FIFA supreme sign of merit – “Deserved Merits” order. Senior trainer of USSR team, silver winner of the European Championship of 1976, twice times winner of the Cup of Cups, Supercup competition. Senior trainer of FC Dynamo Kyiv
- Molokanova, Irina Ivanova, graduate 1980, former Finance Minister for Transnistria

== Rating ==
At the rating calculated annually among more than 400 Higher educational institutions and Universities of Ukraine (evaluated by the International Staff Academy and the Ukraine Academy of Pedagogy) the Odesa National Polytechnic University holds 15–18 rates and during last five years is rated steadily in the number of TOP TEN from among technical and technological Ukrainian Universities.

== See also ==
List of universities in Ukraine
