= Ukraine's 4th electoral district =

Ukrainian electoral district

- Electoral district for the Verkhovna Rada
- Region: Autonomous Republic of Crimea
- Population: 176,570

Current Electoral district
- Created: 2012
Party
Vacant

Ukraine's 4th electoral district is a Verkhovna Rada constituency in the Autonomous Republic of Crimea. Established in its current form in 2012, it contains the cities of Yevpatoria and Saky, and the surrounding Saky Raion. The constituency is home to 176,570 registered voters, and has 136 polling stations. Since the Annexation of Crimea by the Russian Federation in 2014, the seat has been vacant.

== People's Deputies ==
Party	Member	Portrait	Election
Party of Regions	Oleh Paraskiv		2012
Vacant			2014
Vacant			2019

== Elections ==
=== 2012 ===
2012 Ukrainian parliamentary election
Party	Candidate	Votes	%
Party of Regions	Oleh Paraskiv	27,990	34.0%
Independent	Mykola Kotlyarevsky	22,856	27.8%
KPU	Kyrylo Biloshytsky	5,827	7.1%
Independent	Anatoliy Rahansky	4,668	5.7%
Independent	Volodymyr Shkaberin	3,809	4.6%
UDAR	Valentyn Pradun	3,275	4.0%
Batkivshchyna	Ihor Hafych	3,003	3.6%
Independent	Volodymyr Lutyev	2,726	3.3%
Ukraine – Forward!	Vasyl Shevtsov	1,029	1.3%
National Ecological	Svitlana Akopova	904	1.1%
Others		6,223	7.5%
Total votes		82,310	100.0%
Party of Regions win (new seat)			

== See also ==
- Electoral districts of Ukraine
- Foreign electoral district of Ukraine
