= Electoral districts of Ukraine =

Map of electoral districts of Ukraine

Ukraine is divided into 225 electoral districts for election organization and representation in the Verkhovna Rada. Each of the country's oblasts (regions) are divided into multiple districts, with a single MP representing each. Before the number of raions were reduced in 2020, each electoral district would contain several raions or a medium-sized city or a part of a large city. They consist of electoral precincts (usually about one hundred of them in each electoral district), which are territorial units of election organization one level lower, and which have the size of several communities or village councils in rural areas or several neighborhoods in cities.

As a result of the Russian armed aggression against Ukraine, starting from 2014 elections have not been held in any of the electoral districts of the Autonomous Republic of Crimea and the city of Sevastopol (constituencies number 1–10, 224 and 225), in some electoral districts of Donetsk and Luhansk oblasts (collectively known as Donbas) completely (constituencies number 41–44, 53–56, 61, 104 and 108–111) or partly (counties number 45, 46, 51, 52, 59, 60, 105–107 and 112–114). As a result, there were vacant seats in the 8th and 9th convocations of the Verkhovna Rada, which should have been occupied by majority MPs from the electoral districts in Crimea and in Donbas.

== Elections ==
The next election to the Verkhovna Rada (set to be in 2023) will be (for the first time) with different regional open lists (with again an electoral threshold of five percent) and a return (and thus an abolishment of the constituencies with first-past-the-post voting) to only one national constituency.

In the 2019 Ukrainian parliamentary election Ukraine used the mixed electoral system for the elections of people's deputies, 225 deputies were elected to the Verkhovna Rada of Ukraine by the proportional electoral system (party lists) and 225 by the first-past-the-post electoral system.

On presidential elections and for proportional part of parliamentary elections, electoral districts are intermediate links of aggregation of voting results. After the counting of ballots, precinct election commissions determine the results of voting at their precincts. Thereafter, district election commissions determine the results of voting within their electoral districts by summing up the results from all the polling stations belonging to the district. The Central Election Commission then sums up the results of all electoral districts, including the Foreign one, to determine the final results of the voting. In addition to votes counting, district election commissions also deal with many other organizational issues within their electoral districts, including appointing the personal composition of precinct election commissions.

== Formation of electoral districts ==
Electoral districts in their modern form were created on April 28, 2012, by the resolution of the Central Election Commission #82 (up to that moment there was a different system of electoral districts). Initially, they were intended to be used only for parliamentary elections, but in 2019 they were also applied for the presidential election. Different system of electoral districts was used in the 2014 presidential election. The current electoral districts system in theory can be applied to all-Ukrainian referendums, but in practice, no referendums have been held in Ukraine since 2000. The current electoral districts system was used in 2012 parliamentary election, 2014 parliamentary election, 2019 presidential election and 2019 parliamentary election.

The electoral districts were formed in a way that the voters were distributed among them as evenly as possible. The law stipulates that the deviation of the number of voters in the electoral district from the national average should not exceed 12%. At the time of electoral districts formation in 2012, this average was 161,125 voters. The law also stipulates that each electoral district must be within one administrative unit of the first level (oblast, city of Kyiv or Sevastopol, Autonomous Republic of Crimea), i.e. it is not allowed for a part of an electoral district to be in one administrative unit and another part in another unit. In addition, territories inhabited by national minorities and adjacent to each other must be included into one electoral district. Referring to this provision, the Hungarian national minority in Zakarpattia Oblast demands the restoration of Tisza electoral district, which existed prior to 2012, but in 2012 the Hungarians were divided between 73rd, 68th and 69th electoral districts, where they now are the minority of voters, which deprived them of the ability to elect their own deputy to the Verkhovna Rada. They have been denied every time, so the Zakarpattia Hungarian Culture Society since 2014 was threatening to sue Ukrainian government in the ECHR for refusing to set up an electoral district that would include territories of compact ethnic Hungarian habitation.

== Foreign electoral district ==
Territories of foreign electoral precincts in the Foreign electoral district of Ukraine

The Foreign electoral district of Ukraine is an electoral district which unites electoral precincts situated outside the territory of Ukraine and which comprises all polling stations located inside embassies and consulates of Ukraine and inside military bases abroad, where there are Ukrainian peacekeeping contingents. Foreign electoral precincts, unlike usual ones which usually comprise several administrative districts in Ukraine, are much bigger in size.

They comprise territories of countries, the whole or a part, or even parts of continents. In the Foreign electoral district there vote those Ukrainian citizens, who on the day of voting are living or just travelling abroad. Foreign district has many differences from usual electoral districts on the territory of Ukraine, but the fundamental difference is that it only aggregates votes cast abroad and do not bear the function of parliamentary representation, since majoritarian deputies are not elected there. Also, the Foreign district does not have its own district election commission, its duties are carried out by the Central Election Commission. As of 31 March 2019 there were 552,357 citizens in the lists of voters of the Foreign electoral district.

== List ==
- electoral districts completely not under government control
- electoral districts partially not under government control

District number	Region	Old raions included	Number of voters	Photograph of current MP	Current MP	Locator map	Seat of district election commission	Geo-map	Link
1	Autonomous Republic of Crimea	Parts of: Simferopol	162,822				Simferopol	Map	ED #1 on voters register website
2	Autonomous Republic of Crimea	Parts of: Simferopol, Simferopol Raion	150,497				Simferopol	Map	ED #2 on voters register website
3	Autonomous Republic of Crimea	Whole: Dzhankoy, Dzhankoy Raion, Krasnohvardiiske Raion	160,311				Dzhankoy	Map	ED #3 on voters register website
4	Autonomous Republic of Crimea	Whole: Yevpatoria, Saky, Saky Raion	176,570				Yevpatoria	Map	ED #4 on voters register website
5	Autonomous Republic of Crimea	Whole: Kerch; Parts of: Lenine Raion	143,545				Kerch	Map	ED #5 on voters register website
6	Autonomous Republic of Crimea	Whole: Feodosia, Kirovske Raion; Parts of: Lenine Raion	149,453				Feodosia	Map	ED #6 on voters register website
7	Autonomous Republic of Crimea	Whole: Alushta, Yalta	149,101				Yalta	Map	ED #7 on voters register website
8	Autonomous Republic of Crimea	Whole: Sudak, Bilohirsk Raion, Nyzhnohirskyi Raion, Sovietskyi Raion; Parts of: Simferopol Raion	145,241				Sovietskyi	Map	ED #8 on voters register website
9	Autonomous Republic of Crimea	Whole: Armyansk, Krasnoperekopsk, Krasnoperekopsk Raion, Pervomaiske Raion, Rozdolne Raion, Chornomorske Raion	144,121				Pervomaiske	Map	ED #9 on voters register website
10	Autonomous Republic of Crimea	Whole: Bakhchysarai Raion; Parts of: Simferopol Raion	159,391				Simferopol	Map	ED #10 on voters register website
11	Vinnytsia Oblast	Parts of: Vinnytsia, Vinnytsia Raion	171,986		Maksym Pashkovsky; Servant of the People since 29 August 2019		Vinnytsia	Map	ED #11 on voters register website
12	Vinnytsia Oblast	Parts of: Vinnytsia, Vinnytsia Raion	178,225		Anatoliy Drabovsky; Servant of the People since 29 August 2019		Vinnytsia	Map	ED #12 on voters register website
13	Vinnytsia Oblast	Whole: Koziatyn, Khmilnyk, Kalynivka Raion, Koziatyn Raion, Khmilnyk Raion	146,373		Petro Yurchyshyn independent since 27 November 2014		Kalynivka	Map	ED #13 on voters register website
14	Vinnytsia Oblast	Whole: Zhmerynka, Bar Raion, Zhmerynka Raion, Lityn Raion, Tyvriv Raion	159,701		Iryna Borzova; Servant of the People since 29 August 2019		Zhmerynka	Map	ED #14 on voters register website
15	Vinnytsia Oblast	Whole: Murovani Kurylivtsi Raion, Tomashpil Raion, Tulchyn Raion, Chernivtsi Raion, Sharhorod Raion	148,840		Larysa Bilozir; Trust since 29 August 2019		Sharhorod	Map	ED #15 on voters register website
16	Vinnytsia Oblast	Whole: Mohyliv-Podilskyi, Kryzhopil Raion, Mohyliv-Podilskyi Raion, Pishchanka Raion, Chechelnyk Raion, Yampil Raion	135,218		Hennadiy Vatsak independent since 29 August 2019		Yampil	Map	ED #16 on voters register website
17	Vinnytsia Oblast	Whole: Ladyzhyn, Bershad Raion, Haisyn Raion, Teplyk Raion, Trostianets Raion	157,299		Mykola Kucher independent since 27 November 2014		Ladyzhyn	Map	ED #17 on voters register website
18	Vinnytsia Oblast	Whole: Illintsi Raion, Lypovets Raion, Nemyriv Raion, Orativ Raion, Pohrebyshche Raion	135,917		Oleh Meydych; All-Ukrainian Union "Fatherland" since 29 August 2019		Illintsi	Map	ED #18 on voters register website
19	Volyn Oblast	Whole: Volodymyr-Volynskyi, Novovolynsk, Volodymyr-Volynskyi Raion, Ivanychi Raion, Liuboml Raion	139,250		Ihor Huz independent since 27 November 2014		Volodymyr-Volynskyi	Map	ED #19 on voters register website
20	Volyn Oblast	Whole: Horokhiv Raion, Lokachi Raion, Lutsk Raion, Rozhyshche Raion, Turiisk Raion	158,003		Vyacheslav Rublyov; Servant of the People since 29 August 2019		Horokhiv	Map	ED #20 on voters register website
21	Volyn Oblast	Whole: Kovel, Kovel Raion, Ratne Raion, Stara Vyzhivka Raion, Shatsk Raion	153,214		Stepan Ivakhiv independent since 12 December 2012		Kovel	Map	ED #21 on voters register website
22	Volyn Oblast	Whole: Lutsk	155,030		Ihor Palytsia independent since 29 August 2019		Lutsk	Map	ED #22 on voters register website
23	Volyn Oblast	Whole: Kamin-Kashyrskyi Raion, Kivertsi Raion, Liubeshiv Raion, Manevychi Raion	159,369		Iryna Konstankevych independent since 6 September 2016		Manevychi	Map	ED #23 on voters register website
24	Dnipropetrovsk Oblast	Parts of: Dnipro	151,173		Dmytro Kysylevsky; Servant of the People since 29 August 2019		Dnipro	Map	ED #24 on voters register website
25	Dnipropetrovsk Oblast	Parts of: Dnipro	141,381		Maksym Buzhanskyi; Servant of the People since 29 August 2019		Dnipro	Map	ED #25 on voters register website
26	Dnipropetrovsk Oblast	Parts of: Dnipro	136,161		Kyryll Nesterenko; Servant of the People since 29 August 2019		Dnipro	Map	ED #26 on voters register website
27	Dnipropetrovsk Oblast	Parts of: Dnipro	134,226		Vyacheslav Medyanyk; Servant of the People since 29 August 2019		Dnipro	Map	ED #27 on voters register website
28	Dnipropetrovsk Oblast	Parts of: Dnipro	140,987		Yuriy Mysyahin; Servant of the People since 29 August 2019		Dnipro	Map	ED #28 on voters register website
29	Dnipropetrovsk Oblast	Whole: Dnipro Raion, Petrykivka Raion; Parts of: Dnipro	143,744		Sergiy Demchenko; Servant of the People since 29 August 2019		Slobozhanske	Map	ED #29 on voters register website
30	Dnipropetrovsk Oblast	Parts of: Kamianske	155,292		Hanna Lichman; Servant of the People since 29 August 2019		Kamianske	Map	ED #30 on voters register website
31	Dnipropetrovsk Oblast	Parts of: Kryvyi Rih	163,908		Volodymyr Zakharchenko; Servant of the People since 29 August 2019		Kryvyi Rih	Map	ED #31 on voters register website
32	Dnipropetrovsk Oblast	Parts of: Kryvyi Rih	164,795		Olena Kryvoruchkina; Servant of the People since 29 August 2019		Kryvyi Rih	Map	ED #32 on voters register website
33	Dnipropetrovsk Oblast	Parts of: Kryvyi Rih	139,006		Yuriy Koryavchenkov; Servant of the People since 29 August 2019		Kryvyi Rih	Map	ED #33 on voters register website
34	Dnipropetrovsk Oblast	Whole: Vilnohirsk, Zhovti Vody, Verkhnodniprovsk Raion, Piatykhatky Raion, Tsarychanka Raion	146,272		Dmytro Chorny; Servant of the People since 29 August 2019		Tsarychanka	Map	ED #34 on voters register website
35	Dnipropetrovsk Oblast	Whole: Nikopol, Pokrov, Nikopol Raion	158,051		Denys Herman; Servant of the People since 29 August 2019		Nikopol	Map	ED #35 on voters register website
36	Dnipropetrovsk Oblast	Whole: Pavlohrad, Pershotravensk, Ternivka, Pavlohrad Raion	149,657		Roman Kaptyelov; Servant of the People since 29 August 2019		Pavlohrad	Map	ED #36 on voters register website
37	Dnipropetrovsk Oblast	Whole: Apostolove Raion, Kryvyi Rih Raion, Sofiivka Raion, Shyroke Raion; Parts of: Kryvyi Rih	143,627		Dmytro Shpenov independent since 12 December 2012		Kryvyi Rih	Map	ED #37 on voters register website
38	Dnipropetrovsk Oblast	Whole: Novomoskovsk, Mahdalynivka Raion, Novomoskovsk Raion, Yurivka Raion	144,763		Vladyslav Borodin; Servant of the People since 29 August 2019		Novomoskovsk	Map	ED #38 on voters register website
39	Dnipropetrovsk Oblast	Whole: Synelnykove, Vasylkivka Raion, Mezhova Raion, Petropavlivka Raion, Pokrovske Raion, Synelnykove Raion	144,971		Serhiy Severyn; Servant of the People since 29 August 2019		Vasylkivka	Map	ED #39 on voters register website
40	Dnipropetrovsk Oblast	Whole: Marhanets, Krynychky Raion, Solone Raion, Tomakivka Raion; Parts of: Kamianske	139,891		Oleksandr Trukhin; Servant of the People since 29 August 2019		Krynychky	Map	ED #40 on voters register website
41	Donetsk Oblast	Parts of: Donetsk	151,531				Donetsk	Map	ED #41 on voters register website
42	Donetsk Oblast	Parts of: Donetsk	147,740				Donetsk	Map	ED #42 on voters register website
43	Donetsk Oblast	Parts of: Donetsk	157,224				Donetsk	Map	ED #43 on voters register website
44	Donetsk Oblast	Parts of: Donetsk	162,108				Donetsk	Map	ED #44 on voters register website
45	Donetsk Oblast	Whole: Avdiivka, Yasynuvata, Yasynuvata Raion; Parts of: Donetsk	44,145		Musa Magomedov; Opposition Bloc since 29 August 2019		Ocheretyne	Map	ED #45 on voters register website
46	Donetsk Oblast	Whole: Bakhmut, Lyman; Parts of: Bakhmut Raion	147,759		Fedir Khrystenko; Opposition Platform — For Life since 29 August 2019		Bakhmut	Map	ED #46 on voters register website
47	Donetsk Oblast	Whole: Sloviansk, Oleksandrivka Raion, Sloviansk Raion	132,748		Yuriy Solod; Opposition Platform — For Life since 27 November 2014		Sloviansk	Map	ED #47 on voters register website
48	Donetsk Oblast	Whole: Kramatorsk	144,983		Maksym Yefimov independent since 27 November 2014		Kramatorsk	Map	ED #48 on voters register website
49	Donetsk Oblast	Whole: Druzhkivka, Kostiantynivka, Kostiantynivka Raion, Pokrovsk Raion	142,688		Valeriy Hnatenko; Opposition Platform — For Life since 29 August 2019		Druzhkivka	Map	ED #49 on voters register website
50	Donetsk Oblast	Whole: Dobropillia, Myrnohrad, Pokrovsk, Dobropillia Raion	152,595		Ruslan Trebushkin; Opposition Bloc since 29 August 2019		Pokrovsk	Map	ED #50 on voters register website
51	Donetsk Oblast	Parts of: Horlivka, Bakhmut Raion	3,134		Oleksandr Kovalyov independent since 29 August 2019		Zaitseve	Map	ED #51 on voters register website
52	Donetsk Oblast	Whole: Debaltseve, Toretsk; Parts of: Horlivka, Bakhmut Raion	63,026		Yevhen Yakovenko; All-Ukrainian Union "Fatherland" since 29 August 2019		Toretsk	Map	ED #52 on voters register website
53	Donetsk Oblast	Whole: Yenakiieve, Chystyakove	174,275				Yenakiieve	Map	ED #53 on voters register website
54	Donetsk Oblast	Whole: Khartsyzk, Shakhtarsk, Shakhtarsk Raion	155,520				Shakhtarsk	Map	ED #54 on voters register website
55	Donetsk Oblast	Whole: Zhdanivka, Khrestivka; Parts of: Makiivka	166,118				Makiivka	Map	ED #55 on voters register website
56	Donetsk Oblast	Parts of: Makiivka	168,769				Makiivka	Map	ED #56 on voters register website
57	Donetsk Oblast	Parts of: Mariupol	158,794		Vadym Novynskyi; Opposition Bloc since 29 August 2019		Mariupol	Map	ED #57 on voters register website
58	Donetsk Oblast	Parts of: Mariupol	156,825		Serhiy Mahera; Opposition Bloc since 29 August 2019		Mariupol	Map	ED #58 on voters register website
59	Donetsk Oblast	Whole: Vuhledar, Novohrodivka, Selydove, Velyka Novosilka Raion, Marinka Raion	151,512		Volodymyr Moroz; Opposition Platform — For Life since 29 August 2019		Marinka	Map	ED #59 on voters register website
60	Donetsk Oblast	Whole: Telmanove Raion, Volnovakha Raion, Manhush Raion, Nikolske Raion, Novoazovsk Raion; Parts of: Mariupol	104,421		Dmytro Lubinets; For the Future since 27 November 2014		Volnovakha	Map	ED #60 on voters register website
61	Donetsk Oblast	Whole: Dokuchaievsk, Snizhne, Amvrosiivka Raion, Starobesheve Raion	151,973				Starobesheve	Map	ED #61 on voters register website
62	Zhytomyr Oblast	Parts of: Zhytomyr	166,121		Ihor Herasymenko; Servant of the People since 29 August 2019		Zhytomyr	Map	ED #62 on voters register website
63	Zhytomyr Oblast	Whole: Berdychiv, Andrushivka Raion, Berdychiv Raion, Popilnia Raion, Ruzhyn Raion	158,727		Bohdan Kytsak; Servant of the People since 29 August 2019		Berdychiv	Map	ED #63 on voters register website
64	Zhytomyr Oblast	Whole: Korosten, Korosten Raion, Luhyny Raion, Ovruch Raion, Olevsk Raion	157,668		Volodymyr Areshonkov independent since 27 November 2014		Korosten	Map	ED #64 on voters register website
65	Zhytomyr Oblast	Whole: Zviahel, Baranivka Raion, Yemilchyne Raion, Zviahel Raion, Pulyny Raion	148,445		Dmytro Kostiuk; Servant of the People since 29 August 2019		Zviahel	Map	ED #65 on voters register website
66	Zhytomyr Oblast	Whole: Malyn, Brusyliv Raion, Korostyshiv Raion, Malyn Raion, Narodychi Raion, Radomyshl Raion, Khoroshiv Raion, Cherniakhiv Raion	163,549		Tetyana Hryshchenko; Servant of the People since 29 August 2019		Malyn	Map	ED #66 on voters register website
67	Zhytomyr Oblast	Whole: Zhytomyr Raion, Liubar Raion, Romaniv Raion, Chudniv Raion; Parts of: Zhytomyr	167,620		Serhiy Kuzminykh; Servant of the People since 29 August 2019		Chudniv	Map	ED #67 on voters register website
68	Zakarpattia Oblast	Whole: Uzhhorod, Chop, Uzhhorod Raion	155,185		Robert Horvat independent since 27 November 2014		Uzhhorod	Map	ED #68 on voters register website
69	Zakarpattia Oblast	Whole: Mukachevo; Parts of: Berehove Raion, Irshava Raion, Mukachevo Raion	155,895		Viktor Baloha; United Centre since 12 December 2012		Mukachevo	Map	ED #69 on voters register website
70	Zakarpattia Oblast	Whole: Velykyi Bereznyi Raion, Volovets Raion, Mizhhirya Raion, Perechyn Raion, Svaliava Raion; Parts of: Mukachevo Raion	162,364		Mykhaylo Laba; Servant of the People since 29 August 2019		Svaliava	Map	ED #70 on voters register website
71	Zakarpattia Oblast	Whole: Khust, Khust Raion; Parts of: Irshava Raion, Tiachiv Raion	152,412		Valerii Lunchenko independent since 29 August 2019		Khust	Map	ED #71 on voters register website
72	Zakarpattia Oblast	Whole: Rakhiv Raion; Parts of: Tiachiv Raion	172,422		Vasyl Petiovka independent since 12 December 2012		Tiachiv	Map	ED #72 on voters register website
73	Zakarpattia Oblast	Whole: Berehove, Vynohradiv Raion; Parts of: Berehove Raion, Irshava Raion	146,362		Vladislav Polyak independent since 29 August 2019		Vynohradiv	Map	ED #73 on voters register website
74	Zaporizhzhia Oblast	Parts of: Zaporizhzhia	135,691		Hennadiy Kasay; Servant of the People since 29 August 2019		Zaporizhzhia	Map	ED #74 on voters register website
75	Zaporizhzhia Oblast	Parts of: Zaporizhzhia	154,288		Roman Sokha; Servant of the People since 29 August 2019		Zaporizhzhia	Map	ED #75 on voters register website
76	Zaporizhzhia Oblast	Parts of: Zaporizhzhia	156,164		Yevheniy Shevchenko; Servant of the People since 29 August 2019		Zaporizhzhia	Map	ED #76 on voters register website
77	Zaporizhzhia Oblast	Parts of: Zaporizhzhia	135,428		Serhiy Shtepa; Servant of the People since 29 August 2019		Zaporizhzhia	Map	ED #77 on voters register website
78	Zaporizhzhia Oblast	Whole: Berdiansk, Berdyansk Raion, Bilmak Raion, Rozivka Raion, Chernihivka Raion	151,412		Oleksandr Serhiyovych Ponomarov; Opposition Platform — For Life since 12 December 2012		Berdiansk	Map	ED #78 on voters register website
79	Zaporizhzhia Oblast	Whole: Enerhodar, Vasylivka Raion, Velyka Bilozerka Raion, Kamianka-Dniprovska Raion; Parts of: Orikhiv Raion	166,326		Yulia Yatsyk; Servant of the People since 29 August 2019		Vasylivka	Map	ED #79 on voters register website
80	Zaporizhzhia Oblast	Whole: Melitopol, Melitopol Raion	156,022		Serhiy Minko independent since 29 August 2019		Melitopol	Map	ED #80 on voters register website
81	Zaporizhzhia Oblast	Whole: Tokmak, Vesele Raion, Mykhailivka Raion, Pryazovske Raion, Prymorsk Raion, Tokmak Raion, Yakymivka Raion	157,622		Pavlo Melnyk; Servant of the People since 29 August 2019		Tokmak	Map	ED #81 on voters register website
82	Zaporizhzhia Oblast	Whole: Huliaipole Raion, Vilniansk Raion, Zaporizhzhia Raion, Novomykolaivka Raion, Polohy Raion; Parts of: Orikhiv Raion	151,063		Maryna Nikitina; Servant of the People since 29 August 2019		Polohy	Map	ED #82 on voters register website
83	Ivano-Frankivsk Oblast	Parts of: Ivano-Frankivsk	167,233		Oksana Savchuk; Svoboda since 29 August 2019		Ivano-Frankivsk	Map	ED #83 on voters register website
84	Ivano-Frankivsk Oblast	Whole: Burshtyn, Tysmenytsia Raion, Tlumach Raion; Parts of: Ivano-Frankivsk, Halych Raion	162,537		Ihor Fris; Servant of the People since 29 August 2019		Tysmenytsia	Map	ED #84 on voters register website
85	Ivano-Frankivsk Oblast	Whole: Kalush, Kalush Raion, Rohatyn Raion; Parts of: Halych Raion	137,301		Eduard Proshchuk; Servant of the People since 29 August 2019		Kalush	Map	ED #85 on voters register website
86	Ivano-Frankivsk Oblast	Whole: Bolekhiv, Dolyna Raion, Rozhniativ Raion; Parts of: Bohorodchany Raion	144,490		Oleksandr Matusevych; Servant of the People since 29 August 2019		Dolyna	Map	ED #86 on voters register website
87	Ivano-Frankivsk Oblast	Whole: Yaremche, Nadvirna Raion; Parts of: Bohorodchany Raion, Kolomyia Raion	148,532		Zinoviy Andriyovych; Servant of the People since 29 August 2019		Nadvirna	Map	ED #87 on voters register website
88	Ivano-Frankivsk Oblast	Whole: Kolomyia, Horodenka Raion; Parts of: Kolomyia Raion	154,869		Andriy Ivanchuk independent since 29 August 2019		Kolomyia	Map	ED #88 on voters register website
89	Ivano-Frankivsk Oblast	Whole: Verkhovyna Raion, Kosiv Raion, Sniatyn Raion	140,515		Volodymyr Tymofiychuk; Servant of the People since 29 August 2019		Sniatyn	Map	ED #89 on voters register website
90	Kyiv Oblast	Whole: Bila Tserkva	148,762		Mykola Babenko; Right will of Ukraine since 29 August 2019		Bila Tserkva	Map	ED #90 on voters register website
91	Kyiv Oblast	Whole: Fastiv, Makariv Raion, Fastiv Raion; Parts of: Kyiv-Sviatoshyn Raion, Skvyra Raion	149,001		Oleh Dunda; Servant of the People since 29 August 2019		Makariv	Map	ED #91 on voters register website
92	Kyiv Oblast	Whole: Bila Tserkva Raion, Volodarka Raion, Stavyshche Raion, Tarashcha Raion, Tetiiv Raion; Parts of: Skvyra Raion	148,756		Valeriy Kolyukh; Servant of the People since 29 August 2019		Uzyn	Map	ED #92 on voters register website
93	Kyiv Oblast	Whole: Pereiaslav, Rzhyshchiv, Bohuslav Raion, Kaharlyk Raion, Myronivka Raion, Rokytne Raion	138,897		Anna Skorokhod; Servant of the People since 29 August 2019		Myronivka	Map	ED #93 on voters register website
94	Kyiv Oblast	Whole: Vasylkiv, Obukhiv, Vasylkiv Raion, Obukhiv Raion	152,091		Oleksandr Dubinsky; Servant of the People since 29 August 2019		Obukhiv	Map	ED #94 on voters register website
95	Kyiv Oblast	Whole: Irpin; Parts of: Kyiv-Sviatoshyn Raion	203,248		Oleksandr Horobets; Servant of the People since 29 August 2019		Irpin	Map	ED #95 on voters register website
96	Kyiv Oblast	Whole: Bucha, Slavutych, Borodianka Raion, Vyshhorod Raion, Ivankiv Raion, Poliske Raion	184,942		Olha Smahlyuk-Vasylevska; Servant of the People since 29 August 2019		Vyshhorod	Map	ED #96 on voters register website
97	Kyiv Oblast	Whole: Berezan, Brovary, Baryshivka Raion; Parts of: Brovary Raion	179,157		Mykola Halushko; Servant of the People since 29 August 2019		Brovary	Map	ED #97 on voters register website
98	Kyiv Oblast	Whole: Boryspil, Boryspil Raion, Zghurivka Raion, Pereiaslav-Khmelnytskyi Raion, Yahotyn Raion; Parts of: Brovary Raion	176,926		Serhiy Bunin; Servant of the People since 29 August 2019		Yahotyn	Map	ED #98 on voters register website
99	Kirovohrad Oblast	Parts of: Kropyvnytskyi	164,753		Oleksandr Danutsa; Servant of the People since 29 August 2019		Kropyvnytskyi	Map	ED #99 on voters register website
100	Kirovohrad Oblast	Whole: Bobrynets Raion, Vilshanka Raion, Dobrovelychkivka Raion, Kompaniivka Raion, Kropyvnytskyi Raion, Novoukrainka Raion; Parts of: Kropyvnytskyi	146,897		Ihor Murdiy; Servant of the People since 29 August 2019		Bobrynets	Map	ED #100 on voters register website
101	Kirovohrad Oblast	Whole: Blahovishchenske Raion, Haivoron Raion, Holovanivsk Raion, Mala Vyska Raion, Novoarkhanhelsk Raion, Novomyrhorod Raion	139,305		Yuriy Kuzbyt; Servant of the People since 29 August 2019		Holovanivsk	Map	ED #101 on voters register website
102	Kirovohrad Oblast	Whole: Znamianka, Svitlovodsk, Znamianka Raion, Novhorodka Raion, Oleksandrivka Raion, Onufriivka Raion, Svitlovodsk Raion	140,449		Oles Dovgiy independent since 27 November 2014		Znamianka	Map	ED #102 on voters register website
103	Kirovohrad Oblast	Whole: Oleksandriia, Dolynska Raion, Oleksandriia Raion, Petrove Raion, Ustynivka Raion	142,671		Oleh Voronko; Servant of the People since 29 August 2019		Oleksandriia	Map	ED #103 on voters register website
104	Luhansk Oblast	Whole: Lutuhyne; Parts of: Luhansk, Lutuhyne Raion	178,334				Luhansk	Map	ED #104 on voters register website
105	Luhansk Oblast	Parts of: Luhansk, Novoaidar Raion	9,411		VIktoriya Hryb; Opposition Bloc since 29 August 2019		Luhansk	Map	ED #105 on voters register website
106	Luhansk Oblast	Whole: Sievierodonetsk; Parts of: Kadiivka, Popasna Raion	98,868		Oleksiy Kuznyetsov; Servant of the People since 29 August 2019		Sievierodonetsk	Map	ED #106 on voters register website
107	Luhansk Oblast	Whole: Lysychansk; Parts of: Kadiivka, Pervomaisk, Popasna Raion	103,049		Oleksandr Sukhov independent since 29 August 2019		Lysychansk	Map	ED #107 on voters register website
108	Luhansk Oblast	Whole: Khrustalny, Perevalsk Raion	161,450				Krasnyi Luch	Map	ED #108 on voters register website
109	Luhansk Oblast	Whole: Sorokyne, Sorokyne Raion; Parts of: Luhansk	169,977				Krasnodon	Map	ED #109 on voters register website
110	Luhansk Oblast	Whole: Alchevsk, Antratsyt; Parts of: Antratsyt Raion, Lutuhyne Raion	177,508				Alchevsk	Map	ED #110 on voters register website
111	Luhansk Oblast	Whole: Dovzhansk, Rovenky, Dovzhansk Raion; Parts of: Antratsyt Raion	171,785				Sverdlovsk	Map	ED #111 on voters register website
112	Luhansk Oblast	Whole: Brianka, Kirovsk, Rubizhne; Parts of: Pervomaisk, Popasna Raion	65,081		Serhiy Velmozhny independent since 29 August 2019		Rubizhne	Map	ED #112 on voters register website
113	Luhansk Oblast	Whole: Bilokurakyne Raion, Kreminna Raion, Svatove Raion, Starobilsk Raion, Troitske Raion, Novoaidar Raion	145,650		Oleksandr Lukashev; Opposition Platform — For Life since 29 August 2019		Svatove	Map	ED #113 on voters register website
114	Luhansk Oblast	Whole: Bilovodsk Raion, Markivka Raion, Milove Raion, Novopskov Raion, Slovianoserbsk Raion, Stanytsia-Luhanska Raion	105,914		Serhii Shakhov independent since 6 September 2016		Bilovodsk	Map	ED #114 on voters register website
115	Lviv Oblast	Parts of: Lviv	168,781		Nataliya Pipa; Voice since 29 August 2019		Lviv	Map	ED #115 on voters register website
116	Lviv Oblast	Parts of: Lviv	170,998		Mykola Kniazhytskyi; European Solidarity since 29 August 2019		Lviv	Map	ED #116 on voters register website
117	Lviv Oblast	Parts of: Lviv	168,996		Yaroslav Rushchyshyn; Voice since 29 August 2019		Lviv	Map	ED #117 on voters register website
118	Lviv Oblast	Whole: Pustomyty Raion; Parts of: Lviv	171,382		Halyna Vasylchenko; Voice since 29 August 2019		Lviv	Map	ED #118 on voters register website
119	Lviv Oblast	Whole: Brody Raion, Busk Raion, Radekhiv Raion; Parts of: Kamianka-Buzka Raion	148,887		Mykhaylo Bondar; European Solidarity since 27 November 2014		Brody	Map	ED #119 on voters register website
120	Lviv Oblast	Whole: Horodok Raion, Mostyska Raion; Parts of: Sambir Raion	149,974		Yaroslav Dubnevych independent since 12 December 2012		Horodok	Map	ED #120 on voters register website
121	Lviv Oblast	Whole: Boryslav, Drohobych, Truskavets, Drohobych Raion	169,070		Orest Salamakha; Servant of the People since 29 August 2019		Drohobych	Map	ED #121 on voters register website
122	Lviv Oblast	Whole: Zhovkva Raion, Yavoriv Raion	178,460		Pavlo Bakunets; Self Reliance since 29 August 2019		Yavoriv	Map	ED #122 on voters register website
123	Lviv Oblast	Whole: Novyi Rozdil, Zolochiv Raion, Mykolaiv Raion, Peremyshliany Raion	152,909		Taras Batenko independent since 27 November 2014		Peremyshliany	Map	ED #123 on voters register website
124	Lviv Oblast	Whole: Chervonohrad, Sokal Raion; Parts of: Kamianka-Buzka Raion	142,887		Yuriy Kamelchuk; Servant of the People since 29 August 2019		Sokal	Map	ED #124 on voters register website
125	Lviv Oblast	Whole: Sambir, Skole Raion, Staryi Sambir Raion, Turka Raion; Parts of: Sambir Raion	160,179		Andrii Lopushanskyi independent since 27 November 2014		Staryi Sambir	Map	ED #125 on voters register website
126	Lviv Oblast	Whole: Morshyn, Stryi, Zhydachiv Raion, Stryi Raion	146,888		Andriy Kit independent since 27 November 2014		Stryi	Map	ED #126 on voters register website
127	Mykolaiv Oblast	Whole: Ochakiv, Mykolaiv Raion, Ochakiv Raion; Parts of: Mykolaiv	144,593		Oleksandr Pasichny; Servant of the People since 29 August 2019		Mykolaiv	Map	ED #127 on voters register website
128	Mykolaiv Oblast	Parts of: Mykolaiv	162,460		Oleksandr Haydu; Servant of the People since 29 August 2019		Mykolaiv	Map	ED #128 on voters register website
129	Mykolaiv Oblast	Whole: Vitovka Raion; Parts of: Mykolaiv	144,433		Ihor Kopytin; Servant of the People since 29 August 2019		Mykolaiv	Map	ED #129 on voters register website
130	Mykolaiv Oblast	Whole: Bashtanka Raion, Bereznehuvate Raion, Kazanka Raion, Novyi Buh Raion, Nova Odesa Raion, Snihurivka Raion	137,483		Ihor Nehulevsky; Servant of the People since 29 August 2019		Bashtanka	Map	ED #130 on voters register website
131	Mykolaiv Oblast	Whole: Voznesensk, Yuzhnoukrainsk, Berezanka Raion, Veselynove Raion, Voznesensk Raion, Domanivka Raion, Yelanets Raion	151,922		Artem Chornomorov; Servant of the People since 29 August 2019		Voznesensk	Map	ED #131 on voters register website
132	Mykolaiv Oblast	Whole: Pervomaisk, Arbuzynka Raion, Bratske Raion, Vradiivka Raion, Kryve Ozero Raion, Pervomaisk Raion	137,543		Maksym Dyrdin; Servant of the People since 29 August 2019		Pervomaisk	Map	ED #132 on voters register website
133	Odesa Oblast	Parts of: Odesa	169,828		Artem Dmytruk; Servant of the People since 29 August 2019		Odesa	Map	ED #133 on voters register website
134	Odesa Oblast	Parts of: Odesa	170,051		Oleh Kolyev; Servant of the People since 29 August 2019		Odesa	Map	ED #134 on voters register website
135	Odesa Oblast	Parts of: Odesa	178,359		Oleksiy Leonov; Servant of the People since 29 August 2019		Odesa	Map	ED #135 on voters register website
136	Odesa Oblast	Parts of: Odesa	177,562		Oleksandr Horenyuk; Servant of the People since 29 August 2019		Odesa	Map	ED #136 on voters register website
137	Odesa Oblast	Whole: Balta, Podilsk, Balta Raion, Kodyma Raion, Okny Raion, Podilsk Raion, Savran Raion	131,629		Oleksiy Honcharenko independent since 29 August 2019		Podilsk	Map	ED #137 on voters register website
138	Odesa Oblast	Whole: Ananiv Raion, Berezivka Raion, Ivanivka Raion, Liubashivka Raion, Mykolaivka Raion, Shyriaieve Raion; Parts of: Lyman Raion	145,386		Stepan Chernyavsky; Servant of the People since 29 August 2019		Shyriaieve	Map	ED #138 on voters register website
139	Odesa Oblast	Whole: Yuzhne, Velyka Mykhailivka Raion, Zakharivka Raion, Rozdilna Raion; Parts of: Odesa, Biliaivka Raion, Lyman Raion	172,033		Ihor Vasylkovsky; Servant of the People since 29 August 2019		Rozdilna	Map	ED #139 on voters register website
140	Odesa Oblast	Whole: Biliaivka, Teplodar, Chornomorsk, Ovidiopol Raion; Parts of: Biliaivka Raion	185,684		Serhiy Koleboshyn; Servant of the People since 29 August 2019		Biliaivka	Map	ED #140 on voters register website
141	Odesa Oblast	Whole: Bilhorod-Dnistrovskyi, Bilhorod-Dnistrovskyi Raion, Tatarbunary Raion; Parts of: Kiliia Raion	151,767		Oleksandr Tkachenko; Servant of the People since 29 August 2019		Tatarbunary	Map	ED #141 on voters register website
142	Odesa Oblast	Whole: Artsyz Raion, Sarata Raion, Tarutyne Raion; Parts of: Bolhrad Raion, Kiliia Raion	153,861		Anton Kisse independent since 12 December 2012		Artsyz	Map	ED #142 on voters register website
143	Odesa Oblast	Whole: Izmail, Izmail Raion, Reni Raion; Parts of: Bolhrad Raion	139,424		Anatoliy Urbansky independent since 29 August 2019		Izmail	Map	ED #143 on voters register website
144	Poltava Oblast	Parts of: Poltava	145,203		Dmytro Nalyotov; Servant of the People since 29 August 2019		Poltava	Map	ED #144 on voters register website
145	Poltava Oblast	Whole: Kotelva Raion, Poltava Raion; Parts of: Poltava	151,504		Andriy Boblyakh; Servant of the People since 29 August 2019		Poltava	Map	ED #145 on voters register website
146	Poltava Oblast	Parts of: Kremenchuk	135,225		Yuriy Shapovalov independent since 12 December 2012		Kremenchuk	Map	ED #146 on voters register website
147	Poltava Oblast	Whole: Myrhorod, Dykanka Raion, Zinkiv Raion, Myrhorod Raion, Reshetylivka Raion, Shyshaky Raion	134,342		Oleh Kulinich independent since 12 December 2012		Myrhorod	Map	ED #147 on voters register website
148	Poltava Oblast	Whole: Lubny, Velyka Bahachka Raion, Orzhytsia Raion, Semenivka Raion, Khorol Raion; Parts of: Lubny Raion	140,659		Anastasiya Lyashenko; Servant of the People since 29 August 2019		Lubny	Map	ED #148 on voters register website
149	Poltava Oblast	Whole: Karlivka Raion, Kobeliaky Raion, Kozelshchyna Raion, Mashivka Raion, Novi Sanzhary Raion, Chutove Raion	137,667		Kostyantyn Kasay; Servant of the People since 29 August 2019		Karlivka	Map	ED #149 on voters register website
150	Poltava Oblast	Whole: Horishni Plavni, Hlobyne Raion, Kremenchuk Raion; Parts of: Kremenchuk	139,973		Oleksiy Movchan; Servant of the People since 29 August 2019		Horishni Plavni	Map	ED #150 on voters register website
151	Poltava Oblast	Whole: Hadiach, Hadiach Raion, Hrebinka Raion, Lokhvytsia Raion, Pyriatyn Raion, Chornukhy Raion; Parts of: Lubny Raion	133,390		Maksym Berezin; Servant of the People since 29 August 2019		Lokhvytsia	Map	ED #151 on voters register website
152	Rivne Oblast	Parts of: Rivne	162,992		Oleksandr Kovalchuk; Servant of the People since 29 August 2019		Rivne	Map	ED #152 on voters register website
153	Rivne Oblast	Whole: Ostroh, Hoshcha Raion, Korets Raion, Ostroh Raion, Rivne Raion; Parts of: Rivne	172,973		Roman Ivanisov; Servant of the People since 29 August 2019		Rivne	Map	ED #153 on voters register website
154	Rivne Oblast	Whole: Dubno, Demydivka Raion, Dubno Raion, Zdolbuniv Raion, Mlyniv Raion, Radyvyliv Raion	172,606		Oleksandr Aliksiychuk; Servant of the People since 29 August 2019		Dubno	Map	ED #154 on voters register website
155	Rivne Oblast	Whole: Varash, Volodymyrets Raion, Dubrovytsia Raion, Zarichne Raion, Rokytne Raion	175,213		Viktor M'yalyk independent since 29 August 2019		Dubrovytsia	Map	ED #155 on voters register website
156	Rivne Oblast	Whole: Berezne Raion, Kostopil Raion, Sarny Raion	169,875		Serhiy Lytvynenko; Servant of the People since 29 August 2019		Sarny	Map	ED #156 on voters register website
157	Sumy Oblast	Parts of: Sumy	169,757		Tetyana Ryabukha; Servant of the People since 29 August 2019		Sumy	Map	ED #157 on voters register website
158	Sumy Oblast	Whole: Bilopillia Raion, Krasnopillia Raion, Sumy Raion; Parts of: Sumy	164,582		Ihor Vasylyev; Servant of the People since 29 August 2019		Bilopillia	Map	ED #158 on voters register website
159	Sumy Oblast	Whole: Hlukhiv, Hlukhiv Raion, Putyvl Raion, Seredyna-Buda Raion, Yampil Raion; Parts of: Krolevets Raion, Konotop Raion, Shostka Raion	131,280		Andrii Derkach independent since 12 December 2012		Hlukhiv	Map	ED #159 on voters register website
160	Sumy Oblast	Whole: Konotop, Shostka; Parts of: Konotop Raion, Krolevets Raion, Shostka Raion	133,724		Ihor Molotok independent since 12 December 2012		Shostka	Map	ED #160 on voters register website
161	Sumy Oblast	Whole: Romny, Buryn Raion, Lypova Dolyna Raion, Nedryhailiv Raion, Romny Raion; Parts of: Konotop Raion	134,392		Maksym Huzenko; Servant of the People since 29 August 2019		Romny	Map	ED #161 on voters register website
162	Sumy Oblast	Whole: Lebedyn, Okhtyrka, Velyka Pysarivka Raion, Lebedyn Raion, Okhtyrka Raion, Trostianets Raion	134,657		Mykola Zadorozhniy; Servant of the People since 29 August 2019		Okhtyrka	Map	ED #162 on voters register website
163	Ternopil Oblast	Parts of: Ternopil	171,833		Andriy Bohdanets; Servant of the People since 29 August 2019		Ternopil	Map	ED #163 on voters register website
164	Ternopil Oblast	Whole: Kremenets, Zbarazh Raion, Lanivtsi Raion, Pidvolochysk Raion, Shumsk Raion; Parts of: Kremenets Raion	164,660		Ihor Vasyliv; Servant of the People since 29 August 2019		Zbarazh	Map	ED #164 on voters register website
165	Ternopil Oblast	Whole: Berezhany, Berezhany Raion, Zboriv Raion, Kozova Raion, Pidhaitsi Raion, Ternopil Raion; Parts of: Ternopil, Kremenets Raion	170,005		Ivan Chaykivsky independent since 29 August 2019		Zboriv	Map	ED #165 on voters register website
166	Ternopil Oblast	Whole: Buchach Raion, Husiatyn Raion, Monastyryska Raion, Terebovlia Raion	161,368		Mykola Lyushniak independent since 27 November 2014		Terebovlia	Map	ED #166 on voters register website
167	Ternopil Oblast	Whole: Chortkiv, Borshchiv Raion, Zalishchyky Raion, Chortkiv Raion	143,873		Volodymyr Hevko; Servant of the People since 29 August 2019		Chortkiv	Map	ED #167 on voters register website
168	Kharkiv Oblast	Parts of: Kharkiv	157,548		Mariya Mezentseva; Servant of the People since 29 August 2019		Kharkiv	Map	ED #168 on voters register website
169	Kharkiv Oblast	Parts of: Kharkiv	156,263		Oleksandr Kunytsky; Servant of the People since 29 August 2019		Kharkiv	Map	ED #169 on voters register website
170	Kharkiv Oblast	Parts of: Kharkiv	151,968		Andriy Odarchenko; Servant of the People since 29 August 2019		Kharkiv	Map	ED #170 on voters register website
171	Kharkiv Oblast	Parts of: Kharkiv	148,555		Viktoriya Kinzburska; Servant of the People since 29 August 2019		Kharkiv	Map	ED #171 on voters register website
172	Kharkiv Oblast	Parts of: Kharkiv	150,911		Yuriy Zdebsky; Servant of the People since 29 August 2019		Kharkiv	Map	ED #172 on voters register website
173	Kharkiv Oblast	Parts of: Kharkiv	142,043		Oleksandr Bakumov; Servant of the People since 29 August 2019		Kharkiv	Map	ED #173 on voters register website
174	Kharkiv Oblast	Parts of: Kharkiv	152,596		Oleksandr Feldman independent since 12 December 2012		Kharkiv	Map	ED #174 on voters register website
175	Kharkiv Oblast	Whole: Liubotyn, Derhachi Raion; Parts of: Kharkiv Raion	142,504		Yevhen Pyvovarov; Servant of the People since 29 August 2019		Derhachi	Map	ED #175 on voters register website
176	Kharkiv Oblast	Whole: Chuhuiv, Velykyi Burluk Raion, Vovchansk Raion, Dvorichna Raion, Pechenihy Raion, Chuhuiv Raion	139,560		Dmytro Shentsev; Opposition Bloc since 12 December 2012		Chuhuiv	Map	ED #176 on voters register website
177	Kharkiv Oblast	Whole: Izium, Kupiansk, Borova Raion, Izium Raion, Kupiansk Raion, Shevchenkove Raion	145,238		Dmytro Lyubota; Servant of the People since 29 August 2019		Kupiansk	Map	ED #177 on voters register website
178	Kharkiv Oblast	Whole: Pervomaiskyi, Balakliia Raion, Barvinkove Raion, Blyzniuky Raion, Pervomaiskyi Raion	133,733		Oleksandr Litvinov; Servant of the People since 29 August 2019		Balakliia	Map	ED #178 on voters register website
179	Kharkiv Oblast	Whole: Lozova, Zachepylivka Raion, Kehychivka Raion, Krasnohrad Raion, Lozova Raion, Sakhnovshchyna Raion	147,573		Oleksiy Kucher; Servant of the People since 29 August 2019		Krasnohrad	Map	ED #179 on voters register website
180	Kharkiv Oblast	Whole: Bohodukhiv Raion, Valky Raion, Zolochiv Raion, Kolomak Raion, Krasnokutsk Raion, Nova Vodolaha Raion; Parts of: Kharkiv Raion	135,857		Oleksiy Krasov; Servant of the People since 29 August 2019		Zolochiv	Map	ED #180 on voters register website
181	Kharkiv Oblast	Whole: Zmiiv Raion; Parts of: Kharkiv Raion	149,718		Dmytro Mykysha; Servant of the People since 29 August 2019		Zmiiv	Map	ED #181 on voters register website
182	Kherson Oblast	Parts of: Kherson	155,228		Pavlo Pavlish; Servant of the People since 29 August 2019		Kherson	Map	ED #182 on voters register website
183	Kherson Oblast	Whole: Bilozerka Raion; Parts of: Kherson	158,779		Viktoriya Vagnyer; Servant of the People since 29 August 2019		Kherson	Map	ED #183 on voters register website
184	Kherson Oblast	Whole: Nova Kakhovka, Beryslav Raion, Velyka Lepetykha Raion, Velyka Oleksandrivka Raion, Vysokopillia Raion, Hornostaivka Raion, Novovorontsovka Raion	166,296		Ihor Kolykhaiev independent since 29 August 2019		Nova Kakhovka	Map	ED #184 on voters register website
185	Kherson Oblast	Whole: Kakhovka, Verkhniy Rohachyk Raion, Henichesk Raion, Ivanivka Raion, Kakhovka Raion, Nyzhni Sirohozy Raion, Novotroitske Raion; Parts of: Chaplynka Raion	169,361		Volodymyr Ivanov; Servant of the People since 29 August 2019		Kakhovka	Map	ED #185 on voters register website
186	Kherson Oblast	Whole: Hola Prystan, Hola Prystan Raion, Kalanchak Raion, Oleshky Raion, Skadovsk Raion; Parts of: Chaplynka Raion	175,509		Oleksiy Kovalyov; Servant of the People since 29 August 2019		Oleshky	Map	ED #186 on voters register website
187	Khmelnytskyi Oblast	Parts of: Khmelnytskyi	143,776		Mykola Stefanchuk; Servant of the People since 29 August 2019		Khmelnytskyi	Map	ED #187 on voters register website
188	Khmelnytskyi Oblast	Whole: Volochysk Raion, Khmelnytskyi Raion; Parts of: Khmelnytskyi	150,066		Serhiy Labazyuk independent since 12 December 2012		Khmelnytskyi	Map	ED #188 on voters register website
189	Khmelnytskyi Oblast	Whole: Netishyn, Bilohiria Raion, Iziaslav Raion, Krasyliv Raion, Teofipol Raion	142,259		Olena Kopanchuk; Servant of the People since 29 August 2019		Krasyliv	Map	ED #189 on voters register website
190	Khmelnytskyi Oblast	Whole: Slavuta, Shepetivka, Polonne Raion, Slavuta Raion, Shepetivka Raion	145,513		Oleksii Zhmerenetskyi; Servant of the People since 29 August 2019		Shepetivka	Map	ED #190 on voters register website
191	Khmelnytskyi Oblast	Whole: Starokostiantyniv, Vinkivtsi Raion, Derazhnia Raion, Letychiv Raion, Starokostiantyniv Raion, Stara Syniava Raion	130,144		Viktor Bondar independent since 12 December 2012		Starokostiantyniv	Map	ED #191 on voters register website
192	Khmelnytskyi Oblast	Whole: Horodok Raion, Dunaivtsi Raion, Chemerivtsi Raion, Yarmolyntsi Raion	143,186		Oleksandr Hereha independent since 12 December 2012		Dunaivtsi	Map	ED #192 on voters register website
193	Khmelnytskyi Oblast	Whole: Kamianets-Podilskyi, Kamianets-Podilskyi Raion, Nova Ushytsia Raion	147,233		Ihor Marchuk; Servant of the People since 29 August 2019		Kamianets-Podilskyi	Map	ED #193 on voters register website
194	Cherkasy Oblast	Parts of: Cherkasy	139,737		Lyubov Shpak; Servant of the People since 29 August 2019		Cherkasy	Map	ED #194 on voters register website
195	Cherkasy Oblast	Whole: Drabiv Raion, Chyhyryn Raion, Chornobai Raion; Parts of: Cherkasy	139,724		Oleh Arsenyuk; Servant of the People since 29 August 2019		Cherkasy	Map	ED #195 on voters register website
196	Cherkasy Oblast	Whole: Horodyshche Raion, Katerynopil Raion, Korsun-Shevchenkivskyi Raion, Shpola Raion; Parts of: Kaniv Raion, Lysianka Raion, Talne Raion	140,708		Andriy Strikharsky; Servant of the People since 29 August 2019		Korsun-Shevchenkivskyi	Map	ED #196 on voters register website
197	Cherkasy Oblast	Whole: Zolotonosha, Kaniv, Zolotonosha Raion; Parts of: Cherkasy, Kaniv Raion, Cherkasy Raion	134,484		Oleksandr Skichko; Servant of the People since 29 August 2019		Kaniv	Map	ED #197 on voters register website
198	Cherkasy Oblast	Whole: Smila, Kamianka Raion, Smila Raion; Parts of: Cherkasy Raion	138,029		Serhii Rudyk independent since 2 December 2014		Smila	Map	ED #198 on voters register website
199	Cherkasy Oblast	Whole: Vatutine, Zhashkiv Raion, Zvenyhorodka Raion, Mankivka Raion; Parts of: Lysianka Raion, Talne Raion	134,048		Serhiy Nahornyak; Servant of the People since 29 August 2019		Zhashkiv	Map	ED #199 on voters register website
200	Cherkasy Oblast	Whole: Uman, Monastyryshche Raion, Uman Raion, Khrystynivka Raion; Parts of: Talne Raion	149,190		Anton Yatsenko independent since 12 December 2012		Uman	Map	ED #200 on voters register website
201	Chernivtsi Oblast	Parts of: Chernivtsi	173,747		Olena Lys; Servant of the People since 29 August 2019		Chernivtsi	Map	ED #201 on voters register website
202	Chernivtsi Oblast	Whole: Vyzhnytsia Raion, Kitsman Raion, Putyla Raion; Parts of: Storozhynets Raion	176,178		Maksym Zaremsky; Servant of the People since 29 August 2019		Storozhynets	Map	ED #202 on voters register website
203	Chernivtsi Oblast	Whole: Hertsa Raion, Hlyboka Raion, Novoselytsia Raion; Parts of: Chernivtsi, Storozhynets Raion	175,460		Heorhiy Mazurashu; Servant of the People since 29 August 2019		Novoselitsia	Map	ED #203 on voters register website
204	Chernivtsi Oblast	Whole: Novodnistrovsk, Zastavna Raion, Kelmentsi Raion, Sokyriany Raion, Khotyn Raion	164,762		Valeriy Bozhyk; Servant of the People since 29 August 2019		Khotyn	Map	ED #204 on voters register website
205	Chernihiv Oblast	Parts of: Chernihiv	142,816		Oleh Seminsky; Servant of the People since 29 August 2019		Chernihiv	Map	ED #205 on voters register website
206	Chernihiv Oblast	Whole: Ripky Raion, Chernihiv Raion; Parts of: Chernihiv	141,692		Anton Polyakov; Servant of the People since 29 August 2019		Chernihiv	Map	ED #206 on voters register website
207	Chernihiv Oblast	Whole: Novhorod-Siverskyi, Horodnia Raion, Korop Raion, Koriukivka Raion, Novhorod-Siverskyi Raion, Semenivka Raion, Snovsk Raion, Sosnytsia Raion	129,384		Maksym Zuyev; Servant of the People since 29 August 2019		Koriukivka	Map	ED #207 on voters register website
208	Chernihiv Oblast	Whole: Bakhmach Raion, Borzna Raion, Kulykivka Raion, Mena Raion, Talalaivka Raion; Parts of: Ichnia Raion	130,324		Valeriy Davydenko independent since 27 November 2014		Bakhmach	Map	ED #208 on voters register website
209	Chernihiv Oblast	Whole: Nizhyn, Varva Raion, Nizhyn Raion, Nosivka Raion, Sribne Raion; Parts of: Ichnia Raion	132,498		Valeriy Zub; Servant of the People since 29 August 2019		Nizhyn	Map	ED #209 on voters register website
210	Chernihiv Oblast	Whole: Pryluky, Bobrovytsia Raion, Kozelets Raion, Pryluky Raion	140,298		Borys Prykhodko independent since 29 August 2019		Pryluky	Map	ED #210 on voters register website
211	Kyiv	Whole: Holosiivskyi District	177,477		Oleksandr Yurchenko; Servant of the People since 29 August 2019		Kyiv	Map	ED #211 on voters register website
212	Kyiv	Parts of: Darnytskyi District	189,223		Maksym Perebyjnis; Servant of the People since 29 August 2019		Kyiv	Map	ED #212 on voters register website
213	Kyiv	Parts of: Desnianskyi District	166,448		Artem Dubnov; Servant of the People since 29 August 2019		Kyiv	Map	ED #213 on voters register website
214	Kyiv	Parts of: Dniprovskyi District	164,162		Serhiy Shvets; Servant of the People since 29 August 2019		Kyiv	Map	ED #214 on voters register website
215	Kyiv	Parts of: Desnianskyi District, Dniprovskyi District	159,949		Bohdan Yaremenko; Servant of the People since 29 August 2019		Kyiv	Map	ED #215 on voters register website
216	Kyiv	Parts of: Dniprovskyi District, Darnytskyi District	156,832		Lesya Zaburanna; Servant of the People since 29 August 2019		Kyiv	Map	ED #216 on voters register website
217	Kyiv	Parts of: Obolonskyi District	160,496		Mar'yana Bezuhla; Servant of the People since 29 August 2019		Kyiv	Map	ED #217 on voters register website
218	Kyiv	Parts of: Obolonskyi District, Sviatoshynskyi District	149,919		Dmytro Hurin; Servant of the People since 29 August 2019		Kyiv	Map	ED #218 on voters register website
219	Kyiv	Parts of: Sviatoshynskyi District	161,952		Mykola Tyshchenko; Servant of the People since 29 August 2019		Kyiv	Map	ED #219 on voters register website
220	Kyiv	Whole: Podilskyi District	149,841		Hanna Bondar; Servant of the People since 29 August 2019		Kyiv	Map	ED #220 on voters register website
221	Kyiv	Whole: Pecherskyi District; Parts of: Solomianskyi District, Shevchenkivskyi District	179,797		Anna Purtova; Servant of the People since 29 August 2019		Kyiv	Map	ED #221 on voters register website
222	Kyiv	Parts of: Solomianskyi District	165,470		Roman Hryshchuk; Servant of the People since 29 August 2019		Kyiv	Map	ED #222 on voters register website
223	Kyiv	Parts of: Shevchenkivskyi District	168,831		Lyudmyla Buymister; Servant of the People since 29 August 2019		Kyiv	Map	ED #223 on voters register website
224	Sevastopol	Whole: Balaklava District, Gagarinsky District; Parts of: Lenin District	155,437				Sevastopol	Map	ED #224 on voters register website
225	Sevastopol	Whole: Nakhimov District; Parts of: Lenin District	153,305				Sevastopol	Map	ED #225 on voters register website

== Map ==
Geographical map of electoral districts of Ukraine

== See also ==
- Electoral district
- Elections in Ukraine
- Foreign electoral district of Ukraine

== Links ==
- List of electoral districts of Ukraine by region on the website of the State Voters Register
- List of electoral districts of the 2019 parliamentary election on the website of the Central Election Commission
