= Ukraine's 3rd electoral district =

Ukrainian electoral district

- Electoral district for the Verkhovna Rada
- Region: Autonomous Republic of Crimea
- Population: 160,311

Current Electoral district
- Created: 2012
Party
Vacant

Ukraine's 3rd electoral district is a Verkhovna Rada constituency in the Autonomous Republic of Crimea. Established in its current form in 2012, it contains the city of Dzhankoi and the surrounding regions of Dzhankoi Raion and Krasnohvardiiske Raion. The constituency is home to 160,311 registered voters, and has 164 polling stations. Since the Annexation of Crimea by the Russian Federation in 2014, the seat has been vacant.

== People's Deputies ==
Party	Member	Portrait	Election
Party of Regions	Olena Netetska		2012
Vacant			2014
Vacant			2019

== Elections ==
=== 2012 ===
2012 Ukrainian parliamentary election
Party	Candidate	Votes	%
Party of Regions	Olena Netetska	39,498	50.3%
Independent	Volodymyr Shklyar	16,059	20.5%
KPU	Mykola Havrysh	7,340	9.4%
UDAR	Emine Bahatyrly	7,276	9.3%
Ukrainian Maritime Party	Yuriy Matyushenko	872	1.1%
Greens	Mykola Pyanykh	851	1.1%
Svoboda	Oleksandr Boltyan	815	1.0%
Derzhava	Yakiv Bushkovskyi	766	1.0%
People's	Eduard Fedorov	742	0.9%
Others		4,183	5.3%
Total votes		78,402	100.0%
Party of Regions win (new seat)			

== See also ==
- Electoral districts of Ukraine
- Foreign electoral district of Ukraine
