= Ukraine's 7th electoral district =

Ukrainian electoral district

- Electoral district for the Verkhovna Rada
- Region: Autonomous Republic of Crimea
- Population: 149,101

Current Electoral district
- Created: 2012
Party
Vacant

Ukraine's 7th electoral district is a Verkhovna Rada constituency in the Autonomous Republic of Crimea. Established in its current form in 2012, it includes the cities of Yalta and Alushta, as well as their surrounding metropolitan areas (Yalta Municipality and Alushta Municipality, respectively). The constituency is home to 149,101 registered voters, and has 105 polling stations. Since the Annexation of Crimea by the Russian Federation in 2014, the seat has been vacant.

== People's Deputies ==
Party	Member	Portrait	Election
Party of Regions	Serhii Braiko		2012
Vacant			2014
Vacant			2019

== Elections ==
=== 2012 ===
2012 Ukrainian parliamentary election
Party	Candidate	Votes	%
Party of Regions	Serhiy Brayko	32,366	52.2%
KPU	Viktor Rafalovych	7,800	12.6%
Batkivshchyna	Yuriy Formus	5,877	9.5%
UDAR	Serhiy Khvorov	3,837	6.2%
Independent	Hryhoriy Taranenko	2,267	3.7%
Soyuz	Oleksiy Yakovenko	1,874	3.0%
Ukraine – Forward!	Ihor Romanyuk	1,114	1.8%
Chernobyl Union	Yakiv Krasnenkov	977	1.6%
Greens	Vitaliy Yavorsky	942	1.5%
Party of Greens	Dmytro Chayka	920	1.5%
Others		4,013	6.4%
Total votes		61,987	100.0%
Party of Regions win (new seat)			

== See also ==
- Electoral districts of Ukraine
- Foreign electoral district of Ukraine
