= Foreign electoral district of Ukraine =

Polling stations in embassies, consulates, and military bases abroad

Foreign electoral district
- Закордонний виборчий округ
- Overseas constituency for the Verkhovna Rada
- Region: Overseas

Current constituency
- Created: 2012

The foreign electoral district of Ukraine (Ukrainian: закордонний виборчий округ України, ЗВО) is an electoral district which unites electoral precincts situated outside the territory of Ukraine and which comprises all polling stations located inside embassies and consulates of Ukraine and inside military bases abroad, where there are Ukrainian peacekeeping contingents (Kosovo and DR Congo). The responsibilities of district election commission for the Foreign electoral district are carried out by the Central Election Commission. In this district, only nationwide votings are held, i.e., presidential and parliamentary elections, as well as nationwide referendums. Local elections are not held there.

Polling station on ships under the flag of Ukraine, which are being deployed in the day of voting, and the polling station at Vernadsky Research Base in Antarctica, despite actually being outside the territory of Ukraine, are included into usual electoral districts on the territory of Ukraine. A polling station on a ship is included in the district where its port of registry is located, (Note: CEC Resolution «On the establishment in the electoral district #129, as a special case, of special polling stations on vessels that will be sailing under the State Flag of Ukraine on 25 May 2014, and of the respective polling station commissions» — website of Verkhovna Rada (archive)) and the polling station at the polar station is included in the district #223 (Kyiv, Shevchenkivskyi District) where the headquarters of the National Antarctic Scientific Center of Ukraine are located. (Note: Kyiv — electoral district #223 — website of State voters register)

Among diplomatic missions of Ukraine, there are not only embassies and consulates, but also missions to international organizations and honorary consulates, but there are no polling stations in them. Apart from embassies and consulates, there is a polling station at the Branch office of the Embassy of Ukraine in Argentina, which is located in the city of Santiago, Chile.

Any citizen of Ukraine without a criminal record can apply to be a member of precinct election commission in the Foreign electoral district, with exception to candidates and their representatives, governments officials, including staff of diplomatic missions. (Note: Law of Ukraine «On elections of the President of Ukraine» — Article 24. Formation of precincts election commissions, paragraph 10)

In November 2011 the new version of the Law of Ukraine "On Elections of People's Deputies of Ukraine" was adopted, in which the Foreign electoral district was abolished, and all its polling stations abroad were evenly distributed among electoral districts in the city of Kyiv. However, in April 2012 Constitutional Court of Ukraine recognized this innovation unconstitutional on a basis that adding foreign polling stations to electoral districts in Kyiv impedes the full reflection of the will of voters who live in Kyiv, (Note: Decision of the Constitutional Court of Ukraine on the constitutionality of the provisions of the second part of Article 22 of the Law of Ukraine «On Elections of People's Deputies of Ukraine» — website of Verkhovna Rada (archive)) so later the Foreign electoral district was brought back to the law. (Note: Law of Ukraine «On amendments to some legislative acts of Ukraine to improve laws concerning organization of elections» — website of Verkhovna Rada)

== Number of voters and their turnout ==
As of the day of voting in the first round of 2019 Ukrainian presidential election, there were 552,357 eligible voters (around 1.55% of all eligible voters) in the Foreign electoral district, of them 268 were on the military base in Goma, DR Congo, and 42 on military base in Novo Selo, Kosovo. As of the day of voting of 2019 Ukrainian parliamentary election, there were 102 polling stations in 72 countries of the World, including 5 in Germany, 4 in the United States, Poland and Italy, and 3 in Canada, Spain, Turkey and China. The Consulate-general of Ukraine in Milan is the only place in the Foreign electoral district where there are two polling stations.

The Foreign electoral district differs from usual electoral districts by its pretty low turnout (around 10-15% compared to over 50% on the territory of Ukraine, however voters in countries where there is well organized Ukrainian community show a bit higher turnout), because of enormous areas of voting precincts which make many voters unable to get to the polling station, and even if they do, they have to stand in very long queues to vote. Also, there is an opinion that only a small portion of Ukrainian citizens abroad are included in the lists of voters in Foreign electoral district, due to quite complicated procedure of applying for consular registration and due to many Ukrainians hiding the fact of their staying abroad from Ukrainian authorities. Also, to vote in the Foreign electoral district, a person has to visit an embassy or consulate twice: once to register and once to vote.

== Differences from usual electoral districts ==
The electoral process on the Foreign electoral district differs from that in the electoral districts on the territory of Ukraine in many ways. Among differences there are:

- Electoral districts on the territory of Ukraine were formed in a way that approximately an equal number of voters resided in each of them. At the moment of formation of today's electoral districts in 2012, the average number of voters in each district was 161,140. (Note: CEC Resolution «On the formation of single-mandate electoral districts on a permanent basis within the territories of Autonomous Republic of Crimea, oblasts, cities of Kyiv and Sevastopol» — website of Verkhovna Rada (archive)) Foreign electoral district with its 552,357 voters clearly do not follow this rule.
- During parliamentary elections for the Verkhovna Rada, voters in each electoral district on the territory of Ukraine not only get a ballot with a list of parties elected nationwide, but also get a ballot with a list of candidates to represent their electoral district in the parliament (Ukraine has a mixed system of voting, where 225 MPs are elected via a nationwide list of parties and 225 are elected one from each electoral district). Voters in Foreign electoral district are only given a ballot with a list of parties, allowing them to vote for only the 225 party-list seats. Starting with the Next Ukrainian parliamentary election, all seats will be at-large party-list seats, allowing overseas voters to vote for all seats for the first time.
- Local elections (elections of city, town and village mayors, elections of village, town, city, district and region councils etc.) are not held in the Foreign electoral district.
- The Central Election Commission perform the duties of district election commission in the Foreign electoral district, in particular, appoints members of precinct election commissions, receives protocols of votes count from them and registers the observers. (Note: Law of Ukraine «On elections of the President of Ukraine» — Article 21. System of election commissions, paragraph 3)
- Some role in organizing electoral process in the Foreign electoral district is also played by the Ministry of Foreign Affairs, such as taking part in formation of staff of precinct commissions, (Note: Law of Ukraine «On elections of the President of Ukraine» — Article 24. Formation of precincts election commissions, paragraph 4) maintains the list of voters in the Foreign electoral district, (Note: CEC Resolution «On clarification about preparation and clarification of voter lists for preparing and holding the election of the President of Ukraine»: VII. Assembling and clarifying the voters lists at polling stations abroad — website of Verkhovna Rada (archive)) transfers voting ballots and other voting documentation from Central commission to precinct ones and vice versa. (Note: Law of Ukraine «On elections of the President of Ukraine» — Article 73. The procedure for sending election ballots to election commissions, paragraph 6) (Note: CEC Protocol on the transferring of voting ballots for the Elections of the People's Deputies of Ukraine to electoral commissions of the Foreign electoral district — website of the Central Election Commission (archive))
- Just as on usual polling stations in Ukraine, foreign polling stations are opened for voters from 8 to 20 o'clock, but according to local time, not the time in Ukraine. (Note: Law of Ukraine «On elections of the President of Ukraine» — Article 75. Preparation for voting on the Election Day (Re-vote Day), paragraph 1) The polling station to be opened the earliest is the one at the Embassy of Ukraine in Australia in Canberra. It opens at 23 o'clock of previous day in Ukrainian time. The latest to open is the polling station at the Consulate-general of Ukraine in San Francisco, which opens at 18 o'clock Ukrainian time.
- Unlike the territory of Ukraine, where electoral precincts are never bigger than a hundred square kilometers and in big cities they can be even smaller than a block, in the Foreign electoral district precincts can contain whole countries or sometimes even considerable parts of continents. That creates a lot of trouble for voters abroad.
- In the Foreign electoral district voting at the place of residence (for people who due to health problems are unable to visit a polling station personally) is not carried out because of giant sizes of electoral precincts. (Note: Law of Ukraine «On elections of the President of Ukraine» — Article 77. The procedure for organizing voting at the place of residence, paragraph 18)
- In polling stations abroad voters should present a travel passport, diplomatic passport or service passport to get a ballot, while in polling station in Ukraine voters should present an identity card.
- While citizens of Ukraine who live in Ukraine are added to lists of voters according to their resident registration, citizens abroad are added to the lists according to the data of consular registration.
- In countries where there is a significant number of Ukrainian citizens, e.g. Poland, Germany, Moldova, USA or Canada, lists of voters can be as large as tens of thousands people (with the biggest list belonging to a polling station at the embassy in Chișinău — over 50 thousand voters). Meanwhile, on the territory of Ukraine a list of voters in every polling station never exceeds 2,500 people.

== Abolition of foreign polling station of Ukraine in Russia ==
Foreign electoral precincts of Ukraine to which parts of Russia belong

In 2018 the Central Election Commission, on the submission of the Ministry of Foreign Affairs, decided to close all Ukrainian polling stations on the territory of Russia, namely in the embassy in Moscow and in consulates in Saint-Petersburg, Rostov-na-Donu, Yekaterinburg and Novosibirsk. Voters residing in Russia were moved to the polling stations in neighboring countries. North Caucasian and Southern federal districts of Russia were included into the electoral precinct of the Embassy of Ukraine in Georgia, the rest of European Russia into precinct of Embassy of Ukraine in Finland, Asian Russia into precinct of Embassy of Ukraine in Kazakhstan. That was done due to security reasons. Pavlo Klimkin, then the Minister of foreign affairs, said that there are significant security risks, such as law enforcement, administrative and propaganda pressure on voters and election commissions members, possibility of dangerous provocation, infiltration of special services agents into election commissions, intervention of Russian authorities into elections etc. Minister summarized the position of MFA with such a statement:

We believe that holding free and fair elections on the territory of aggressor state is impossible, devoid of political and legal sense, and for those deciding to participate – just dangerous.

This gave rise to Russian media claiming that 2019 Ukrainian presidential election is illegitimate, with arguments that polling stations on the territory of Russia were abolished, and also that Russian observers were denied permission to observe Ukrainian elections.

This decision was challenged in the Supreme Court of Ukraine in January 2019, but the court recognized it legal.

== Difficulties with voting abroad ==
On 2019 Ukrainian presidential election in Foreign electoral district only 59,830 out of 552,357 registered voters used their right to vote, even when there are approximately 6 million Ukrainian citizens listed in state registers as being abroad. Thus, only about 1% of Ukrainian citizens abroad participate in elections. Many Ukrainians living outside Ukraine hide their being there from the Ukrainian officials, with the biggest reasons being frequent statements by politicians about the possibility of introducing taxation for people working abroad and introducing punishment for dual citizenship, as well as distrust of the Ukrainian authorities in general. Those citizens who do decide to vote must either apply to be included in the list of voters at a polling station abroad or apply to be included in the consular list at a diplomatic establishment of Ukraine, which will also result in inclusion into the list of voters. In both cases, they have to either send the application by mail, together with the Ukrainian passport and the original residence permit, which is deemed risky, or come to the diplomatic establishment in person. The passport of another state as a proof of residence permit in that state is not eligible, since Ukraine does not recognize other citizenships of its citizens. Therefore, citizens of Ukraine who also have a passport of another state can not achieve being added to the voters list, as well as being added the consular list. Attending an embassy or a consulate in person to register for voting or to vote is a problem for many citizens as they often have to travel long distances. For example, a Ukrainian living in Perth has to travel more than 3,000 km to the embassy in Canberra, and a plane ticket across the continent can cost $800 or more. In addition to the financial component, this trip takes one or even several days. This problem is especially acute in countries with few polling stations and large territories or polling stations covering several major countries, such as Brazil, South Africa, Australia, China. During the election day, huge queues appear in front of polling stations in countries where there is a significant presence of Ukrainians, such as Germany, the Czech Republic, the United States, Moldova and Estonia. Due to the low capacity of foreign polling stations, voters have to wait in queue for several hours. Sometimes, it happens that the queue is still there when it is time for the polling station to close, so it has to continue its work for a while. Also, it is often problematic to find people to work in foreign precinct election commissions.

Due to the above-mentioned problems, Ukrainians abroad are actively advocating for electronic voting, at least for foreign voters. Opponents of voting over the Internet say that there will be doubts about the honesty of the votes counting, also there will be no way to make sure that the vote was given freely and personally, that is, what if a person voted under supervision of another person, or even under supervision of the special services of the host country. In addition to that, critics of online voting fear numerous votes from Russia, whose honesty will be questioned. Also, voters living abroad ask to introduce an online consular registration system and allow voting by mail. Along with that, foreign voters are concerned about the lack of polling stations and offer to open them not only at embassies and consulates, but also at honorary consulates of Ukraine or elsewhere. Officials, namely the former Foreign Minister Pavlo Klimkin, point out that the current Ukrainian legislation allows opening polling stations abroad only at embassies and consulates and at military bases, moreover, not all countries would allow opening polling stations outside diplomatic missions. At the same time, Klimkin expressed his full support for the ideas of electronic voting.

== Foreign voting in other countries ==
There are two main approaches in the World to attribute the votes of citizens abroad to a particular constituency: their votes are collected into one (all over the World) or several (each covers a certain part of foreign territory) foreign constituencies, or their votes are somehow attributed to constituencies located in the territory of their nativeland. A single foreign constituency exists in many countries, for example in Bulgaria or in Croatia. Ukrainian voters abroad can not elect majoritarian MPs, unlike many other countries, such as France, Portugal or Croatia. In some countries, there are not one but several foreign constituencies, each covering only a specific part of foreign territories. For example, in Portugal there are two foreign constituencies: one includes countries in Europe, the other all countries outside Europe. In France, there are 11 foreign constituencies, each comprising several European countries or large parts of other continents. Similar "fragmented" foreign constituencies are also found in Italy and Northern Macedonia.

Another approach is to assign votes of citizens abroad to one or more constituencies (usually in the capital) in the territory of their nativeland. This approach was cancelled in Ukraine by the Constitutional Court in 2012 ⇨. This approach is used in the Netherlands, where citizens abroad are assigned to The Hague constituency (the Hague mayor is responsible for registering voters abroad); in Poland, where citizens abroad are counted into 19th constituency in Warsaw; in Belarus, where foreign votes are attributed to the 95th Kupalov district in Minsk, in which the MFA of Belarus is located; and other countries.

As for the voting itself, depending on the country, citizens either have to personally come to the polling station abroad, or they can vote remotely (by mail or online). Some countries, including Norway and Australia, allow voters who will be abroad on election day, but who will be at home shortly beforehand, to vote in advance. Citizens of those countries that allow voting only in the polling station should visit their country's diplomatic establishment to vote. An exception is Moldova, whose voters can arrange polling stations anywhere, even in the shop, under certain conditions. Ukrainian legislation allows voting abroad to be held only in the diplomatic missions of Ukraine.

Many countries of the World, unlike Ukraine, provide voters with the opportunity to register in voters lists and to vote by mail (paper or electronic) or online. For example, in Estonia you can vote online, and in the United States, depending on the state, voters either receive a paper ballot, fill it out, and send it back, or receive a ballot by email or fax, print it, and send it back, or vote via the Internet. Some countries do not even allow citizens abroad to vote. As an example, Israeli citizens can vote only in Israel. Those citizens who are abroad (except diplomats and employees of some government organizations abroad) are not allowed to vote. The same, except for elections to the European Parliament, also applies to Ireland.

In the United Kingdom, citizens living or temporarily residing abroad are allowed to delegate someone else to vote on their behalf. During elections to the European Parliament, a national of one EU member state residing in another EU member state may vote in the country of stay on the same terms as local citizens. For example, an Irish citizen residing in Spain may participate in the elections as a Spanish voter and vote for a party nominated for the EP by Spain.

== Voting results ==
=== Presidential elections ===
2019	second round	(Note: 2019 Ukrainian presidential election: Results of voting in the Foreign electoral district (re-vote on 21.04.2019) — website of the Central Election Commission (archive)) (Note: 2019 Ukrainian presidential election: Results of voting in polling stations abroad (re-vote on 21.04.2019) — website of the Central Election Commission (archive))
2019	first round	(Note: 2019 Ukrainian presidential election: Results of voting in the Foreign electoral district (vote on 31.03.2019) — website of the Central Election Commission (archive)) (Note: 2019 Ukrainian presidential election: Results of voting in polling stations abroad (vote on 31.03.2019) — website of the Central Election Commission (archive))
2014		(Note: 2014 Ukrainian extraordinary presidential election: Results of voting within the Foreign electoral district — website of the Central Election Commission (archive)) (Note: 2014 Ukrainian extraordinary presidential election: CEC protocol on the results of voting within the Foreign electoral district — website of the Central Election Commission)
2010	second round	(Note: 2010 Ukrainian presidential election: Results of voting in the Foreign electoral district (second round) — website of the Central Election Commission)
2010	first round	(Note: 2010 Ukrainian presidential election: Results of voting in the Foreign electoral district (first round) — website of the Central Election Commission (archive))

=== Parliamentary elections ===
In the Foreign electoral district "pro-European" parties have traditionally had more electoral support than "pro-Russian" ones. For example, in the parliamentary elections of 2012, Svoboda won the most votes, overtaking the Party of Regions by one third of a percent, while the Party of Regions was confidently victorious in the territory of Ukraine, gaining three times as many votes as Svoboda. (Note: 2012 Ukrainian parliamentary election: Results of votes counting in the nationwide multi-member constituency — website of the Central Election Commission) Another example is the fact that the Communist Party of Ukraine has always received fewer votes in the foreign district than in Ukraine. In 2014, the Opposition Bloc won the overwhelming majority in electoral districts in eastern Ukraine but won only in one electoral precinct in the Foreign electoral district. (Note: 2012 Ukrainian extraordinary parliamentary election: Results of votes counting in the nationwide multi-member constituency in each electoral district — website of the Central Election Commission)

2019	(Note: 2019 Ukrainian extraordinary parliamentary election: Information about the results of counting of votes in foreign polling stations — website of the Central Election Commission (archive)) (Note: 2019 Ukrainian extraordinary parliamentary election: Results of voting in foreign polling station in nationwide constituency — website of the Central Election Commission (archive))
2014	(Note: 2014 Ukrainian extraordinary parliamentary election: Information about the results of counting of votes in foreign polling stations — website of the Central Election Commission (archive)) (Note: 2014 Ukrainian extraordinary parliamentary election: CEC protocol on the results of voting in the nationwide multi-member constituency within the Foreign electoral district of the elections of People's Deputies of Ukraine — website of the Central Election Commission)
2012	(Note: 2012 Ukrainian parliamentary election: Information about the results of counting of votes in foreign polling stations — website of the Central Election Commission) (Note: 2012 Ukrainian parliamentary election: CEC protocol on the results of voting in the nationwide multi-member constituency in foreign polling stations — website of the Central Election Commission)
2007	(Note: 2007 Ukrainian extraordinary parliamentary election: Information about the results of counting of votes in foreign polling stations — website of the Central Election Commission)
2006	(Note: 2006 Ukrainian parliamentary election: Information about the results of counting of votes in foreign polling stations — website of the Central Election Commission)

== List of polling stations and precincts ==
Polling stations abroad are located in all embassies and consulates of Ukraine abroad, except embassies and consulates in Russia ⇨, embassies in the Vatican, Indonesia, Iraq, Pakistan, Tajikistan, Angola, Ethiopia, Kenya, Nigeria, Senegal, consulate São Paulo, as well as the embassies in Libya and Syria, which because of ongoing military conflicts, are temporarily situated in Tunisia and Lebanon, respectively.

There are also countries that are not part of any foreign electoral precinct: Iceland, Albania, Bhutan, Laos, North Korea, Papua New Guinea, Haiti, many African countries, including Sierra Leone, Guinea-Bissau, The Gambia, Liberia, Ivory Coast, Burkina Faso, Ghana, Togo, Cameroon, Equatorial Guinea, Congo, DR Congo, Chad, Central African Republic, South Sudan, Uganda, Djibouti, Eritrea and Somalia, as well as the numerous Pacific and Caribbean island states.

Polling stations are also located on military bases where there are Ukrainian peacekeeping contingents. Currently, they are the base of Ukrainian peacekeeping forces in Kosovo and the base of the 18th Separate Helicopter Detachment in the DR Congo. Previously, there was also a polling station at the 56th Separate Helicopter Unit of the United Nations Mission in Liberia (polling station #900113). In addition, in the past, there was another polling station at the 18th Helicopter Detachment (polling station #900112) in Bunia in DRC, simultaneously with the station in Goma, which still exists today.

Electoral precincts by number of voters:

The number of electoral precinct	Polling station	City	Territory	Number of voters	Map
900001	Embassy of Ukraine to Australia	Canberra	Australia; New Zealand	1749	Map
900002	Embassy of Ukraine to Austria	Vienna	Austria	2612	Map
900003	Embassy of Ukraine to Azerbaijan	Baku	Azerbaijan	282	Map
900004	Embassy of Ukraine to Algeria	Algiers	Algeria; Mali; Niger / Nigeria; Benin; Gabon	285	Map
900005	Embassy of Ukraine to Argentina	Buenos Aires	Argentina; Paraguay; Uruguay	1070	Map
900006	Embassy of Ukraine to Belgium	Brussels	Belgium; Luxembourg	2298	Map
900007	Embassy of Ukraine to the Republic of Belarus	Minsk	Belarus (central and eastern parts)	7284	Map
900008	Consulate of Ukraine in Brest, Belarus	Brest	Belarus (western part)	4850	Map
900009	Embassy of Ukraine to Bulgaria	Sofia	Bulgaria	2812	Map
900011	Embassy of Ukraine to Brazil	Brasília	Brazil; Bolivia; Guyana; Suriname	133	Map
900012	Embassy of Ukraine to Vietnam	Hanoi	Vietnam	216	Map
900013	Embassy of Ukraine to the United Kingdom	London	United Kingdom (England and Wales)	2950	Map
900014	Consulate of Ukraine in Edinburgh, United Kingdom	Edinburgh	United Kingdom (Scotland and Northern Ireland)	174	Map
900015	Embassy of Ukraine to Armenia	Yerevan	Armenia	403	Map
900016	Embassy of Ukraine to Greece	Athens	Greece (southwest part)	2804	Map
900017	Consulate of Ukraine in Thessaloniki, Greece	Thessaloniki	Greece (northeast)	1060	Map
900018	Embassy of Ukraine to Georgia	Tbilisi	Georgia; Russia (Caucasian part)	8442	Map
900020	Embassy of Ukraine to Denmark	Copenhagen	Denmark	2960	Map
900021	Embassy of Ukraine to Estonia	Tallinn	Estonia	4736	Map
900022	Embassy of Ukraine to Egypt	Cairo	Egypt; Sudan; Comoros; Ethiopia	171	Map
900023	Embassy of Ukraine to Israel	Tel Aviv	Israel; Palestine	13867	Map
900025	Embassy of Ukraine to India	New Delhi	India; Bangladesh; Sri Lanka; Nepal; Maldives	160	Map
900026	Embassy of Ukraine to Iran	Tehran	Iran	228	Map
900027	Embassy of Ukraine to Ireland	Dublin	Ireland	771	Map
900028	Embassy of Ukraine to Spain	Madrid	Spain (rest of the country)	5029	
900029	Consulate General of Ukraine in Barcelona, Spain	Barcelona	Spain (Catalonia and the Valencian Community)	5598	Map
900030	Consulate of Ukraine in Málaga, Spain	Málaga	Spain (Andalusia and Murcia)	2878	Map
900031	Embassy of Ukraine to Italy	Rome	Italy (Central Italy, as well as Abruzzo, Molise and Sardinia); Malta; San Marino	8074	Map
900032	Consulate General of Ukraine in Milan, Italy	Milan	Italy (Northwest Italy excluding Liguria)	6059	Map
900033	Consulate General of Ukraine in Naples, Italy	Naples	Italy (Sicily, as well as Southern Italy excluding Abruzzo and Molise)	5815	Map
900034	Embassy of Ukraine to Jordan	Amman	Jordan; Iraq	714	Map
900035	Embassy of Ukraine to Kazakhstan	Astana	Kazakhstan; Russia (Asian part)	3818	Map
900037	Embassy of Ukraine to Canada	Ottawa	Canada (Quebec and Atlantic Canada)	1358	Map
900038	Consulate General of Ukraine in Toronto, Canada	Toronto	Canada (Ontario, Manitoba, and Nunavut)	5365	Map
900040	Embassy of Ukraine to Kyrgyzstan	Bishkek	Kyrgyzstan	148	Map
900041	Embassy of Ukraine to the People's Republic of China	Beijing	China (except Shanghai, Guangdong and their neighboring provinces; includes the territory of Taiwan, which is not recognized as a country by Ukraine); Mongolia	376	
900042	Consulate General of Ukraine in Shanghai, PRC	Shanghai	China (Shanghai and its neighboring provinces)	484	Map
900043	Embassy of Ukraine to Cyprus	Nicosia	Cyprus (includes the territory of Northern Cyprus, which is not recognized as a country by Ukraine)	612	Map
900044	Embassy of Ukraine to the Republic of Korea	Seoul	South Korea	242	Map
900045	Embassy of Ukraine to Cuba	Havana	Cuba; Venezuela; Dominican Republic; Nicaragua; El Salvador; Honduras	361	Map
900046	Embassy of Ukraine to Kuwait	Kuwait City	Kuwait	173	Map
900047	Embassy of Ukraine to Latvia	Riga	Latvia	2503	Map
900048	Embassy of Ukraine to Lithuania	Vilnius	Lithuania	3163	Map
900049	Embassy of Ukraine to Lebanon	Beirut	Lebanon; Syria	1437	Map
900051	Embassy of Ukraine to Northern Macedonia	Skopje	North Macedonia	81	Map
900052	Embassy of Ukraine to Malaysia	Kuala Lumpur	Malaysia; Timor-Leste; Philippines	103	Map
900053	Embassy of Ukraine to Morocco	Rabat	Morocco; Mauritania; Senegal; Guinea	608	Map
900054	Embassy of Ukraine to Mexico	Mexico City	Mexico; Panama; Guatemala; Costa Rica	257	Map
900055	Embassy of Ukraine to Moldova	Chișinău	Moldova (southern part)	51293	Map
900056	Consulate of Ukraine in Bălți, Moldova	Bălți	Moldova (northern part)	12994	Map
900058	Embassy of Ukraine to the Netherlands	The Hague	Netherlands	1892	Map
900059	Embassy of Ukraine to Germany	Berlin	Germany (Former East Germany)	16953	Map
900061	Consulate General of Ukraine in Hamburg, Germany	Hamburg	Germany (Hamburg, Bremen, Schleswig-Holstein, and Lower Saxony)	14147	Map
900062	Consulate General of Ukraine in Munich, Germany	Munich	Germany (Bavaria and Baden-Württemberg)	25768	Map
900063	Consulate General of Ukraine in Frankfurt, Germany	Frankfurt	Germany (Rhineland-Palatinate, Saarland and Hesse)	13275	Map
900064	Embassy of Ukraine to Norway	Oslo	Norway	583	Map
900065	Embassy of Ukraine to the UAE	Abu Dhabi	United Arab Emirates (emirate of Abu Dhabi); Bahrain	335	Map
900067	Embassy of Ukraine to Peru	Lima	Peru; Ecuador; Colombia	212	Map
900068	Embassy of Ukraine to South Africa	Pretoria	South Africa; Botswana; Zambia; Zimbabwe; Mauritius; Madagascar; Mozambique; Namibia / Lesotho; Eswatini; Kenya; Burundi; Malawi; Rwanda; Tanzania; Angola	345	Map
900069	Embassy of Ukraine to Poland	Warsaw	Poland (central and western parts)	19523	Map
900070	Consulate of Ukraine in Gdańsk, Poland	Gdańsk	Poland (northwest and northern parts)	5306	Map
900071	Consulate General of Ukraine in Kraków, Poland	Kraków	Poland (southwest and southern parts)	12033	Map
900072	Consulate General of Ukraine in Lublin, Poland	Lublin	Poland (eastern part)	4505	Map
900073	Embassy of Ukraine to Portugal	Lisbon	Portugal (southern part)	2855	Map
900074	Consulate of Ukraine in Porto, Portugal	Porto	Portugal (northern part)	883	Map
900080	Embassy of Ukraine to Romania	Bucharest	Romania	338	Map
900082	Embassy of Ukraine to Saudi Arabia	Riyadh	Saudi Arabia; Yemen	102	Map
900083	Embassy of Ukraine to Serbia	Belgrade	Serbia (includes the territory of Kosovo, which is not recognized as a country by Ukraine)	360	Map
900085	Embassy of Ukraine to Singapore	Singapore	Singapore; Brunei; Indonesia	262	Map
900086	Embassy of Ukraine to Slovakia	Bratislava	Slovakia	4185	Map
900088	Embassy of Ukraine to Slovenia	Ljubljana	Slovenia	720	Map
900089	Embassy of Ukraine to the USA	Washington, D.C.	United States (Southern Census Region, as well as Ohio and Missouri); Antigua and Barbuda	7313	Map
900090	Consulate General of Ukraine in New York City, USA	New York City	United States (Northeastern Census Region)	12080	Map
900091	Consulate General of Ukraine in San Francisco, USA	San Francisco	United States (Western Census Region)	23730	Map
900092	Consulate General of Ukraine in Chicago, USA	Chicago	United States (Midwestern Census Region excluding Ohio and Missouri)	5908	Map
900093	Embassy of Ukraine to Thailand	Bangkok	Thailand; Myanmar; Laos	192	Map
900094	Embassy of Ukraine to Tunisia	Tunis	Tunisia; Libya	360	Map
900095	Embassy of Ukraine to Turkey	Ankara	Turkey (rest of the country)	219	Map
900096	Consulate General of Ukraine in Istanbul, Turkey	Istanbul	Turkey (Marmara region plus İzmir, Aydın and Manisa Provinces)	366	Map
900097	Embassy of Ukraine to Turkmenistan	Ashgabat	Turkmenistan; Afghanistan	206	Map
900098	Embassy of Ukraine to Hungary	Budapest	Hungary (central and western parts)	2521	Map
900099	Consulate of Ukraine in Nyíregyháza, Hungary	Nyíregyháza	Hungary (eastern part)	4152	Map
900100	Embassy of Ukraine to Uzbekistan	Tashkent	Uzbekistan; Tajikistan	1233	Map
900101	Embassy of Ukraine to Finland	Helsinki	Finland; Russia (European part except Caucasus)	20484	Map
900102	Cultural and Information Center of the Embassy of Ukraine to France	Paris	France; Monaco	3705	Map
900104	Embassy of Ukraine to Croatia	Zagreb	Croatia; Bosnia and Herzegovina	326	Map
900105	Embassy of Ukraine to the Czech Republic	Prague	Czech Republic (western part)	24113	Map
900106	Consulate of Ukraine in Brno, Czech Republic	Brno	Czech Republic (eastern part)	5451	Map
900107	Embassy of Ukraine to Montenegro	Podgorica	Montenegro	338	Map
900108	Embassy of Ukraine to Switzerland	Bern	Switzerland; Liechtenstein	1388	Map
900109	Embassy of Ukraine to Sweden	Stockholm	Sweden	920	Map
900110	Embassy of Ukraine to Japan	Tokyo	Japan	533	Map
900111	Military base in Goma, DR Congo	Goma	military base	268	Map
900114	Military base in Novo Selo, Serbia	Novo Selo	military base	40	
900116	Consulate of Ukraine in Dubai, UAE	Dubai	United Arab Emirates (except emirate of Abu Dhabi); Pakistan; Oman	1225	Map
900120	Embassy of Ukraine to Qatar	Doha	Qatar	175	Map
900121	Consulate General of Ukraine in Milan, Italy	Milan	Italy (Northeast Italy and Liguria)	4539	Map
900122	Consulate General of Ukraine in Düsseldorf, Germany	Düsseldorf	Germany (North Rhine-Westphalia)	21288	Map
900123	Division of the Embassy of Ukraine to Argentina in Chile	Santiago	Chile	106	Map
900124	Consulate of Ukraine in Antalya, Turkey	Antalya	Turkey (Antalya, Muğla, Burdur, Adana, Karaman, and Mersin Provinces)	324	Map
900125	Consulate General of Ukraine in Edmonton, Canada	Edmonton	Canada (Saskatchewan, Alberta, British Columbia, the Northwest Territory, and Yukon)	1044	Map
900126	Consulate General of Ukraine in Guangzhou, PRC	Guangzhou	China (Guangdong and its neighboring provinces)	62	Map

Territories of electoral precincts of Ukraine in Germany

Territories of electoral precincts of Ukraine in Poland

Territories of electoral precincts of Ukraine in the USA

Territories of electoral precincts of Ukraine in Canada

Territories of electoral precincts of Ukraine in Italy

Territories of electoral precincts of Ukraine in Spain

Territories of electoral precincts of Ukraine in Turkey

Territories of electoral precincts of Ukraine in China

== Map ==
Polling stations at:

Embassies
Consulates
Divisions of embassies
Military bases

== See also ==
- Electoral districts of Ukraine
- Ukrainian diaspora
- Central Election Commission (Ukraine)
- Ministry of Foreign Affairs (Ukraine)
- List of diplomatic missions of Ukraine
- Elections in Ukraine
- Election commission
