= Sevastopol constituency =

Russian legislative constituency

Sevastopol single-member constituency
- Constituency of the Russian State Duma

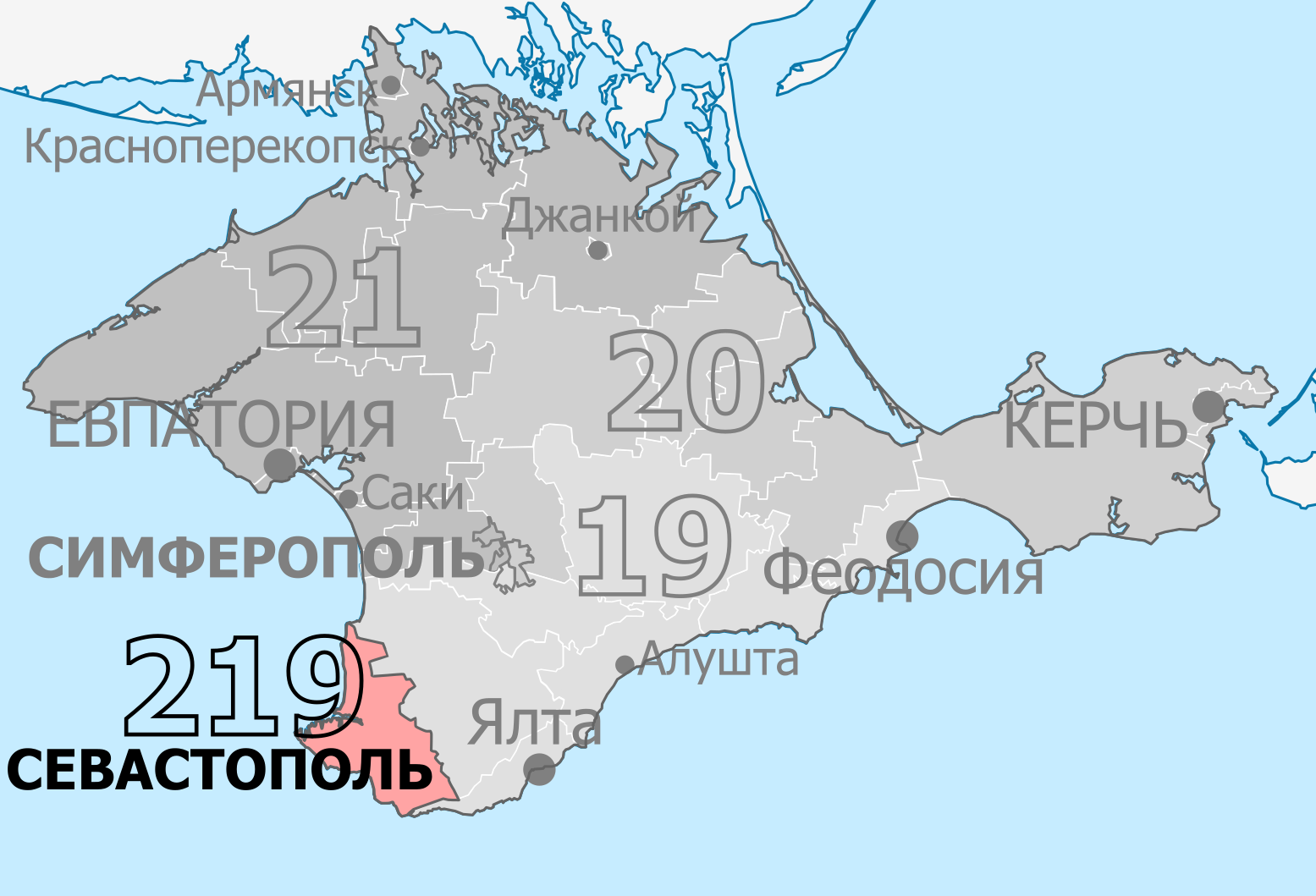
- Deputy: Tatyana Lobach; United Russia
- Federal subject: Sevastopol
- Districts: Balaklavsky, Gagarinsky, Leninsky, Nakhimovsky
- Voters: 362,468 (2026)

The Sevastopol constituency (No.219) is a Russian legislative constituency in Sevastopol. The constituency encompasses the entire territory of Sevastopol.

The constituency has been represented since 2021 by United Russia deputy Tatyana Lobach, former Deputy Chairwoman of the Legislative Assembly of Sevastopol, who won the open seat, succeeding one-term United Russia incumbent Dmitry Belik after the latter successfully sought re-election only through party-list proportional representation.

As Sevastopol was annexed by Russia in March 2014, the constituency was created for the 2016 legislative election.

The constituency's territory corresponds to electoral distritcs No. 224 and 225 (in whole) in the Verkhovna Rada of Ukraine.

== Boundaries ==
2016–present: Balaklavsky District, Gagarinsky District, Leninsky District, Nakhimovsky District
The constituency was created for the first time for the 2016 election. This seat has been covering the entirety of Sevastopol since its initial creation.

== Members elected ==
Election	Member	Party
2016	Dmitry Belik	United Russia
2021	Tatyana Lobach	United Russia
2026	Tatyana Lobach	United Russia

== Election results ==
=== 2016 ===
Summary of the 18 September 2016 Russian legislative election in the Sevastopol constituency
Candidate	Party	Votes	%
Dmitry Belik	United Russia	46,960	33.24%
Oleg Nikolayev	Party of Growth	33,791	23.92%
Vladimir Komoyedov	Communist Party	24,504	17.35%
Ilya Zhuravlyov	Liberal Democratic Party	14,443	10.22%
Mikhail Bryachak	A Just Russia	6,817	4.83%
Andrey Brezhnev	Rodina	2,737	1.94%
Ivan Yermakov	Patriots of Russia	2,589	1.83%
Mikhail Tretyakov	Communists of Russia	2,554	1.81%
Nikita Shtykov	The Greens	1,831	1.30%
Total		141,267	100%

=== 2021 ===
Summary of the 17-19 September 2021 Russian legislative election in the Sevastopol constituency
Candidate	Party	Votes	%	±
Tatyana Lobach	United Russia	85,359	53.37%	▲20.13%
Vladimir Brakovenko	Communist Party	19,262	12.04%	▼5.31%
Ilya Zhuravlyov	Liberal Democratic Party	18,490	11.56%	▲1.34%
Vladimir Yatsenko	A Just Russia — For Truth	11,482	7.18%	▲2.35%
Aleksey Savvateyev	New People	9,468	5.92%	New
Aleksandr Kubryakov	The Greens	6,807	4.26%	▲2.96%
Andrey Reutsky	Party of Pensioners	4,246	2.72%	New
Rejected ballots		4,734	2.96%	▼0.61%
Turnout		159,948	47.38%	

=== 2026 ===
Summary of the 18-20 September 2026 Russian legislative election in the Sevastopol constituency
Candidate	Party	Votes	%
Tatyana Lobach (incumbent)	United Russia	136,676	61.22%
Vladimir Brakovenko	Communist Party	26,686	11.95%
Artyom Gordiyenko	Liberal Democratic Party	20,202	9.05%
Sergey Barybin	New People	19,947	8.93%
Ksenia Kiseleva	A Just Russia	16,549	7.41%
Total		223,264	100%
