= Administrative and municipal divisions of Sevastopol =

Municipal government of Sevastopol

Sevastopol is a city on the Black Sea, located in the southwest of the Crimean Peninsula—a territory disputed between Russia and Ukraine as a result of the annexation of Crimea by the Russian Federation. It has been under the de facto Russian control since March 2014, when it was incorporated into Russia as one of its federal subjects, with a status of a federal city. Being a disputed territory, Sevastopol has two sets of laws governing how its administrative and municipal divisions are set up. Under both Ukrainian and Russian laws, the city is administratively divided into four districts.

Districts of Sevastopol: Gagarin District Lenin District Nakhimov District Balaklava District

Under the Ukrainian laws, the districts have both administrative and municipal status, while under the Russian laws the districts are purely administrative and have no further divisions. Within the Russian municipal framework, however, the territory of the federal city of Sevastopol is divided into nine municipal okrugs and the city of Inkerman. While individual municipal divisions are contained within the borders of the administrative districts, they are not otherwise related to the administrative districts. The borders of the municipal okrugs are unchanged from the borders of the municipalities which exist under the Ukrainian law.

== Divisions under the Ukrainian law ==
Sevastopol is divided into four urban districts (also known as raions):

Raion	Area (in km^{2}, before 2023)	Population 2014	Density (per km^{2})
Haharinskyi District	61,1	123,768	2025,7
Leninskyi District	26,0	110,132	4235,8
Nakhimovskyi District	231.5	105,149	454,2
Balaklava Raion	544,9	44,991	82,6

All settlements in Sevastopol are organized within the urban districts. Most of the city's urban areas are located within the Leninskyi and Haharinskyi districts, with the Leninskyi District housing the city administration. The former Balaklava settlement, at the southern portion of Sevastopol, is part of the Balaklavskyi District; a raion that contains 29 rural settlements which in turn comprise several villages. The Chersonesus Taurica reserve with archaeological site and museum is located in the Haharinskyi District.

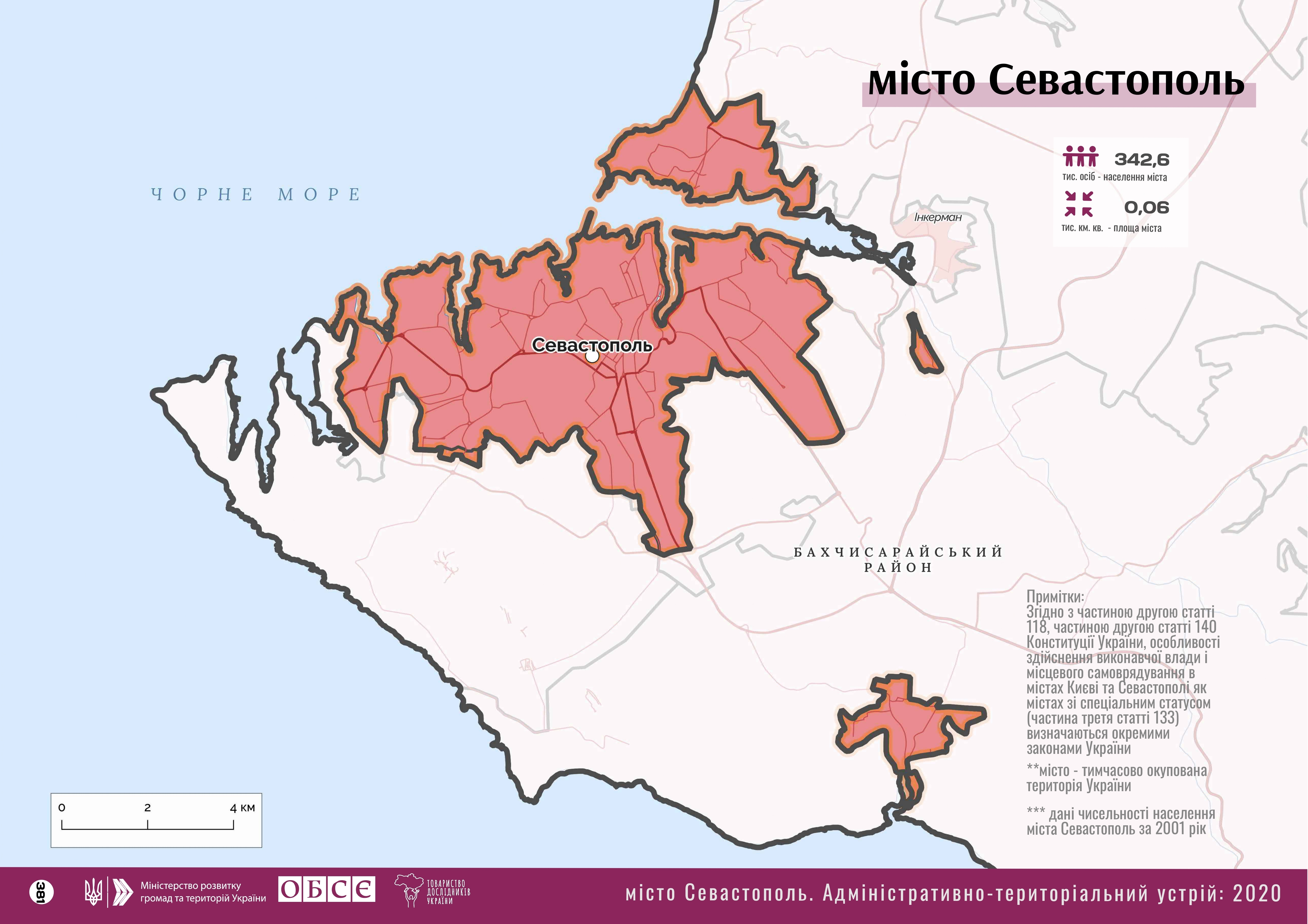
Area of Sevastopol after the 2023 reform

The districts covered areas outside of Sevastopol proper, namely 28 villages surrounding the city and more than 30 unincorporated settlements, as well as the city of Inkerman and the rural settlement of Kacha, until Ukraine de jure merged these regions into Bakhchysarai Raion of the Autonomous Republic of Crimea in 2023, thus excluding them from Sevastopol's boundaries. The composition of each urban district prior to the 2023 reform is as follows:

Haharinskyi District

Western part of the city. Includes: Chersonesus; bays: Kozacha, Komysheva, Omeha, Striletska, Karantynna; gullies: Yukharyna, Maiachna, and others.

Leninskyi District

Central part of the city. Includes: Karantynna Bay on the west, Sarandinakina Gully and Pivdenna Bay on the east coast of Sevastopol Bay—in the north and the border areas of Balaklavskyi and Gagarinskyi districts—in the south.

Nakhimovskyi District

Northern part of city, north side, and the territory north of the Belbek River. The region includes the North and the Ship side of Sevastopol, as well as rural area, with the following populated places (in brackets are the historical placenames prior to renamings of the 1940s):

Kacha Village Council:
- Kacha
- Vyshneve (Eski-Eli)
- Orlivka (Mamashai)
- Osypenko
- Poliushko
Andriivka Village Council:
- Andriivka (Akleiz)
- Soniachnyi
Verkhnosadove Village Council:
- Verkhnosadove
- Dalnie (Eski-Kamyshly)
- Kamyshly
- Pyrohovka (Adzhykoi)
- Povorotne
- Frontove (Otarkoi)
- Fruktove (Belbek)

Balaklavskyi District

South-eastern part of the city, including the southernmost point of Ukraine – Cape Sarych.

There were 34 settlements in the territory of the Balaklavskyi District (in brackets are the historical placenames prior to renamings of the 1940s):

Inkerman City Council
Orlyne Village Council:
- Orlyne (Baidar)
- Honcharne (Varnautka)
- Kyzylove
- Uzundzhy
- Novobobrivske (Baha)
- Ozerne
- Pavlivka (Sakhtik)
- Peredove (Urkusta)
- Pidhirne (Kalendo)
- Rezervne (Kiuchiuk-Muskomiia)
- Rodnykivske (Skielie)
- Rozsoshanka (Savatka)
- Tylove (Khaito)
- Shyroke (Biuiuk-Muskomiia)
Ternivskyi village council:
- Ternivka (Shula)
- Ridne (Uppa)

== Divisions under the Russian law ==
Under the Russian law, the only administrative divisions of the federal city of Sevastopol are the districts, which are the same four districts used under the Ukrainian laws. Within the Russian municipal framework, however, the territory of the federal city of Sevastopol is divided into nine municipal okrugs and the city of Inkerman. While individual municipal divisions are contained within the borders of the administrative districts as to not create difficulties between various levels of governance, they are not otherwise related to those administrative districts. In 2019, Russia has granted Balaklava city status.

=== List of municipal formations ===
Municipal formations within Balaklavsky District

- Balaklavsky Municipal Okrug
- Orlinovsky Municipal Okrug
- Ternovsky Municipal Okrug
- City of Inkerman

Municipal formations within Gagarinsky District

- Gagarinsky Municipal Okrug

Municipal formations within Leninsky District

- Leninsky Municipal Okrug

Municipal formations within Nakhimovsky District

- Andreyevsky Municipal Okrug
- Kachinsky Municipal Okrug
- Nakhimovsky Municipal Okrug
- Verkhnesadovsky Municipal Okrug
