= Gagarin (disambiguation) =

Yuri Gagarin (1934–1968) was the first human to travel in outer space.

Gagarin or Yuri Gagarin may also refer to:

== People ==
- Gagarin family, Rurikid princely family
- Gagarin (surname), people with surname Gagarin/Gagarina
- Gagarin Nathaniel, Indonesian competitive swimmer

== Places ==
- Gagarin, Russia a list of inhabited localities in Russia
- Gagarin, Armenia, a town in Armenia
- Gagarin Mountains, Antarctica
- Gagarin, Uzbekistan, a town in Jizzakh Province, Uzbekistan
- Gagarin's Start is a launch site at Baikonur Cosmodrome
- Orenburg Gagarin Airport, Russia
- Saratov Gagarin Airport, Russia
- Yuri Gagarin Airport, Moçâmedes, Angola
- Yuri Gagarin Secondary School
- Yuri Gagarin Stadium, Bulgaria
- Yuri Gagarin Street, Belgrade
- Yuri Gagarin Street, Warsaw

== Titles ==
- Gagarin: First in Space, a 2013 film
- "Gagarin", a 2015 song by Public Service Broadcasting from The Race for Space
- "Gagarin", a 2020 song by Moses Sumney from Græ

== Other uses ==
- Gagarin (crater), a far-side lunar crater, named after Yuri Gagarin
- 1772 Gagarin, an asteroid, named after Yuri Gagarin
- Kosmonavt Yuri Gagarin, a Soviet satellite tracking ship
- Gagarin Cup, a Kontinental Hockey League trophy

== See also ==
- Gagarine
- Gagarinsky (disambiguation)
