= Gagarinsky =

Gagarinsky (masculine), Gagarinskaya (feminine), or Gagarinskoye (neuter) may refer to:

- Gagarinsky District, name of several districts in Russia
- Gagarinskoye Municipal Okrug, a municipal okrug of Moskovsky District of Saint Petersburg, Russia
- Gagarinskoye Urban Settlement, an administrative division and a municipal formation which the town of Gagarin and one rural locality in Gagarinsky District of Smolensk Oblast, Russia are incorporated as
- Gagarinsky (inhabited locality) (Gagarinskaya, Gagarinskoye), several rural localities in Russia
- Gagarinskaya metro station, several metro stations in Russia

== See also ==
- Gagarin (disambiguation)
