= Lenin District, Sevastopol =

Coordinates: 44.5858°N 33.5100°E

Leninskyi District Ukrainian: Ленінський район Russian: Ленинский район Crimean Tatar: Lenin rayonı
- Urban district in Sevastopol
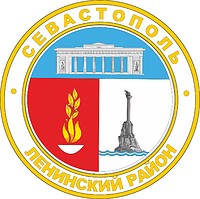
- Coat of arms
- Map of Sevastopol and its raions with Lenin highlighted in red.
- Country: Disputed: Ukraine (de jure); Russia (de facto)
- Municipality: Sevastopol

Area
  - Total: 26 km^{2} (10 sq mi)

Population
  - Total: 106,882
  - Density: 4,240/km^{2} (11,000/sq mi)
- Time zone: UTC+4 (MSK)
- Website: www.lenraion.gov.ua

Leninskyi District (Ukrainian: Ленінський район) or Leninskiy District (Russian: Ленинский район, Crimean Tatar: Lenin rayonı) is an urban district of the city of Sevastopol. Population: 106,882 (2014 Census).

It is the heart of Sevastopol and until 1961 was called Stalin Raion (Сталінський район). The raion contains the city's central square—Nakhimov Square. In 1783 from here takes its origin the city of Sevastopol. The current borders of the raion were confirmed by the municipality in February 1977. To the west it borders Haharinskyi District, to the south - Balaklavskyi District, to the east—Nakhimovskyi District, and to the north its banks are washed by the waters of Sevastopol Bay. It is named after Vladimir Lenin.
