= Tatiana Lobach =

Russian politician

Tatiana Lobach MP
- Татьяна Лобач
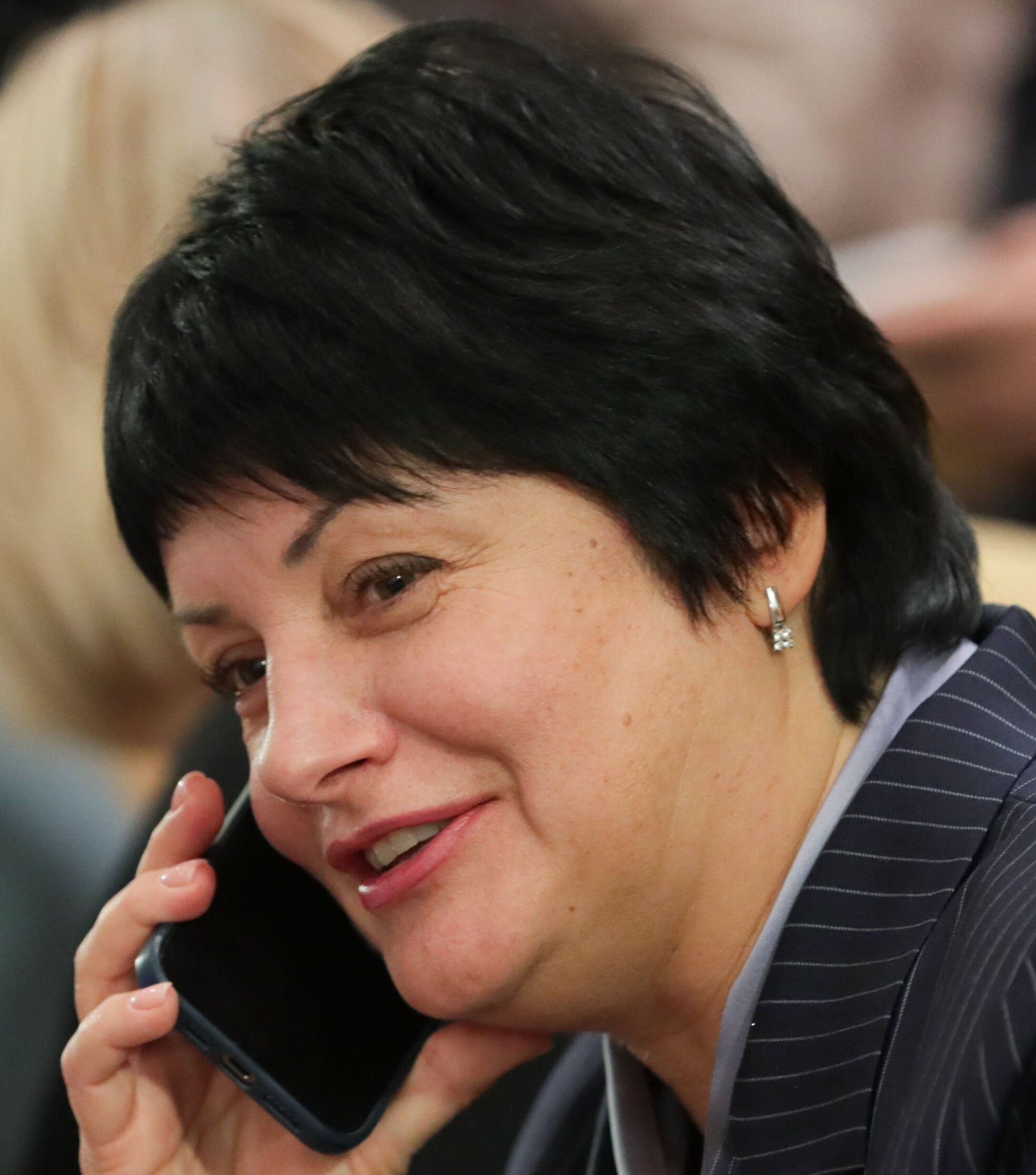
- Lobach in 2022

Member of the State Duma
- Incumbent
- Assumed office 12 October 2021
- Preceded by: Dmitry Belik
- Constituency: Sevastopol (No. 219)

Personal details
- Born: 8 January 1974 (age 52) Khmelnytskyi, Ukrainian SSR, Soviet Union
- Party: United Russia; Party of Regions (until 2014)
- Education: Chernivtsi State University; RANEPA

Tatiana Georgievna Lobach (Russian: Татьяна Георгиевна Лобач; born January 8, 1974, Khmelnytskyi, Ukraine) is a Russian politician serving as a deputy of the State Duma.

At the beginning of the 2000s, Lobach was elected deputy of the Balaklava District in the Council of the city of Sevastopol of the 4th and 5th convocations. In 2010–2011, Lobach worked as deputy chairman of the Balaklava regional state administration for economic issues. In September 2019, Lobach was elected deputy of the Legislative Assembly of Sevastopol. Since September 2021, she has served as deputy of the 8th State Duma.

== Sanctions ==
She was sanctioned by the UK government in 2022 in relation to the Russo-Ukrainian War.
