= Gagarinskaya metro station =

Gagarinskaya metro station may refer to:

- Gagarinskaya (Novosibirsk Metro), a station of the Novosibirsk Metro, Novosibirsk, Russia
- Gagarinskaya (Samara Metro), a station of the Samara Metro, Samara, Russia

== See also ==
- Gagarinsky (disambiguation)
