= Gagarinsky District =

Location of the federal city of Moscow in Russia

Location of Smolensk Oblast in Russia

Location of the federal city of Sevastopol on the Crimean Peninsula

Gagarinsky District is the name of several administrative and municipal districts in Russia.

- Gagarinsky District, Moscow, a district in South-Western Administrative Okrug of the federal city of Moscow
- Gagarinsky District, Smolensk Oblast, an administrative and municipal district of Smolensk Oblast
- Gagarinsky District, Sevastopol, an administrative district of the federal city of Sevastopol (located on the Crimean Peninsula, which is disputed between Russia and Ukraine)

== See also ==
- Gagarinsky (disambiguation)
- Gagarinskoye Municipal Okrug, a municipal okrug of Moskovsky District of Saint Petersburg, Russia
