= Jurija Gagarina Street, Warsaw =

Street in Warsaw, Poland

Coordinates: 52°12′24″N 21°02′24″E

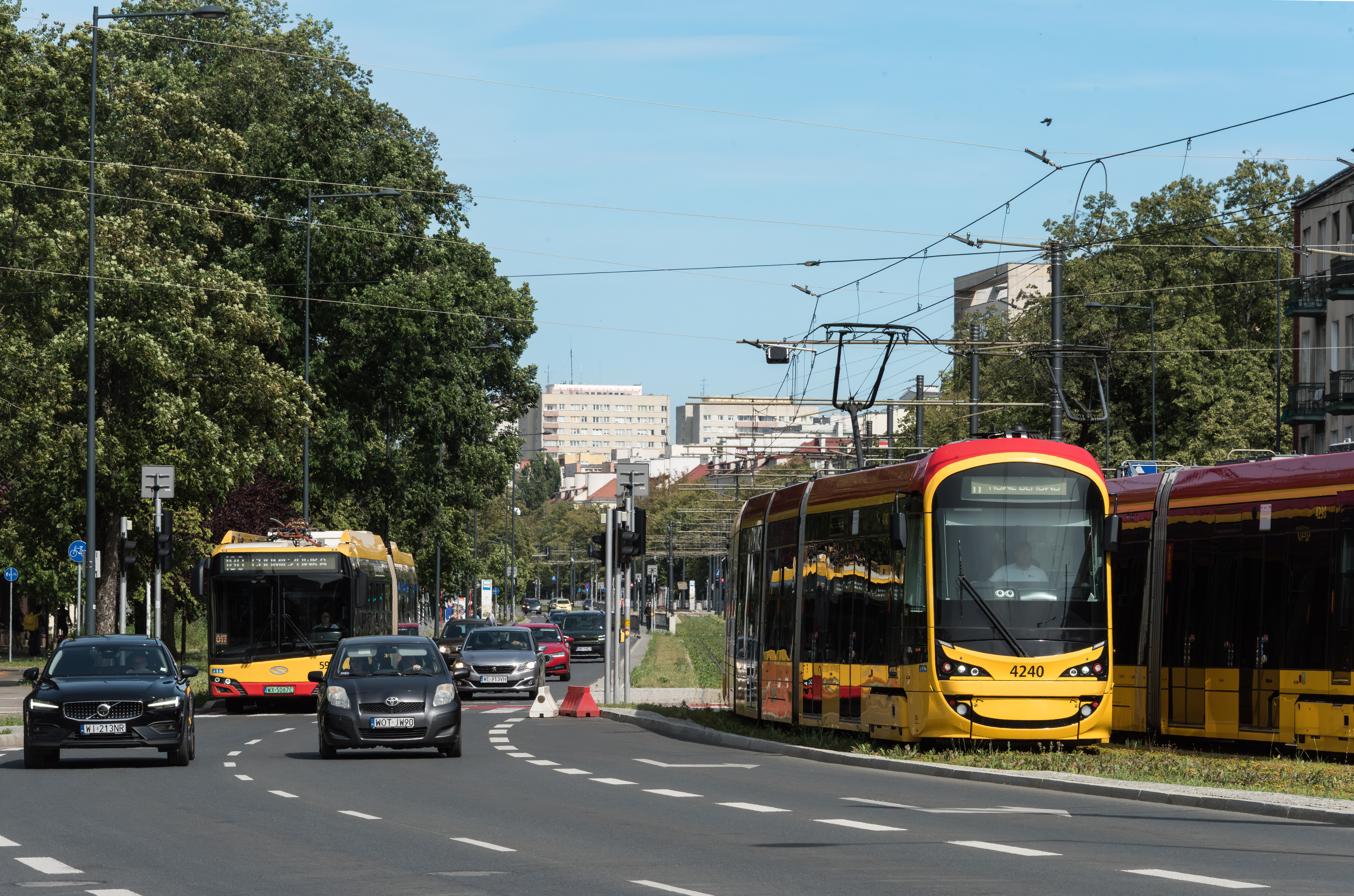
Yuri Gagarin Street in Warsaw

Yuri Gagarin Street (ulica Jurija Gagarina) is a major street in the Mokotów district of Warsaw, named after the first man in space.

Yuri Gagarin Street was established around 1957 as Nowoparkowa Street. It was established in the place of the streets of the former Sielce settlement, laid out at the turn of the 19th and 20th centuries. At the same time, a tram track was built on which trams 16, 33 and 33 "BIS" ran. In June 1961 the street was given the name of Yuri Gagarin.

During the 1939–45 German occupation, in building no. 33 (at that time ul. Podchorążych 101), there was a tobacco shop run by the writer Zofia Nałkowska and her sister, the sculptor, Hanna Nałkowska

Nowadays various residential buildings and offices are located at the street, including the Embassy of Austria.
