= Gagarin, Armenia =

Village in Gegharkunik, Armenia

Gagarin Գագարին
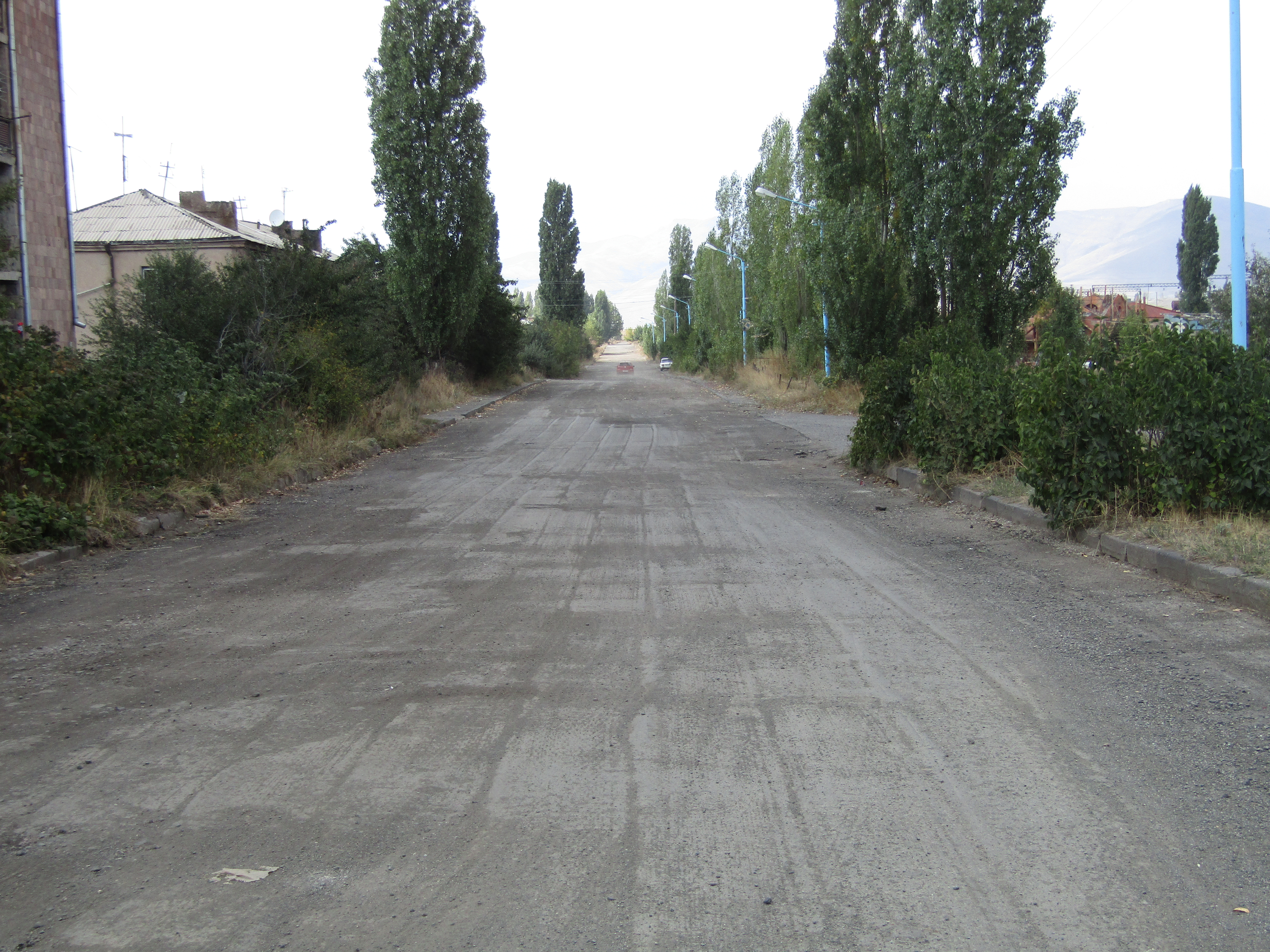
- Main road in Gagarin

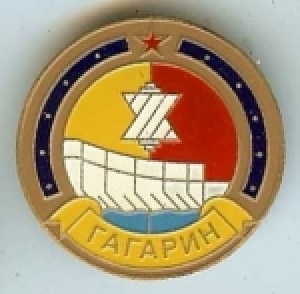
- Coat of arms

- Location within Armenia Location within Gegharkunik
- Coordinates: 40°32′13″N 44°51′28″E
- Country: Armenia
- Province: Gegharkunik
- Municipality: Sevan
- Founded: 1955

Population (2011)
  - Total: 1,379
- Time zone: UTC+4 (AMT)

Gagarin (Armenian: Գագարին) is a village in the Sevan Municipality of the Gegharkunik Province of Armenia. It was founded in 1955 and named after the cosmonaut Yuri Gagarin. Administratively, the village is under the subordination of the Sevan municipality.

== Gallery ==
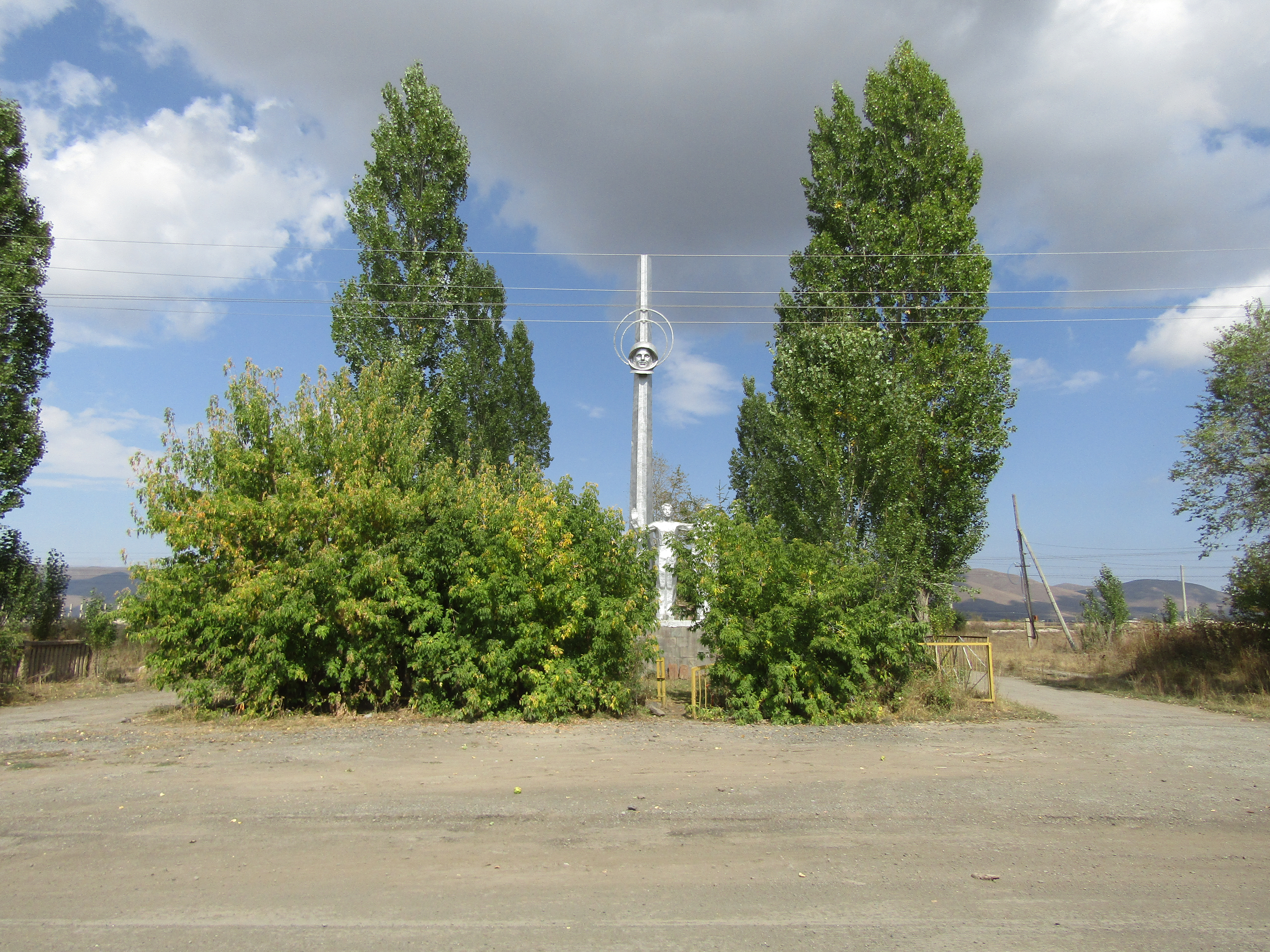
Yuri Gagarin's monument

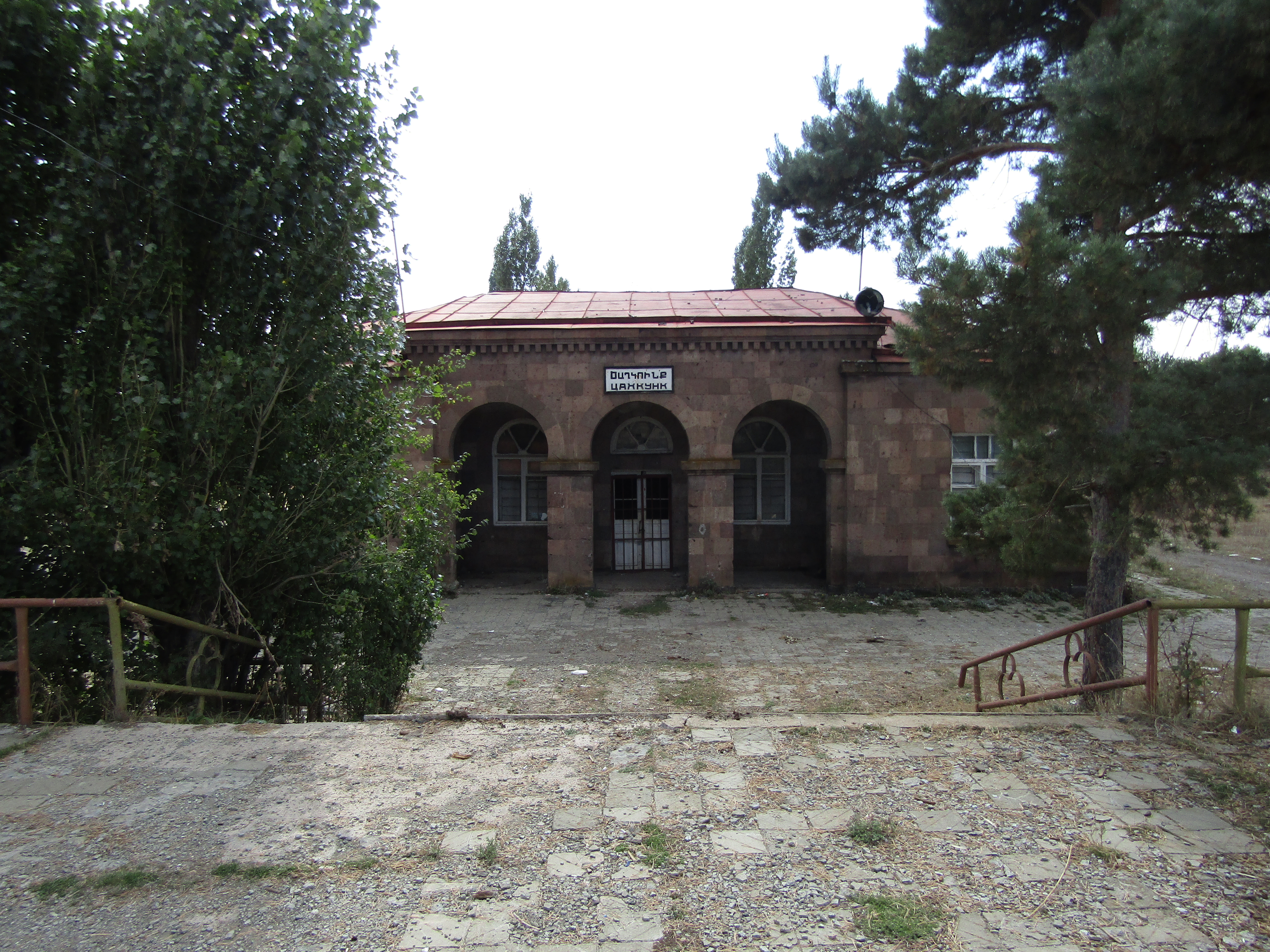
Gagarin train station

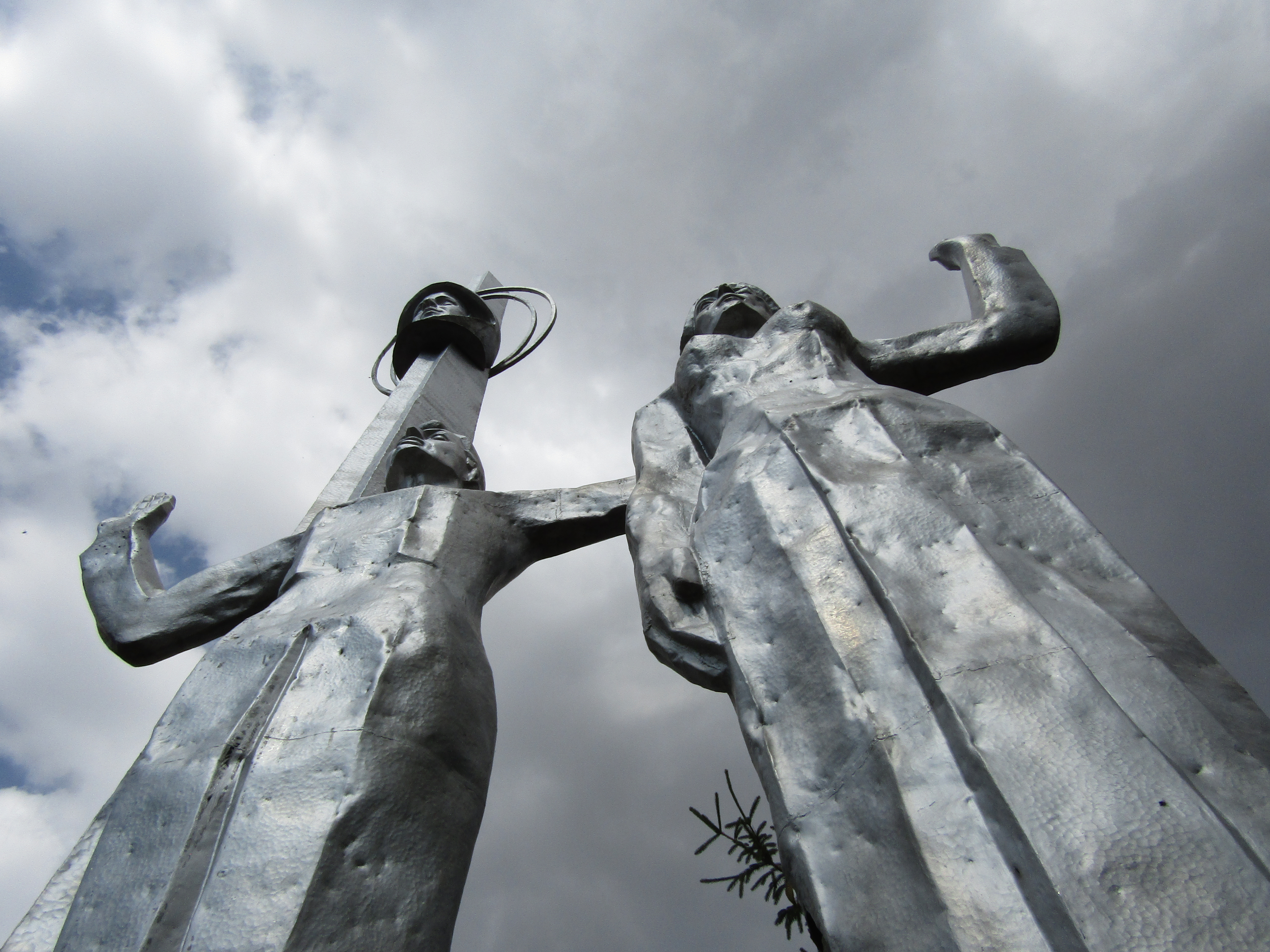
Yuri Gagarin's monument

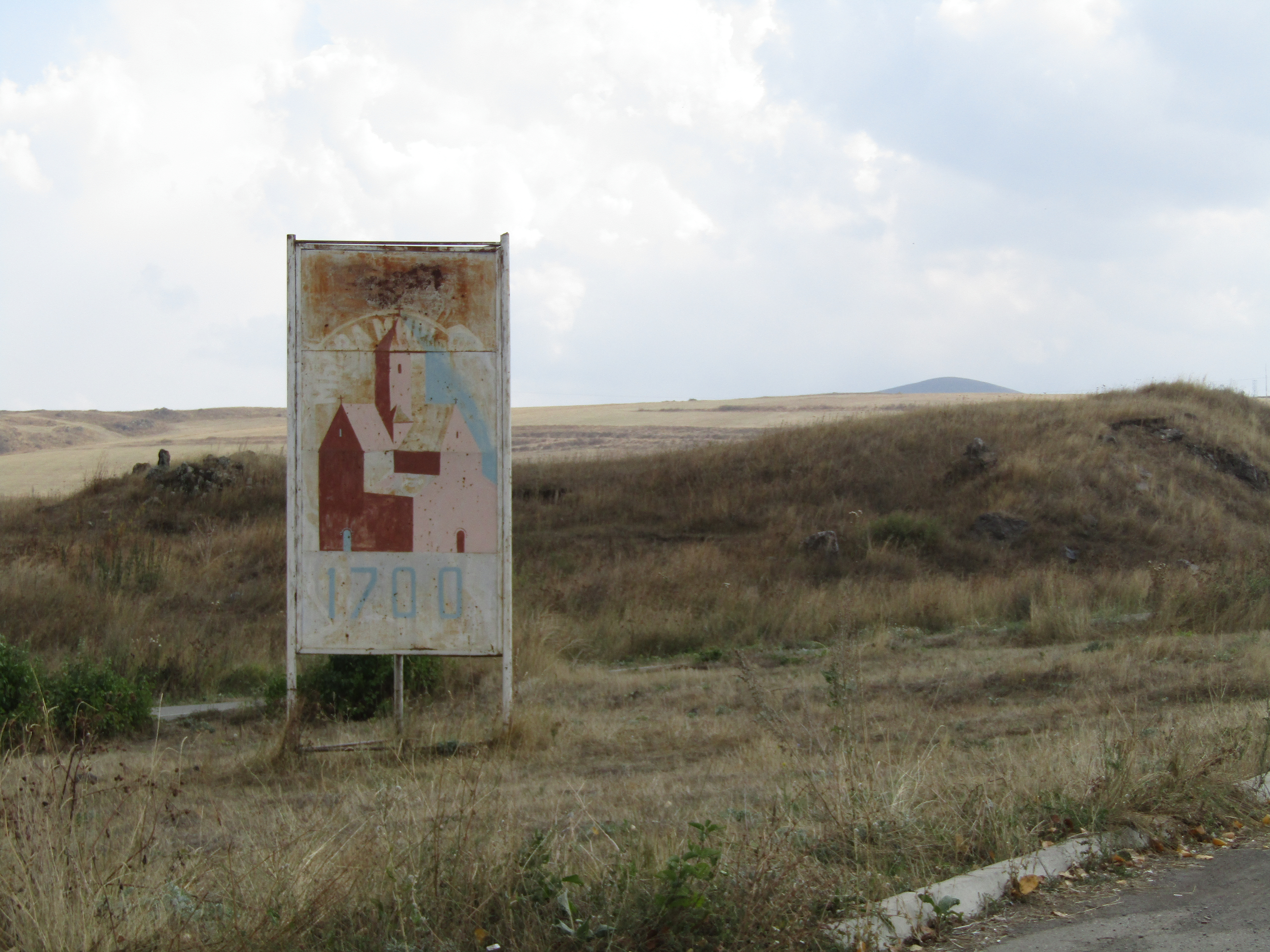
Scenery around Gagarin
