= Gagarin (surname) =

Gagarin (Russian: Гагарин), or Gagarina (feminine; Гагарина), is a Russian surname derived from the word gagara, meaning loon (a waterbird, genus Gavia). Notable people with the surname include:

- Yuri Gagarin (1934–1968), Russian cosmonaut, the first man to travel in space
- Gagarin family, a Rurikid princely family
- Anna Gagarina, maiden name of Anna Lopukhina (1777–1805), mistress of Emperor Paul of Russia
- Ivan Gagarin (1814–1882), Russian Jesuit theologian
- Nikolai Gagarin (1784–1842), Russian soldier and politician
- Grigory Gagarin (1810–1893), Russian painter, major general and administrator
- Polina Gagarina (born 1987), Russian singer, songwriter, actress, and model
- Andrey Gagarin (1934–2011), Russian prince and scientist
- Yekaterina Gagarina (1790–1873), wife of Russian diplomat Prince Grigory Gagarin and the daughter of the Secretary of State Pyotr Soymonov
