= Gagarinsky (inhabited locality) =

Gagarinsky (Russian: Гага́ринский; masculine), Gagarinskaya (Гага́ринская; feminine), or Gagarinskoye (Гага́ринское; neuter) is the name of several rural localities in Russia:

- Gagarinsky (rural locality), a settlement in Bogdanovsky Selsoviet of Uritsky District of Oryol Oblast
- Gagarinskoye, a village in Berezyatsky Selsoviet of Tonshayevsky District of Nizhny Novgorod Oblast
