= Gagarinsky District, Sevastopol =

Coordinates: 44°36′N 33°31′E

Gagarinskiy District Ukrainian: Гагарінський район Russian: Гагаринский район
- Raion in Sevastopol
- Map of Sevastopol and its raions with Gagarin highlighted in red.
- Country: Ukraine (de jure); Russia (de facto)
- Municipality: Sevastopol

Area
  - Total: 61.1 km^{2} (23.6 sq mi)

Population
  - Total: 136,010
  - Density: 1,800/km^{2} (4,700/sq mi)
- Time zone: UTC+4 (MSK)

Gagarinskiy District (Russian: Гагаринский район) or Haharinskyi District (Ukrainian: Гагарінський район) is an urban district of the city of Sevastopol, named after cosmonaut Yuri Gagarin. Population: 136,010 (2014 Census).

== See also ==
- Subdivisions of Russia
- Subdivisions of Ukraine
