= Nakhimov District =

Nakhimovskyi District Ukrainian: Нахімовський район Russian: Нахимовский район
- Urban district in Sevastopol
- Flag Coat of arms
- Map of Sevastopol and its raions with Nakhimov highlighted in red.
- Coordinates: 44°42′N 33°36′E
- Country: Disputed: Ukraine (de jure); Russia (de facto)
- Municipality: Sevastopol

Area
  - Total: 233 km^{2} (90 sq mi)

Population
  - Total: 86,963
  - Density: 4,399/km^{2} (11,390/sq mi)
- Time zone: UTC+4 (MSK)

Nakhimovskyi District (Ukrainian: Нахімовський район) or Nakhimovskiy District (Russian: Нахимовский район) is an urban district of the city of Sevastopol, named after Russian admiral Pavel Stepanovich Nakhimov. Population: 86,963 (2014 Census). Sevastopol International Airport is located in the district.
