= Balaklava District =

Balaklavskyi District Балаклавський район Балаклавский район
- Urban district
- Flag Coat of arms
- Map of Sevastopol and its raions with Balaklava highlighted in red.
- Country: Disputed: Ukraine (de jure); Russia (de facto)
- Municipality: Sevastopol

Area
  - Total: 544.9 km^{2} (210.4 sq mi)

Population
  - Total: 27,620
  - Density: 82.17/km^{2} (212.8/sq mi)
- Time zone: UTC+4 (MSK)

Balaklavskiy District (Russian: Балаклавский район) or Balaklavskyi District (Ukrainian: Балаклавський район) is an urban district of the city of Sevastopol.

The district was created in 1930 as part of the Crimean ASSR with its administrative center in Balaklava. After World War II in 1957, it became part of Sevastopol city municipality. All populated places of the district became incorporated with the city of Sevastopol. In 1976, the city of Inkerman was reinstated as a city. Population: 27,620 (2014 Census).

The district is subdivided into three municipality (councils): Inkerman city council, Orlyne Village Council, and Ternivka Village Council. Balaklavskyi District borders with Bakhchysarai Raion and Yalta Municipality.

== See also ==
- Baydar Valley
