= History of Crimea (1991–2014) =

Crimea under direct Ukrainian administration

With the dissolution of the Soviet Union and Ukrainian independence, the majority ethnic Russian Crimean Peninsula was reorganized as the Republic of Crimea, after a 1991 referendum with the Crimean authorities pushing for more independence from Ukraine and closer links with Russia. In 1995 the Republic was forcibly abolished by Ukraine with the Autonomous Republic of Crimea established firmly under Ukrainian authority. There were also intermittent tensions with Russia over the Soviet Black Sea Fleet, although a 1997 treaty partitioned the Soviet Black Sea Fleet allowing Russia to continue basing its fleet in Sevastopol with the lease extended in 2010. Following the impeachment of the relatively pro-Russia Ukrainian president Viktor Yanukovych, Russia invaded Crimea, overthrew the elected autonomous government and claimed to annex it in 2014.

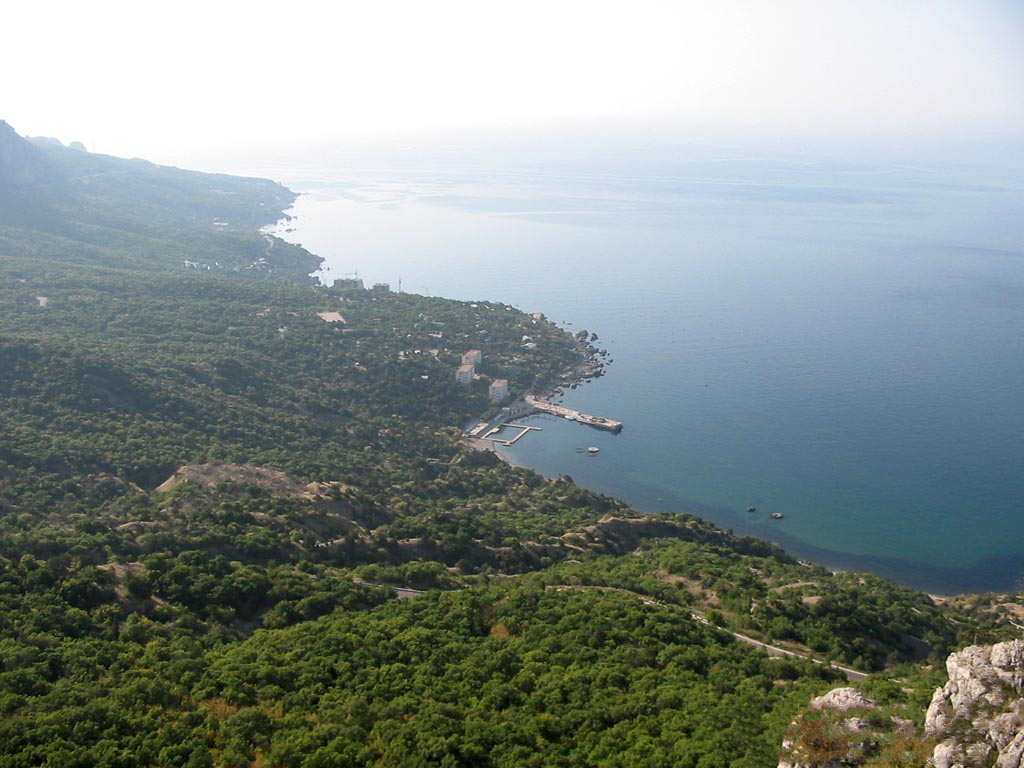
Crimea's southernmost point is the Cape of Sarych on the northern shore of the Black Sea, currently used by the Russian Navy.

== Fall of the USSR ==
With the collapse of the Soviet Union, Crimea being a Crimean Oblast of the Ukrainian Soviet Socialist Republic became part of the newly independent Ukraine. In 1990 at first Russia and a month later Ukraine declared State Sovereignty from the Soviet Union with the ongoing discussion for the New Union Treaty. Half a year later a January 1991 referendum in the Crimean Oblast overwhelmingly voted for Crimea to be a separate participant of the New Union Treaty which would have meant that Crimea would have been a sovereign subject of the renewed USSR and separate from the Ukrainian SSR. and to restore autonomy to the region as the Crimean Autonomous Soviet Socialist Republic. The referendum ballot carried the following sentence: "Do you support re-establishing the Crimean Autonomous Soviet Socialist Republic as a subject of the Union SSR and a participant of the Union Treaty?" Ukrainian independence was supported by a referendum later in 1991 in all regions of the Ukrainian SSR, including Crimea (although in Crimea the independence was supported by a slim majority).

== Republic of Crimea ==
In 1992 the ASSR was renamed as the Republic of Crimea in the newly independent Ukraine which maintained Crimea's autonomous status, while the Supreme Council of Crimea affirmed the peninsula's "sovereignty" as a part of Ukraine. Based on the resolution of the Verkhovna Rada of Crimea (the parliament) on 26 February 1992, the Crimean ASSR was renamed the Republic of Crimea. The Crimean parliament proclaimed self-government on 5 May 1992 and passed the first Crimean constitution together with a declaration of conditional independence on the same day.

There was stiff resistance from Ukraine and a day later, on 6 May, the same parliament inserted a new sentence into this constitution that declared that Crimea was part of Ukraine. A referendum to confirm the decision was not held until 1994 due to the opposition from the Kyiv government. On 17 December 1992, the office of the Ukrainian presidential representative in Crimea was created, which led to a wave of protests a month later.

The Crimean parliament voted to bring in a president in 1993, which the Kyiv government denounced as unconstitutional. In 1994 Crimea elected the pro-Russian and anti-establishment Yuriy Meshkov. The pro-Russian parties also won the parliamentary election that year. However the president quickly alienated the parliament by asserting strong presidential powers. On 8 September, the Crimean parliament degraded the president's powers from the head of state to the head of the executive power only, to which Meshkov responded by disbanding parliament and announcing his control over Crimea four days later. There were several mostly symbolic attempts to get closer relations with Russia, with a new flag mimicking the Russian tricolor, and Crimean time going to Russian rather than Ukrainian time.

Throughout this period the city of Sevastopol retained its special status within Ukraine.

== Fall of the Republic of Crimea ==
On 17 March 1995, the Ukrainian Parliament intervened in the political crisis in Crimea, scrapping the Crimean Constitution and removing Meshkov and scrapping the office of President for his actions against the state and promoting integration with Russia. Almost 4,000 Ukrainian soldiers and police officers were sent to Crimea. Meshkov was removed from power after Ukrainian special forces had entered his residence, disarmed his bodyguards and put him on a plane to Moscow.

Meshkov was replaced by Kyiv-appointed Anatoliy Franchuk, with the intent to rein in Crimean aspirations of autonomy. The Verkhovna Rada, the parliament of Crimea, voted to grant Crimea "extensive home rule" during the dispute. Its status of being subordinate to Kyiv was confirmed eventually by the remaining Crimean authorities. Its name was changed from the Republic of Crimea to the Autonomous Republic of Crimea. After an interim constitution lasting from 4 April 1996 to 23 December 1998, the constitution that would last until the Russian annexation was put into effect.

In the same period, Russian president Boris Yeltsin and Ukraine's Leonid Kravchuk agreed to divide the former Soviet Black Sea Fleet between newly formed Russian and Ukrainian navies.

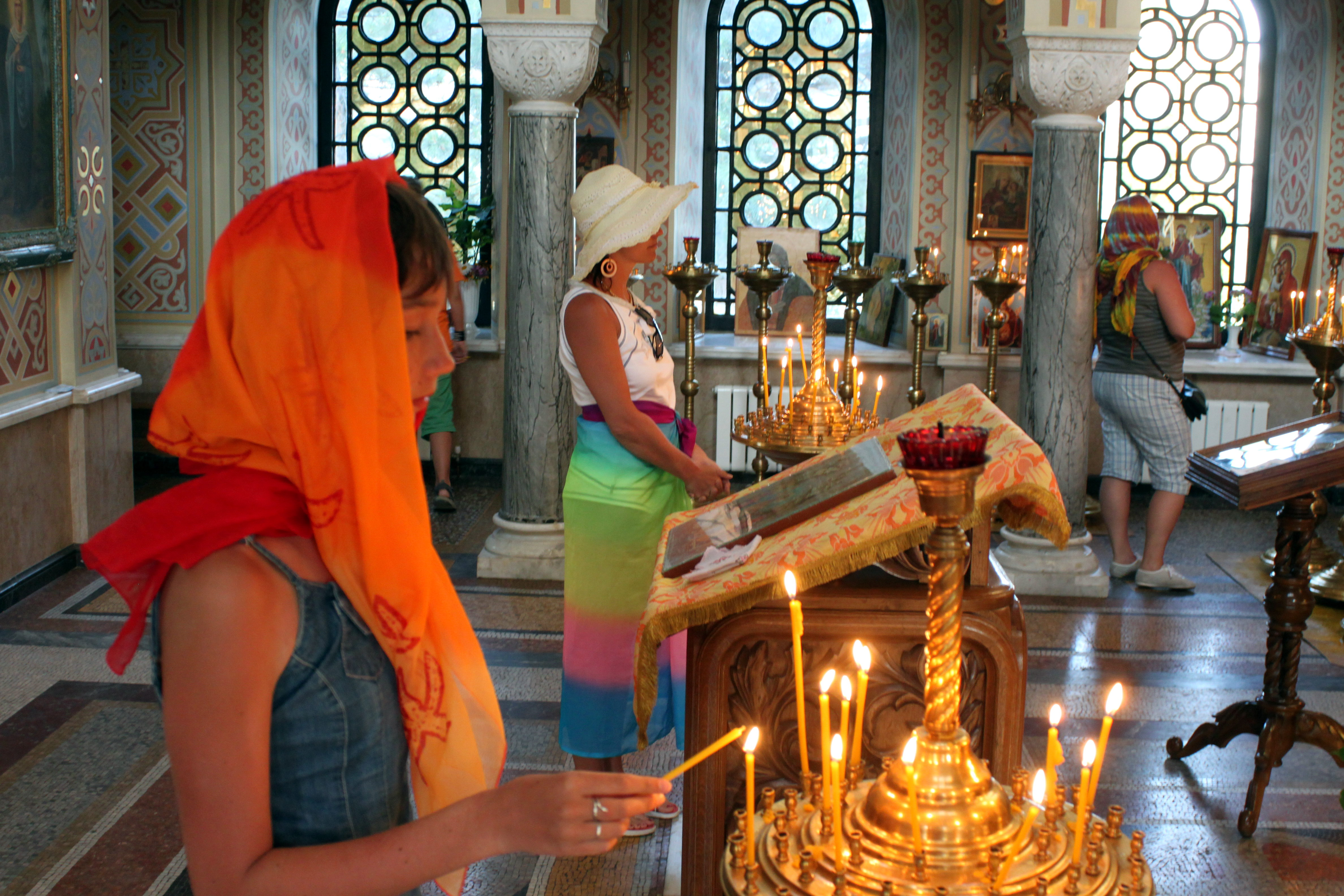
Interior of the Church of the Resurrection of Christ, near Yalta.

== Black Sea Fleet ==
This new situation led to tensions between Russia and Ukraine. With the Black Sea Fleet based on the peninsula, worries of armed skirmishes were occasionally raised. In August 1991, Yuriy Meshkov established the Republican Movement of Crimea which was registered on 19 November.

On 15 January 1993, Kravchuk and Yeltsin in the meeting in Moscow appointed Eduard Baltin as the commander of the Black Sea Fleet. At the same time the Union of the Ukrainian Naval Officers protested the Russian intervention into the Ukrainian internal affairs. Soon after that there were more anti-Ukrainian protests led by the Meshkov's party, the Voters for the Crimean Republic, Yedinstvo, and the Union of Communists that demanded to turn Sevastopol under the Russian jurisdiction and followed by the interview given by the Sevastopol's Communist, Vasyl Parkhomenko, who said that the city's Communists request to recognize the Russian as the state language and restoration of the Soviet Union. On 19 March 1993, the Crimean deputy and the member of the National Salvation Front, Alexander Kruglov, threatened the members of the Crimean Ukrainian Congress not allow into the building of the Republican Council. A couple of days after that, Russia established an information center in Sevastopol. In April 1993, the Ukrainian Ministry of Defence submitted an appeal to Verkhovna Rada to suspend the Yalta Agreement of 1992 that divided the Black Sea Fleet that was followed by the request from the Ukrainian Republican Party to recognize the Fleet either fully Ukrainian or a fleet of a foreign country in Ukraine. Also over 300 Russian legislators called the planned Congress of Ukrainian Residents a political provocation.

In 1994, the legal status of Crimea as part of Ukraine was backed up by Russia, who pledged to uphold the territorial integrity of Ukraine in a memorandum signed in 1994, also signed by the US and UK.

In 1996 the Ukrainian parliament adopted a new Constitution that replaced the Constitution of the Ukrainian SSR. According to the constitution, Ukraine must not house any foreign military bases on its territory. Article 17: ..."The location of foreign military bases shall not be permitted on the territory of Ukraine".

Following the ratification of the May 1997 Treaty of Friendship, Cooperation, and Partnership on friendship and division of the Black Sea Fleet, international tensions slowly eased off. With the treaty, Moscow recognized Ukraine's borders and territorial integrity, and accepted Ukraine's sovereignty over Crimea and Sevastopol. In a separate agreement, Russia was to receive 80 percent of the Black Sea Fleet and use of the military facilities in Sevastopol on a 20-year lease. Both the Ukrainian Naval Forces and Russia's Black Sea Fleet were to be headquartered in Sevastopol. Ukraine extended Russia's lease of the naval facilities under the 2010 Kharkiv Pact in exchange for further discounted natural gas.

However, other controversies between Ukraine and Russia still remained, including the ownership of a lighthouse on Cape Sarych. Because the Russian Navy controlled 77 geographical objects on the south Crimean Shore, the Sevastopol Government Court ordered the vacating of the objects, which the Russian military did not carry out. Since August 3, 2005, the lighthouse has been controlled by the Russian Army. Through the years, there have been various attempts to return Cape Sarych to Ukrainian territory, all of which were unsuccessful.

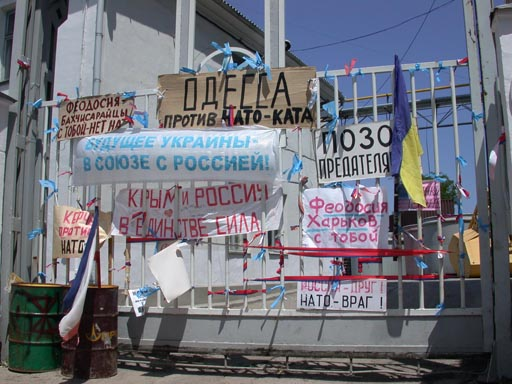
The 2006 anti-NATO protests in Feodosiya

Chaos in the Verkhovna Rada (the Ukrainian parliament) during a debate over the extension of the lease on a Russian naval base erupted on 27 April 2010 after Ukraine's parliament ratified the treaty that extends Russia's lease on a military wharf and shore installations in the Crimean port Sevastopol until 2042. The chairman of the Verkhovna Rada Volodymyr Lytvyn had to be shielded by umbrellas as he was pelted with eggs, while smoke bombs exploded and politicians brawled. Along with the Verkhovna Rada the treaty was ratified by the Russian State Duma as well.

== Repatriation of the Crimean Tatars ==
On 2 September 1991, the National Movement of Crimean Tatars appealed to the V Extraordinary Congress of People's Deputies in Russia demanding the program how to return the deported Crimean Tatar population back to Crimea.

On 14 October 1993, at the same time it established the post of President of Crimea, the Crimean parliament agreed on a quota of Crimean Tatar representation in the Council to 14. The head of the Russian People's Council in Sevastopol, Alexander Kruglov, called it "excessive". The chairman of the Crimean Tatar Mejlis, Mustafa Dzhemilev, used words "categorically against" in regards to the proposed election for Crimean president on 16 January. He stated that there cannot be two presidents in a single state. On 6 November, the Crimean Tatar National Movement leader, Yuriy Osmanov was murdered. A series of terrorist actions rocked the peninsula in the winter; among them were the arson of the Mejlis apartment, the shooting of a Ukrainian official, several hooligan attacks on Meshkov, the bomb explosion in the house of a local parliamentary, the assassination attempt on a Communist presidential candidate, and others. On 2 January 1994, the Mejlis announced a boycott of the presidential elections, which were later canceled. The boycott itself was later taken on by other Crimean Tatar organizations. On 11 January, the Mejlis announced their representative, Mykola Bahrov, the speaker of the Crimean parliament, as the presidential candidate. On 12 January, some other candidates accused Bahrov of severe methods of agitation. At the same time, Russian politician Vladimir Zhirinovsky called on the people of Crimea to vote for the Russian Sergei Shuvainikov.

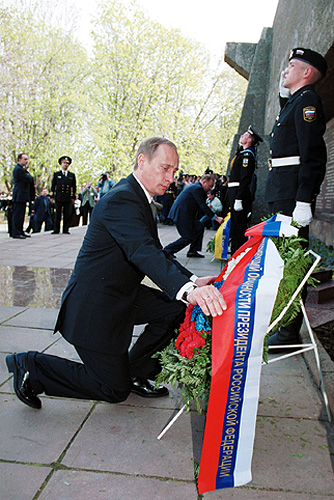
Russian president Vladimir Putin laying wreaths at a monument to the defenders of Sevastopol, April 2000

== Post-2000 tensions ==
In 2006, protests broke out on the peninsula after U.S. Marines arrived at the Crimean city of Feodosiya to take part in the Exercise Sea Breeze 2006 Ukraine–NATO military exercise. Protesters greeted the marines with barricades and slogans bearing "Occupiers go home!" and a couple of days later, the Crimean parliament declared Crimea a "NATO-free territory". After several days of protest, the U.S. Marines withdrew from the peninsula. In 2016, Ukrainian prosecutors would allege that these protests had been arranged by an American political consultant, Paul Manafort, on behalf of the pro-Russia Party of Regions.

In September 2008, the Ukrainian Foreign Minister Volodymyr Ohryzko accused Russia of giving out Russian passports to the population in the Crimea and described it as a "real problem" given Russia's declared policy of military intervention abroad to protect Russian citizens.

During a press conference in Moscow on 16 February 2009, the mayor of Sevastopol Serhiy Kunitsyn claimed (citing recent polls) that the population of Crimea is opposed to the idea of becoming a part of Russia.

Although western newspapers like The Wall Street Journal have speculated about a Russian coup in Sevastopol or another Crimean city in connection with the Russian-Georgian war and the recognition of Abkhazia and South Ossetia by Russia, Valentyn Nalyvaychenko, acting head of the Security Service of Ukraine (SBU), stated on 17 February 2009 that he was confident that any "Ossetian scenario" was impossible in Crimea. The SBU had started criminal proceedings against the pro-Russian association "People's front Sevastopol-Crimea-Russia" in January 2009.

On the 55th anniversary of the transfer of the Crimea from the Russian SFSR to the Ukrainian SSR (on 19 February 2009) some 300 to 500 people took part in rallies to protest against the transfer.

Map of modern Crimea

On 24 August 2009, anti-Ukrainian demonstrations were held in Crimea by ethnic Russian residents. Sergei Tsekov, a senior pro Russian politician, said then that he hoped that Russia would endorse Crimeaan separatism in the same way as it had done in South Ossetia and Abkhazia.

The last election of the Verkhovna Rada of Crimea took place on 31 October 2010 and was won by the Party of Regions.

A pro-Russian demonstration of several thousand people took place in Sevastopol on 23 February 2014 in the wake of Yanukovych's flight during the Revolution of Dignity. On 15 March 2014, the Verkhovna Rada of Ukraine officially dissolved the Verkhovna Rada of Crimea, and, on 17 March 2014, one day before the Russian annexation of Crimea, the State Council of Crimea was established in place of the Verkhovna Rada of Crimea.

Before 2014, Crimea could be considered a part of the political base of then President Viktor Yanukovych. Thus, in the period just prior to 2014, Crimea was not experiencing intense mobilization against Ukraine or on behalf of absorption into Russia.
