= Political status of Crimea =

The Crimean problem (Russian: Проблема Крыма, romanized: Problyema Kryma; Ukrainian: Кримська проблема, romanized: Krymska problema) or the Crimean question (Russian: Крымский вопрос, romanized: Krymskiy vopros; Ukrainian: питання Криму, romanized: pytannia Krymu) is a dispute over the status of Crimea between Ukraine and Russia.

The dispute began during the dissolution of the Soviet Union, but did not escalate into a conflict until the 2014 Ukrainian revolution, when Russian special forces were deployed to occupy Crimea and took over its government buildings. The official results of an internationally unrecognized referendum held during the occupation allegedly indicated overwhelming support for Russian annexation. The Crimean parliament and the autonomous city of Sevastopol unilaterally declared independence from Ukraine to ideally form a country named Republic of Crimea. Russia then annexed the region and created two federal subjects, the Republic of Crimea (as a republic) and Sevastopol (as a federal city). Ukraine and the majority of the international community continue to regard Crimea as occupied Ukrainian territory; a United Nations General Assembly resolution declared the referendum invalid and affirmed the territorial integrity of Ukraine. Despite international opinion however, the currency, tax, time zone and legal system are all operational under de facto Russian control. Ukraine has attempted to resolve the matter by filing litigation in multiple international criminal, environmental, political (European Union), and other courts.

== History ==
In 1921, the Crimean Autonomous Soviet Socialist Republic was created as part of the Russian Soviet Federative Socialist Republic. Throughout its time the Soviet Union, Crimea underwent a population change. As a result of alleged collaboration with the Germans by Crimean Tatars during World War II, all Crimean Tatars were deported by the Soviet regime and the peninsula was resettled with other peoples, mainly Russians and Ukrainians. Modern experts say that the deportation was part of the Soviet plan to gain access to the Dardanelles and acquire territory in Turkey, where the Tatars had Turkic ethnic kin, or to remove minorities from the Soviet Union's border regions.

Nearly 8,000 Crimean Tatars died during the deportation, and tens of thousands perished subsequently due to the harsh exile conditions. The Crimean Tatar deportation resulted in the abandonment of 80,000 households and 145,600 hectares of land.

The autonomous republic without its titled nationality was downgraded to an oblast within the Russian SFSR on 30 June 1945.

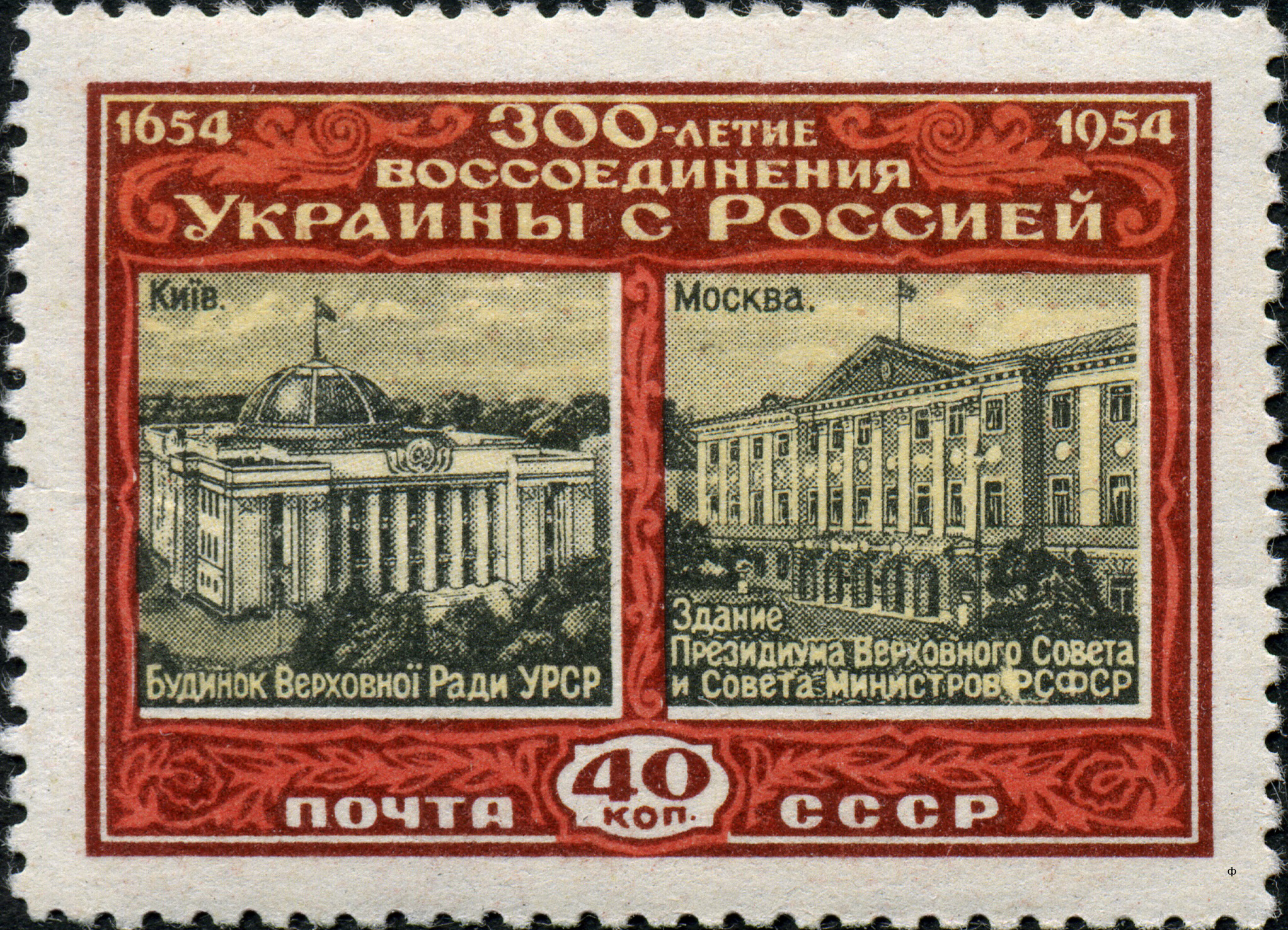
1954 Soviet propaganda stamp marking the 300th anniversary of Ukraine's reunification with Russia.

On 19 February 1954, the oblast was transferred from the Russian SFSR to the Ukrainian SSR jurisdiction, on the basis of "the integral character of the economy, the territorial proximity and the close economic and cultural ties between the Crimea Province and the Ukrainian SSR" and to commemorate the 300th anniversary of Ukraine's union with Russia.

From 1991, the territory was covered by the Autonomous Republic of Crimea and Sevastopol City within independent Ukraine. In 1994, Russia signed the Budapest Memorandum on Security Assurances, which states that it would "Respect Belarusian, Kazakh and Ukrainian independence, sovereignty, and the existing borders".

=== The Black Sea Fleet and Sevastopol ===
Post-independence, the dispute over control of the Black Sea Fleet and Sevastopol, the Crimean port city where the fleet was based, was a source of tensions for Russia–Ukraine relations. Until a final agreement was reached in 1997 with the signing of the Partition Treaty and Russian–Ukrainian Friendship Treaty, where Ukraine allowed Russia basing rights in Sevastopol and Crimea until 2017.

Crimea hosts Ukraine's largest ethnic Russian population, many of whom are retired military personnel or employees of the Russian Black Sea Fleet, especially in Sevastopol. Between 1992–1995, the dispute over the future of the fleet exacerbated internal frictions, with statements by Russian politicians encouraging separatist sentiments.

=== Sovereignty and geopolitics ===
Despite being an independent country since 1991, the former Soviet republic Ukraine has been perceived by Russia as being part of its sphere of influence. Iulian Chifu and his co-authors claimed in a book that in regard to Ukraine, Russia pursued a modernized version of the Brezhnev Doctrine on "limited sovereignty", which dictates that the sovereignty of Ukraine cannot be larger than that of the Warsaw Pact prior to the demise of the Soviet sphere of influence. This claim is based on statements of Russian leaders that possible integration of Ukraine into NATO would jeopardize Russia's national security.

The issue resurfaced in late 2000s over Ukraine asserting its sovereignty and Russia's concern over its western orientation. In 2008, Russia used Sevastopol and the Black Sea Fleet in the Russo-Georgian War and ignored Ukraine regulations, leading to Ukrainian President Yushchenko's declaration that the lease deal would not be extended and that the fleet would have to leave Sevastopol by 2017. However, in 2010 president Yanukovych signed the Kharkiv Pact amidst Russia–Ukraine gas disputes.

In September 2013, Russia warned Ukraine that if it went ahead with a planned Association Agreement with EU, it would face consequences. Sergey Glazyev, adviser to President Vladimir Putin, said that, "Ukrainian authorities make a huge mistake if they think that the Russian reaction will become neutral in a few years from now. This will not happen." Glazyev allowed for the possibility of separatist movements springing up in the Russian-speaking east and south of Ukraine.

=== Evolution of status of the Crimean Peninsula within independent Ukraine ===
==== Crimean ASSR and Republic of Crimea ====
After the Crimean referendum of 1991, which asked whether Crimea should be elevated to a signatory of the New Union Treaty (that is, become a union republic on its own), the Ukrainian SSR restored Crimea's autonomous status (Crimean Autonomous SSR), but confirmed that autonomy restored as a part of the Ukrainian SSR. The Crimean Oblast council became Supreme Council of Crimea and, on 4 September 1991, passed the Declaration of state sovereignty of Crimea.

Following the dissolution of the Soviet Union, the ASSR renamed itself the Republic of Crimea. The Ukrainian government initially accepted its name, but not its claims to be a state. According to Ukrainian law "On status of the autonomous Republic of Crimea", passed on 29 April 1992, "Republic of Crimea is an autonomous part of Ukraine and independently decides on matters, of its application of the Constitution and laws of Ukraine" (art. 1). The Regional Supreme Council, on the contrary, insisted that "Republic of Crimea is a legal democratic state", which "has supremacy in respect to natural, material, cultural and spiritual heritage" and "exercises its sovereign rights and full power" on its territory (art. 1 of the May 1992 Constitution), but also a "part of Ukraine and establishes relations in it on a basis of the treaty and agreements" (art. 9). Both Ukrainian law on autonomy status and the 1992 Constitution of Crimea were amended later that year, putting the Republic's status in between what was proposed in the initial revision of the 1992 Constitution and what was proposed in April 1992 Ukrainian law on the status of the Republic.

On 21 May 1992 the Supreme Soviet of Russia declared 1954 transfer of Crimea as having "no legal force", because it was adopted "in violation of the Constitution (Fundamental Law) of the Russian SFSR and legislative process", but because subsequent legislation and the 1990 Russo-Ukrainian treaty constituted that fact, parliament considered it necessary to resolve the Crimean question in negotiations between Ukraine and Russia and on the basis of the popular will of the inhabitants of Crimea. A similar resolution was adopted for Sevastopol a year later. Both moves were condemned by Ukraine and resulted in no changes to the Russian Constitution (neither 1978 nor 1993 documents enumerated Crimea and Sevastopol as federal subjects).

In 1994, after parliamentary and presidential elections in the Republic, the Supreme Council and the executive became dominated by the Russian Bloc (which had won 57 seats in the Supreme Council of Crimea and Presidency for its member, Yuri Meshkov). Following a referendum, held in the same year, the Supreme Council of Crimea restored the 1992 Constitution to its original revision.

==== Autonomous Republic of Crimea ====
A year later, the 1992 Crimean constitution, along with the presidency and regional citizenship, was declared null and void by the Ukrainian Parliament, which by that time, had renamed the area from "Republic of Crimea" to Autonomous Republic of Crimea. Another Constitution was passed by Crimean parliament in 1995, but many parts of it were rejected by the Ukrainian parliament; among them were the republic's name (which was to remain "Republic of Crimea") and citizenship. Meanwhile, during drafting of the new Ukrainian Constitution, the question of autonomy was much debated: some legislators proposed abolishing it altogether (downgrading back to oblast status or to autonomy but not autonomous republic), while other legislators proposed legalising the 1992 Constitution of Crimea provisions (original May revision) in the new Ukrainian Constitution. Ultimately, the new Constitution of Ukraine adopted neither extreme and reiterated the autonomous status of the republic, while downgrading some of its powers (such as the regional Supreme Council's powers to enact legislation in form of laws ("zakoni")). The Republic was declared to be the "Autonomous Republic of Crimea", but also an "inseparable constituent part of Ukraine". A new Crimean constitution, complying with provisions of the Ukrainian one, was adopted in 1998.

==== Status of Sevastopol ====
Before the 1954 transfer of Crimea, Sevastopol was elevated into a "city of republican subordination" of the Russian SFSR – a predecessor of the modern status of "city of federal importance". Nevertheless, in practice it was still governed as a part of the Crimean Oblast; for example, inhabitants of Sevastopol elected deputies into the Crimean Oblast Council, and all its structures, such as local militsiya departments, etc., were subordinated to oblast structures, and therefore de facto transferred, too. The Ukrainian Constitution of 1978 listed Sevastopol as one of its "cities of republican subordination" (along with Kyiv), whilst the Russian constitution of the same year did not list Sevastopol as such.

In 1993, the Supreme Soviet of the Russian Federation issued a resolution, which "confirms Russian federal status of Sevastopol" and requested a parliamentary commission to prepare and present to Congress of People's Deputies of Russia corresponding constitutional amendments, but 1993 Russian constitutional crisis prevented that from happening and initial revisions of the Constitution of Russia, adopted on 12 December 1993, did not list Sevastopol as a federal subject. Three years later, the State Duma declared that Russia has a right to exercise sovereignty over Sevastopol, but this resolution went without any actual effect. An agreement was concluded in 1997 by the Russian and Ukrainian governments, allowing the Black Sea Fleet to stay in Sevastopol until 2017. Later this was extended by another 25 years until 2042, with a possible option to extend this period until 2047.

=== 2014 annexation and subsequent developments ===
After the events of Euromaidan, the referendum and the decision holding it was held during and after Russia's implementation of a military presence in Crimea. Igor Girkin, one of the major Russian commanders of the action, explained that the "overwhelming national support for the self-defence" as portrayed by the Russian media was fiction, and a majority of the law enforcement, administration and army were opposed to it. Girkin stated that under his command, the rebels "collected" deputies into the chambers, and had to "forcibly drive the deputies to vote [to join Russia]".

On 14 March, the Crimean status referendum was deemed unconstitutional by the Constitutional Court of Ukraine, and a day later, the Verkhovna Rada formally dissolved the Crimean parliament. On 16 March, a Crimean referendum on the status of the peninsula was held, which, despite opposition from the Ukrainian government, was held after a decision by the Verkhovna Rada of the Autonomous Republic of Crimea. The day before, on 15 March, the Verkhovna Rada of Ukraine passed a resolution to early terminate the powers of the Verkhovna Rada of the ARC, and on 14 March, the Constitutional Court of Ukraine declared the referendum unconstitutional. According to the official results released by the Crimean authorities, 97% of voters voted in favor of secession from Ukraine and joining the Russian Federation. However, the referendum was held in the absence of international observers, which raised doubts about its legitimacy and transparency. A number of states and international organizations did not recognize the results of the vote, pointing to numerous reports of fraud and violations during the voting process, as well as the presence of Russian troops in Crimea, which could have influenced the will of the citizens.

The peninsula then was annexed by Russia where it was converted into a federal district under the name of Crimean Federal District. However, the annexation divided the Autonomous Republic and the city of Sevastopol once again into two separate entities: the Autonomous Republic became the Republic of Crimea as a Russian republic while Sevastopol became a Russian federal city.

Regardless of all this, Ukraine and the vast majority of the international community have not recognized the validity of the referendum, and have not recognized the accession of this region into Russia.

Only Russia and a few other nations have recognized all these events. The lack of recognition from Ukraine and the international community is based primarily on the fact that the referendum included an option to join Russia while the region was under military occupation by Russia itself. The European Union, United States, Canada and several other nations condemned the decision to hold a referendum. In addition, the Mejlis of the Crimean Tatar People—the unofficial political association of the Crimean Tatars—called for a boycott of the referendum.

Results of the UN General Assembly vote about the territorial integrity of Ukraine in 2014. In favor Against Abstentions Absent

In 2014, UN General Assembly adopted a non-binding resolution declaring the referendum invalid and reaffirming Ukraine's territorial integrity by a vote of 100 to 11 with 58 abstentions and 24 absent. Since 2014, the UN General Assembly has voted several times, most recently in December 2019, to affirm Ukraine's territorial integrity, condemn the 'temporary occupation' of Crimea, and reaffirm nonrecognition of its annexation.

The Ministry of Temporarily Occupied Territories and Internally displaced persons (Ukrainian: Міністерство з питань тимчасово окупованих територій та внутрішньо переміщених осіб України) is a Ukrainian government ministry officially established on 20 April 2016 to manage occupied parts of Donetsk, Luhansk and Crimea regions affected by Russian military intervention of 2014.

In 2021, Ukraine launched the Crimea Platform, a diplomatic initiative aimed at protecting the rights of Crimean inhabitants and ultimately reversing the annexation of Crimea.

Following Russia's full-scale invasion of Ukraine in February 2022, the strategic importance of Crimea increased significantly, serving as a key military base for Russian operations in southern Ukraine. Ukraine has since launched multiple operations aimed at challenging Russian control over the peninsula, including targeted strikes on military infrastructure in Crimea.

== Stances ==
=== Russia ===
Russia recognized the short-lived Republic of Crimea as a country shortly before concluding the aforementioned treaty of accession, which was approved by the Constitutional Court of Russia. Russia claimed the Republic of Crimea (country) as a federal district, the Crimean Federal District, on the grounds of historical control of the area and the local population's right to self-determination reflected in the annexation vote. On 28 July 2016 the Crimean Federal District was abolished and Crimea was included in the Southern Federal District.

=== Ukraine ===
The Government of Ukraine did not recognize the Republic of Crimea's claim to sovereignty, nor the unification of the Autonomous Republic of Crimea with Sevastopol, nor the referendum that paved the way for Crimean secession. The Ministry of Temporarily Occupied Territories and Internally displaced persons (Ukrainian: Міністерство з питань тимчасово окупованих територій та внутрішньо переміщених осіб України) is a government ministry in Ukraine that was officially established on 20 April 2016 to manage occupied parts of Donetsk, Luhansk and Crimea regions affected by Russian invasion of 2014.

=== Others ===
==== Pro-Russian stances on Crimea ====
The following members of the United Nations have taken pro-Russian stances on Crimea.

State	Notes
Belarus	The position of Belarus was vague until late 2021. It previously included comments by Belarusian president Alexander Lukashenko, who on the one hand said "Ukraine should remain an integral, indivisible, non-aligned state" and "As for Crimea, I do not like it when the integrity and independence of a country are broken", and on the other hand said "Whether Crimea will be recognized as a region of the Russian Federation de jure does not really matter" and "Today Crimea is part of the Russian Federation. No matter whether you recognize it or not, the fact remains." However, in late November 2021, this position shifted as Lukashenko made explicit statements in favor of recognition of Crimea as Russian. In particular, he announced that he plans to visit Crimea, and that would amount to Belarus recognizing the territory as part of Russia, adding "We all understood that de facto Crimea is Russia's Crimea. After a referendum Crimea has become Russia de jure as well". He added that the national airline Belavia would begin flying to Crimea when necessary.
Bolivia	Under President Evo Morales, Bolivia voted against the resolution pertaining to Ukraine's territorial integrity and voted against the resolution reaffirming non-recognition of Russia's annexation in 2017. In 2016, Morales declared his support for Russia on Crimea.
Burundi	Burundi voted against the 2018 UN General Assembly resolution 73/194 "Problem of the militarization of the Autonomous Republic of Crimea and the city of Sevastopol, Ukraine, as well as parts of the Black Sea and the Sea of Azov"
Central African Republic	In 2023, President Faustin-Archange Touadéra expressed support for Russian involvement in Ukraine.
Cuba	Cuba has officially recognized Crimea as a part of Russia.
Eritrea	Eritrean President Isaias Afwerki denied the existence of a Russia-Ukraine war and instead spoke of a NATO war on Russia. Eritrea has also sent a delegation to Crimea.
Mali	In 2023, Malian military junta leader, Assimi Goïta expressed support for Russian involvement in Ukraine.
Myanmar	The spokesperson for Myanmar's State Administration Council, Zaw Min Tun, supported the 2022 Russian invasion of Ukraine, stating that it "was acting to protect its sovereignty" and praised Russia's role in "balancing global power".
Nicaragua	On 27 March 2014, Nicaragua officially recognized Crimea as a part of Russia.
North Korea	On 15 March 2014, North Korean ambassador to Russia Kim Yong-jae expressed support for Russia's position.
Sudan	Nadir Yusuf Babiker, the Sudanese ambassador to Russia, announced recognition of Crimea as part of the Russian Federation. According to him, Sudan believes that the Crimean referendum complies with international law. The ambassador added that representatives of his country's business circles were planning to take part in the upcoming Yalta Economic Forum.
Venezuela	On 7 March 2014, the Foreign Ministry released a statement which said President Nicolas Maduro "condemns the coup perpetrated by extremist groups in Ukraine following an attrition strategy promoted from abroad by the government of the United States and its NATO allies." It further stated, "the installation in Kyiv of de facto authorities not only threatens Ukraine's national unity, but the stability of the entire region as it places in danger Ukrainian citizens of Russian origin and the Russian Federation's own sovereignty."
Zimbabwe	On 22 December 2014, Zimbabwe's Minister of the Environment Saviour Kasukuwere became the first non-Russian politician to visit Crimea since its March 2014 annexation "to offer advice on how to deal with international sanctions". Zimbabwe also voted against the March 2014 United Nations General Assembly Resolution 68/262 aimed at recognizing Crimea within Ukraine's borders and underscoring the invalidity of the 2014 Crimean referendum.

The following non UN-member states have recognized the Republic of Crimea and Sevastopol as federal subjects of Russia:

State	Notes
Abkhazia	The President of Abkhazia Alexander Ankvab said, "This is a classic example of when the will of the people is above to all" and "Abkhazia respects the will of Crimeans, [we] support and recognize their fateful choice [and] a nationwide solution is based not only on the historical past but on the modern political realities."
Artsakh	Artsakh ceased to exist on 1 January 2024, following the dissolution of its government after the 2023 Nagorno-Karabakh ceasefire agreement.
South Ossetia	On 5 March 2014, Minister of Foreign Affairs David G. Sanakoyev released a statement blaming the unrest on the coup in Kyiv carried out by "extremists" and U.S. interference. He further noted: "This unrest raised discontent of predominantly Russian speaking population of the Autonomous Republic of Crimea and Eastern regions of Ukraine who did not want to have the same scenario in the places of their residence. People of South Ossetia understand what is happening in Ukraine more than anybody else. South Ossetia suffered consequences of Georgian nationalism in August 2008, supported by clearly fascist Ukrainian organizations such as UNA-UNSO. It should be said that we express full solidarity with Russian Federation in support of the compatriots in Ukraine to prevent escalation and bloodshed."

Former:

State	Notes
Islamic Republic of Afghanistan	President Hamid Karzai said, "we respect the decision the people of Crimea took through a recent referendum that considers Crimea as part of the Russian Federation."

Unclear:

State	Notes
Armenia	On 7 March, President Serzh Sargsyan stated at the European People's Party session in Dublin that the "Ukrainian events are a matter of serious concern to all of us". He called "to take all possible measures in order to ease the tension and find reasonable solutions by the means of a dialogue." During a phone conversation with Putin on 19 March President Serzh Sargsyan said the referendum in Crimea was an exercise of peoples' right to self-determination via free expression of will.
Laos	The Lao People's Democratic Republic has sent a delegation to the peninsula

==== Pro-Ukrainian stances on Crimea ====
The following member states have taken a pro-Ukrainian stance, varying from sanctions against Russia to giving support to Ukraine to voting for Ukraine's claim on the territory:

State	Notes
Albania	On 3 March 2014, in a statement, the Ministry of Foreign Affairs condemned the military intervention of the Russian Federation in Ukraine, in defiance of the norms of international law and in violation of territorial sovereignty and integrity of the country.
Andorra	
Argentina	
Australia	On 2 March 2014, Prime Minister Tony Abbott said that Russia's actions in Ukraine were "not the kind ... of a friend and neighbour and I think Russia should back off". The Prime Minister told the Australian House of Representatives on 3 March that "Russia should back off, it should withdraw its forces from the Ukraine and people of the Ukraine ought to be able to determine their future themselves" with the Australian Government cancelling a planned visit to Russia by the Trade Minister Andrew Robb.
Austria	
Azerbaijan	Azerbaijani ambassador to Ukraine, Eynulla Madatli, expressed public support on 3 March 2014 for Ukraine's territorial integrity.
Bahamas	
Bahrain	
Barbados	
Belgium	
Benin	
Bhutan	
Bulgaria	On 1 March 2014, President Rosen Plevneliev said in a statement that "Bulgaria is for preserving the sovereignty, the territorial integrity and the democratic future of Ukraine". The president further said that the presence of foreign forces and their unauthorized activity within the territory of a sovereign state "raises serious concern" and called for an end to any provocative actions that could lead to "irreparable consequences not only for the region, but also for the international order". In a later statement that day, following the Russia's Parliament decree allowing the usage of Russian armed forces in Crimea, President Plevneliev reiterated that "the only lasting solution may be achieved by peaceful means and if the territorial integrity and sovereignty of Ukraine is guaranteed" and that "the usage of military force to occupy foreign territories is violation of the rules of international law". The president also called on the UN Security Council and the countries-guarantors to the Budapest Memorandum to ensure a peaceful solution to the problem and to avoid a further escalation of the tension. In conclusion, President Plevneliev stated that "the people of Ukraine should alone decide what their future should be in a democratic way".
Cameroon	
Canada	On 28 February 2014, Foreign Minister Baird "congratulated the new government and emphasized the need to honour the 1994 Budapest Declaration's commitment to Ukraine's territorial sovereignty and national unity at this critical time." On a 1 March phone call President Obama and Prime Minister Harper "affirmed the importance of unity within the international community in support of international law, and the future of Ukraine and its democracy.' On the same day, Harper condemned Russia's military intervention in Ukraine; he announced that Canada had both recalled its ambassador to Russia and withdrawn from preparations for the 40th G8 summit, which was to be chaired by Russia. On 3 March, the Canadian House of Commons passed a unanimous motion condemning Russia's intervention in Crimea. This was followed by Prime Minister Harper calling Russia's actions an "invasion and occupation" and Foreign Minister Baird comparing them to Nazi Germany's occupation of the Sudetenland in 1938. Canada then suspended all military cooperation with Russia and the flag of Ukraine was flown on Parliament Hill in Ottawa on 4 March. On 7 March 2014 Canada requested any Russian military servicemen (at least nine) to leave its territory in 24 hours.
Cape Verde	
Chad	On 15 March 2014, the Chadian representative to the UN Security Council, Mamet Zene Cherif, voted in favor of a US sponsored resolution condemning the 16 March referendum. He elaborated that his government had consistently supported Ukraine's sovereignty and territorial integrity, and had voted in favour of the resolution out of a commitment to such principles. Concerned about the continued escalation of the crisis, despite the Council's appeals for restraint and calm, he said it was still possible for the parties to open the way for national reconciliation and maintenance of territorial integrity by engaging in dialogue. With that, he reiterated the importance of upholding the principles of territorial integrity, non-use of force and peaceful settlement of disputes, in line with the Charter.
Chile	15 March 2014 the Chilean representative to the UN Security Council, Octavio Errazuriz voted in favor of a resolution condemning the 16 March referendum. He elaborated that "it was an appropriate response to the crisis in Ukraine. The Budapest Memorandum required the parties to observe Ukraine's independence and current borders, and to refrain from military measures. The planned referendum was not in line with Ukraine's Constitution, he said, emphasizing the fundamental importance of ensuring that the rule of law was observed, nationally and internationally. Indeed, it was for Ukrainians to choose their future through a democratic process that respected minority rights. The crisis must be resolved peacefully through dialogue, and Chile regretted the Council's inability to support the resolution due to the use of the veto. The Council had not fulfilled its responsibility."
Colombia	The Foreign Ministry, on behalf of the government, released a press release expressing "deep concern about the situation in Ukraine" while also deploring the "acts of violence that have taken place in the last couple of days". In the same press statement, Colombia urged the Government of Ukraine to "guarantee security, human rights, and the fundamental liberties of its citizens".
Costa Rica	
Croatia	
Cyprus	
Czech Republic	Foreign Minister Lubomír Zaorálek said on 1 March 2014, "I unambiguously reject and condemn the steps taken by the Russian Federation over the recent days. ... Russia has committed, not only to respect Ukraine's territorial integrity and sovereignty, but also to guarantee them." He also said it reminded him of the 1968 Warsaw Pact invasion of Czechoslovakia. On 6 April 2014, the president of the Czech Republic, Miloš Zeman said in an interview for Czech radio that the EU should impose the toughest sanctions on Russia as "at the moment Russia would decide to widen its territorial expansion to the Ukrainian east, this will become really serious as this would trigger a chain reaction". But he also expressed an opinion that Crimea would not be returned to Ukraine in the foreseeable future. Czech President Zeman also said: "Even though I understand the interests of Crimea's Russian-speaking majority, which was annexed to Ukraine by Khrushchev, we have our experience with the 1968 Russian military invasion."
Denmark	Foreign Minister Martin Lidegaard stated on 2 March that, "This is a partial invasion of Ukraine by Russia". He made it clear that Denmark was working closely with the rest of EU and was preparing a condemning statement. He also called for Russia to respect international law.
Democratic Republic of the Congo	
Dominican Republic	
Estonia	Foreign Minister Urmas Paet stated on 1 March 2014 that, "The Russian parliament's decision to authorise the use of troops in Ukraine is a clear threat to Ukraine's sovereignty and territorial integrity," and that Russia's "... military threats and actions against Ukraine must stop." He called for the Ukrainian leadership to pursue all actions to reduce tensions and restore societal unity. Estonian President Toomas Hendrik Ilves stated that the annexation was "done too quickly and professionally not to have been planned far in advance" and said that the failure of the Budapest Memorandum "may have far-reaching implications for generations. I don't know what country in the future would ever give up its nuclear weapons in exchange for a security guarantee."
Finland	Foreign Minister Erkki Tuomioja stated on 1 March 2014, that Russia was implementing a military takeover of Crimean territory and by doing so Russia was violating several international treaties and laws.
France	The representative of the Ministry of Foreign Affairs, Romain Nadal, expressed his concerns about events in Crimea and noted that foreign minister Laurent Fabius had repeatedly called for the preservation of the unity and integrity of Ukraine.
Georgia	On 1 March 2014, President Giorgi Margvelashvili called on the international community "not to allow new conflict in Europe and to use all the available means in order to avert possible aggression and to preserve sovereignty and territorial integrity of Ukraine." On 11 March 2014 the president further stated that "The failure of the international community to punish Russia for its 2008 invasion of Georgia has let Moscow think it can get away with seizing Ukraine's Crimea region". On 6 March, the Parliament of Georgia adopted a resolution supporting the sovereignty and territorial integrity of Ukraine and strongly condemning forceful actions against sovereign Ukraine by the Russian Federation as well as all other actions carried out in violation of basic principles of international law. The resolution emphasized that "the recent aggressive acts of the Russian Federation against the sovereignty and territorial integrity of Ukraine, including the use of military units on the territory of Ukraine in violation of provisions of the bilateral agreements and the threat of large scale military aggression, pose a serious threat not only to friendly Ukraine, but also to Georgia and the entire Europe."
Germany	Chancellor Angela Merkel called Russia's actions "unacceptable" and said they had broken international law. Merkel noted that Russia accepted the independence of Ukraine in 1994 and was not honoring the Budapest Memorandum on Security Assurances. In a policy statement delivered to the Bundestag, she stated that "Ukraine's territorial integrity is not negotiable". She reportedly said that Putin "lives in a different world" while talking with Barack Obama via phone. Chancellor Merkel also stated "The so-called referendum…, the declaration of independence …, and the absorption into the Russian Federation (were), in our firm opinion,…against international law" and that it was "shameful" for Russia to compare the independence of Kosovo with the referendum on the Russian annexation of Crimea. In March 2015, after talks with Petro Poroshenko, Angela Merkel remarked that the annexation was in violation of international law, and therefore it was Germany's goal to restore the Crimean peninsula to Ukraine.
Greece	
Guatemala	
Guinea	
Haiti	
Honduras	
Hungary	In a statement issued 1 March 2014, the Ministry of Foreign Affairs expressed concern about the situation on the Crimean Peninsula. The Ministry noted that the Visegrád Four Foreign Ministers had asked both the Kyiv government leaders and the Donetsk region's political leaders to abstain from provocative steps that might heighten tension and lead to violence. The Hungarian government's reaction was criticized at home for being soft on Russia because of a recent deal PM Viktor Orbán had made with Russia to expand the Paks Nuclear Power Plant. Additionally, Foreign Minister János Martonyi reassured ethnic Hungarians in Ukraine that Hungary would protect their interests.
Iceland	Iceland condemned the actions of the Russian Federation regarding Crimea and expressed its full support to the Ukrainian people. Icelandic Minister for Foreign Affairs Gunnar Bragi Sveinsson told reporters in Kyiv on Saturday, 22 March 2014.
Indonesia	The Indonesian Foreign Minister Marty Natalegawa issued a statement expressing Indonesia's deep concern over the situation in Ukraine. He described the situation in Ukraine as "an international crisis which threatens not only the sovereignty and territorial integrity of Ukraine, but also risks raising tensions in the relations between the affected countries." Indonesia respects the sovereignty of Ukraine and has called for all parties to resolve the issue through peaceful means. Indonesia also calls on the UN Security Council, including Permanent Members, "to shoulder its responsibility in accordance to the Charter of the United Nations in maintaining international peace and security in responding to the crisis in Ukraine." The statement also suggests that the United Nations send a special envoy to the Secretary General to the affected areas.
Ireland	Tánaiste and Minister for Foreign Affairs Eamon Gilmore expressed concern regarding the developments in Ukraine. He called on the Russian Federation to abide by international law and to respect Ukraine's territorial integrity and independence, called on all parties "to work to ensure that, through dialogue, all legitimate concerns can be addressed", and stressed the need for all sides to "avoid any provocation", the latter expression echoing language used by both Russia Today and the European Parliament in relation to Kyiv's abolition of the regional status of minority languages, including Russian, as well as a recent attack on the headquarters of the Communist Party of Ukraine.
Italy	Italian Prime Minister Matteo Renzi accused Putin of having committed "an unacceptable violation". On 19 March, during a speech in the Chamber of Deputies, Renzi stated that the Crimean status referendum was illegal and that the G8 countries must start cooperating to solve the crisis and prevent a return to the Cold War. The Foreign Ministry's statement said, "Italy and its European partners strongly condemn the violation of Ukrainian sovereignty and territorial integrity and call on Russia to immediately withdraw its armed forces. They view the political-diplomatic channel as the only way to resolve the crisis." In July 2018, the newly appointed interior minister of Italy, Matteo Salvini, declared that the annexation of Crimea by Russia was legitimate, thus no official statement was made.
Japan	The Foreign Ministry issued a statement in which it said that the authorisation "for use of the armed forces of the Russian Federation in Ukraine heightens the tension in the region and would harm the peace and stability of the international community," as well that "In this regard, Japan expresses grave anxiety and concern over the decision. ... Japan strongly expects that the situation in Ukraine will be settled in a peaceful manner and strongly urges all the parties concerned to behave with maximum self-restraint and responsibility, to fully observe the relevant international laws," it concluded.
Jordan	On 15 March 2014, Jordan voted for the resolution condemning the 16 March referendum. The Jordanian ambassador, Zeid Ra'ad Zeid Al-Hussein stating he had voted in favour of the resolution out of respect for Ukraine's sovereignty, territorial integrity and independence, as well as for the principle of non-interference in internal affairs. Underlining the importance of adherence to the United Nations Charter, especially Article 1 on peaceful dispute settlement, he said Crimea was under Ukrainian sovereignty.
Kiribati	
Kuwait	
Latvia	The President of Latvia, Speaker of the parliament, Prime Minister and Foreign Minister issued a joint statement stating that "Latvia strongly stands for the territorial integrity of Ukraine and is of the opinion that any measures aimed at splitting Ukrainian society and questioning the territorial integrity of the country must be condemned in the strongest terms possible.". Foreign Minister Edgars Rinkēvičs said, "The Crimea scenario resembles the occupation of the Baltic states by the USSR in 1940. History repeats itself, first as tragedy, second as farce."
Liberia	
Libya	
Liechtenstein	On 5 March Foreign Minister Aurelia Frick in the name of the Liechtenstein Government expressed hope for a peaceful solution of the Crimean conflict and called for all parties to support the sovereignty of Ukraine.
Lithuania	The Foreign Ministry announced that it had called the Russian Ambassador to Lithuania to discuss the situation in Ukraine. President Dalia Grybauskaitė said that Russia was dangerous. "After Ukraine will be Moldova, and after Moldova will be different countries. They are trying to rewrite the borders after the Second World War in Europe."
Luxembourg	
Madagascar	
Malawi	
Maldives	
Malaysia	Malaysia through its Minister of Foreign Affairs said it viewed with deep concern the developments in Ukraine, particularly the situation in the Crimean peninsula. Given Malaysia's friendly relations with Russia and Ukraine, the country urged both to work towards a peaceful resolution of the issues between them. Malaysia also hopes that both sides would adopt a moderate approach and find a mutually acceptable solution. The interest, welfare and security of the people of Ukraine must be given top-most priority while taking into account the implications on the overall stability and peace in the region, it said. Malaysia also supported all peaceful efforts including international diplomatic initiatives aimed at resolving the crisis situation in Ukraine, and said all parties involved must respect the rule of law, act responsibly and aim towards finding a peaceful settlement.
Malta	
Marshall Islands	
Mauritius	
Mexico	On 4 March 2014, The foreign ministry issued a press release expressing Mexico's deep concern at the deteriorating situation in Ukraine and its support of calls for respect for Ukraine's national unity and territorial integrity, in accordance with the UN Charter and international law.
Micronesia
Moldova	On 2 March 2014, President Nicolae Timofti stated "Moldova underlines the importance of observing Ukraine's sovereignty and territorial integrity and not allowing violation of the international law principles.
Monaco	
Montenegro	On 5 March 2014, the government of Montenegro issued a statement condemning the "blatant violation of the sovereignty and territorial integrity of Ukraine and the aggression of Russian armed forces".
Netherlands	
New Zealand	On 3 March 2014, Prime Minister of New Zealand John Key, speaking on the morning news and talk show Breakfast, referred to the rising tensions in Ukraine as "deeply concerning". The Prime Minister further stated that while Russia had very real interests in Ukraine and Crimea specifically, he agreed with the American condemnation of Russia's actions, stressing that it would, "...be a disaster if there was a major problem in the Ukraine," and that the use of force was in nobody's interest.
Niger	
Nigeria	U. Joy Ogwo, Nigeria's representative on the UN Security Council, voted in favour of the US-backed resolution condemning the 16 March referendum; she voted in favour because the text embodied principles enshrined in the United Nations Charter, which obliged member states to settle disputes through peaceful means. Pointing out that the draft resolution was not a country-specific text, she said the pacific settlement of the territorial dispute between Nigeria and Cameroon through the International Court of Justice should serve as a beacon and that Nigeria opposed unilateral actions aimed at altering a country's configuration.
North Macedonia	The Foreign Ministry issued a statement expressing its growing concern over the escalation of violence in Ukraine. It called for undertaking all necessary measures to urgently ease of tensions, while underscoring the need for establishing political dialogue about all the problems the citizens of Ukraine face, the resolution of which necessitated involvement of all stakeholders. It also called for moderation and responsibility.
Norway	The Ministry of Foreign Affairs condemned the Russian military escalation in the Crimea, together with the NATO countries. "The Russian authorities must immediately meet the Ukrainian request for dialogue to resolve the crisis without violence," said Foreign Minister Børge Brende.
Palau	
Panama	
Papua New Guinea	
Peru	
Poland	On 1 March 2014, Poland "strongly appeal[ed] for respecting Ukraine's territorial integrity, and observing international law, including fundamental principles of the Organization for Security and Cooperation in Europe...We urge states-signatories to the Budapest Memorandum of December 1994, which gives Ukraine security assurances, to respect and fulfil their commitments," said the MFA statement. On 6 March 2014, Poland's Minister of Defence Tomasz Siemoniak announced the arrival of 12 American F-16 fighter jets with 300 personnel per Poland's request at NATO, which was granted by the Secretary of Defense Chuck Hagel. The situation in Ukraine, he said at a press conference, is extremely serious. The changing of guaranteed borders is not acceptable, neither is the blocking of the OBWE observers in Crimea. The F-16 aviation detachment AvDet is scheduled to station at the Air Force bases in Łask and Powidz. Poland's President Bronisław Komorowski visited the Air Force base in Łask with Siemoniak on Tuesday 11 March 2014 and pronounced the urgent necessity for further military spending on the multi-purpose F-16 programme. Polish Prime Minister Donald Tusk called for change in EU energy policy as Germany's dependence on Russian gas poses risks for Europe. On 11 March 2014 Tusk announced that the current situation in Crimea is only a phase in an ongoing crisis, but Poland cannot accept the territorial disintegration of sovereign Ukraine. On 29 August Polish Ministry of Foreign Affairs officially recognized "offensive action of the Russian armed forces in the southern regions of Donetsk oblast, in particular in the vicinity of the town of Nowoazowsk" as an aggression by international law.
Portugal	
Qatar	
Romania	On 2 March 2014, President Traian Băsescu said that any Russian military presence in Ukraine, without Ukraine's approval and beyond the limits of bilateral accords, would be seen as an act of aggression. On 6 March, the Romanian president took a stronger stance, declaring that 'what Russia has done in Ukraine is an aggression against that country.". He further stated that Romania which has the largest minority in Ukraine aside from Russia (c. 400.000 Romanian speaking Ukrainian citizens) should play an active role and do more to support US and European negotiations with Russia.
Rwanda	On 15 March, Rwandan ambassador Eugène-Richard Gasana voted for a resolution in the UN Security Council condemning the 16 March referendum. He said the timing of the draft resolution was not productive. It was the time for frank dialogue, rather than rhetoric that would isolate a country. The situations in Ukraine and Crimea had unfolded rapidly, and the pressure exerted by some countries had diverted attention away from careful analysis of their root causes. While Rwanda had still voted in favour of the text, which embodied important principles such as sovereignty, unity and territorial integrity, it urged Ukraine to launch an inclusive national dialogue, and the international community to help avoid further deterioration of the situation.
Samoa	
San Marino	
Saudi Arabia	
Seychelles	
Sierra Leone	
Singapore	On 5 March, Foreign Minister K Shanmugam spoke in the parliament outlining Singapores official position: "We strongly object to any unprovoked invasion of a sovereign country under any pretext or excuse. Russian troops should not be in Ukraine in breach of international law. The sovereignty and territorial integrity of Ukraine must be respected. International law must be respected. There can be no qualifications to this."
Slovakia	
Slovenia	Prime Minister Alenka Bratušek said that everything must be done to prevent a military conflict in Ukraine, while the ministry of foreign affairs offered to become a mediator for the EU.
Solomon Islands	
Somalia	
South Korea	On 15 March, the representative of the Republic of Korea to the UN Security Council, Oh Joon voted in favor of a US sponsored resolution condemning the 16 March referendum. He elaborated that he "had voted in favour of the text, which embodied important principles such as sovereignty, territorial integrity and unity. Those principles should be respected. Today's failure to adopt the text would not close the window to a diplomatic solution, he emphasized."
Spain	The Ministry of Foreign Affairs and Cooperation released a statement in support of the new Ukrainian government, saying the following: "The Spanish government is concerned about the situation in Ukraine, which remains uncertain and unstable. The current tension in Crimea is especially concerning". The government also expressed its "full support for the territorial integrity of Ukraine", and urged all actors to "cooperate in finding a solution, while dismissing any use of force".
Sweden	Prime Minister Fredrik Reinfeldt said 2 March in an interview on Sveriges Radio:"It's somewhat understandable that Russia is acting on concerns about the Russian minority of Crimea and eastern Ukraine, but not in the way they're doing it. There are of course methods for talking to the Ukrainian government and calming down the situation in that way." In an interview on 19 March, he said that the Russian leadership "are making as many errors as they can, breaking international law and the collective security structure we have built since the end of the Cold War. We ought to feel very worried about that." Foreign Minister Carl Bildt tweeted on 1 March, "Russian military intervention in Ukraine is clearly against international law and principles of European security." He added in an interview later the same day, "There is no doubt that what is happening now is a scarcely camouflaged Russian takeover of Crimea"
Switzerland	
Syria	The former Assad regime led by under President Bashar al-Assad had expressed support for Putin's efforts to "restore security and stability in the friendly country of Ukraine." The Assad regime had officially recognized Crimea as a part of Russia. Following the fall of the Assad regime a decade later, its unknown if the new transitional government would maintain or withdraw recognition. However following the restoration of Syrian–Ukrainian ties in 2025, the two countries began to improve relations from April 2026 and Syria under President Ahmed al-Sharaa has affirmed it respected Ukrainian territorial integrity.
Thailand	
Togo	
Trinidad and Tobago	
Tunisia	
Turkey	Foreign Minister Ahmet Davutoğlu stated on 28 February that "Turkey attaches importance to democracy and democracy-based political stability in Ukraine's future" and that "Crimea is important for Turkey as it is Turkey's door to Ukraine and it is also important for our Tatar compatriots." Turkish President Abdullah Gül stated on 5 March that the problems must be solved within international law and with respect for Ukraine's political union and borders. Turkish President Recep Tayyip Erdoğan said: "Unfortunately, throughout history, the right of the Crimean Tatar people to live in dignity in their own homeland was undermined with collective deportations and repression. Today we are witnessing the illegal annexation of the Crimea and other regrettable events," after meeting with Crimean leaders, International Business Times reported Monday, 3 August.
Turkmenistan	Turkmenistan was absent from the UN voting, but President Gurbanguly Berdimuhamedow supported Ukraine's territorial integrity in 2015.
United Kingdom	The Foreign Secretary William Hague said he was "deeply concerned" at the escalation of tensions and the decision of the Russian parliament to authorise military action. He also said "This action is a potentially grave threat to the sovereignty, independence and territorial integrity of Ukraine. We condemn any act of aggression against Ukraine". On 2 March 2014, British Prime Minister David Cameron announced that government officials were planning to boycott the 2014 Winter Paralympics in Sochi in response to the situation in Crimea, while Prince Edward cancelled plans to travel to Sochi for the Games "on the advice of government." These decisions will not affect Great Britain's participation in the Games. Cameron also said "No amount of sham and perverse democratic process or skewed historical references can make up for the fact that this is an incursion into a sovereign state and a land grab of part of its territory with no respect for the law of that country or for international law."
United States	On 28 February, President Barack Obama released a statement warning Russia not to intervene in Crimea. The statement said that President Obama was "deeply concerned by reports of military movements taken by the Russian Federation inside of Ukraine." It added that "any violation of Ukraine's sovereignty and territorial integrity would be deeply destabilizing, which is not in the interest of Ukraine, Russia, or Europe" and that it would be "a clear violation of Russia's commitment to respect the independence and sovereignty and borders of Ukraine, and of international laws." On 1 March, Obama held a phone conversation with Putin and said that the Russian invasion was a "violation of Ukrainian sovereignty and territorial integrity ... [and a] breach of international law." He warned of "greater political and economic isolation" and threatened to withdraw the United States from the 40th G8 summit chaired by Russia. Secretary of State John Kerry condemned Russia's "invasion" of Ukraine on 2 March in an interview for Face the Nation. He called it an "incredible act of aggression," and said that "You just don't in the 21st century behave in 19th century fashion by invading another country on completely trumped up pre-text". On 3 March, National Security Council spokeswoman Caitlin Hayden announced that the United States would not send a presidential delegation to the 2014 Winter Paralympics in Sochi (which was to have been led by Tammy Duckworth), "in addition to other measures we are taking in response to the situation in Ukraine." As with the British boycott effort, it would not affect the country's participation in the Games themselves. On 6 March, Obama signed Executive Order 13660, Blocking Property of Certain Persons Contributing to the Situation in Ukraine, authorizing sanctions against persons who, as determined by the Secretary of the Treasury in consultation with the Secretary of State, have violated or assisted in the violation of Ukraine's sovereignty. On 17 March, Obama signed Executive Order 13661, Blocking Property of Additional Persons Contributing to the Situation in Ukraine, which expanded the scope of the previous sanctions imposed by EO 13660, to include the freezing of certain Russian government officials' assets in the US and blocking their entry into the US. The 113th United States Congress considered several different pieces of legislation that would offer Ukraine different levels of loan guarantees, aid, and apply sanctions "against anyone deemed by the president to have undermined Ukraine's security or independence, or to have engaged in corruption in Ukraine or Russia." Those bills included the bill To provide for the costs of loan guarantees for Ukraine (H.R. 4152; 113th Congress), the Support for the Sovereignty, Integrity, Democracy, and Economic Stability of Ukraine Act of 2014 (S. 2124; 113th Congress), and the Ukraine Support Act (H.R. 4278; 113th Congress). All three bills were introduced and considered in March 2014. On 3 April, the United States Department of Energy informed the Russian state-run nuclear corporation Rosatom of the suspension of several peaceful nuclear cooperation projects.
Uruguay	

The following non UN-member states have also voiced support for Ukraine's claim on the territory:

State	Notes
Kosovo	The Ministry of Foreign Affairs condemned what it termed the "occupation of Ukrainian territory, and the violation of Ukrainian sovereignty and territorial integrity in full contravention of Russia's obligations under the UN Charter, the Helsinki Final Act and the 1994 Budapest Memorandum."
Republic of China	On 4 March, the Ministry of Foreign Affairs issued a statement that read: "The ROC government calls on all parties concerned to respect Ukraine's sovereignty, territorial integrity, political independence and democracy. We urge parties to begin negotiations as soon as possible, so as to peacefully resolve disputes in accordance with international law, prevent tensions from rising further, and work together to advance peace and stability in the region."

In addition to most states listed above, the following states voted for resolution A/73/L.47, affirming the General Assembly's commitment to the territorial integrity of Ukraine within its internationally recognized borders and condemning the Kerch Strait incident.

State	Notes
Antigua and Barbuda	
Belize	
Botswana	
Djibouti	
Guyana	
Israel	
Tuvalu	
Vanuatu	

Withdrawn

State	Notes
Central African Republic	

==== Other positions ====
State	Notes
Bosnia and Herzegovina	On 2 March, Foreign Minister Zlatko Lagumdžija called for "Immediate calming of tensions as a key prerequisite for the maintenance of peace, security, sovereignty and territorial integrity of Ukraine as a full member of the UN" and said that "Sovereign Ukraine and its people have the right to define their own future, peacefully and through democratic dialogue, which guarantees stability and the international community has a duty and an obligation to support this". However, president of the autonomous region of Srpska, Milorad Dodik voiced support for Crimea, stating "The will of the people must be respected".
China	The People's Republic of China's stance on Crimea is based upon its longstanding policy of official noninterference in the domestic affairs of other nations. China sees the Crimean problem as an issue that should be solved within Ukraine. And thus, China argues that neither the involvement of Russia nor NATO is legitimate. In the United Nations, China abstained from a resolution condemning the referendum in Crimea as illegal. China does not recognize Russia's annexation of Crimea and recognizes Crimea as a part of Ukraine.
India	The Indian government took a relatively balanced position on the situation in Ukraine. India in the past has not historically made supporting democracy abroad a central tenet of its foreign policy and said in its official statement that they would observe the situation in Ukraine and respect the decisions of both sides as long as they are peaceful. The Ministry of External Affairs asked its nationals, particularly students, to leave the Donetsk and Luhansk regions, effective from 29 May 2014, in eastern Ukraine which is witnessing frequent violent clashes and warned Indian travelers to be cautious and avoid non-essential travel in parts of eastern and southern Ukraine and to remain vigilant about their personal safety and security. According to officials, there were about 1,000 non-resident Indians living in the affected regions.
Kazakhstan	Kazakhstan viewed the referendum held in Crimea "as a free expression of will of the Autonomous Republic's population". In 2022, Kazakh President Kassym-Jomart Tokayev refused to recognize the de facto status of Crimea in a direct clash with Putin at the 2022 St. Petersburg Economic Forum. Additionally, he stated that Kazakhstan would not recognize the "quasi-republics" of the Donetsk PR or Luhansk PR.
Pakistan	Foreign Ministry spokesperson Tasnim Aslam, in a weekly press briefing, expressed hope that the political crisis in Ukraine would be resolved through peaceful means and stated that talks and diplomacy were the only option to calm down the situation.
Palestine	Palestinian Ambassador to Russia Abdel Hafiz Nofal said in an interview with the media that the people of Crimea "have the right to self-determination," and Palestine itself "supports Russia's actions on this issue." However, soon the Palestinian diplomatic service refuted the ambassador's words, stating that Nofal did not make any statements on the status of the Crimea.
Serbia	On 5 November, the Foreign Ministry issued a statement that it was "it once again wishes to reiterate that Serbia supports the territorial integrity and sovereignty of Ukraine." The statement by the Ministry of Foreign Affairs said that Serbia also supported the continuation of the peace process, with the firm belief that only dialogue can lead to a solution in accordance with international law and respect for the UN Charter.
Uzbekistan	Uzbekistan's reaction towards the annexation was initially to condemn the actions of Russia. However in 2018, Uzbekistan voted against a resolution pertaining to Crimea.
Vietnam	On 5 March, Le Hai Binh, a spokesman for the Foreign Ministry of Vietnam, stated "We hope that stability will soon be restored in Ukraine and that all issues will be resolved by law, for the sake of Ukrainian people, and of peace and development in the region and the world over."

== See also ==
- Russia–Ukraine relations
- Russia–Ukraine border and Russia–Ukraine barrier
- International reactions to the annexation of Crimea by the Russian Federation
- International sanctions during the Russo-Ukrainian War
- Russian-occupied territories of Ukraine
- Crimea Platform
- International recognition of the Donetsk People's Republic and the Luhansk People's Republic
