= 1994 Crimean referendum =

Ukrainian referendums

A three-part referendum was held in Crimea on 27 March 1994 alongside regional and national elections. Voters were asked whether they were in favour of greater autonomy within Ukraine, whether residents should have dual Russian and Ukrainian citizenship, and whether presidential decrees should have the status of laws. All three proposals were approved.

== Background ==
On 5 May 1992 the Crimean Supreme Council declared independence, dependent on a referendum that was planned for August. However, the Ukrainian Parliament ruled that the declaration was illegal, and gave the Supreme Council a deadline of 20 May to rescind it. Although the Supreme Council complied with the order on 22 May, the referendum was only postponed rather than cancelled.

The referendum idea was resurrected in 1994 after Yuriy Meshkov was elected President of Crimea in January. Although the Central Election Commission of Ukraine and Ukrainian President Leonid Kravchuk declared it illegal, it still went ahead on 27 March.

== Results ==
=== Greater autonomy ===
Are you for the restoration of the provision of the Constitution of the Republic of Crimea of 6 May 1992 which determines the regulation of mutual relations between the Republic of Crimea and Ukraine on the basis of a Treaty of Agreements?

Choice	Votes	%
For		78.4
Against		21.6
Invalid/blank votes		–
Total		100
Registered voters/turnout		
Source: Minorities at Risk Project

=== Dual citizenship ===
Are you for the restoration of the provision of the Constitution of the Republic of Crimea of 6 May 1992 that proclaimed the right of citizens of the Republic of Crimea to dual citizenship?

Choice	Votes	%
For		82.8
Against		17.2
Invalid/blank votes		–
Total		100
Registered voters/turnout		
Source: Minorities at Risk Project

=== Edicts of the president to become laws ===
Are you for conceding the force of laws to the edicts of the president of the Republic of Crimea on questions that are temporarily not regulated by legislation of the Republic of Crimea?

Choice	Votes	%
For		77.9
Against		22.1
Invalid/blank votes		–
Total		100
Registered voters/turnout		
Source: Minorities at Risk Project
