= Crimean referendum =

Crimean referendum may refer to:

- 1991 Crimean sovereignty referendum, on whether to re-establish the Crimean Autonomous Soviet Socialist Republic
- 1994 Crimean referendum, on whether voters were in favour of greater autonomy within Ukraine
- 2014 Crimean referendum, on whether Crimea should join Russia or remain part of Ukraine
