= Constitution of the Autonomous Republic of Crimea =

1998 basic law of the Autonomous Republic of Crimea, Ukraine

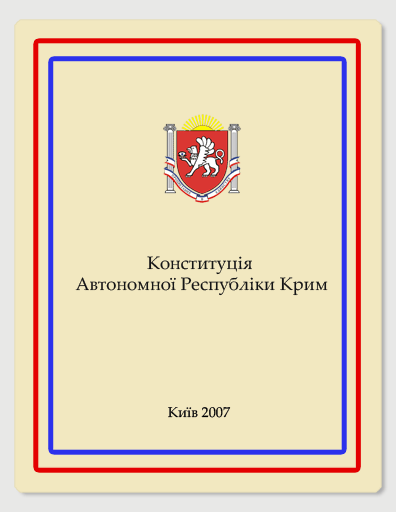
- Ratified: 21 October 1998 (Crimea); 23 December 1998 (Ukraine)
- Repealed: 11 April 2014 (de facto not de jure)
- Purpose: Establishing Crimea's status within Ukraine

The Constitution of the Autonomous Republic of Crimea (Ukrainian: Конституція Автономної Республіки Крим Konstytutsiya Avtonomnoyi Respubliky Krym; Russian: Конституция Автономной Республики Крым Konstitutsiya Avtonomnoy Respubliki Krym) is the basic law of the Autonomous Republic of Crimea, a republic on the Crimean peninsula as part of Ukraine. The constitution establishes the republic's status and authority within Ukraine. It granted Crimea the right to draft a budget and manage its own property.

During the 2014 Crimean crisis, a disputed referendum led to the repeal of the constitution by the Crimean government, as part of the process by which the territory was annexed by Russia as the Republic of Crimea. The Ukrainian government has not recognized this annexation, and still recognizes the constitution as active.

== 1992 Constitution ==
After a referendum on 20 January 1991, Crimea regained its status as an Autonomous Soviet Socialist Republic. As this was months before August's Declaration of Independence of Ukraine Crimea was at the time part of the Ukrainian SSR which was one of the constituent republics of the Soviet Union.

In 26 February 1992, the Crimean parliament changed the name of the region from the Crimean ASSR into the Republic of Crimea. On 5 May 1992, parliament declared Crimea independent, which was yet to be approved by a referendum to be held 2 August 1992. On 6 May 1992, the same parliament inserted a new sentence into this constitution stating that Crimea was part of Ukraine. The Ukrainian parliament convened on May 15, annulled the Crimean declaration of independence and gave the Crimean parliament one week to cancel the referendum. In June 1992, the parties reached a compromise, Crimea would be designated the status of "Autonomous Republic" and granted special economic status, contingent on Crimea's amendment of its constitution including proclaiming the peninsula an autonomous integral part of Ukraine. The revised Constitution of Crimea was adopted on September 25, 1992.

== Drafting of a new constitution ==
In May 1994, the Crimean parliament voted to restore the May 1992 Constitution. In September 1994, President of Crimea Yuriy Meshkov and parliament decided to write a new constitution. On 17 March 1995, the Verkhovna Rada abolished the May 1992 Constitution and the post of President of Crimea. From June until September 1995, Ukrainian President Leonid Kuchma governed Crimea under a direct presidential administration decree. In October 1995, the Crimean parliament adopted a new Constitution which was not recognized by the Ukrainian national authorities until April 1996 when significant amendments were suggested. A fifth draft law of the October 1995 constitution was ratified on 21 October 1998 at the second session of the Crimean Verkhovna Rada (parliament). The Verkhovna Rada confirmed this constitution on 23 December 1998. (Article 135 of the Ukrainian Constitution provides that the Crimean Constitution must be approved by the Ukrainian parliament.) It came into effect on 12 January 1999.

During the annexation of Crimea by the Russian Federation, the Crimean authority repealed the 1998 Crimean Constitution after the 2014 Crimean status referendum.

== Anomalies ==
The Crimean parliament had no right of legislative initiative.
