= Anti-NATO =

Anti-NATO may refer to:

- List of Anti-NATO parties and organizations
- Anti-NATO (group in the Russian State Duma)
