= 1992 Crimean constitution =

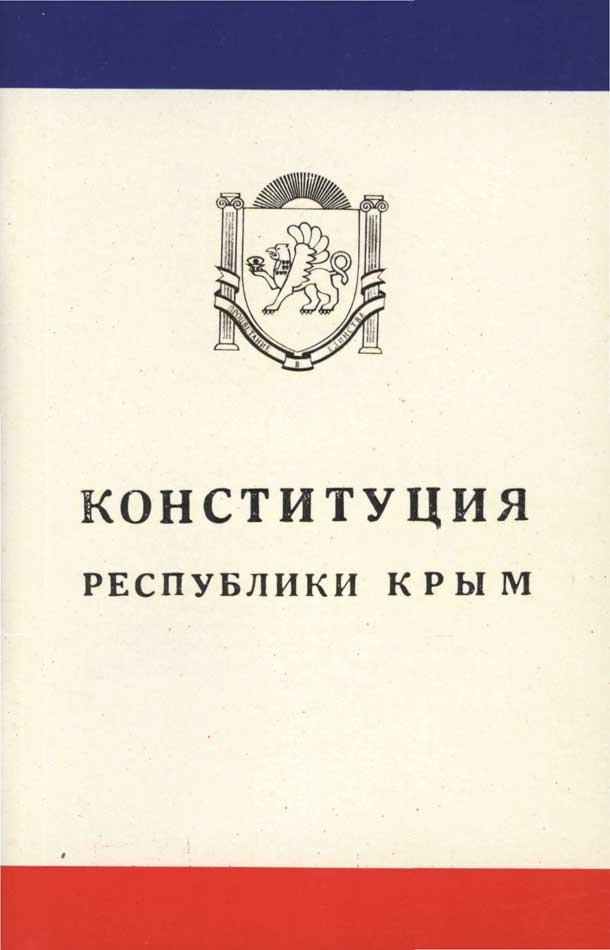
Constitution of the Republic of Crimea.

After a referendum on 20 January 1991, Crimea regained its status as an Autonomous Soviet Socialist Republic. As this was months before the Declaration of Independence of Ukraine on 24 August 1991 — by December 1991 internationally recognized — Crimea was at the time part of the Ukrainian SSR which was one of the constituent republics of the Soviet Union.

On 26 February 1992, the Crimean parliament changed the name of the region from the Crimean ASSR into the Republic of Crimea. On 5 May 1992, parliament declared Crimea independent and adopted a constitution, which was yet to be approved by a referendum to be held 2 August 1992. On 6 May 1992, the same parliament inserted a new sentence into this constitution stating that Crimea was part of Ukraine. The Ukrainian parliament convened on May 15, annulled the Crimean declaration of independence and gave the Crimean parliament one week to cancel the referendum. In June 1992, the parties reached a compromise, Crimea would be designated the status of "Autonomous Republic" and granted special economic status, contingent on Crimea's amendment of its constitution including proclaiming the peninsula an autonomous integral part of Ukraine. The revised Constitution of Crimea was adopted on September 25, 1992.

In May 1994, the Crimean parliament voted to restore the May 1992 Constitution although this was abandoned by September of that year.

In March 2014, following its capture by Russian soldiers, the Crimean Parliament proposed a referendum to whether Crimea should apply to join Russia as a federal subject or restore the 1992 Crimean constitution - and so remain within Ukraine with considerable autonomy. According to the official results, the vote was to join Russia. The referendum was later declared invalid by the United Nations General Assembly Resolution 68/262.

== See also ==
- Political status of Crimea
- Constitution of the Autonomous Republic of Crimea
