= 1994 Crimean parliamentary election =

Parliamentary elections were held in Crimea on 27 March 1994. The result was a victory for Russia Bloc, which won 57 of the 100 seats in the Supreme Council.

== Results ==
Party	Seats
Russia Bloc	57
Qurultay of the Crimean Tatar People	16
Party of Economic Revival	3
Communist Party of Ukraine	2
Republican Party of Crimea	2
Independents	20
Total	100
Source: Parties and Elections
