= Anatoliy Franchuk =

Ukrainian politician (1935–2021)

- Анатолій Франчук
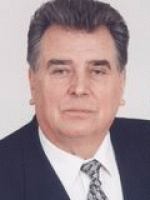
- Official portrait, 2002

Prime Minister of Crimea
- In office 6 October 1994 – 26 January 1996
- Preceded by: Borys Samsonov
- Succeeded by: Arkadiy Demydenko
- In office 4 June 1997 – 27 May 1998
- Preceded by: Arkadiy Demydenko
- Succeeded by: Serhiy Kunitsyn

Minister of Economy of Crimea
- In office 22 March 1991 – 17 September 1993
- Succeeded by: Tetyana Shandra

People's Deputy of Ukraine
- In office 11 May 1995 – 25 May 2006

Personal details
- Born: 8 September 1935 Volodymyrivka, Ukrainian SSR, Soviet Union (now Ukraine)
- Died: 7 July 2021 (aged 85)
- Party: Revival

Anatoliy Romanovych Franchuk (Ukrainian: Анатолій Романович Франчук; 8 September 1935 – 7 July 2021) was a Ukrainian politician.

== Biography ==
Franchuk graduated from the Krasnoyarsk State Technical University in 1961 and the Academy of National Economy in 1980. After serving in the Soviet Army and holding various engineering jobs within the USSR, he became Minister of Economy of the Republic of Crimea from 1991 to 1993. In 1994 the Ukrainian President Leonid Kuchma, a family friend, appointed him as Prime Minister of Crimea against the elected separatist President of Crimea, Yuriy Meshkov. He eventually exercised power in Crimea in 1995 after the Ukrainian National Guard forcibly expelled Meshkov from Crimea. He served until 1996 and again served from 1997 to 1998.

As a member of the Revival party, he served in the Verkhovna Rada from 1995 to 2006.

His son, Ihor Franchuk, was married to Olena Pinchuk, the daughter of former President Leonid Kuchma. and headed Naftogaz.

Anatoliy Franchuk died on 7 July 2021 at the age of 85.

== Awards ==
- Order of Lenin
- Order of the October Revolution
- Order of the Red Banner of Labour
- USSR State Prize
- Master of Sport of the USSR, International Class
