= Autonomous Republic of Crimea =

De jure autonomous republic of Ukraine

Coordinates: 45.3°N 34.4°E

Autonomous Republic of Crimea: Автономна Республіка Крим; Автономная Республика Крым; Qırım Muhtar Cumhuriyeti
- Autonomous republic (Note: Annexed by Russia as the Republic of Crimea)
- Flag Coat of arms
- Anthem: State Anthem of Crimea
- Autonomous Republic of Crimea within Ukraine (pre-2023)

- Location of the Autonomous Republic of Crimea (light yellow) in the Crimean Peninsula
- Sovereign state: Ukraine
- Autonomy: 12 February 1991
- Constitution: 21 October 1998
- Russian occupation: 20 February 2014 (Note: In 2015 the Ukrainian parliament officially set 20 February 2014 as the date of "the beginning of the temporary occupation of Crimea and Sevastopol by Russia.")
- Annexed by Russia: 18 March 2014
- Administrative centre: Simferopol
- Official languages: Ukrainian, Russian, Crimean Tatar
- Ethnic groups (2001): 60.12% Russians; 25.78% Ukrainians; 14.1% Crimean Tatars
- Government: Autonomous republic
  - Presidential Representative: Olha Kuryshko
- Legislature: Supreme Council (suspended in 2014)

Area
  - Total: 26,100 km^{2} (10,100 sq mi)

Population
  - 2001 census: 2,033,700
  - Density: 77.9/km^{2} (201.8/sq mi)
- ISO 3166 code: UA-43
- NUTS statistical regions of Ukraine: UA44

The Autonomous Republic of Crimea (Note: Ukrainian: Автономна Республіка Крим; Avtonomna Respublika Krym; Russian: Автономная Республика Крым; Avtonomnaya Respublika Krym; Crimean Tatar: Qırım Muhtar Cumhuriyeti) is a de jure administrative division of Ukraine encompassing most of Crimea that was unilaterally annexed by Russia in 2014, and is now, de facto, administered as the Republic of Crimea within the Russian Federation. The Autonomous Republic of Crimea encompasses most of the peninsula, while the City of Sevastopol (a city with special status within Ukraine) occupies the rest.

The Cimmerians, Scythians, Greeks, Goths, Huns, Bulgars, Khazars, Byzantine Greeks, the state of Kievan Rus', Kipchaks, Italians, and Golden Horde Mongols and Tatars each controlled Crimea in its earlier history. In the 13th century, it was partly controlled by the Venetians and by the Genoese, and in the late 15th century, it was partly under Polish suzerainty. They were followed by the Crimean Khanate and the Ottoman Empire in the 15th to 18th centuries, the Russian Empire in the 18th to 20th centuries, Germany during World War II, and the Russian Soviet Federative Socialist Republic, and later the Ukrainian Soviet Socialist Republic, within the Soviet Union during the rest of the 20th century until Crimea became part of independent Ukraine with the breakup of the Soviet Union in 1991.

After the Revolution of Dignity in February 2014, Russian troops took control of the territory. Russia formally annexed Crimea on 18 March 2014, incorporating the Republic of Crimea and the federal city of Sevastopol as the 84th and 85th federal subjects of Russia. While Russia and 17 other UN member states recognize Crimea as part of the Russian Federation, Ukraine continues to claim Crimea as an integral part of its territory, supported by most foreign governments and United Nations General Assembly Resolution 68/262.

The Autonomous Republic of Crimea, an autonomous parliamentary republic within Ukraine, was governed by the Constitution of Crimea in accordance with the laws of Ukraine. The capital and administrative seat of the republic's government, the city of Simferopol, is located in the centre of the peninsula. Crimea's area is 26,200 square kilometres (10,100 sq mi) and its population was 1,973,185 as of 2007. These figures do not include the area and population of the City of Sevastopol (2007 population: 379,200), which is administratively separate from the autonomous republic. The peninsula was therefore estimated to have 2,352,385 people in 2007.

At the time of the 2001 Ukrainian population census, 58% of the population of Crimea were ethnic Russians and 24% ethnic Ukrainians, with the region also having the highest proportion of Muslims in Ukraine. Crimean Tatars, a predominantly Muslim ethnic minority who in 2001 made up 12.10% of the population, formed in Crimea in the late Middle Ages, after the Crimean Khanate had come into existence. The Crimean Tatars were forcibly expelled to Central Asia by Joseph Stalin's government. After the fall of the Soviet Union, Crimean Tatars began to return to the region.

== History ==
=== Background ===
The Crimean Autonomous Soviet Socialist Republic was established as part of the Russian Soviet Federative Socialist Republic in 1921, with the latter joining with other republics to form the Soviet Union. Following the end of Nazi occupation during World War II, indigenous Crimean Tatars were forcibly deported and the autonomous republic was abolished in 1945, replaced with an oblast-level jurisdiction. In 1954, Crimea Oblast was transferred to the jurisdiction of the Ukrainian SSR. Shortly prior to the dissolution of the Soviet Union, Crimea was granted the status of Autonomous Republic by the Supreme Soviet of the Ukrainian SSR following a state-sanctioned referendum held on January 20, 1991. When Ukraine became independent, Crimea remained a republic within the country, leading to tensions between Russia and Ukraine as the Black Sea Fleet was based on the peninsula.

=== Post-Soviet years ===
Since Ukrainian independence, more than 250,000 Crimean Tatars have returned and integrated into the region.

Between 1992 and 1995, a struggle about the division of powers between the Crimean and Ukrainian authorities ensued. On 26 February, the Crimean parliament renamed the ASSR the Republic of Crimea. Then on 5 May, it proclaimed self-government and twice enacted constitutions that the Ukrainian government and Parliament refused to accept on the grounds that it was inconsistent with Ukraine's constitution. Finally in June 1992, the parties reached a compromise: Crimea would be given the status of "autonomous republic" and granted special economic status, as an autonomous but integral part of Ukraine.

In October 1993, the Crimean parliament established the post of president of Crimea. Tensions rose in 1994 with election of separatist leader Yury Meshkov as Crimean president. On 17 March 1995, the parliament of Ukraine abolished the Crimean constitution of May 1992, all the laws and decrees contradicting those of Kyiv, and also removed Yuriy Meshkov, the then president of Crimea, along with the office itself. After an interim constitution, the 1998 Constitution of the Autonomous Republic of Crimea was put into effect, changing the territory's name to the Autonomous Republic of Crimea.

=== Formation of the autonomous republic ===
Following the ratification of the May 1997 Russian–Ukrainian Friendship Treaty, in which Russia recognized Ukraine's borders and sovereignty over Crimea, international tensions slowly eased. However, in 2006, anti-NATO protests broke out on the peninsula. In September 2008, the Ukrainian foreign minister Volodymyr Ohryzko accused Russia of giving out Russian passports to the population in Crimea and described it as a "real problem" given Russia's declared policy of military intervention abroad to protect Russian citizens.

On 24 August 2009, anti-Ukrainian demonstrations were held in Crimea by ethnic Russian residents. Sergei Tsekov (of the Russian Bloc and then deputy speaker of the Crimean parliament) said then that he hoped that Russia would treat Crimea the same way as it had treated South Ossetia and Abkhazia. The 2010 Ukrainian–Russian Naval Base for Natural Gas treaty extended Russia's lease on naval facilities in Crimea until 2042, with optional five-year renewals.

=== Occupation and annexation by Russia ===
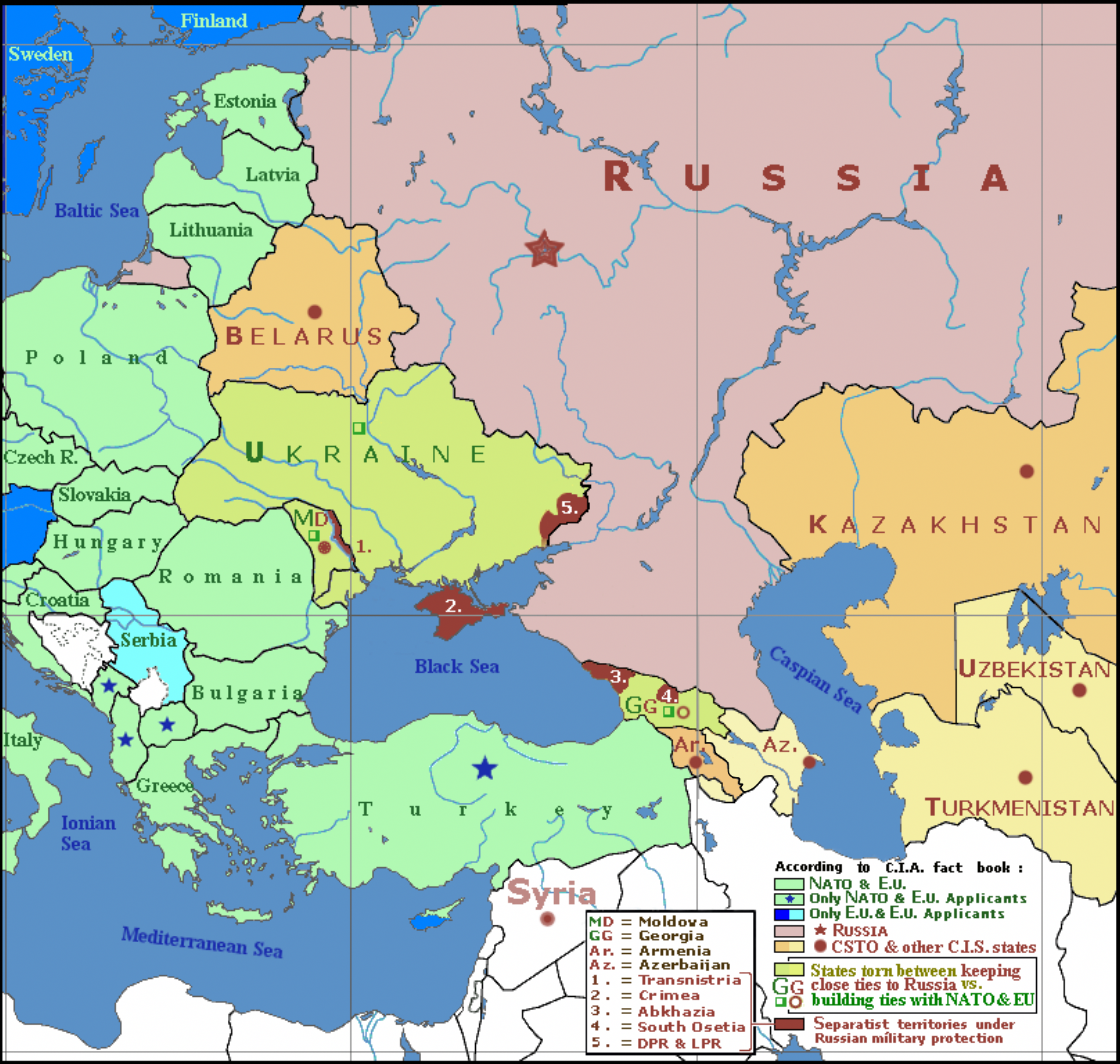
Geopolitics of Crimea, March 2014.

Crimea voted strongly for the pro-Russian Ukrainian president Viktor Yanukovych and his Party of Regions in presidential and parliamentary elections, and his ousting on 22 February 2014 during the 2014 Ukrainian revolution was followed by a push by pro-Russian protesters for Crimea to secede from Ukraine and seek assistance from Russia.

On 28 February 2014, Russian forces occupied airports and other strategic locations in Crimea though the Russian foreign ministry stated that "movement of the Black Sea Fleet armored vehicles in Crimea (...) happens in full accordance with basic Russian-Ukrainian agreements on the Black Sea Fleet". Gunmen, either armed militants or Russian special forces, occupied the Crimean parliament and, under armed guard with doors locked, members of parliament elected Sergey Aksyonov as the new Crimean prime minister. Aksyonov then said that he asserted sole control over Crimea's security forces and appealed to Russia "for assistance in guaranteeing peace and calmness" on the peninsula. The interim government of Ukraine described events as an invasion and occupation and did not recognize the Aksyonov administration as legal. Ousted Ukrainian president Viktor Yanukovych sent a letter to Putin asking him to use military force in Ukraine to restore law and order. On 1 March, the Russian parliament granted president Vladimir Putin the authority to use such force. Three days later, several Ukrainian bases and navy ships in Crimea reported being intimidated by Russian forces and Ukrainian warships were also effectively blockaded in Sevastopol.

On 6 March, the Crimean parliament asked the Russian government for the region to become a subject of the Russian Federation with a Crimea-wide referendum on the issue set for 16 March. The Ukrainian government, the European Union, and the US all challenged the legitimacy of the request and of the proposed referendum as article 73 of the constitution of Ukraine states: "Alterations to the territory of Ukraine shall be resolved exclusively by an all-Ukrainian referendum." International monitors arrived in Ukraine to assess the situation but were halted by armed militants at the Crimean border.

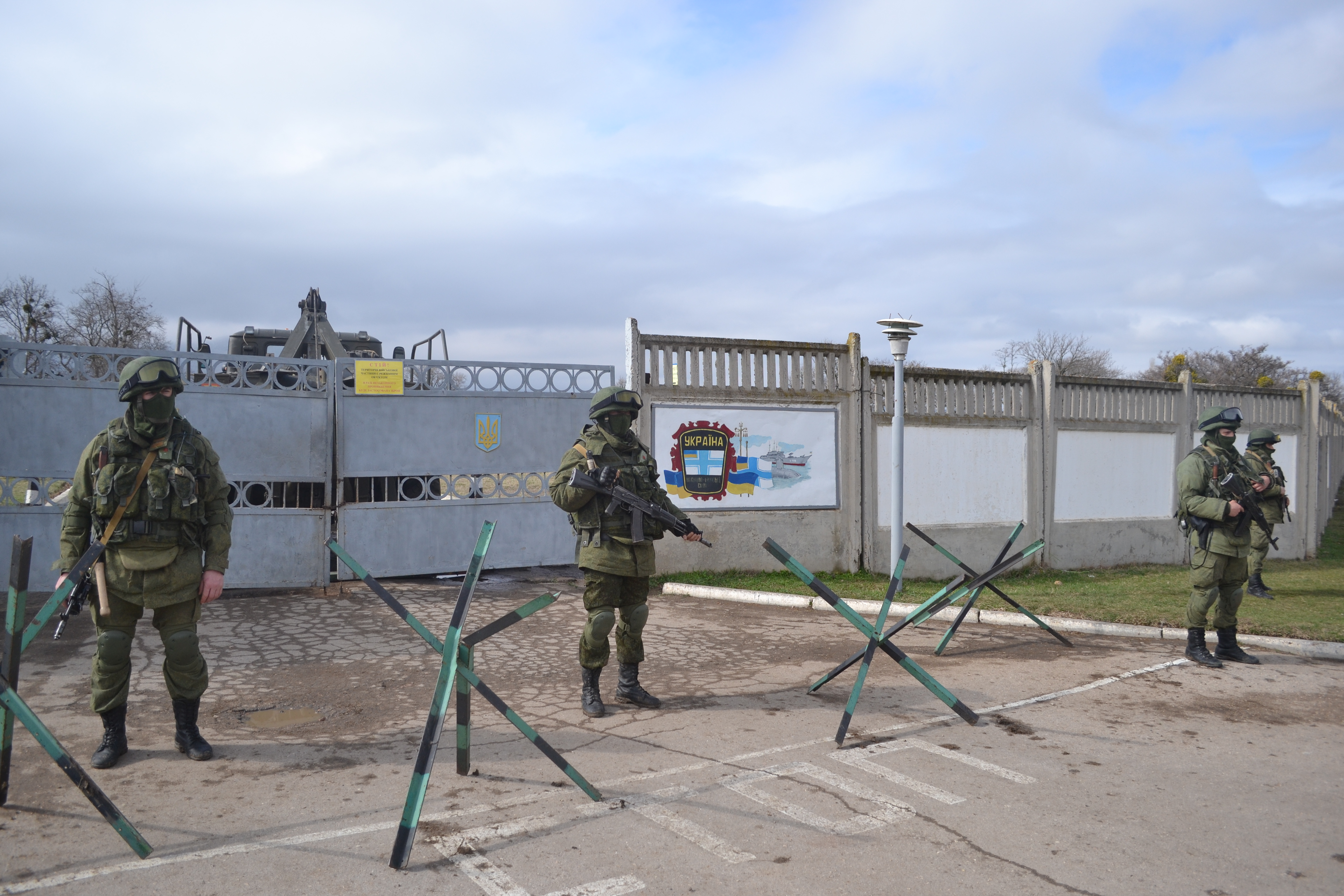
Ukrainian military base at Perevalne surrounded by Russian troops without military rank insignia or cockade on 9 March 2014.

The day before the referendum, Ukraine's national parliament voted to dissolve the Supreme Council of Crimea as its pro-Moscow leaders were finalising preparations for the vote.

The 16 March referendum required voters to choose between "Do you support rejoining Crimea with Russia as a subject of the Russian Federation?" and "Do you support restoration of the 1992 Constitution of the Autonomous Republic of Crimea and Crimea's status as a part of Ukraine?" There was no option on the ballot to maintain the status quo. However, support for the second question would have restored the republic's autonomous status within Ukraine. The official turnout for the referendum was 83% and according to official Russian data, the overwhelming majority of those who voted (95.5%) supported the option of rejoining Russia. However, a BBC reporter claimed that a huge number of Tatars and Ukrainians had abstained from the vote, while other sources called the referendum a "sham vote", citing clear contradictions between public opinion records and the official results of the referendum, as well as Russia's refusal to allow international observers access to polling stations on the peninsula, and significant civil opposition during the days leading up to the referendum.

Following the referendum, the members of the Supreme Council voted to rename themselves the State Council of the Republic of Crimea and also formally appealed to Russia to accept Crimea as part of the Russian Federation. This was granted and on 18 March 2014 the self-proclaimed Republic of Crimea signed a treaty of accession to the Russian Federation though the accession was granted separately for each of the former regions that composed it: one accession for the Republic of Crimea, and another for Sevastopol as a federal city. On 24 March 2014 the Ukrainian government ordered the full withdrawal of all of its armed forces from Crimea and two days later the last Ukrainian military bases and Ukrainian navy ships were captured by Russian troops. (Note: (Also) on 24 March 2014, the Ukrainian Ministry of Defense stated that approximately 50% of the Ukrainian soldiers in Crimea had defected to the Russian military.)

Ukraine, meanwhile, continues to claim Crimea as its territory and in 2015 the Ukrainian parliament designated 20 February 2014 as the (official) date of the start of "the temporary occupation of Crimea." On 27 March 2014 100 United Nations member states voted for United Nations General Assembly Resolution 68/262 affirming the General Assembly's commitment to the territorial integrity of Ukraine within its internationally recognized borders while 11 member states voted against, 58 abstained and 24 member states absented. Since then six countries (Cuba, Nicaragua, Venezuela, Syria, Afghanistan, and North Korea) have publicly recognized Russia's annexation of Crimea while others have stated support for the 16 March 2014 Crimean referendum.

== Demographics ==
At the Ukrainian national census in 2001, the region had a population of 2,033,700 inhabitants, with the highest percentage of Muslims in all of Ukraine.

The population was also diverse in terms of ethnicities: the Autonomous Republic of Crimea was the only subdivsion in Ukraine, apart from the adjoining City of Sevastopol, in which ethnic Russians made up the largest group, accounting for more than half of the population. The Russian population was mainly concentrated in the east and center of the peninsula, as well as on the Crimean Riviera and in urban areas. Ethnic Ukrainians made up the second-largest ethnic group and were the dominant ethnic group in the north of the region, but also constituted majorities in many rural areas in other parts of peninsula, especially in the west, south, as well as in the center. They were the largest group in the Perekopsk and Pervomaiske districts, while the respective Ukrainian and Russian populations in the Rozdolne district were of equal size. Crimean Tatars were the third-largest group, living mainly in the central and eastern parts of the peninsula, as well as in the northern districts. Other minorities were Belarusians, Armenians and Tatars. The exact ethnic composition in 2001 was as follows:

Ethnic groups (2001)
	percent
Russians	58.5%
Ukrainians	25.4%
Crimean Tatars	12.1%
Belarusians	1.5%
Tatars	0.5%
Armenians	0.4%
Jews	0.2%
Poles	0.2%

Source: National composition of the population. 2001 Ukrainian Population Census. State Statistics Committee of Ukraine'

Linguistically, the region was mostly Russian-speaking, although rural areas in the north and west were often Ukrainophone. Russian was the most common native language among most people without an ethnic Russian background. For instance, 59.5% of the ethnic Ukrainian population in Crimea spoke Russian as their first language. The only exception were Crimean Tatars, of whom 93% spoke the Crimean Tatar language natively, while 5,9% spoke Russian. The exact linguistic composition was as follows:

First languages (2001)
	percent
Russian	77.0%
Crimean Tatar	11.4%
Ukrainian	10.1%
others	1.5%

== Government and administration ==
Executive power in the Autonomous Republic of Crimea was exercised by the Council of Ministers of Crimea, headed by a Chairman, appointed and dismissed by the Supreme Council of Crimea, with the consent of the President of Ukraine. Though not an official body, the Mejlis of the Crimean Tatar People could address grievances to the Ukrainian central government, the Crimean government, and international bodies.

An administrative reform, enacted by the Verkhovna Rada on 17 July 2020, envisages redivision of the Autonomous Republic of Crimea into 10 enlarged raions (districts), into which cities (municipalities) of republican significance will be absorbed. Originally the reform was delayed until return of the peninsula under Ukrainian control, but it came into effect on 7 September 2023. Since the reform, the following are the de jure subdivisions of the republic:

1. Bakhchysarai Raion (Bağçasaray rayonı) — composed of Bakhchysarai Raion and parts of territory that earlier was subordinated to the Sevastopol municipality (without the Sevastopol city proper and also without Balaklava as such that exists within the Sevastopol city limits within the framework of Ukrainian legislation),
2. Bilohirsk Raion (Qarasuvbazar rayonı) — composed of Bilohirsk and Nyzhniohirsk raions,
3. Dzhankoi Raion (Canköy rayonı) — composed of Dzhankoi Raion and former Dzhankoi municipality,
4. Yevpatoria Raion (Kezlev rayonı) — composed of Saky and Chornomorske raions and former Yevpatoria and Saky municipalities,
5. Kerch Raion (Keriç rayonı) — composed of Lenine Raion and former Kerch municipality,
6. Kurman Raion (Qurman rayonı) — composed of Krasnohvardiysky and Pervomaisk raions,
7. Perekop Raion (Or Qapı rayonı) — composed of Krasnoperekopsk and Rozdolne raions, former Armiansk and Krasnoperekopsk municipalities,
8. Simferopol Raion (Aqmescit rayonı) — composed of Simferopol Raion and former Simferopol municipality,
9. Feodosia Raion (Kefe rayonı) — composed of Kirovske and Sovietskyi raions, former Feodosia and Sudak municipalities,
10. Yalta Raion (Yalta rayonı) — composed of former Yalta and Alushta municipalities.
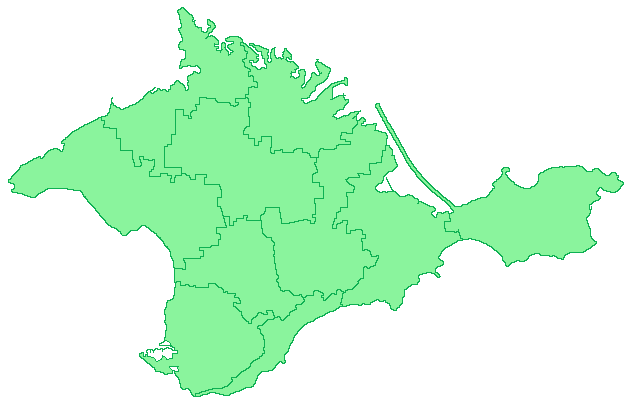

=== Former divisions ===
The Autonomous Republic of Crimea had 25 administrative areas: 14 raions (districts) and 11 mis'kradas and mistos (city municipalities), officially known as territories governed by city councils.

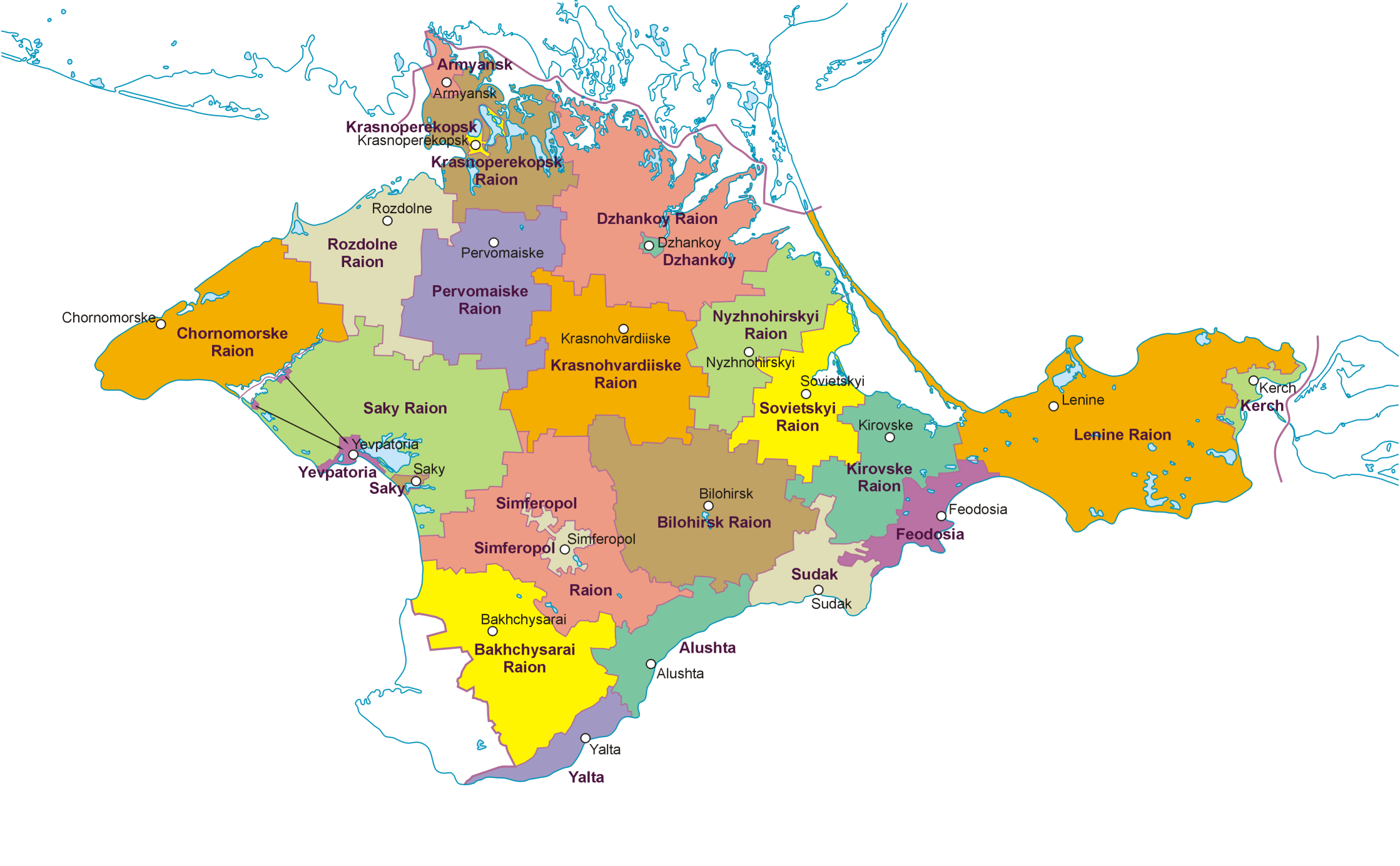
Raions: 1. Bakhchysarai Raion; 2. Bilohirsk Raion; 3. Dzhankoi Raion; 4. Kirovske Raion; 5. Krasnohvardiiske Raion; 6. Krasnoperekopsk Raion; 7. Lenine Raion; 8. Nyzhniohirskyi Raion; 9. Pervomaiske Raion; 10. Rozdolne Raion; 11. Saky Raion; 12. Simferopol Raion; 13. Sovetskyi Raion; 14. Chornomorske Raion	City municipalities: 15. Alushta Municipality; 16. Armyansk Municipality; 17. Dzhankoi Municipality; 18. Yevpatoria Municipality; 19. Kerch Municipality; 20. Krasnoperekopsk Municipality; 21. Saki municipality; 22. Simferopol Municipality; 23. Sudak Municipality; 24. Feodosia Municipality; 25. Yalta Municipality

Major centres of urban development:

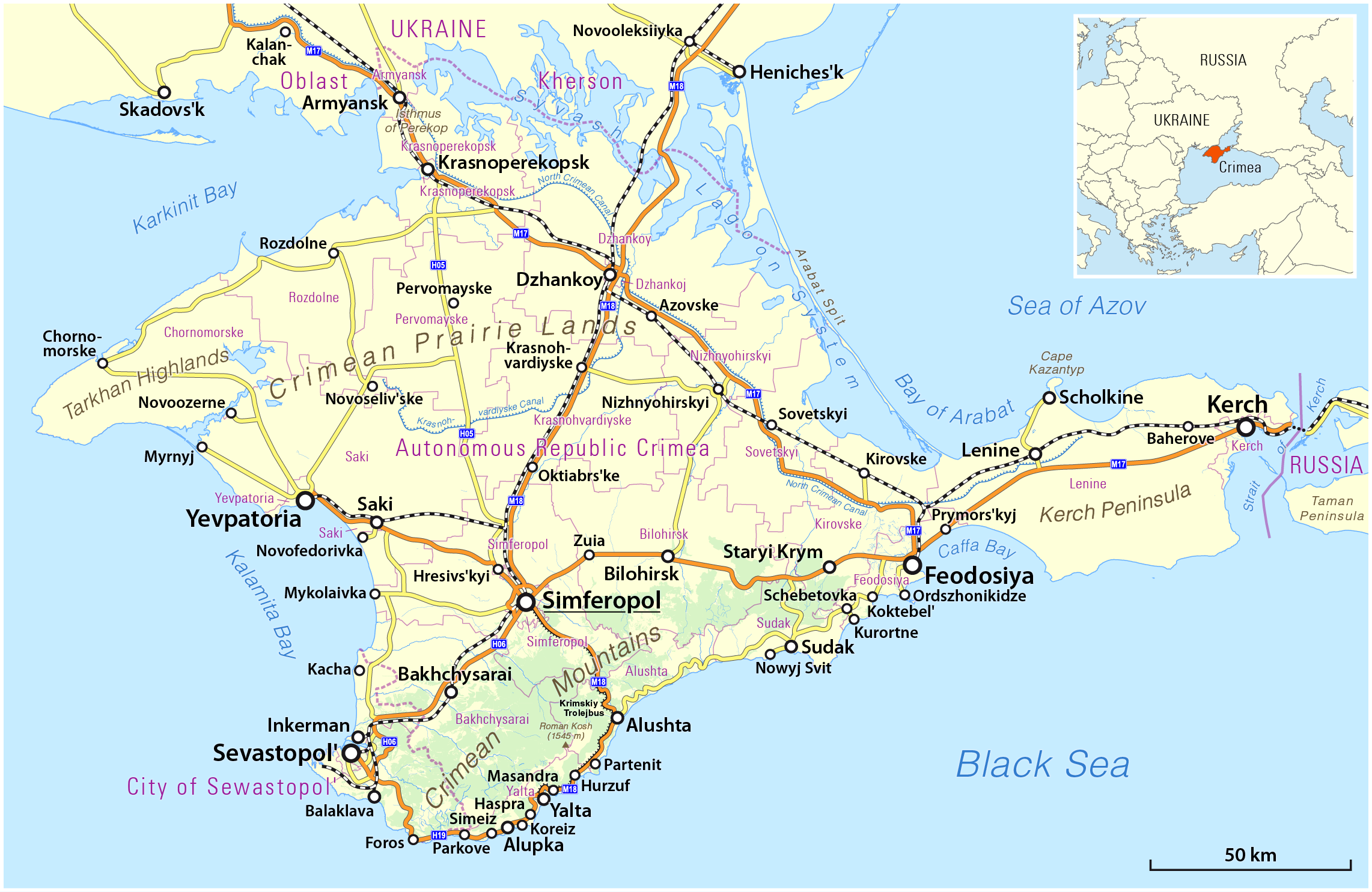
Map of Crimea with major cities

- Simferopol
- Kerch
- Yevpatoria
- Feodosia
- Yalta
- Dzhankoi
- Bakhchysarai
- Krasnoperekopsk
- Armiansk
- Alushta

== See also ==
- Crimean Peninsula
- Political status of Crimea
- Presidential representative of Ukraine in Crimea
