= Anti-NATO (group in the Russian State Duma) =

Anti-NATO is the group of the Russian second State Duma deputies united by a desire to prevent the inclusion of Eastern Europe in NATO. Anti-NATO was formed in the State Duma in 1997 and included 257 members of the State Duma (out of 450) and 47 members of the Federation Council.

== See also ==
- Controversy in Russia regarding the legitimacy of eastward NATO expansion
- 2006 anti-NATO protests in Feodosia
- Withdrawal from NATO
