= 2006 anti-NATO protests in Feodosia =

Protests in Feodosia, Crimea, Ukraine

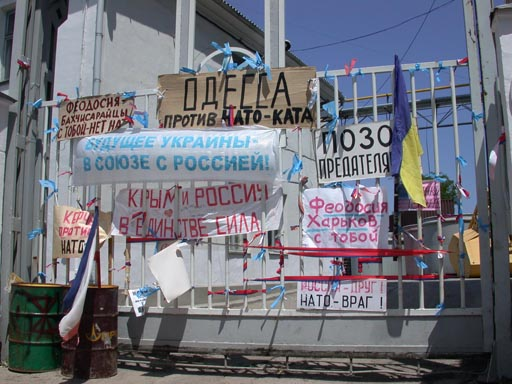
- Anti-NATO posters in Feodosia, 2006
- Date: 29 May – 4 June 2006
- Location: Feodosia, Ukraine
- Goals: Cancellation of joint Ukrainian-U.S. military exercise
- Methods: Protesting; Rioting
- Result: Joint military exercise being cancelled

Parties
Government of Viktor Yushchenko	Anti-NATO protesters

Anti-NATO protests (including one riot) took place in the Ukrainian port city of Feodosia from late May to early June 2006, partially disrupting a joint Ukrainian-U.S. military exercise, which was canceled 20 July 2006.

== Background ==
The military Ukraine-NATO Partnership for Peace military exercise Sea Breeze 2006 (in Crimea) was scheduled to take place in Ukraine starting 17 July 2006. Its aim was to "simulate the defence of a peninsula caught between a totalitarian state and a democratic one." "Sea Breeze" manoeuvres had been held annually since 1997. Another British-Ukrainian war-game called "Tight Knot" was scheduled to start on 14 June 2006 (near Mykolaiv).

=== Legal concerns ===
On 4 June 2006, Ukrainian president Viktor Yushchenko signed a decree on preparations of the two war-games. The approval for the exercises by the Verkhovna Rada (Ukraine's parliament) was still pending early June 2006 because after the parliamentary election of March 2006 it resumed its work on 7 June 2006. In February 2006 the Verkhovna Rada elected before the 2006 election rejected a presidential bill on allowing foreign troops to take part in the maneuvers planned for 2006. The Verkhovna Rada was due to vote on the same bill on 7 June 2006, but decided to adjourn until 14 June.

On 6 June 2006, the Crimean legislature declared Crimea a "NATO-free territory".

== Events ==
On 27 May 2006, the United States (U.S.) cargo ship Advantage anchored in Feodosia, bringing what Ukrainian Defense Minister Anatoliy Hrytsenko described as U.S. "technical aid." Unarmed seamen offloaded construction materials to build barracks for Ukrainian sailors at a training range near the town of Stary Krym, not far from Feodosia. Two days later, Feodosia residents, mobilized by local chapters of the Party of Regions, the Nataliya Vitrenko Bloc, and the Russian Community of Crimea, began to picket the port, displaying anti-NATO slogans written in Russian and blocking U.S. cargo from getting to its destination.

Together with Advantage, 200 U.S. Marine Corps reservists arrived to Feodosia. Their mission was to take part in the Sea Breeze 2006 military exercise from 17 July. When the Marine reservists tried to reach the training facility that they were assigned to renovate protesters surrounded their bus, rocking it and trying to smash the windows, eventually forcing the vehicle to head to a military sanatorium, where the reservists remained. Protesters reportedly harassed Marine reservists if they stepped outside their military base. The marines were advised against going into nearby towns for fear of provoking noisy confrontations. On 4 June 2006 U.S. marines began leaving Crimea. American and Ukrainian officials stated because their contract was ending. Associated Press reported that no repair work was done at the base they were assigned to renovate. On June 8 Ukraine and United Kingdom postponed Tight Knot. On 20 July 2006 the United States cancelled Sea Breeze, "due to the situation in the Middle East".

According to United States sources, the group of protesters rarely consisted of more than a few hundred demonstrators. They accused NATO and the United States of seeking a foothold in Ukraine. The Ukrainian defense ministry stated 2 June 2006 that the planned exercises were not connected with NATO.

== See also ==
- Ukraine–NATO relations
- Anti-NATO (group in the Russian State Duma)
