= Crimean Autonomous Soviet Socialist Republic (1991–1992) =

Ukrainian polity on the Crimean Peninsula

Crimean Autonomous Soviet Socialist Republic: Крымская Автономная Советская Социалистическая Республика (Russian); Къырым Мухтар Социалист Совет Джумхуриети (Crimean Tatar); Кримська Автономна Радянська Соціалістична Республіка (Ukrainian)
- ASSR of the Ukrainian SSR; Autonomous republic of Ukraine
- 1991–1992
- Flag Emblem

- Capital: Simferopol
- Government
  - Type: Autonomous Soviet; Socialist Republic
- History
  - Established: 12 February 1991
  - Declaration of Independence of Ukraine: 24 August 1991
  - Dissolution of the Soviet Union: 26 December 1991
  - Disestablished: 6 May 1992
- Contained within
  - Country: Soviet Union (1991); Ukraine (1991–92)
Preceded by	Succeeded by
Crimean Oblast	Republic of Crimea
- Today part of: Russia (De facto) Ukraine (De jure)

The Crimean Autonomous Soviet Socialist Republic was a polity on the Crimean Peninsula within the Ukrainian Soviet Socialist Republic that was formed during the collapse of the Soviet Union and the following year was renamed the Republic of Crimea. It was later reconstituted as the Autonomous Republic of Crimea.

== History ==
On 12 February 1991, the status of the Crimean Oblast was changed to that of autonomous republic by the Ukrainian SSR as the result of a state-sanctioned referendum held on 20 January 1991. Four months later, on June 19, appropriate changes were made to the Constitution of the Ukrainian SSR.

In September 1991, the Crimean parliament declared the territory to be a sovereign constituent part of Ukraine. Following approval of the Ukrainian independence national referendum on 1 December 1991, the region was part of the newly independent state of Ukraine. With effect from 6 May 1992, the Autonomous Soviet Socialist Republic was transformed into the Republic of Crimea within Ukraine.

The status of Sevastopol, due to its strategic importance as the main base of the Russian Black Sea Fleet, remained disputed between Ukraine and Russia until 1997 when it was agreed that it should be treated as a "city with special status" within Ukraine.

Since 2014, the Crimean Peninsula has been under Russian control following the annexation of Crimea by the Russian Federation.

== Leadership ==
Chairman of the Supreme Council

- 22 March 1991 – 9 May 1994 Mykola Bahrov

Chairman of the Council of Ministers

- 22 March 1991 – 20 May 1993 Vitaliy Kurashik

== See also ==
- Crimea in the Soviet Union
