= United Nations General Assembly Resolution 73/194 =

2018 UN resolution regarding Russian activities in Crimea

UN General Assembly Resolution 73/194
In favour
Against
Abstained
Absent
Non-UN member
- Date: 17 December 2018
- Meeting no.: 56th Plenary
- Code: A/RES/73/194 (Document)
- Subject: Problem of the militarization of the Autonomous Republic of Crimea and the city of Sevastopol, Ukraine, as well as parts of the Black Sea and the Sea of Azov
- Voting summary: 66 voted for; 19 voted against; 72 abstained; 36 absent
- Result: Resolution adopted

The United Nations General Assembly Resolution 73/194 was adopted on December 17, 2018 by the Seventy-third session of the United Nations General Assembly in response to the Russian activities in Crimea as well as the Kerch Strait incident. The non-binding resolution, which was supported by 66 United Nations member states, affirmed the General Assembly's commitment to the territorial integrity of Ukraine within its internationally recognized borders and condemns the Kerch Strait incident. Nineteen nations voted against the resolution, while 72 abstained, and a further 36 states were absent when the vote took place.

== Voting ==
In favour (64)	Abstaining (83)	Against (15)	Absent (31)
Albania; Andorra; Antigua and Barbuda; Australia; Austria; Belgium; Belize; Botswana; Bulgaria; Canada; Costa Rica; Croatia; Cyprus; Czech Republic; Denmark; Djibouti; Estonia; Finland; France; Georgia; Germany; Guatemala; Greece; Guyana; Hungary; Iceland; Ireland; Israel; Italy; Japan; Kiribati; Latvia; Liberia; Liechtenstein; Lithuania; Luxembourg; Macedonia; Maldives; Malta; Marshall Islands; Micronesia; Monaco; Moldova; Montenegro; Netherlands; New Zealand; Norway; Poland; Portugal; Romania; Samoa; San Marino; Singapore; Slovakia; Slovenia; Solomon Islands; Spain; Sweden; Switzerland; Turkey; Tuvalu; Ukraine; United Kingdom; United States; Vanuatu	Algeria; Angola; Argentina; Bahrain; Bangladesh; Barbados; Benin; Bhutan; Brazil; Brunei; Burkina Faso; Cameroon; Chile; China; Colombia; Comoros; Dominican Republic; Ecuador; Egypt; El Salvador; Equatorial Guinea; Eritrea; Ethiopia; Fiji; Guinea; Honduras; India; Indonesia; Iraq; Ivory Coast; Jamaica; Jordan; Kazakhstan; Kenya; Kuwait; Kyrgyzstan; Malawi; Malaysia; Mali; Mexico; Mongolia; Mozambique; Namibia; Nauru; Nepal; Nigeria; Oman; Pakistan; Paraguay; Palau; Peru; Philippines; Qatar; Rwanda; Saint Lucia; Saint Vincent and the Grenadines; Senegal; Seychelles; South Africa; South Korea; Sri Lanka; Thailand; Togo; Trinidad and Tobago; United Arab Emirates; Uruguay; Vietnam; Yemen	Armenia; Belarus; Bolivia; Burundi; Cambodia; Cuba; Iran; Laos; Myanmar; Nicaragua; North Korea; Russia; Serbia; South Sudan; Sudan; Syria; Uzbekistan; Venezuela; Zimbabwe	Afghanistan; Azerbaijan; Bahamas; Bosnia and Herzegovina; Burkina Faso; Cabo Verde; Central African Republic; Chad; Democratic Republic of the Congo; Dominica; Gabon; Gambia; Ghana; Grenada; Guinea-Bissau; Haiti; Lebanon; Lesotho; Libya; Madagascar; Mauritania; Mauritius; Morocco; Niger; Republic of the Congo; Saint Kitts and Nevis; Sao Tome and Principe; Sierra Leone; Somalia; Suriname; Tajikistan; Timor-Leste; Tonga; Tunisia; Turkmenistan; Zambia
Observer States: Holy See and State of Palestine

== Draft Amendment ==
Before action on the initial draft, the Islamic Republic of Iran and the Syrian Arab Republic proposed an amendment calling upon both parties to cooperate on resolving the crisis. The Amendment failed with only 25 votes in favor.

In favour (64)	Abstaining (83)	Against (15)	Absent (31)
Belarus; Bolivia; Burundi; Cambodia; China; Cuba; Eritrea; Indonesia; Iran; Kazakhstan; Laos; Myanmar; Nauru; Nicaragua; Nigeria; North Korea; Russia; Singapore; Serbia; South Sudan; Sudan; Suriname; Syria; Venezuela; Zimbabwe	Algeria; Angola; Argentina; Bahrain; Bangladesh; Barbados; Benin; Bhutan; Brazil; Brunei; Burkina Faso; Cameroon; Chile; Colombia; Dominican Republic; Ecuador; Egypt; El Salvador; Equatorial Guinea; Ethiopia; Guinea; India; Ivory Coast; Jamaica; Jordan; Kenya; Kuwait; Kyrgyzstan; Liberia; Malawi; Malaysia; Mali; Mexico; Mongolia; Mozambique; Namibia; Nepal; Oman; Pakistan; Paraguay; Palau; Peru; Philippines; Qatar; Rwanda; Saint Lucia; Saint Vincent and the Grenadines; Samoa; Senegal; Seychelles; South Africa; Sri Lanka; Thailand; Togo; Trinidad and Tobago; United Arab Emirates; Uruguay; Yemen	Albania; Andorra; Australia; Austria; Belgium; Belize; Botswana; Bulgaria; Canada; Costa Rica; Croatia; Cyprus; Czech Republic; Denmark; Djibouti; Estonia; Finland; France; Georgia; Germany; Guatemala; Greece; Guyana; Honduras; Hungary; Iceland; Ireland; Israel; Italy; Japan; Kiribati; Latvia; Liechtenstein; Lithuania; Luxembourg; Macedonia; Maldives; Malta; Marshall Islands; Micronesia; Monaco; Moldova; Montenegro; Netherlands; New Zealand; Norway; Poland; Portugal; Romania; Samoa; San Marino; Slovakia; Slovenia; Solomon Islands; South Korea; Spain; Sweden; Switzerland; Turkey; Tuvalu; Ukraine; United Kingdom; United States; Vanuatu	Afghanistan; Antigua and Barbuda; Armenia; Azerbaijan; Bahamas; Bosnia and Herzegovina; Burkina Faso; Cabo Verde; Comoros; Central African Republic; Chad; Democratic Republic of the Congo; Dominica; Fiji; Gabon; Gambia; Ghana; Grenada; Guinea-Bissau; Haiti; Iraq; Lebanon; Lesotho; Libya; Madagascar; Mauritania; Mauritius; Morocco; Niger; Republic of the Congo; Saint Kitts and Nevis; Sao Tome and Principe; Sierra Leone; Somalia; Tajikistan; Timor-Leste; Tonga; Tunisia; Turkmenistan; Uzbekistan; Vietnam; Zambia
Observer States: Holy See and State of Palestine
