= Republican Party of Crimea =

Republican Party of Crimea Республіканська партія Криму
- Russian name: Республиканская партия Крыма
- Leader: Yuriy Meshkov
- Founded: October 24, 1992 (33 years ago)
- Dissolved: April 22, 1995
- Merged into: Civil Congress of Ukraine
- Ideology: Russian nationalism

Republican Party of Crimea (Ukrainian: Республіканська партія Криму, Respublikanska partiya Krymu; Russian: Республиканская партия Крыма, Respublikanskaya partiya Kryma) was a regional separatist political party of Ukraine, that was created in 1992 based on the Republican Movement of Crimea and fought for the incorporation of Crimea into the Russian Federation.

== Historical background ==
The Republican Movement of Crimea (RDK) was founded in 1991 in the aftermath of the Ukrainian Declaration of Independence. Its goal was to revive the republican status of the region and its sovereignty.

It has been alleged that the movement was financed by the local company "Impeks-55" and supported by a criminal gang "Bashmaki" (after its leader Bashmakov). With the help of the Black Sea Fleet administration, in February 1992 the movement initiated gathering of signatures for a referendum for Crimea in the new Soviet Union.
