= 1994 Crimean presidential election =

- January 16, 1994 (first round); January 30, 1994 (second round)
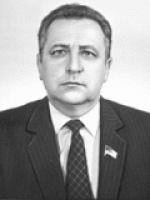
Nominee	Yuriy Meshkov	Mykola Bahrov
Party	Russia Bloc	Independent
Popular vote	1,040,888	333,243
Percentage	73.18%	23.43%
President before election
None; office created
October 13, 1993
Elected President
Yuriy Meshkov

The only presidential elections were contested in the Republic of Crimea for the post of President of Crimea, at the time a republic within Ukraine. The office was created by the Verkhovna Rada of Crimea, the republic's unicameral parliament October 13, 1993. Elections were subsequently held on January 16, 1994 with the second round on January 30 since a two-round system was used to elect the President. The presidential elections in Crimea were one of the most important precedents of the Crimean crisis that laid the basis for the Ukrainian-Russian international relationship.

== Overview ==
The pro-Russian Yuriy Meshkov won the second round of voting with 72.9 percent of the vote. Some of the other candidates that showed interest, but not listed in the table below were Yevhen Isaev (Green Party of Crimea) and Natalia Vasilyeva (Sevastopol City Council deputy). The Crimean parliament refused to register the People's Movement of Ukraine's representative on November 18, 1993.

== Background ==
Meshkov was able to remain in office until March 17, 1995 when the Verkhovna Rada of Ukraine abolished the office of president. Two weeks thereafter the President of Ukraine temporarily re-subordinated the government of Crimea to the Cabinet of Ministers of Ukraine with reservation to appoint the Crimean prime-minister by the President of Ukraine. In light of that the parliament of Crimea appealed to both parliaments of Russia and Ukraine not to hurry in signing the friendship treaty without ignoring the interest of people of the peninsula.

At first the Russian government stated that the Crimean problem is the Ukrainian internal issues, implying that there are no intentions of the Russian government to intervene. Even the First Deputy Prime Minister Oleg Soskovets who arrived to Kyiv to sign an international agreement between Russia and Ukraine soon after the disestablishment of the presidential post in Crimea confirmed that it will not influence the ongoing negotiations between the two neighboring countries. State Duma, nevertheless, later issued its note of concern for the negotiations with Kyiv which may jeopardize the stability in the region. Soon thereafter the President of the Russian Federation announced that the friendship treaty could not be signed, while the current Russian foreign minister Andrei Kozyrev in the context of the situation in Crimea chose the following words:

...the use of direct military force might be necessary to protect our compatriots abroad.

The Crimean question first surfaced in January 1992 when on the initiative of Vladimir Lukin the Russian parliamentarians were given a draft of resolution concerning the 1954 transfer of Crimea. The resolution was composed by the Committee of Foreign Affairs and Foreign Economic Relations which he headed at that time and proposed to annul the decision of the Supreme Soviet of the USSR. The proposal was not addressed at that time to avoid any additional open confrontations (Civil war in Tajikistan, First Nagorno-Karabakh War, Georgian Civil War, and others). When the issue of Crimea was raised again in 1994 together with the Black Sea Fleet, Lukin stated that his main intentions were to put the government of Ukraine in front of the dilemma either to surrender the Ukrainian ports and the Fleet or deal with questioning status of the Crimea, the invalidation of which he had intentions to pass in the Russian Parliament with the before mentioned resolution.

== Results ==
Candidate	Party	First round		Second round	
Candidate	Party	Votes	%	Votes	%
Yuriy Meshkov	Russia Bloc	557,220	43.26	1,040,888	73.18
Mykola Bahrov	Independent	254,041	19.72	333,243	23.43
Serhiy Shuvainykov	Russian Party of Crimea	196,346	15.24		
Leonid Hrach	Communist Party of Ukraine	176,318	13.69		
Ivan Yermakov	Independent	90,077	6.99		
Volodymyr Verkoshansky	Independent	14,205	1.10		
Against all				48,154	3.39
Total		1,288,207	100.00	1,422,285	100.00
Valid votes				1,422,285	99.64
Invalid/blank votes				5,134	0.36
Total votes				1,427,419	100.00
Registered voters/turnout				1,900,035	75.13
Source: Politika-Crimea
