= Republic of Crimea (1992–1995) =

Autonomous region of Ukraine

Coordinates: 44°57′7.62″N 34°6′8.64″E

The Republic of Crimea was the interim name of a polity on the Crimean peninsula from the dissolution of the Crimean Autonomous Soviet Socialist Republic in 1992 to the abolition of the Crimean Constitution by the Ukrainian Parliament in 1995. This period was one of conflict with the Ukrainian government over the levels of autonomy that Crimea enjoyed in relation to Ukraine, and links between Crimea and the Russian Federation.

== History ==
=== Crimean ASSR ===
Following Soviet victory in the Civil War and establishment of the new Soviet administrative units, Crimea was granted Autonomous Soviet Socialist Republic status in 1921 as part of the Soviet korenizatsiia policy for Crimean Tatars. It was meant to grant a degree of autonomy for national minorities within much larger Soviet republics. After World War II the Soviet government accused Crimean Tatars of alleged crimes during the war and had them deported in 1945. Without a national minority (of Tatars), Crimea was stripped of its autonomous republic status and became the Crimean oblast of the Russian SFSR.

In February 1954 the Crimean oblast was transferred to the Ukrainian Soviet Socialist Republic. As part of Ukraine it retained its oblast status until January 1991, when the Crimean sovereignty referendum was held to increase Crimean autonomy within Ukraine by re-establishing the Crimean ASSR and approved by 94% of voters on a turnout above 80%. In September 1991 the Crimean Parliament declared the territory to be a sovereign constituent part of Ukraine.

In August 1991, Yuriy Meshkov established the Republican Movement of Crimea, which was registered on 19 November, to revive the republican status of the region and its sovereignty. With the help of the Black Sea Fleet administration, in February 1992 the movement initiated the gathering of signatures for a referendum for Crimea in the new Soviet Union.

=== Name change in 1992 ===
On 26 February 1992, the Crimean parliament changed the official name from "Crimean ASSR" to "Republic of Crimea". Then on 5 May, it proclaimed self-government and twice enacted a constitution that the Ukrainian Parliament and government deemed to be inconsistent with Ukraine's constitution. In June 1992, the parties reached a compromise, that Crimea would have considerable autonomy but remain part of Ukraine.

=== Name change in 1995 ===
On 30 January 1994, Yuriy Meshkov was elected as President of Crimea on a pro-Russian platform against the favoured candidate of the local establishment, Nikolai Bagrov. Despite then winning a referendum on further autonomy, Meshkov quickly ran into conflicts with parliament. On 8 September, the Crimean parliament degraded the President's powers from the head of state to the head of the executive power only, to which Meshkov responded by disbanding parliament and announcing his control over Crimea four days later.

Ukraine decided to intervene. On 21 September 1994 the Ukrainian Parliament renamed the Crimean Autonomous Soviet Socialistic Republic as the Autonomous Republic of Crimea, and a week later the new Ukrainian President named Anatoliy Franchuk as the Prime Minister of Crimea. On 17 March 1995, the Ukrainian parliament abolished the Crimean Constitution of 1992, all the laws and decrees contradicting those enacted by Kyiv, removed Meshkov as President of Crimea and abolished the office itself. After this Ukrainian National Guard troops entered Meshkov's residence, disarmed his bodyguards and put him on a plane to Moscow.

On 31 March Ukrainian President Leonid Kuchma issued a decree that subordinated the Crimean government to the Ukrainian Cabinet and that gave the Ukrainian President the power to appoint the Prime Minister of Crimea. Crimea's status of being subordinate to Kyiv was confirmed eventually by the remaining Crimean authorities.

From June until September 1995, Kuchma governed Crimea under a direct presidential administration decree. Crimea (with the exception of the city of Sevastopol) was designated an Autonomous Republic in the Ukrainian Constitution of 1996. After an interim constitution, the 1998 Constitution of the Autonomous Republic of Crimea was ratified, changing the territory's name to the Autonomous Republic of Crimea.

== Politics ==
=== Relations with Ukraine ===
At first Crimean authorities attempted to claim that it was a sovereign republic, albeit with a relationship with Ukraine. On 5 May 1992, the Crimean legislature declared conditional independence, but a referendum to confirm the decision was never held, amid opposition from Kyiv.

On 17 December 1992, the office of the Ukrainian presidential representative in Crimea was created. This led to a wave of protests. Among the protesters that created the unsanctioned rally were the Sevastopol branches of the National Salvation Front, the Russian Popular Assembly, and the All-Crimean Movement of the Voters for the Republic of Crimea.

In February 1994 the Ukrainian Parliament issued an ultimatum to Crimea, which had just elected the pro-Russian Meshkov, giving it a month to harmonise its laws with Ukraine. Meshkov, however, tried to institute a number of symbolic measures, such as harmonising the time with Russia rather than Ukraine.

=== Relations with Russia ===
Russian politicians had from the time of Ukraine's independence questioned the 1954 transfer of Crimea, including prominent politicians such as mayor of Moscow Yury Luzhkov and Vladimir Zhirinovsky. In October 1991 Russian Vice President Alexander Rutskoi, on a visit to Kyiv, claimed Russian control and ownership of the Black Sea fleet, based in Sevastopol, and, indirectly, Russian sovereignty over the whole Crimean Peninsula. In April 1992 a similar resolution claiming Crimea was passed by the Russian Federation parliament. The Crimean Parliament's choice of flag in September 1992 was seen as mimicking the Russian tricolor.

The status of Sevastopol, due to its strategic importance as the main base of the Russian Black Sea Fleet, remained disputed between Ukraine and Russia, with the rogue Russian Parliament staking a claim for Sevastopol in 1993. On 11 December 1992, the President of Ukraine called the attempt of "the Russian deputies to charge the Russian parliament with a task to define the status of Sevastopol as an 'imperial disease'".

In April 1993, during the 1993 Russian constitutional crisis, the Russian Parliament proposed to support a referendum on Crimean independence and include the republic as a separate entity in the Commonwealth of Independent States, an offer that was later withdrawn. After Boris Yeltsin won his struggle with the Russian Parliament the Russian stance towards Ukraine changed. Yeltsin refused to meet with the Crimean President, and Russian Prime Minister Viktor Chernomyrdin stated that Russia had no claim on Crimea.

In 1994, the legal status of Crimea as part of Ukraine was backed up by Russia, who pledged to uphold the territorial integrity of Ukraine in a memorandum signed in 1994, also signed by the US and UK.

== See also ==
- History of Crimea

== Sources ==
- Belitser, Natalya (20 February 2000). "The Constitutional Process in the Autonomous Republic of Crimea in the Context of Interethnic Relations and Conflict Settlement". International Committee for Crimea.
- Bohlen, Celestine (23 March 1994). "Russia vs. Ukraine: A Case of the Crimean Jitters". New York Times.
- Chazan, Guy (9 July 1993). "Russian lawmakers claim sovereignty over Ukrainian port". UPI.
- Dawson, Jane (December 1997). "Ethnicity, Ideology and Geopolitics in Crimea". Communist and Post-Communist Studies. 30 (4): 427–444. doi:10.1016/S0967-067X(97)00013-5. JSTOR 45302046.
- Drohobycky, Maria (1993). Crimea: Dynamics, Challenges and Prospects. American Association for the Advancement of Science. ISBN 9780847680672.
- Kolstø, Pål; Edemsky, Adam (1995). Russians in the Former Soviet Republics. Indiana University Press. ISBN 0253329175.
- Eastern Europe, Russia and Central Asia 2004. Routledge. 27 November 2003. ISBN 1857431871.
- Kozyrev, Andrei (Fall 2016). "Boris Yeltsin, the Soviet Union, the CIS, and Me". The Wilson Quarterly/Wilson Center.
- Kramer, Mark (19 March 2014). "Why Did Russia Give Away Crimea Sixty Years Ago? CWIHP e-Dossier No. 47". Wilson Center, History and Public Policy Program, Cold War International History Project.
- Mizrokhi, Elena (August 2009). "Russian 'separatism' in Crimea and NATO: Ukraine's big hope, Russia's grand gamble" (PDF). Laval University.
- Moshes, Arkady; Nizhnikau, Ryhor (2018). Russian-Ukrainian Relations: The Farewell That Wasn't. Finnish Institute of International Affairs. ISBN 9789517695602.
- Schmemann, Serge (6 May 1992). "Crimea Parliament Votes to Back Independence From Ukraine". New York Times.
- Subtelny, Orest (2009). Ukraine: A History Fourth Edition. University of Toronto Press. ISBN 978-0-8020-8390-6.
- Umerov, Eldar (December 2012). "The Crimean Autonomous Region and Ukraine's Relations with Russia in the Post-Soviet Era" (PDF). Middle East Technical University.
- Wolczuk, Kataryna (31 August 2004). "Catching up with 'Europe'? Constitutional Debates on the Territorial-Administrative Model in Independent Ukraine". Region, State and Identity in Central and Eastern Europe. pp. 74–97. doi:10.4324/9780203045770-11 (inactive 12 July 2025). ISBN 9780203045770.
- Wydra, Doris (2003). "The Crimea Conundrum: The Tug of War Between Russia and Ukraine on the Questions of Autonomy and Self-Determination". International Journal on Minority and Group Rights. 10 (2): 111–130. doi:10.1163/157181104322784826. JSTOR 24675066.
- Zaborsky, Victor (September 1995). "Crimea and the Black Sea Fleet in Russian-Ukrainian Relations, CSIA Discussion Paper 95-11" (PDF). Kennedy School of Government, Harvard University.
- "Why Crimea is so dangerous". BBC News. 11 March 2014.
- Council of Europe Parliamentary Assembly Documents 1999: Ordinary Session (First part, January 1999). Vol. I. Council of Europe Publishing. 16 December 1999. ISBN 978-92-871-3957-3.
- "Crimea 94. Part 2 "Black Sea Fleet on the scales of political bargaining"". Borysfen Intel. 18 February 2013. Archived from the original on 21 November 2016.
- ""Crimea should be Ukrainian, but without bloodshed." How Ukraine saved the peninsula 25 years ago". LB.ua (in Ukrainian). 16 July 2020.
- "Ukraine Moves To Oust Leader Of Separatists". New York Times. 19 March 1995.
- "Canada: Immigration and Refugee Board of Canada, Chronology of Events: March 1994 - August 1995". Refworld. United Nations Refugee Agency (UNRA). 1 November 1995.
- "Minorities at Risk Project, Chronology for Crimean Russians in Ukraine, 2004". Refworld. United Nations Refugee Agency (UNRA). 2004.
