= Yuriy Meshkov =

Ukrainian politician (1945–2019)

President of Crimea
- In office 16 February 1994 – 17 March 1995
- Preceded by: Position established
- Succeeded by: Position abolished

3rd Prime Minister of Crimea
- In office 4 February 1994 – 6 October 1994
- Preceded by: Borys Samsonov
- Succeeded by: Anatoliy Franchuk

Personal details
- Born: 25 October 1945 Synelnykove, Ukrainian SSR, Soviet Union (now Ukraine)
- Died: 29 September 2019 (aged 73) Krasnogorsk, Moscow Oblast, Russia
- Party: Republican Party of Crimea
- Other political affiliations: Bloc "Russia"
- Education: Moscow State University (1977)
- Occupation: Lawyer

Yuri Aleksandrovich Meshkov (Ukrainian: Юрій Олександрович Мєшков, Yuriy Oleksandrovych Meshkov, Russian: Юрий Александрович Мешков; 25 October 1945 – 29 September 2019) was a Ukrainian politician and leader of the pro-Russian movement in Crimea. He served as the only President of Crimea from 1994 to 1995.

However, eleven days after his return to Crimea in 2011, which was his first visit since 1995, Meshkov was deported from Ukraine on 13 July 2011, with a five-year restriction on his entry.

== Biography ==
Yuri Meshkov was born on 25 October 1945 in Synelnykove, Dnipropetrovsk Oblast, Ukrainian Soviet Socialist Republic (now Ukraine). His mother was Ukrainian-born, and his father was a native Kuban Cossack Russian. He grew up in Simferopol, where he completed his high school education. When he was about eight years old, Crimea was officially transferred from the Russian SFSR to the Ukrainian SSR.

According to an opinion column in the New York Times Meshkov served in the Border Guard division of the KGB. In 1967 (or 1977, as some sources indicate), he graduated from the Law School of Moscow State University. From 1982 to 1985, he worked as a detective and later became the head detective in the District Attorney's office. Between 1985 and 1990, he spent time on the science-research yacht Skif. During this period, he also worked as a private judicial consultant. Meshkov was actively involved in various leadership roles, such as being one of the leaders of the Crimea department of the All-Union historical-enlightening society "Memorial" and serving as the president of the Crimean Federation of kickboxing.

In 1990, Meshkov was elected as a deputy to the Supreme Council of Crimea, the parliament of the Republic of Crimea. He played a role in co-founding the RDK Party (Republican movement of Crimea). In 1994, Meshkov led the electoral bloc "Russia" during the republican presidential elections. In the second round of elections, he comfortably defeated Mykola Bahrov, who ran as an independent candidate. At the time, Bahrov served as the head of the Supreme Council of Crimea.

During the second round of the 1994 Crimean presidential elections, Meshkov secured a victory with 72.9 percent of the votes and became the sole president of the republic.

Yuri Meshkov's primary political agenda was to establish much closer ties with the Russian Federation, potentially leading to the reunification of Crimea with Russia. Meshkov attempted to initiate a number of measures to prepare Crimea for future integration with Russia; though he was able to align Crimea's time zone with that of Russia he was unable to fully implement his platform nor obtain the support of Russian president Boris Yeltsin for Crimean accession to the Russian Federation.

In response to his efforts, in 1995 the Ukrainian parliament scrapped the Crimean Constitution, abolished the post of president on March 17 and moved to depose and exile Meshkov from the country. Ukrainian special forces entered Meshkov's residence, disarmed his bodyguards and put him on a plane to Moscow.

Living in exile in Moscow, he taught at the Moscow University. He did not return to Crimea till 2 July 2011 because his ex-wife (Lyudmyla) had died (on 28 May 2011). At a 7 July 2011 press conference, he called for a referendum on restoring the 1992 Crimean constitution, which actually declared Crimea a sovereign state. Meshkov also stated then that he ruled out the possibility of his participation in the political life of Crimea because of the need to change citizenship; but instead would participate in "the work of social organizations". He also stated "the Russian movement in Crimea is divided and overrun by random people and traitors". The District Administrative Court of Crimea controlled by Ukraine at that time deported Meshkov from Ukraine with the restriction of entry for 5 years on 13 July 2011.

After the 2014 annexation of Crimea by Russia, Meshkov returned to the peninsula.
