= President of Crimea =

Ukrainian political position (1994–95)

President of Autonomous Republic of Crimea Президент Республіки Крим
- Coat of arms of Crimea
- Appointer: Direct popular vote
- Formation: 16 February 1994
- First holder: Yuriy Meshkov
- Final holder: Yuriy Meshkov
- Abolished: 17 March 1995
- Succession: Vice-Prime Minister of Crimea

The President of the Republic of Crimea (Ukrainian: Президент Республіки Крим; Russian: Президент Республики Крым, Crimean Tatar: Qırım Cumhuriyetiniñ Prezidenti, Къырым Джумхурийетининъ Президенти) was the head of the then-styled Republic of Crimea, Ukraine from 16 February 1994, to the time of the liquidation of this position on 17 March 1995. The post was liquidated as it contradicted the Constitution of Ukraine.

The first round of voting in the Crimean presidential elections was held on 16 January 1994, and on 30 January, the second round was held. With 72.9% of the vote, the pro-Russian politician Yuriy Meshkov was declared the winner. He was the only person to hold the post of President of the Republic of Crimea.
