= List of chairmen of the Executive Committee of Crimea =

This is a list of chairmen of the Central Executive Committee, chairmen of the Presidium of the Supreme Soviet, and chairmen of the Executive Committee of the Crimean ASSR (1921–1945) and the Crimean Oblast (1945–1991) in the Russian SFSR (from February 19, 1954 in the Ukrainian SSR) of the Soviet Union. The position was created on November 7, 1921, and abolished on March 22, 1991.

Soon after the evacuation of the White Volunteer Army, during 1920–1921 Crimea was governed at first by the Soviet Commander of the 4th Army (Vladimir Lazarevich and then the Crimea revkom (Bela Kun and Mikhail Polyakov).

In 1991 the post was replaced with Prime Minister of Crimea.

== List of chairmen ==
Name	Term of office		Life years
Name	Start	End	Life years
Chairmen of the Central Executive Committee
Yuri Gaven (Dauman)	November 7, 1921	August 1924	1884–1936
Veli İbraimov	August 1924	January 28, 1928	1889–1928
Memet Qubayev	January 28, 1928	February 20, 1931	
İlyas Tarhan	February 20, 1931	September 9, 1937	1900–1938
Abdul Menbariev	September 9, 1937	July 21, 1938	
Chairmen of the Presidium of the Supreme Soviet
Abdul Menbariev (Note: In Russian SFSR exile from 1942)	July 21, 1938	May 18, 1944	
N. I. Sacheva (Note: Acting)	May 18, 1944	June 30, 1945	
Chairmen of the Executive Committee
Aleksandr Kabanov	June 30, 1945	April 1946	1899–1975
Dmitriy Kryvoshein	April 1946	June 10, 1949	1905–1979
Vasiliy Nikanorov	June 10, 1949	December 12, 1949	1904–1982
Sergey Postovalov	December 12, 1949	September 23, 1952	1907–1983
Dmitry Polyansky	September 23, 1952	February 16, 1954	1917–2001
Mykhailo Kuzmenko	February 16, 1954	June 1956	
Ivan Filippov	June 1956	October 9, 1959	1905–1963
Vladimir Druzhynin (Note: For Agriculture January 1963 – December 1964)	October 9, 1959	December 7, 1965	1907–1976
Mykola Moiseyev (Note: For Industry)	January 12, 1963	December 7, 1964	1918–1970
Trofim Tchemodurov	January 18, 1966	December 21, 1979	1917–200.
Yuriy Bachtin	September 21, 1979	April 13, 1985	1929–2010
Aleksandr Roschupkin	April 13, 1985	December 27, 1989	1929–2006
Vitaliy Kurashik	December 27, 1989	March 22, 1991	1939–

== See also ==
- Crimean ASSR
- Crimean Oblast
- Crimea Regional Committee of the Communist Party of Ukraine
- Prime Minister of Crimea and Presidential representative of Ukraine in Crimea

== Sources ==
- World Statesmen.org
