= Mustafa Chachi =

Soviet collective farm manager (1935–1970)

- Born: 25 May 1935; Körbekül, Crimean ASSR, Russian SFSR, Soviet Union (now Izobilne, Crimea)
- Died: 15 February 1970 (aged 34); Tashkent, Uzbek SSR, Soviet Union (now Uzbekistan)
- Occupation: Director of the 5th division of the “Five-Year Plan of the Uzbek SSR” sovkhoz
- Years active: 1949–1970
- Known for: Innovator of organizing productive labor and implementing new methods
- Awards: Hero of Socialist Labor

Mustafa Seydulayevich Chachi (Russian: Мустафа Сейдулаевич Чачи; 25 May 1935 – 15 February 1970) was the director of the 5th division of the "Five-Year Plan of the Uzbek SSR" sovkhoz in Oqqoʻrgʻon District of Tashkent region, Uzbek SSR, and an innovator of organizing productive labor and implementing new methods. He was awarded the title of Hero of Socialist Labor in 1966 and was one of the signatories of the notorious letter of seventeen telling other Crimean Tatars to give up dreams of returning to Crimea.

== Biography ==
He was born on 25 May 1935 in the village of Körbekül (renamed Izobilne in 1945) in the Crimean ASSR to a Crimean Tatar family. In 1944, he was deported from Crimea to the Uzbek Soviet Socialist Republic in 1944 as part of a campaign of ethnic cleansing. Upon arriving in Tashkent Region, only Mustafa was able to work (his parents were elderly, his elder sister was disabled, his brother and sister were still young), so he started working at the age of 14. He was a worker at the “Five-Year Plan of the Uzbek SSR” sovkhoz in Okkurgan district of Tashkent region. Later, he worked as a tractor driver. From 1957 to 1958, he was an assistant mechanic, and from 1958 to 1960, he was the leader of the mechanized field-breeding brigade of the sovkhoz.

He constantly sought and applied new ways of improving labor productivity. He transferred his brigade to self-financing. He was the first to establish a mixed mechanized tractor-field-breeding brigade in the sovkhoz. Such brigades were more efficient than separate tractor and field brigades.

By the decree of the Presidium of the Supreme Soviet of the USSR on 30 April 1966, Mustafa Chachi was awarded the Order of Lenin and the “Hammer and Sickle” gold medal and the title of Hero of Socialist Labor for his achievements in increasing cotton production and silkworm breeding.

Mustafo Chachi's experience of efficient labor was studied by visitors from all over the Soviet Union, as well as from foreign countries.

He was a deputy of the 7th convocation of the Supreme Soviet of the USSR (1966–1970).

At the end of the 1960s, when the Crimean Tatars were allowed to move more freely throughout the country, he signed the notorious and widely criticized letter of seventeen in March 1968 that encouraged other Crimean Tatars from giving up their dreams of returning to Crimea and avoid succumbing to "provocations" encouraging them to return, and claimed that the real tragedy would be leaving the Uzbek SSR.

He died of a short illness on 15 February 1970. He was buried at the Chigatoy memorial cemetery in Tashkent.

== Awards ==
- Hero of Socialist Labor (30 April 1966)
- Order of Lenin (30 April 1966)
- Order of the Red Banner of Labour (16 February 1963)

== Memory ==
In Uzbekistan, a street, a village, a children's camp, a sanatorium are named after him, a diploma named after Mustafa Chachi has been established. A statue of him has been erected at his burial place.
