= List of chairmen of the Supreme Council of Crimea =

Chairman of the Supreme Council of Crimea Голова Верховної Ради Криму
- Coat of arms of Crimea
- Incumbent; Post liquidated since March 15, 2014
- Inaugural holder: Mykola Bahrov
- Formation: March 22, 1991
- Succession: First Deputy Chairman
- Website: http://www.rada.crimea.ua/

This is a list of chairmen of the Supreme Council of Crimea:

Name	Period	Party
Mykola Bahrov	March 22, 1991 – May 10, 1994	KPU/PEV
Sergei Tsekov	May 10, 1994 – July 6, 1995	RPK
Yevheniy Suprunyuk	July 6, 1995 – October 10, 1996	RB
Vasyl Kislov	October 10, 1996 – February 13, 1997	
Anatoliy Hrytsenko	February 13, 1997 – May 14, 1998	PEV
Leonid Hrach	May 14, 1998 – April 29, 2002	KPU
Boris Deich	April 29, 2002 – May 12, 2006	PR
Anatoliy Hrytsenko	May 12, 2006 – March 17, 2010	PR
Vladimir Konstantinov	March 17, 2010 – March 15/17, 2014 (Note: The Supreme Council was declared dissolved by the Ukrainian Parliament on 15 March 2014, but de facto it continued to work and on 17 March, after controversial Crimean status referendum, renamed itself State Council.)	PR

== See also ==
- Chairman of the Verkhovna Rada
