= Semydviria =

Rural settlement in Crimea

Semydviria Семидвіря
- Rural settlement
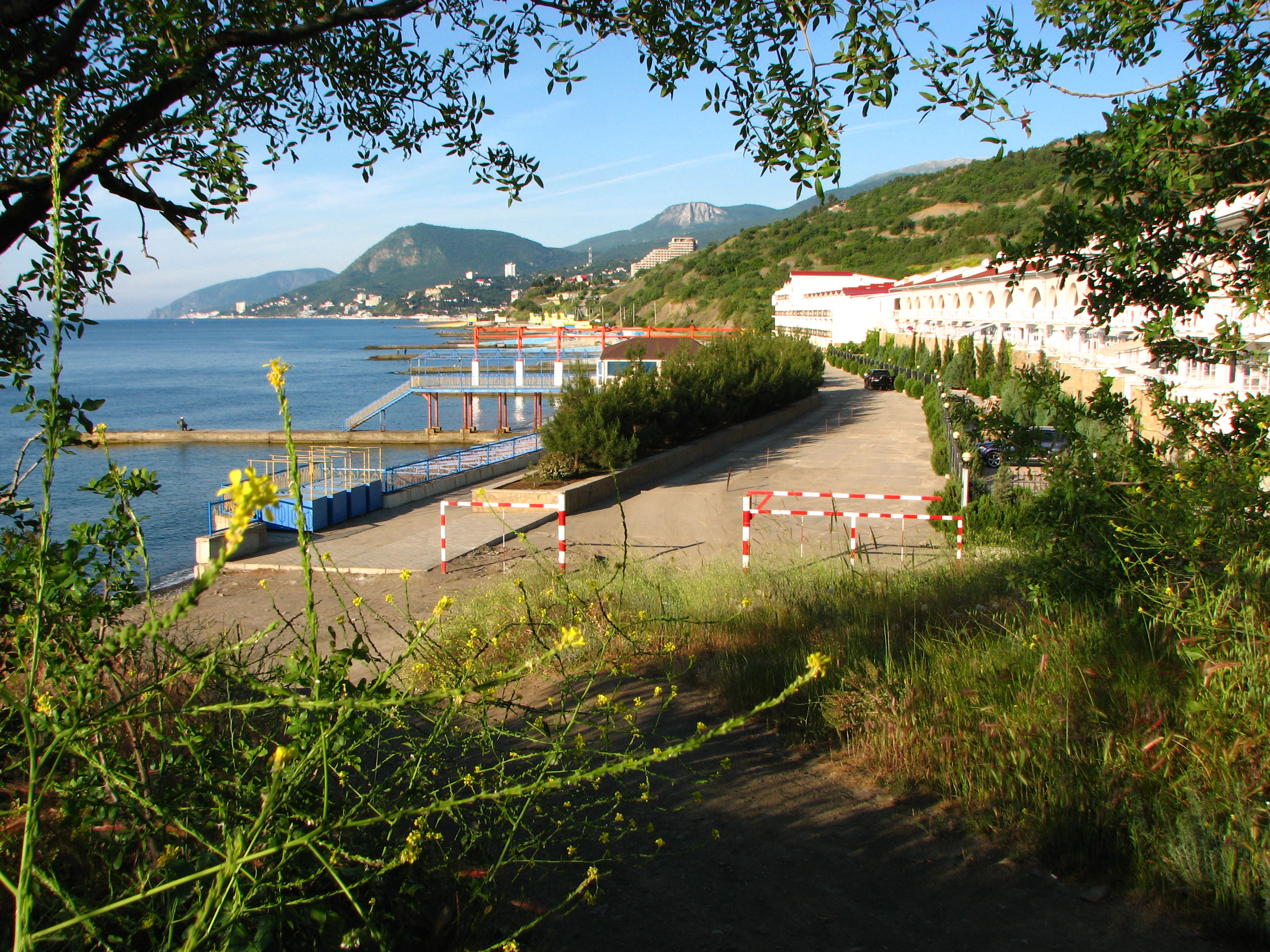

- Interactive map of Semydviria
- Location of Semydviria in Crimea Semydviria (Crimea)
- Coordinates: 44.718889°N 34.463889°E
- Country (de jure)^{1}: Disputed: Ukraine (de jure); Russia (de facto)
- Region: (Autonomous Republic of Crimea) Crimea^{1}
- Municipality: Alushta

Population (2001 census)
  - Total: 11
- Time zone: UTC+2 (EET)
  - Summer (DST): UTC+3 (EEST)
- Postal code: 98563
- Area code: +380 6560
- ^{1} Autonomous Republic of Crimea (de jure) or Republic of Crimea (de facto), depending on jurisdiction.

Semydviria (Ukrainian: Семидвіря, until 1944 Єді Ев, Crimean Tatar: Yedi Ev; Russian: Семидворье) is a rural settlement (Posyolok; Ukrainian: Селище) in Alushta Municipality in the Autonomous Republic of Crimea, on the southeastern coast of Crimea, about 3 kilometres (1.9 mi) east of Alushta.

== Demographics ==
As of the 2001 Ukrainian census, the settlement had 11 inhabitants, whose native languages were 18.18% Ukrainian and 81.82% Russian.
