= Lazurne =

Lazurne (Ukrainian: Лазурне) may refer to the following places in Ukraine:

- Lazurne (urban-type settlement), urban-type settlement in Skadovsk Raion, Kherson Oblast
- Lazurne, Crimea, village in Alushta Municipality
- Lazurne, Zaporizhzhia Oblast, village in Melitopol Raion
