= Mikhail Polyakov =

Mikhail Polyakov may refer to:

- Mikhail Polyakov (artist) (1903-1978), Russian graphic artist from Academia, a Soviet publishing house
- Mikhail Kharitonovich Polyakov (1884-1938), Soviet statesman, Chairman of the Executive Committee of Crimea
- Mikhail Nikolayevich Polyakov (1895-?), Ukrainian Bolshevik, member of the Ukrainian Supreme Soviet
- Mikhail Polyakov, Russian doctor, protagonist in the 2008 Russian film Morphine

== See also ==
- Polyakov
