= 1991 Crimean autonomy referendum =

20 January 1991
- Do you support re-establishing the Crimean Autonomous Soviet Socialist Republic as a subject of the Union SSR and a participant of the Union Treaty?

Results
Choice	Votes	%
Yes	1,343,855	94.30%
No	81,254	5.70%
Valid votes	1,425,109	98.90%
Invalid or blank votes	15,910	1.10%
Total votes	1,441,019	100.00%
Registered voters/turnout	1,770,841	81.37%

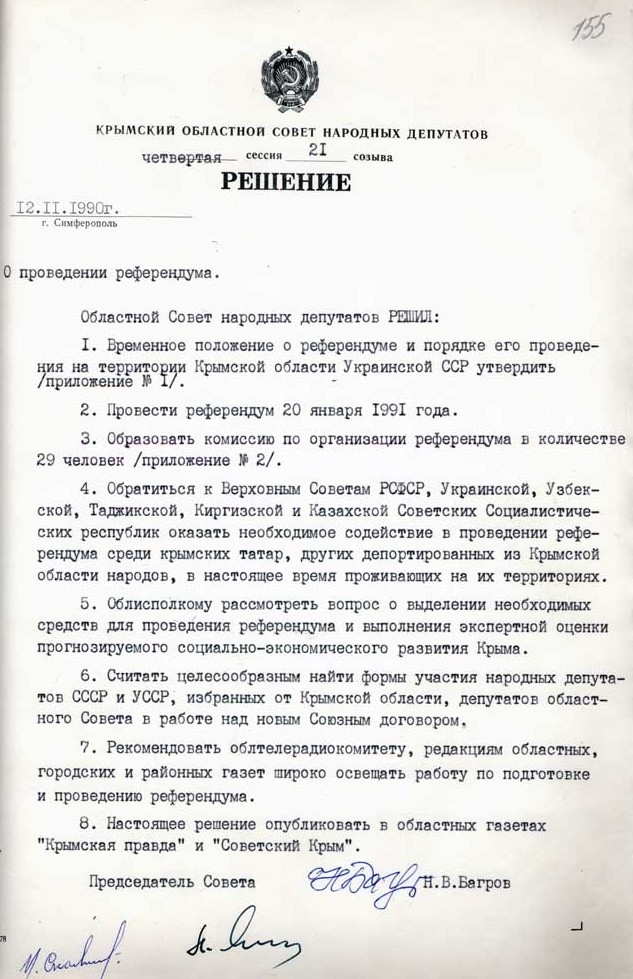
The decision of the Crimean Regional Council to hold a referendum of 12 November 1990 signed by N.V. Bagrov

A referendum on autonomy was held in the Crimean Oblast of the Ukrainian SSR on 20 January 1991, two months before the 1991 All-Union referendum. Voters were asked whether they wanted to re-establish the Crimean Autonomous Soviet Socialist Republic, which had been abolished in 1945. The proposal was approved by 94% of voters.

After the referendum, the Crimean oblast was made an Autonomous Soviet Socialist Republic within the Ukrainian SSR.

== Background ==
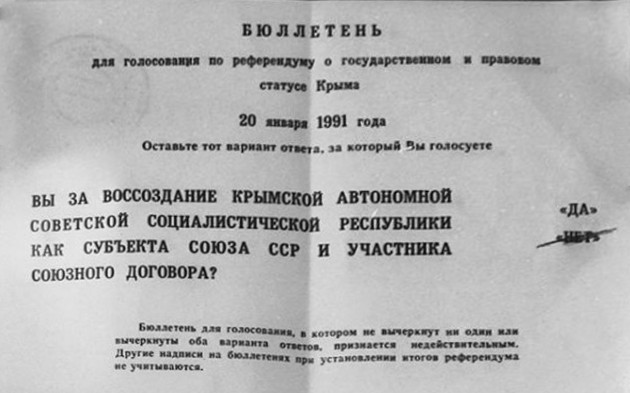
The ballot used in the referendum

The Crimean ASSR was originally created in 1921, as part of the Russian SFSR in the Soviet Union. Crimea was invaded by Nazi Germany during World War II, and when the region was reclaimed by the USSR in 1944, the Crimean Tatars and other ethnic groups were deported to Central Asia, and the ASSR was dissolved in 1945 with Crimea becoming an oblast of the Russian SSR. On 5 February 1954, it was transferred to the Ukrainian SSR. During the collapse of the Soviet Union at the start of the 1990s, the Russian SFSR declared itself sovereign on 12 June 1990 and the Ukrainian SSR declared itself sovereign on 16 July 1990.

In September 1990 the Soviet of People's Deputies of the Crimean Oblast called for the restoration of the Crimean Autonomous Soviet Socialist Republic together with the previous level of autonomy that the peninsula had enjoyed under the ASSR.

The referendum did not just call for the restoration for the ASSR, but further called for Crimea to be a participant in the New Union Treaty – an ultimately futile attempt by Mikhail Gorbachev to reconstitute the USSR. This would have meant that Crimea would have been a sovereign subject of the renewed USSR and separate from the Ukrainian SSR.

=== Decision on carrying out referendum (text) ===
- Temporary resolution about referendum and order of carrying it out on territory of Crimean Oblast of the Ukrainian SSR is to be approved (annex #1)
- Carry out referendum on 20 January 1991
- Create a commission in organization of the referendum consisting of 29 people (annex #2)
- Appeal to Supreme Councils of the RSFSR, Ukrainian, Uzbek, Tajik, Kirgiz, and Kazakh Soviet Socialist Republics to render a necessary cooperation in carrying out the referendum among the Crimean Tatars and other people who were deported out of the Crimean Oblast and currently reside on territory of the mentioned republics
- The Oblast Executive Committee must review the issue of allocating necessary funds for carrying out the referendum and make an expert analysis of the forecasted social and economic development of Crimea
- Consider expedient to find ways of participating in preparation for the new Union treaty both people deputies of the USSR and the UkrSSR elected from Crimean Oblast as well as the regional council's deputies
- To recommend for the Regional Tele- and Radio Committee and editors of regional, cities and districts newspapers widely publicize all activities in preparation and carrying out the referendum
- The present decision is to be published in regional newspapers "Krymskaya Pravda" and "Sovetskiy Krym"

== Results ==
Choice	Votes	%
For	1,343,855	94.30
Against	81,254	5.70
Total	1,425,109	100.00
Valid votes	1,425,109	98.90
Invalid/blank votes	15,910	1.10
Total votes	1,441,019	100.00
Registered voters/turnout	1,770,841	81.37
Source: KIA News

== Aftermath ==
Following the referendum, the Supreme Soviet of the Ukrainian SSR passed the law "On Restoration of the Crimean Autonomous Soviet Socialistic Republic as part of USSR" on 12 February 1991, restoring Crimea's autonomous status. In September 1991, the Crimean parliament declared state sovereignty for Crimea as a constituent part of Ukraine.

It has been alleged that the Crimean parliament did not have the authority to make this decision, because according to USSR law, "On the procedure for resolving issues related to the withdrawal of a union republic from the USSR" from (3 April 1990) this issue could only be resolved via a referendum.
