= Crimea in the Soviet Union =

History of Crimea (1921–1991)

Crimean Autonomous Socialist Soviet Republic (Note: Крымская Автономная Социалистическая Советская Республика (Russian); Къырым Мухтар Социалист Совет Джумхуриети (Crimean Tatar); Кримська Автономна Соціалістична Радянська Республіка (Ukrainian)) (1921–1936) Crimean Autonomous Soviet Socialist Republic (1936–1945) Crimean Oblast (Note: Крымская область (Russian); Къырым виляети (Crimean Tatar); Кримська область (Ukrainian)) (1945–1991) Crimean Autonomous Soviet Socialist Republic (1991): Крымская Автономная Советская Социалистическая Республика (Russian); Къырым Мухтар Совет Социалист Джумхуриети (Crimean Tatar); Кримська Автономна Радянська Соціалістична Республіка (Ukrainian)
- ASSR of the Russian SFSR (1921–45); Oblast of the Russian SFSR (1945–54) and Ukrainian SSR (1954–91); ASSR of Ukrainian SSR (1991)
- 1921–1991
- Flag (1938–1945) Emblem (1938–1945)

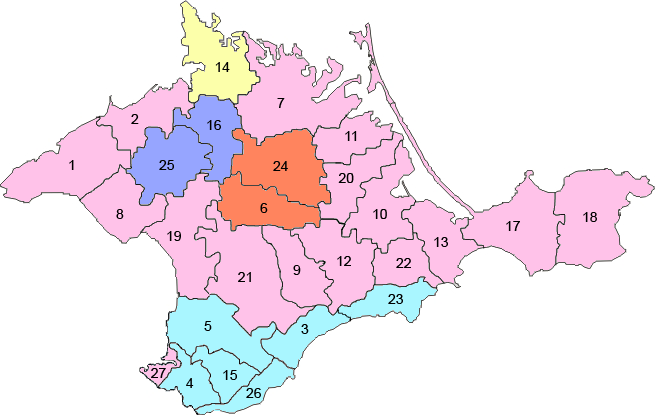
- Raions with national status, as of 1938; Crimean Tatar regions in light blue, Russian in pink, Jewish in indigo, German in orange, Ukrainian in yellow
- Capital: Simferopol
- Government
  - Type: Autonomous Soviet; Socialist Republic (1921–45; 1991); Oblast (1945–91)
- History
  - Evacuation of the Crimea: 13–16 November 1920
  - ASSR established: 18 October 1921
  - Reformed into oblast: 30 June 1945
  - Transferred to Ukraine: 19 February 1954
  - Autonomy regained: 12 February 1991
  - Dissolution of the Soviet Union: 26 December 1991
  - Renamed Republic of Crimea: 6 May 1992
Preceded by	Succeeded by
Government of South Russia	Crimean ASSR
- Today part of: Russia (de facto) Ukraine (de jure)

Several different governments controlled the Crimean Peninsula during the period of the Soviet Union, from 1921 to 1991. The government of Crimea from 1921 to 1936 was the Crimean Autonomous Socialist Soviet Republic, (Note: Russian: Крымская Автономная Социалистическая Советская Республика, romanized: Krymskaya Avtonomnaya Sotsialisticheskaya Sovetskaya Respublika; Ukrainian: Автономна Кримська Соціалістична Радянська Республіка, romanized: Avtonomna Krymska Sotsialistychna Radyanska Respublika, lit. 'Autonomous Crimean Socialist Soviet Republic') which was an Autonomous Soviet Socialist Republic within the Russian Soviet Federative Socialist Republic (SFSR); the name was altered slightly to the Crimean Autonomous Soviet Socialist Republic (Note: Modern Crimean Tatar: Къырым Мухтар Совет Социалист Джумхуриети; official Crimean Tatar name in the Yañalif: Qrьm Avtonomjalь Sovet Sotsialist Respuвlikasь; Russian: Крымская Автономная Советская Социалистическая Республика, romanized: Krymskaya Avtonomnaya Sovetskaya Sotsialisticheskaya Respublika; Ukrainian: Кримська Автономна Радянська Соціалістична Республіка, romanized: Krymska Avtonomna Radyanska Sotsialistychna Respublika) from 1936 to 1945.

Due to alleged collaboration of Crimean Tatars with Nazi Germany during World War II, all Crimean Tatars were deported by the Soviet government in 1944 and the peninsula was resettled with other peoples, mainly Russians and Ukrainians, leaving the autonomous republic without its titular nationality. It was thus downgraded to an oblast within the Russian SFSR on 30 June 1945. The oblast was transferred to the Ukrainian SSR in 1954. Following a state-sanctioned referendum in 1991, it became again an autonomous republic, within the Ukrainian SSR, and then within independent Ukraine after the breakup of the Soviet Union.

== History ==
=== Crimea within the Russian SFSR (1921–1954) ===
==== Crimean ASSR (1921–1945) ====
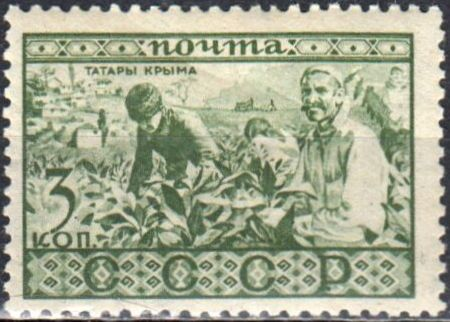
"Tatars of the Crimea" (Татары Крыма), 1933

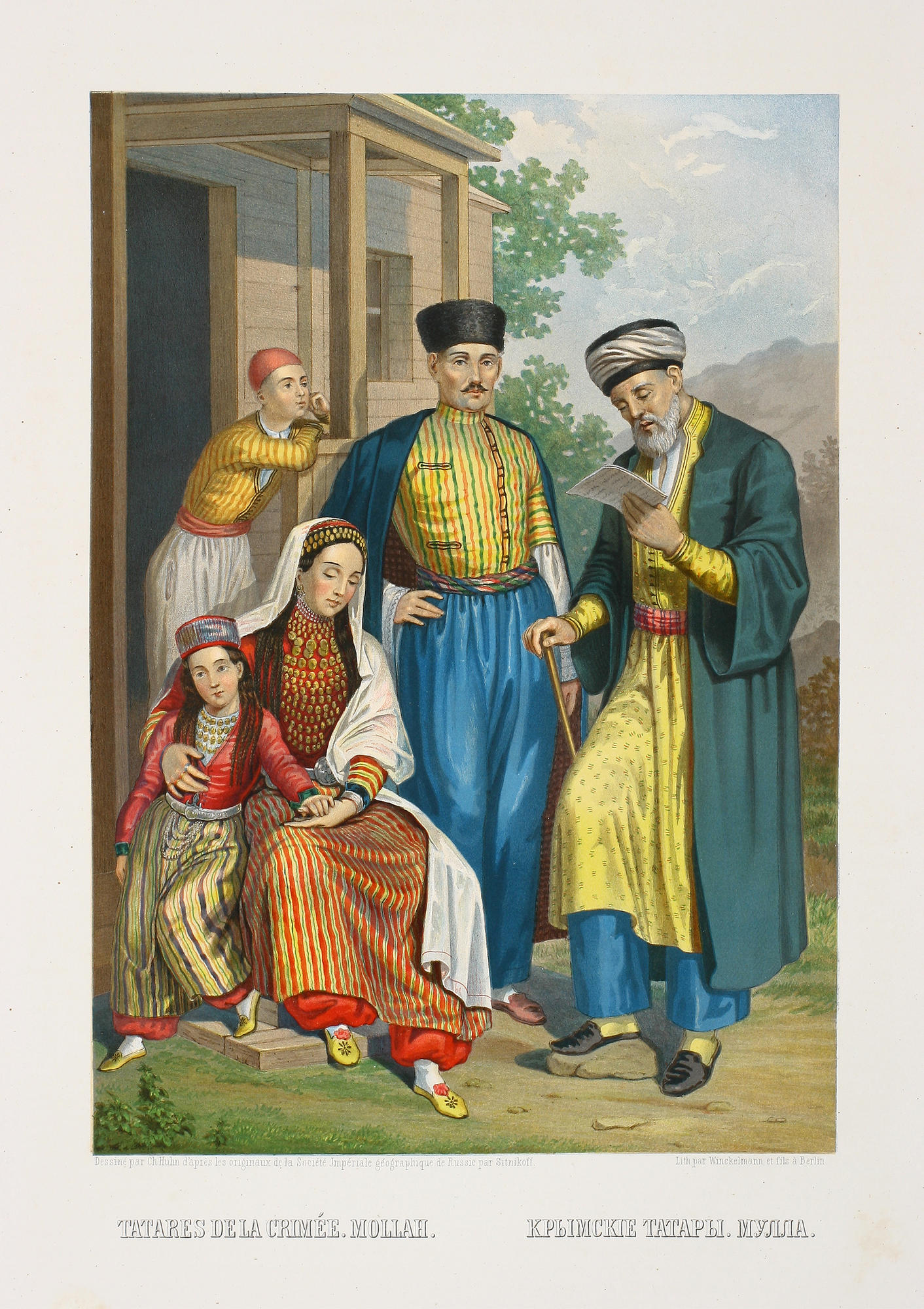
"Crimean Tatars" (Крымские татары), 1862

Manipulation in naming

On 18 October 1921, after a successful military campaign by the Red Army on the Southern Front of the Russian Civil War led to the White Army's evacuation from Crimea in late 1920, the Crimean Autonomous Socialist Soviet Republic was created within the Russian SFSR by the Bolsheviks. It was renamed the Crimean Autonomous Soviet Socialist Republic on 5 December 1936 by the Eighth Extraordinary Congress of Soviets of the USSR.

There were two unsuccessful attempts to establish Jewish autonomy in Crimea. The first attempt, conducted by the Soviet government with the support of the American Jewish Joint Distribution Committee, ended in the creation of the Jewish Autonomous Oblast in Birobidzhan, as the Soviet government feared establishing it in Crimea would provoke antisemitic sentiments. The second attempt, by the Jewish Anti-Fascist Committee between 1943 and 1944, led to the Night of the Murdered Poets and heightened persecution of Jews as Stalin feared the establishment of a Jewish republic in Crimea with American support.

Crimea was under de facto control of Nazi Germany from September 1942 to October 1943, administratively incorporated into Reichskommissariat Ukraine as Generalbezirk Krym-Taurien. Alfred Frauenfeld was appointed as General Commissar (although it seems that Frauenfeld spent most of his time in Crimea researching the peninsula's Gothic heritage and the actual government was in the hands of Erich von Manstein). During the war, there was also widespread resistance to the German occupation.

In 1944, under the pretext of alleged collaboration of the Crimean Tatars with the Nazi occupation regime, the Soviet government deported the Crimean Tatar people from Crimea, according to GKO Order No. 5859ss of Joseph Stalin and Lavrentiy Beria. Actual collaboration in the military sense had been rather limited, with a recorded 9,225 Crimean Tatars serving in anti-Soviet Tatar Legions and other German formed battalions, but there was in fact a surprisingly high degree of co-operation between the occupation government and the local administration; this has been significantly due to Frauenfeld's unwillingness to implement the policy of brutality towards the local population pursued by Reichskommissar Erich Koch, which led to a series of public conflict between the two men. The constitutional rights of the forcibly-resettled Tatars were restored with a decree dated September 5, 1967, but they were not allowed to return until the last days of the Soviet Union.

==== Crimean Oblast (1945–1954) ====
The Crimean ASSR was converted into the Crimean Oblast of the Russian SFSR on June 30, 1945, by a decree of the Presidium of the Supreme Soviet (published as a law on June 25, 1946). It was stripped of its autonomous status as a result of the alleged crimes of Crimean Tatars during World War II. 90% of toponyms were changed in 1944–1949 from mostly Crimean Tatar to Russian.

=== Crimea within the Ukrainian SSR (1954–1992) ===
==== Crimean Oblast (1954–1991) ====
On 19 February 1954, the oblast was transferred from the Russian SFSR to the Ukrainian SSR jurisdiction, on the basis of "the integral character of the economy, the territorial proximity and the close economic and cultural ties between the Crimea Province and the Ukrainian SSR" and to commemorate the 300th anniversary of Ukraine's union with Russia.

Sevastopol was a closed city due to its importance as the port of the Soviet Black Sea Fleet, and was attached to the Crimean Oblast only in 1978.

==== Crimean ASSR (1991–1992) ====
On 12 February 1991, the status of Crimea Oblast was changed to that of autonomous republic, the Crimean Autonomous Soviet Socialist Republic, by the Supreme Soviet of the Ukrainian SSR as the result of a state-sanctioned referendum held on 20 January 1991. 4 months later, on June 19, appropriate changes were made to the Constitution of the Ukrainian SSR.

With effect from 6 May 1992, the Autonomous Soviet Socialist Republic was transformed into the Republic of Crimea within Ukraine. On 21 September 1994 it was renamed the Autonomous Republic of Crimea by Verkhovna Rada. This name was used for Crimea (with the exception of the city of Sevastopol) in the new Ukrainian Constitution of 1996. The status of Sevastopol, due to its strategic importance as the main base of the Russian Black Sea Fleet, remained disputed between Ukraine and Russia until 1997 when it was agreed that it should be treated as a "city with special status" within Ukraine.

== Administrative divisions ==
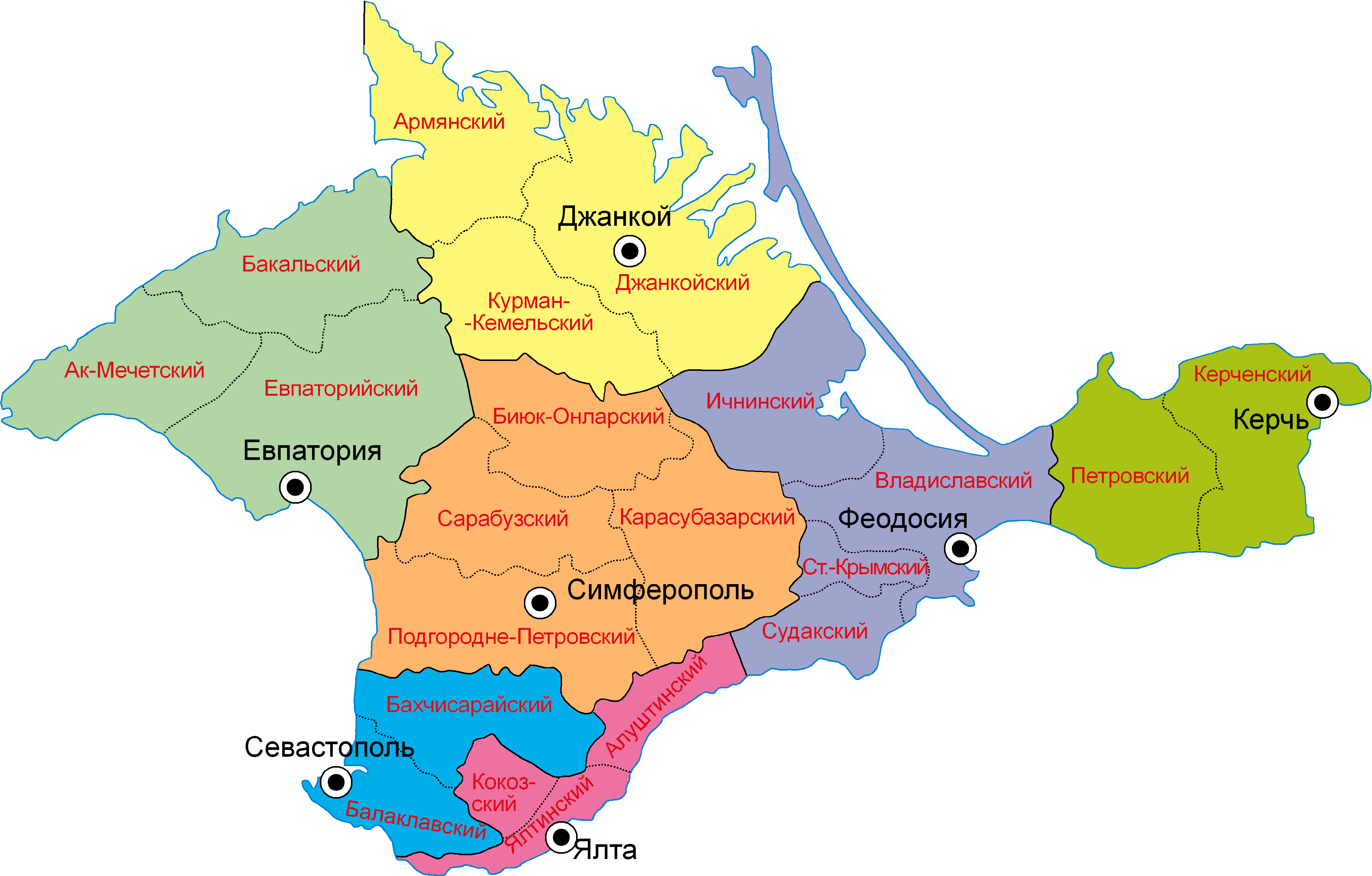
Okrugs and raions of the Crimean ASSR in May 1921 (in Russian)

With the establishment of the autonomous republic in 1921, Crimea was divided into seven okrugs, which in turn were divided into 20 raions:

- Dzhankoy
- Yevpatoriya
- Kerch
- Sevastopol
- Simferopol
- Feodosiya
- Yalta

In November 1923, the okrugs were abolished and 15 raions were created instead, but in 1924, five of these were abolished. On 30 October 1930, the remaining ten raions were reorganized into 16 new ones, and four cities under direct republican control. In 1935, 10 new raions were added and one abolished. In 1937, one more raion was established. The raions had national status as for Crimean Tatars, Russians, Jews, Germans and Ukrainians. By the beginning of World War II, all of these raions had lost their national status.

== Heads of state ==
=== Russian SFSR ===
Central Executive Committee

- 7 November 1921 – August 1924 Yuri Gaven (Janis Daumanis)
- August 1924 – 28 January 1928 Veli İbraimov
- 28 January 1928 – 20 February 1931 Memet Qubayev
- 20 February 1931 – 9 September 1937 İlyas Tarhan (arrested on September 8, 1937)
- 9 September 1937 – 21 July 1938 Abdulcelâl Menbariyev

Supreme Soviet

- 21 July 1938 – 18 May 1944 Abdulcelâl Menbariyev (expelled from Crimea in 1944 with the rest of Crimean Tatars)
- 18 May 1944 – 30 June 1945 Nadezhda Sachyova (acting)

=== Ukrainian SSR/Ukraine ===
- 22 March 1991 – 9 May 1994 Mykola Bahrov

== Heads of government ==
=== Chairmen of Revkom ===
- 16 November 1920 – 20 February 1921 Béla Kun
- 20 February 1921 – 7 November 1921 Mikhail Poliakov (become the one of NKVD troika)

=== Council of People's Commissars ===
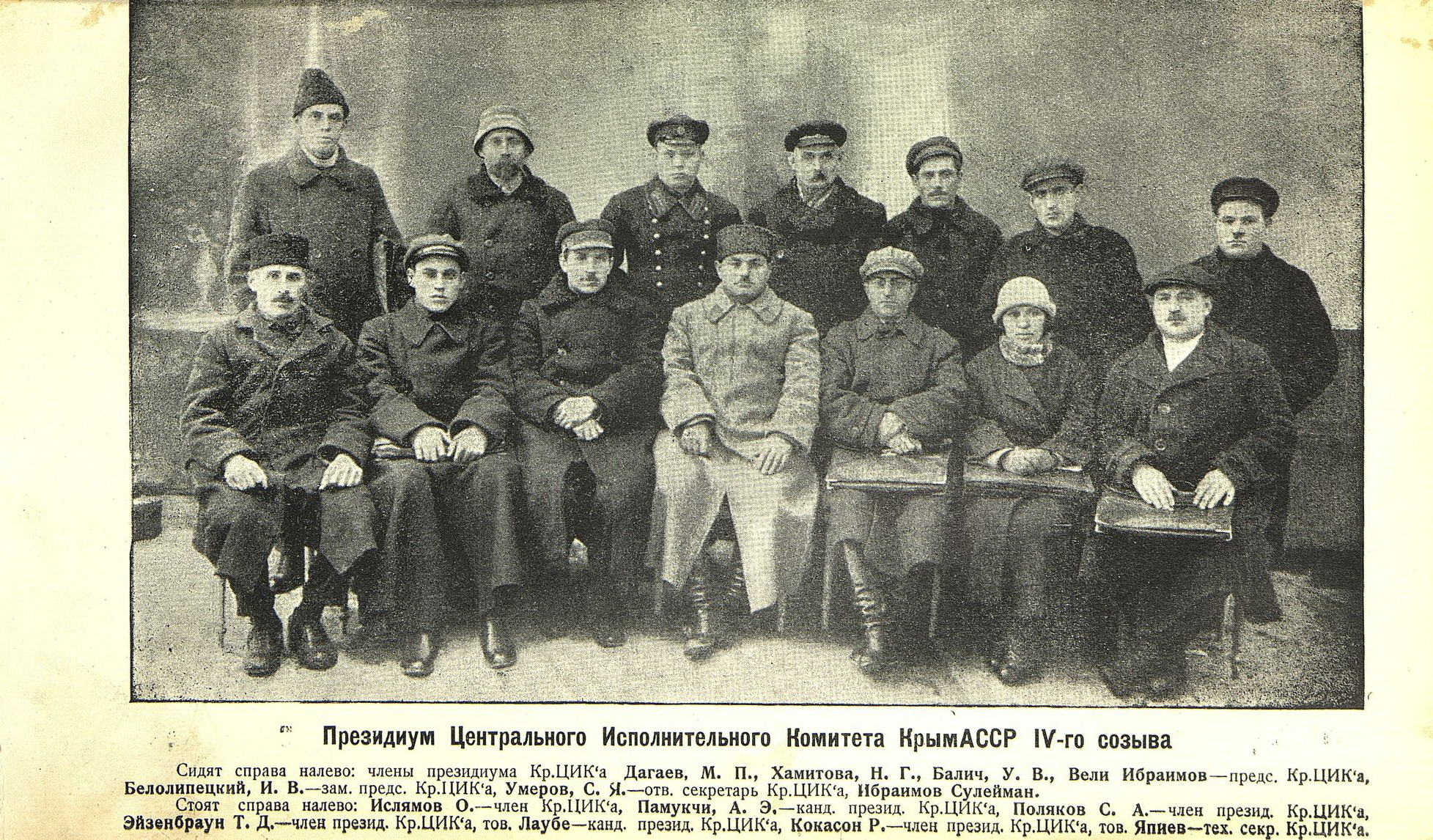
Presidium of the Central Executive Committee of the Crimean ASSR, 1925.

- 11 November 1921 – 16 May 1924 Sakhib-Garey Said-Galiyev
- 16 May 1924 – May 1924 I. Goncharov (acting)
- May 1924 – 21 March 1926 Osman Deren-Ayerly
- 21 March 1926 – May 1929 Emir Shugu
- May 1929 – 16 September 1937 Abduraim Samedinov (arrested September 17, 1937)
- 1937 – 5 April 1942 Memet Ibraimov
- 5 April 1942 – 18 May 1944 Ismail Seyfullayev (under de facto control of Nazi Germany during 1 September 1942 to 23 October 1943)
- 18 May 1944 – 30 June 1945 Aleksandr Kabanov

=== Council of Ministers ===
- 22 March 1991 – 20 May 1993 Vitaliy Kurashik

== Principal chekists ==
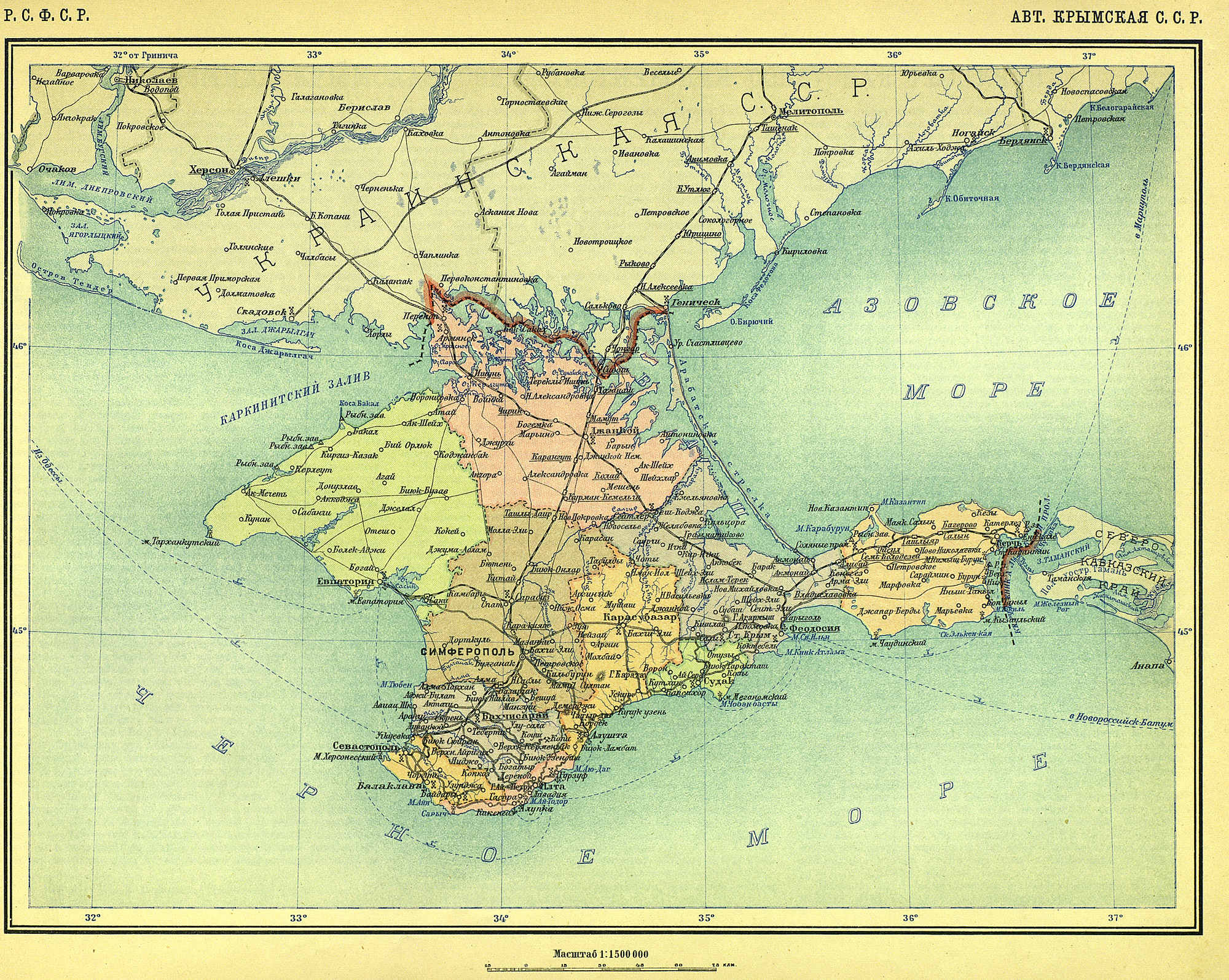
Map of the Crimean ASSR in 1927

Cheka

- until April 1921 Mikhail Vikhman (later in Chernihiv)
- April 1921 – June 1921 Smirnov
- 20 June 1921 – 1921 Fyodor Fomin (transferred to Kiev)
- 11 November 1921 – February 1922 Aleksandr Rotenberg

Crimea GPU

- February 1922 – 11 September 1922 Aleksandr Rotenberg
- 11 September 1922 – 25 April 1923 Stanislav Redens

Merged GPU

- 25 April 1923 – 9 June 1924 Stanislav Redens
- 20 May 1924 – 29 July 1925 Sergei Szwarz (transferred to the Special department of the Black Sea Navy)
- 1925 Aleksandr Toropkin (transferred to Ural)
- October 1926 – 26 April 1928 Ivan Apeter (transferred to the Special department of the Black Sea Navy)

OGPU

- 26 April 1928 – December 1929 Grigoriy Rapoport (transferred to Belarus Military District)
- 23 January 1930 – 10 July 1934 Eduard Salins (Eduards Saliņš)

Narkom of State Security

- 26 February 1941 – 31 July 1941 Major Grigoriy Karanadze
- 5 October 1943 – 5 July 1945 Commissar of the 3rd rank Pyotr Fokin

== See also ==
- Crimea Regional Committee of the Communist Party of Ukraine
- List of chairmen of the Executive Committee of Crimea
