= Olimkent =

Alimkent
- urban-type settlement
- Location in Uzbekistan
- Coordinates: 40°57′26″N 69°09′47″E
- Country: Uzbekistan
- Region: Tashkent Region
- District: Oqqoʻrgʻon District
- Urban-type settlement: 1967

Population (1989)
  - Total: 6,435
- Time zone: UTC+5 (UZT)

Olimkent (Uzbek: Olimkent/Олимкент, Russian: Алимкент, romanized: Alimkent) is an urban-type settlement in Tashkent Region, Uzbekistan. It is part of Oqqoʻrgʻon District. The town population in 1989 was 6435 people.
