= Oqqoʻrgʻon =

- City
- Location in Uzbekistan
- Coordinates: 40°52′35″N 69°02′43″E
- Country: Uzbekistan
- Region: Tashkent Region
- District: Oqqoʻrgʻon District
- Town status: 1980

Population (2016)
  - Total: 11,900
- Time zone: UTC+5 (UZT)

Oqqoʻrgʻon (Uzbek: Оққўрғон/Oqqo’rg’on) is a city in Tashkent Region, Uzbekistan. It is the administrative center of Oqqoʻrgʻon District. Its population is 11,900 (2016).

Its inhabitants are mostly Uzbeks, as well as Russians, Kazakhs, Tajiks, Koreans, Tatars and other nationalities.
