= Sergei Tsekov =

Russian politician (born 1953)

- Сергей Цеков
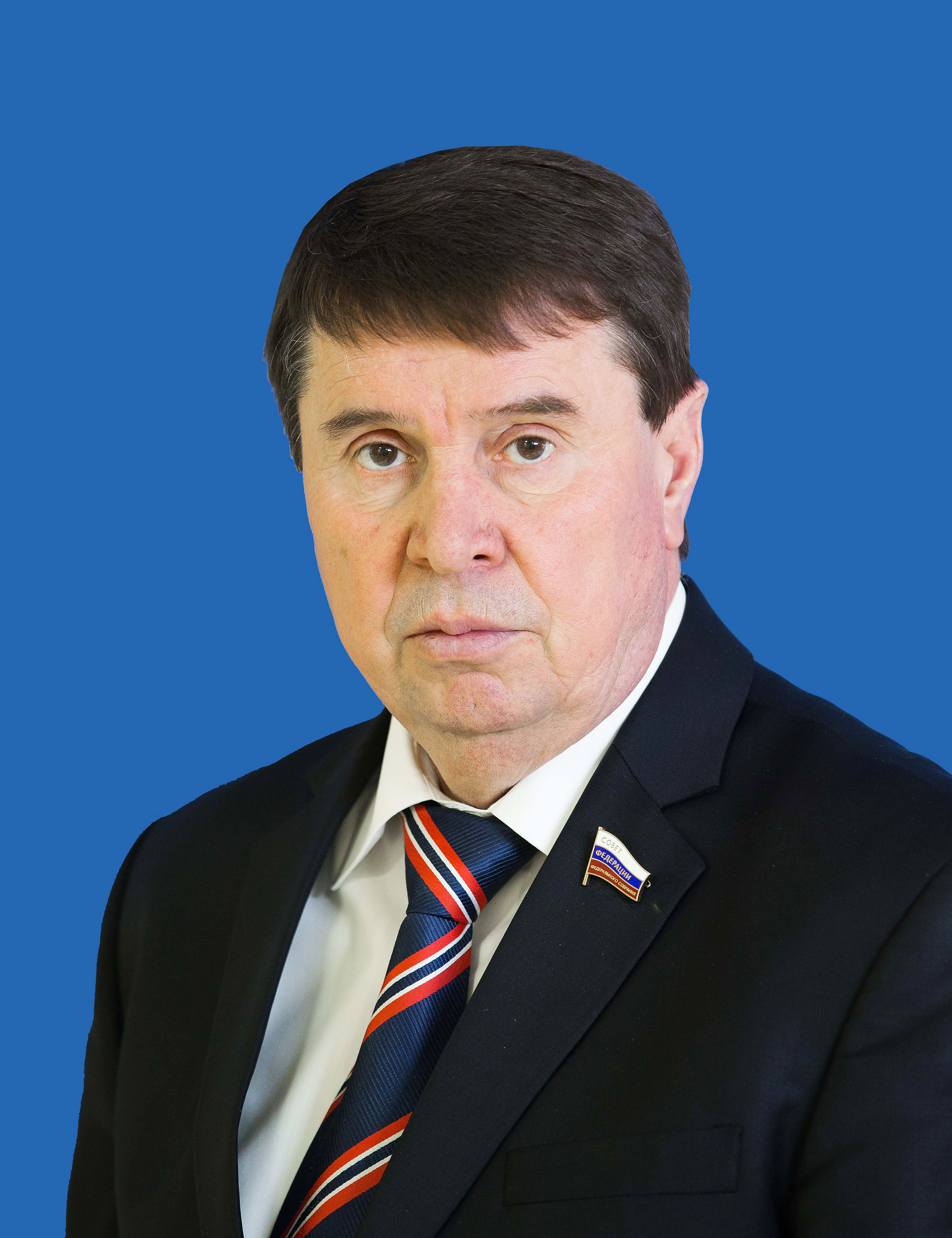
- Official portrait, 2014

First deputy chairman of the State Council of the Republic of Crimea
- Incumbent
- Assumed office 12 September 2024

Senator Federation Council of Russia from the legislative power of the Republic of Crimea
- In office 26 March 2014 – 10 September 2024 Serving with Olga Kovitidi
- Preceded by: Seat established
- Succeeded by: Sergey Karjakin

Deputy chair of the Council of ministers of the Autonomous Republic of Crimea
- In office 19 May 2006 – 5 October 2009
- In office 19 March 2010 – 16 November 2010
- In office 28 February – 17 March 2014

Chairman of the Verkhovna Rada of the Autonomous Republic of Crimea
- In office 10 May 1994 – 6 July 1995
- Preceded by: Mykola Bahrov
- Succeeded by: Yevheniy Suprunyuk

Deputy of the Verkhovna Rada of the Autonomous Republic of Crimea
- In office 10 May 1994 – 28 February 2014

People's Deputy of the Verkhovna Rada of Ukraine
- In office 15 May 1990 – 10 May 1994

Personal details
- Born: 28 September 1953 (age 72) Simferopol, Crimea Oblast, Russian SFSR, Soviet Union (now disputed)
- Party: Party of Regions (before 2014); United Russia (since 2014)
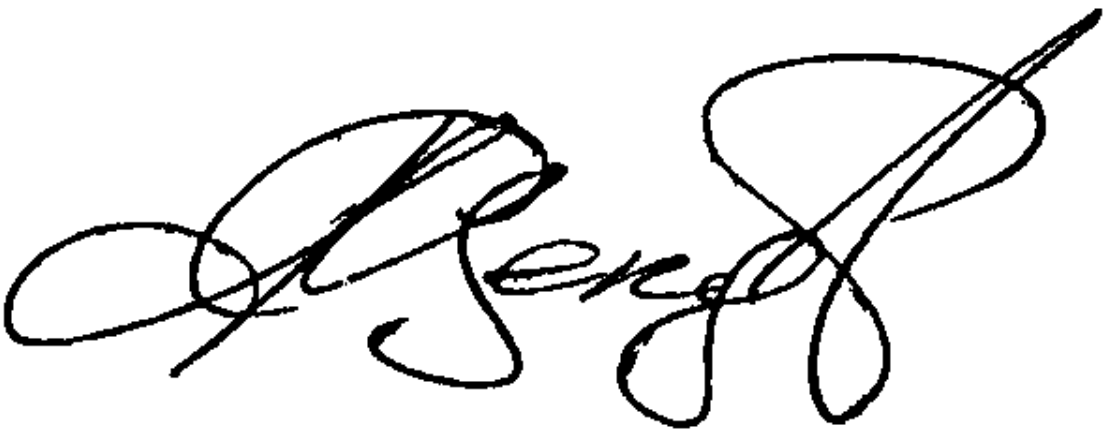
- Signature

Sergei Pavlovich Tsekov (Russian: Сергей Павлович Цеков, Ukrainian: Сергій Павлович Цеков, romanized: Serhii Pavlovych Tsekov; born 28 September 1953 in Simferopol) is a Russian politician. First deputy chairman of the State Council of the Republic of Crimea from 12 September 2024. He was previously a Senator Federation Council of Russia from the legislative power of the Republic of Crimea from Crimea from 26 March 2014 to 10 September 2024.

== Biography ==
Tsekov was born on 28 September 1953 in Simferopol, which was then part of the Russian SFSR in the Soviet Union. In 1979, he graduated from the Medical Crimean Federal University, with a specialty in general medicine. Afterwords, he worked at the Dzhankoy Central District Hospital until 1979 as a surgeon, before becoming a surgeon and later Head of the Surgical Department at the Saki Central District Hospital until 1994.

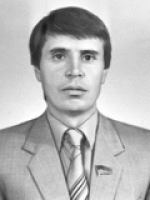
Tsekov as a Member of the Verkhovna Rada in 1990

A longtime pro-Russian activist as a member of the Party of Regions (until 2009) and then the Russian Unity party, he voted against the ratification of the Ukrainian declaration of independence in 1991 while serving as a member of the Ukrainian Supreme Soviet, which was then succeeded by the Verkhovna Rada. He became the Chair of the legislature of his native Crimea in 1994, serving for one year. As an experienced member of the council, he was chosen by his successors as their deputy several times. During this time, he was Executive Director and Chairman of the Russian Community of Crimea. As a deputy, he was strongly supportive of Viktor Yanukovych and his call for a repeat of the second round of the 2004 Ukrainian presidential election and was anti-Orange Revolution. In line with this, in 2008 he called for the recognition of the independence of Abkhazia and South Ossetia, and supported Russia during 2008 Russo-Georgian War.

Tsekov was a key player on the Supreme Council of Crimea in the events following the 2014 Ukrainian Revolution, during which he refused to recognise the legitimacy of the new government that came to power and successfully pushed for the peninsula's integration with Russia. After the annexation, he was placed on the sanctions list of the United Kingdom and has since been added to similar lists of other countries.

Tsekov took office as a Russian Federation Senator in 2014 after being appointed to represent his region by the Supreme Council. Since 2019, he serves on the Committee on International Affairs.

Preceded by Mykola Bahrov	Chairman of the Supreme Council of Crimea; 1994–1995	Succeeded by Yevheniy Suprunyuk
