= Crimea Regional Committee of the Communist Party of the Soviet Union =

The Crimea Regional Committee of the Communist Party of the Soviet Union, commonly referred to as the Crimea CPSU obkom, was the position of highest authority in the Crimean ASSR (1921–1945) and Crimean Oblast (1945–1954) of the Russian SFSR. The position was created on November 20, 1920, and abolished on August 26, 1991. The First Secretary was a de facto appointed position usually by the Politburo or the General Secretary himself.

After 1954 the regional committee was part of the Crimean Oblast (1954–1991) of the Ukrainian SSR (from February 19, 1954).

== List of First Secretaries of the Crimea Regional Committee of the Communist Party of the Soviet Union ==
Name	Term of Office		Life years
Name	Start	End	Life years
First Secretaries of the Communist Party
Rozaliya Zalkind (Zemlyachka)	November 20, 1920	January 6, 1921	1876–1947
Adolf Lide	January 6, 1921	March 13, 1921	1895–1941
Ivan Akulov	March 13, 1921	November 6, 1921	1888–1937
Abram Izrailovich	November 6, 1921	October 24, 1922	1883–1937
Nikolay Ufimtsev	October 25, 1922	May 13, 1924	1889–1938
Ivan Nosov	May 13, 1924	June 1925	1888–1937
Vasily Vashkevich (Note: Acting)	1925	1925	1892–1972
Sergey Petropavlovsky	August 7, 1925	August 30, 1927	1886–1940s
Dmitry Zhivov	September 1927	December 8, 1929	1896–1939
Nikolay Kozlov	December 17, 1929	May 11, 1930	1893–1973
Aykaz Kostanyan	May 12, 1930	September 1930	1898–1938
Evgeniy Veger	October 1930	January 1933	1899–1938
Borys Semyonov	February 1933	December 28, 1936	1890–1937
Lavrentiy Kartvelishvili (Lavrentyev)	December 28, 1936	July 13, 1937	1890–1938
Nikolay Schuchkin	July 13, 1937	October 10, 1938	1895–1938
Vladimir Bulatov (Note: In Russian SFSR exile from 1942)	January 18, 1939	May 21, 1944	1909–1999
Pavel Tyulyayev	June 14, 1944	June 30, 1945	1905–1946
First Secretaries of the Oblast Committee of the Communist Party
Pavel Tyulyayev	June 30, 1945	June 22, 1946	1905–1946
Nikolay Solovyov	July 30, 1946	August 6, 1949	1903–1950
Pavel Titov	August 6, 1949	January 16, 1954	1907–1990

== List of First Secretaries of the Crimea Regional Committee of the Communist Party of Ukraine ==
Name	Term of Office		Life years
Name	Start	End	Life years
Dmitrii Polyansky	January 16, 1954	December 14, 1955	1917–2001
Vasyl Komyahov	December 14, 1955	January 6, 1961	1911–1966
Ivan Lutak (Note: For Agriculture January 9, 1963 – December 4, 1964)	January 6, 1961	January 1967	1919–2009
Mykola Surkin (Note: For Industry)	January 11, 1963	December 4, 1964	1910–?
Mykola Kirichenko	April 5, 1967	July 1, 1977	1923–1986
Viktor Makarenko	July 1, 1977	August 1987	1931–2007
Andriy Hirenko	September 1987	September 25, 1989	1936–2017
Mykola Bahrov	September 25, 1989	February 12, 1991	1939–2015
First Secretaries of the Communist Party
Mykola Bahrov	February 12, 1991	April 9, 1991	1939–2015
Leonid Hrach	April 10, 1991	August 26, 1991	1948–

== See also ==
- List of Chairmen of the Executive Committee of Crimea
- Crimean ASSR
- Crimean Oblast

== Sources ==
- World Statesmen.org
