= Andriy Hirenko =

Soviet-Ukrainian politician (1936–2017)

Andriy Mykolayevich Hirenko (or Andrei Nikolayevich Girenko) was a Soviet and Ukrainian politician from before the dissolution of the Soviet Union. He headed the Komsomol of Ukraine and was the 1st Party Secretary in Kherson and Crimea.

Hirenko was born in 1936 as Adolf which he changed in 1972. He died in late December 2017.

Party political offices
Preceded by Aleksandr Kapto (Oleksandr Kapto)	1st Secretary of the Komsomol of Ukraine; 1972–1975	Succeeded by Anatoliy Kornienko (Anatoliy Koniyenko)
Preceded by Ivan Mozgovoi (Ivan Mozghovyi)	1st Secretary of the Kherson Oblast Committee; 1980–1987	Succeeded by Mikhail Kushnerenko (Mykhailo Kushnerenko)
Preceded by Viktor Makarenko	1st Secretary of the Crimean Oblast Committee; 1987–1989	Succeeded by Nikolai Bagrov (Mykola Bahrov)
