= Boris Deich =

Ukrainian politician (1938–2022)

Borys Deich
- Борис Дейч
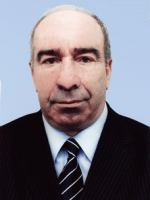
- Deich's Portrait as a Member of the Verkhovna Rada in 2006

Member of the Verkhovna Rada
- In office 12 May 2006 – 26 October 2014

Chairman of the Supreme Council of Crimea
- In office 29 April 2002 – 12 May 2006
- Preceded by: Leonid Hrach
- Succeeded by: Anatoliy Hrytsenko

Personal details
- Born: Borys Davydovych Deich; 23 August 1938 Sighetu Marmației, Romania
- Died: 7 February 2022 (aged 83) Moscow, Russia

Borys Davydovych Deich (Ukrainian: Борис Давидович Дейч; 23 August 1938 – 7 February 2022) was a Ukrainian politician. Deich served as the Chairman of the Supreme Council of Crimea from 2002 to 2006 and as a member of the Verkhovna Rada from 2006 to 2014 as a member of the Party of Regions. He voted in favor of the referendum for the annexation of Crimea by Russia.

== Biography ==
Deich was born on 23 August 1938 in the village of Sighetu Marmației, which was then part of the Kingdom of Romania. After moving to the Crimea in 1955, he started working at the Simferopol District Industrial Plant and at the Azov District Industrial Combine. Up until 1974, he worked in a variety of positions at workshops afterwards, including the Soviet District Industrial Combine and at the Nyzhnohirsk District Consumer Union. He then achieved higher education in 1974, graduating from the Donetsk National University of Economics and Trade named after M. Tugan-Baranovsky, with a speicalization in trade economics and achieving the profession of economist.

After graduating, he worked in jobs in the tourism and resort industry as a director and manager within Sudak and Feodosia. By 1998, he had worked his way up to Director of the Sudak Holiday House and General Director of the JSC "Tourist and Health Complex, Sudak". He then entered politics, becoming the first deputy chairman of the Supreme Council of Crimea in May 1998, which he served as until April 2002.

In April 2002, he was elected Chairman of the Supreme Council of Crimea, which he did until 2006 when he was elected to the Verkhovna Rada. As a member of the Party of Regions, he served as a member of the Verkhovna Rada from 2006 until 2014. During this time, he voted in favour of the Kharkiv Pact, the law "On the Principles of State Language Policy", was part of the deputies who asked the Polish Sejm to recognise the Massacres of Poles in Volhynia and Eastern Galicia as a genocide, and was a strong supporter of anti-Euromaidan protests. He supported the annexation of Crimea by Russia, voting in favour of the referendum.

Deich died from COVID-19 in Moscow on 7 February 2022, at the age of 83. He had been transported there from his residence in Crimea after his condition worsened.

Preceded by Leonid Hrach	Chairman of the Supreme Council of Crimea; 2002–2006	Succeeded by Anatoly Gritsenko
