= Mykhailo Kushnerenko =

Ukrainian politician (1938–2021)

- Михайло Кушнеренко

Governor of Kherson Oblast
- In office 28 July 1997 – 7 April 1998
- Preceded by: Yurii Karasyk
- Succeeded by: Anatoliy Kasyanenko

Chairman of the Kherson Oblast Council
- In office 5 April 1990 – July 1994
- Succeeded by: Vitaly Zholobov

Chairman of the Kherson Regional executive committee
- In office January 1991 – March 1992
- Preceded by: Oleksandr Melnikov
- Succeeded by: position abolished
- In office 21 December 1983 – 11 July 1987
- Preceded by: Vasily Metlyaev
- Succeeded by: Oleksandr Melnikov

First Secretary of the Kherson Regional Committee of the Communist Party of Ukraine
- In office 23 June 1987 – August 1991
- Preceded by: Andriy Hirenko
- Succeeded by: position abolished

Personal details
- Born: Mykhailo Mykhailovych Kushnerenko; August 18, 1938 Strohanivka, Chaplynka Raion, Ukrainian SSR, Soviet Union
- Died: April 2, 2021 (aged 82) Kherson, Ukraine
- Party: CPSU

Mykhailo Mykhailovych Kushnerenko (Ukrainian: Михайло Михайлович Кушнеренко; 18 August 1938 – 2 April 2021) was a Ukrainian politician. He served as Governor of Kherson Oblast from 1997 to 1998, was a member of the Supreme Soviet of the Soviet Union and the Supreme Soviet of the Ukrainian Soviet Socialist Republic from 1989 to 1991. Kushnerenko also served on the Central Committee of the Communist Party of Ukrainian SSR from 1989 to 1991.

== Early life ==
Kushnerenko was born on 18 August 1938 in Strohanivka, which was then part of the Ukrainian SSR in the Soviet Union. After graduating from the Kherson Agricultural Institute, he worked as an inspector-organizer for the Kakhovka Production Collective for the kolkhoz there, before later working as a chief agronomist for a state farm in Tsiurupynsk Raion.

== Political career ==
In 1970, he was appointed Head of the Agricultural Department of the Tsiurupynsk Raion Executive Committee, before becoming chairman of the local kolkhoz within Tsiurupynsk. In 1975, he was also appointed Chairman of the Hola Prystan Raion.

After graduating from the Higher Party School under the Central Committee of the CPU, he started taking on higher positions within the Communist Party. In September 1979, he was appointed First Secretary of the Velyka Oleksandrivka District Committee, and by January 1983 was Head of the Agricultural Department of the Kherson Oblast Committee. From 1983 to 1987 he was Chairman of the Kherson Regional Executive Committee, and finally from 1987 up until the collapse of the Soviet Union he was First Secretary of the Kherson Regional Committee.

== Personal life ==
Kushnerenko died of complications from COVID-19 during the COVID-19 pandemic in Ukraine.
