= Kherson Regional Committee of the Communist Party of Ukraine =

Ukrainian SSR Oblast Government

The Kherson Regional Committee of the Communist Party of Ukraine, commonly referred to as the Kherson CPU obkom, was the position of highest authority in the Kherson Oblast, in the Ukrainian SSR of the Soviet Union. The position was created in April 1944, and abolished in August 1991. The First Secretary was a de facto appointed position usually by the Central Committee of the Communist Party of Ukraine or the First Secretary of the Communist Party of Ukraine.

== List of First Secretaries of the Communist Party of Kherson ==
Name	Term of Office		Life years
Name	Start	End	Life years
First Secretaries of the Oblast Committee of the Communist Party
Oleksiy Fedorov	April 1944	January 1949	1901–1989
Hryhoriy Hryshko	January 1949	March 1951	1906–1959
Vadym Onyshchenko	March 1951	February 1954	1911–19..
Volodymyr Druzhynin	February 1954	June 1956	1907–1976
Petro Yelistratov	June 1956	January 1962	1917–1987
Anton Kochubey (Note: For Agriculture January 14, 1963 – December 1964)	January 1962	October 1972	1909–1998
Volodymyr Khalapsin (Note: For Industry)	January 17, 1963	December 1964	1919–1998
Ivan Mozghovy	October 1972	March 28, 1980	1927–2005
Andriy Hirenko	March 28, 1980	June 23, 1987	1936–
Mykhailo Kushnerenko	June 23, 1987	August 1991	1938–

== See also ==
- Kherson Oblast

== Sources ==
- World Statesmen.org
