= İlyas Tarhan =

Soviet Crimean Tatar journalist, playwright, and politician (1900–1938)

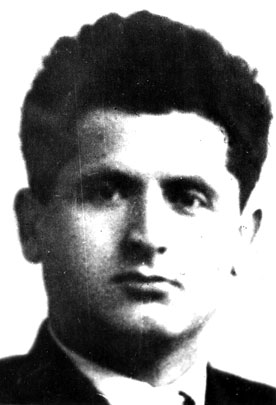

Chairman of the Central Executive Committee of the Crimean ASSR
- In office 20 February 1931 – 9 September 1937
- Preceded by: Memet Qubayev
- Succeeded by: Abdul Menbariev

Personal details
- Born: 1900 Körbekül, Taurida Governorate, Russian Empire (now Izobilne, Crimea)
- Died: 17 April 1938 (aged 37–38) Simferopol, Crimean ASSR, Russian SFSR, Soviet Union (now Crimea)
- Party: All-Union Communist Party (Bolshevik) (1919–1938)
- Education: Zincirli Madrasa

Military service
- Branch/service: Red Army; Partisans
- Battles/wars: Russian Civil War; Southern Front

İlyas Ümer oğlu Tarhan (Russian: Илья́с Уме́рович Тарха́н, romanized: Ilyas Umerovich Tarkhan; 1900 – 17 April 1938) was a Soviet Crimean Tatar journalist, playwright, and politician who served as Chairman of the Central Executive Committee of the Crimean ASSR from 1931 to 1937. He was also an editor of the Yaş Quvet newspaper and a member of the Union of Soviet Writers. Arrested during the Great Purge and charged with involvement in a Pan-Turkic counterrevolutionary organisation, he was executed in 1938 and rehabilitated in 1956.

== Early life and career ==
İlyas Ümer oğlu Tarhan was born in 1900 in the village of Körbekül (Izobilne), under the Russian Empire. His father was a landless farmer. From 1913 to 1917, he lived in the city of Kazan, studying at a Tatar school in the city. He graduated from the Zincirli Madrasa, and joined the Russian Communist Party (Bolshevik) in 1919. During the Russian Civil War, he was involved in partisan activities against the White movement in South Russia before supporting the communist underground in Turkey and being arrested. Afterwards, Tarhan returned to Crimea and joined the Komsomol, becoming its leader in Crimea.

== Career ==
From 1921 to 1925, Tarhan worked as the editor of the youth newspaper Yaş Quvet (lit. 'Young Power'). Afterwards, he began working as a member of the Communist Party in Sudak and Bakhchysarai. In this capacity, he participated in the persecution of both Veli İbraimov, Chairman of the Central Executive Committee of the Crimean ASSR, and Mamut Nadim, People's Commissar for Education.

On 20 February 1931, Tarhan became Chairman of the Central Executive Committee of the Crimean ASSR. Alongside his political career, he worked as a playwright, with Ucüm (lit. 'Attack') and Moskva ayta (lit. 'Moscow Speaks') premiering at cities across the Soviet Union in 1932 and 1934, respectively. On his initiative, the Crimean State Tatar Drama Theatre began construction in 1933. In 1934, he joined the Union of Soviet Writers, also becoming head of the Union of Crimean Writers. He also briefly worked as editor of the Crimean Tatar magazine of the regional committee, Bolşevik Yölu (lit. 'Bolshevik Way').

== Execution ==
On 8 September 1937, Tarhan was arrested and charged with leading an anti-Soviet pan-Turkic organisation, along with Abduraim Samedinov and Bilâl Çagar. The arrests of Tarhan, Samedinov, and Çagar served as a basis for an anti-Crimean Tatar campaign as part of the Great Purge. On 17 April 1938, during a court session, he retracted previous coerced concessions and pled not guilty. That day, he was sentenced to death, and executed the same day. Following his death, his property was confiscated by the Soviet government.

On 24 November 1956, Tarhan was posthumously rehabilitated by the Soviet government, with the statement on his rehabilitation reading, "Within the Crimean NKVD, where the investigation into the Tarhan case was conducted, from 1937 to 1938 unreasonable arrests, beatings of those arrested, falsification of investigative materials, and other gross violations of the law were allowed."
