= Memet Qubayev =

Soviet Crimean Tatar politician (1883–1937)

Chairman of the Central Executive Committee of the Crimean ASSR
- In office 28 January 1928 – 20 February 1931
- Preceded by: Veli İbraimov
- Succeeded by: İlyas Tarhan

Personal details
- Born: Memet İsmail Qubayev; 1885 Körbekül, Taurida Governorate, Russian Empire (now Izobilne, Crimea)
- Died: after 1937 (aged 51–52)
- Party: All-Union Communist Party (Bolshevik) (until 1931)

Military service
- Branch/service: Red Army; Partisans
- Battles/wars: Russian Civil War; Southern Front

Memet İsmail Qubayev (Russian: Меме́т Исмаи́л Куба́ев, romanized: Memet Ismail Kubayev; 1885 – after 1937) was a Soviet Crimean Tatar politician who served as Chairman of the Central Executive Committee of the Crimean Autonomous Soviet Socialist Republic from 1928 to 1931. During Qubayev's tenure, thousands of Crimean Tatars lost their land and were deported to the Urals as part of collectivisation and dekulakization campaigns.

== Biography ==
Memet İsmail Qubayev was born in 1885 in the village of Körbekül (now known as Izobilne), in the Taurida Governorate of the Russian Empire. By trade, Qubayev was a shoemaker, and he was illiterate. He first began to align with communism in 1918, as part of a general shift by Crimean Tatars from Milliy Firqa to the Russian Communist Party. During the Russian Civil War, he was a member of a partisan detachment. He was also involved in spreading propaganda opposing the White movement in South Russia, for which he was imprisoned.

After Crimean Tatar communist leader Veli İbraimov was removed from his position as Chairman of the Central Executive Committee of the Crimean ASSR, Qubayev was selected as his replacement, becoming chairman on 28 January 1928. During İbraimov's subsequent murder trial, Qubayev served as a public prosecutor alongside fellow Crimean Tatar communists İlyas Tarhan, Bilâl Çagar, and Abdulkadyr Gralov.

During Qubayev's rule, dekulakization was actively carried out, leading to the dispossession and deportation of thousands of kulaks. According to a 1938 report by Eduard Salyn, chief of the NKVD in the Crimean ASSR, 16,000 people were stripped of their property and set to be evicted on 26 March 1930. 4,325 families from the Crimean ASSR were sent into exile between 1930 and 1931, with 2,772 being sent to the Ural Mountains and 1,553 to the Northern Krai. By 1 May 1931, 50,000 ha (5,000,000 a) had been collectivised, primarily from Crimean Tatars. Qubayev protested these measures at a local party conference in Dzhankoi Raion, accusing the Soviet government of practicing Great Russian chauvinism in a matter that was destructive to Crimea's peoples, primarily the Crimean Tatars. In response to these statements, Qubayev was forcefully removed from the party and his position as Chairman of the Central Executive Committee.

On 3 February 1937, Qubayev was arrested by the Soviet authorities and charged with involvement in a counter-revolutionary action and anti-Soviet agitation. On 29 June 1937, he was found guilty and sentenced to ten years of hard labour. On 12 June 1968, nearly 30 years after originally being charged, Qubayev was rehabilitated by the Soviet government.
