= Anatoliy Hrytsenko (politician, born 1958) =

Ukrainian politician

- Анатолій Гриценко

11th Governor of Kherson Oblast
- In office 18 March 2010 – 18 June 2010
- Preceded by: Borys Silenkov
- Succeeded by: Mykola Kostyak

8th Chairman of the Supreme Council of the Autonomous Republic of Crimea
- In office 12 May 2006 – 17 March 2010
- Preceded by: Borys Deich
- Succeeded by: Vladimir Konstantinov

5th Chairman of the Supreme Council of the Autonomous Republic of Crimea
- In office 13 February 1997 – 29 April 1998
- Preceded by: Vasyl Kiselov
- Succeeded by: Leonid Hrach

Personal details
- Born: Anatoliy Pavlolyvch Hrytsenko; 21 September 1958 (age 67) Kerch, Crimea, Soviet Union
- Party: Party of Regions

Anatoliy Pavlolyvch Hrytsenko (Ukrainian: Анатолій Павлович Гриценко; born 21 September 1958) is a Ukrainian politician who had last served as the 11th Governor of Kherson Oblast in 2010.

He had served as Chairman of the Verkhovna Rada of the Autonomous Republic of Crimea for the first term from 1997 to 1998 and the second term from 2006 to 2010.

He had been a member of the Verkhovna Rada of the Autonomous Republic of Crimea from 1994 to 1998, until the role being the chairman.

He was member of the "Party of Regions, Crimean Republican Alliance; Party "Russian Bloc", and the Crimean Republican Organization - Bloc "For Yanukovych!".

== Biography ==
Hrytsenko was born in Kerch on 21 September 1958. He graduated from the Chistopil secondary school of the Leninsky district of the Crimean region in 1976. That August, he started working as a locksmith of the Chistopil branch of "Agricultural Machinery" of the Leninsky district of the Crimean region.

From November 1976 to November 1979, he served in the Soviet Navy.

From February 1980, he worked as a mechanic at the Chistopil branch of "Agricultural Machinery" of the Leninsky district, from June to August 1980, he worked at a brick factory in Arkadak, Saratov region.

From October 1980 to January 1987, he was a sports instructor at the collective farm "Batkivshchyna" of the Leninsky district.

Between January 1987 and July 1995, he was the head of the executive committee of the Chistopil Village Council of People's Deputies of the Leninsky district. He has a higher education, as in 1989, he graduated from the Crimean Order "Badge of Honor" from the agricultural institute named after M. I. Kalinin, majoring in "economics and organization of agriculture", received the qualification of economist-organizer of agricultural production.

From July 1995 to October 1996, he was the chairman of the Standing Committee of the Verkhovna Rada of the Autonomous Republic of Crimea on issues of local self-government and state system.

From October 1996 to February 1997, he was the head of the Chistopil village council of the Leninsky district.

On 13 February 1997, Hrytsenko became the Chairman of the Verkhovna Rada of the Autonomous Republic of Crimea.

From May 1998 to January 2001, he was the Chistopil village head of Leninsky district.

From 6 January 2001, Hrytsenko became the head of the Leninsky District State Administration. He was dismissed on 19 July 2005 by President Viktor Yuschenko.

From July 2005 to September 2005, he was assistant to the Chairman of the Verkhovna Rada of the Autonomous Republic of Crimea.

From September 2005 to May 2006, he was the First Deputy Chairman of the Council of Ministers of the Autonomous Republic of Crimea.

On 12 May 2006, he became the hairman of the Verkhovna Rada of the Autonomous Republic of Crimea for the second time.

In 2007, he graduated from the Kharkiv Regional Institute of Public Administration of the National Academy of Public Administration under the President of Ukraine, majoring in "public administration", and received a master's degree in public administration. He became an honored employee of local self-government in the Autonomous Republic of Crimea.

He left office on 17 March 2010.

On 18 March, Hrystenko became the 11th Governor of Kherson Oblast. He was replaced by Mykola Kostyak on 18 June.

== Corruption scandal ==
In 2008, Hrytsenko was charged with corruption. The Ministry of Internal Affairs of Ukraine opened a case of administrative liability against him after the speaker of the Crimean council refused to disclose where he got the funds to pay off the loan for the purchase of a car. As the representatives of the Ministry of Internal Affairs reported, the official refused to receive a report on the violation and even beat the witness. Hrytsenko himself called the incident a provocation by the Ministry of Internal Affairs and stated that he did not beat anyone.

In August 2009, a split occurred in the Crimean branch of the Party of Regions: one of its leaders, Vasyl Kiselov, accused the Crimean leadership of corruption and left the party in September. Following him, the leaders of the Russian Community of Crimea (RGC) announced their withdrawal from the Party of Regions. In the same month, demonstrations were held in Crimea on the resignation of Hrytsenko.

On 24 January 2011, Hrytsenko had been arrested. On January 27, the court detained Hrytsenko for 2 months. Four criminal cases were initiated against Hrytsenko, but one of them was closed. The criminal case against the former Crimean Speaker Hrytsenko will be conducted by the Zaporizhzhya Communarsky District Court. A. Hrytsenko is accused of abuse of power. The decision on the jurisdiction of the case in the Komunar District Court was made by the Appellate Court of the Zaporizhzhia Region. He was arrested on charges of abuse of power or official authority. Hrytsenko was suspected of illegally seizing the land of the Azovsky military state farm with an area of 4.8 thousand hectares during his leadership of the Leninsky District State Administration. On this fact, he was found guilty. The Crimean prosecutor's office estimated the damage at UAH 23 million. He spent a year and two months in jail, after which he was released.

After the referendum on the status of Crimea on 16 March 2014, Hrytsenko became a member of the A Just Russia party. He went to the elections on 14 September 2014 to the State Council of the Republic of Crimea under the second number from A Just Russia party. On 26 August 2014, he was withdrawn from the elections due to an outstanding criminal record. On 10 September, he left the party.

By the decision of the Court of Appeal of the Zaporozhia Oblast of 26 October 2015, the verdict of the Kommunarsky district court of Zaporizhzhia of 2 March 2012 against Hrytsenko as canceled the criminal case was terminated due to the absence of corpus delicti in his actions.
