= Mykola Bahrov =

Soviet-Ukrainian politician

- Микола Багров
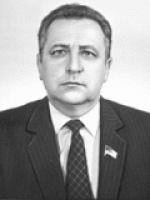
- Bahrov in 1990

Chairman of the Supreme Council of Crimea
- In office 22 March 1991 – 10 May 1994
- Succeeded by: Sergei Tsekov

First Secretary of Crimea Regional Committee of the Communist Party of Ukraine
- In office 25 September 1989 – 10 April 1991
- Preceded by: Andriy Hirenko
- Succeeded by: Leonid Hrach

People's Deputy of Ukraine

1st convocation
- In office 15 May 1990 – 10 May 1994
- Constituency: Communist Party of Ukraine, 255th Nyzhnohirskyi electoral district (Note: Located in Crimean Oblast)

Personal details
- Born: 26 October 1937 Novotroitske, Soviet Union (now Ukraine)
- Died: 21 April 2015 (aged 77) Simferopol, Crimea

Mykola Vasylyovych Bahrov (Ukrainian: Микола Васильович Багров; 26 October 1937 – 21 April 2015) was a Soviet and Ukrainian politician. He was a chairman of the Verkhovna Rada of Crimea in 1990–1994 and Governor of Crimea Oblast 1989–1991.

== Biography ==
Bahrov was born to a Russian family in the town of Novotroitske, Kherson Oblast on 26 October 1937.

In 1959, he graduated with honors from the Frunze Crimean Pedagogical Institute, Faculty of Natural Sciences and Geography, specializing in geography and biology. In 1959-1961, he worked as a geography teacher at the Bagherov Secondary School in the Primorsky District of the Crimean region. Since 1961, he has been working as a geological engineer at the Institute of Mineral Resources of the Crimean National Academy of Sciences in Simferopol.

In 1963-1966 he studied at his native institute in graduate school at the Department of Economic Geography. In 1967, he defended his PhD thesis at Moscow State University on "Formation and Development of Interdistrict Transport and Economic Relations of the Territorial Production Complex (on the Example of the Southern Economic Region)". He worked at the Institute as an assistant, senior lecturer, and acting associate professor. In 1994-1999, he was Vice-Rector for Prospective Development, Head of the Department of Economic and Social Geography, Vice-Rector for Research, and since 1999, Rector of Frunze Simferopol State University. In the same year, on his initiative, the university was awarded the title of national university and renamed the Vernadsky Tauride National University.

In 2001, at the Taras Shevchenko National University of Kyiv, he defended his doctoral dissertation on "Regional Geopolitics (on the Example of Crimea)". In the same year, he managed to obtain autonomous rights for his own institution. In 2001, M.V. Bagrov headed the Council of the Crimean Scientific Center of the National Academy of Sciences of Ukraine and the Ministry of Education of Ukraine.

Academician of the International Academy of Informatization (1995), the Academy of Engineering Sciences of Ukraine (1996), the Crimean Academy of Sciences, and the Academy of Sciences of the Higher School of Ukraine since 2001. Member of the National Committee of Geographers of Ukraine, Academic Council of the Ukrainian Geographical Society. He chaired the Council of Rectors of Higher Education Institutions of Crimea. He was the head of the Small Academy of Sciences for schoolchildren "Seeker".

On November 12, 2014, Mykola Bahrov was dismissed by the Ministry of Education and Science of Ukraine from the post of Rector of the Vernadsky Taurida National University due to his cooperation with the Russian occupation of Crimea.

He died in 2015, aged 77.

== See also ==
- 1994 Crimean presidential election

== Notes ==
Preceded by Andrei Girenko (Andriy Hirenko)	1st Secretary of Crimean Oblast (ASSR) Committee; 1989–1991	Succeeded by Leonid Grach (Leonid Hrach)
Preceded by post created	Chairman of the Supreme Council of Crimea; 1991–1994	Succeeded by Sergei Tsekov
Preceded by ?	Rector of the Tavrida National V.I. Vernadsky University; 1999–2014	Succeeded by reorganized
Preceded by post created	President of the Crimean Federal University; 2015	Succeeded by Sergei Donich
