= Yuri Gaven =

Latvian revolutionary and Soviet politician (1884–1936)

- Юрий Гавен
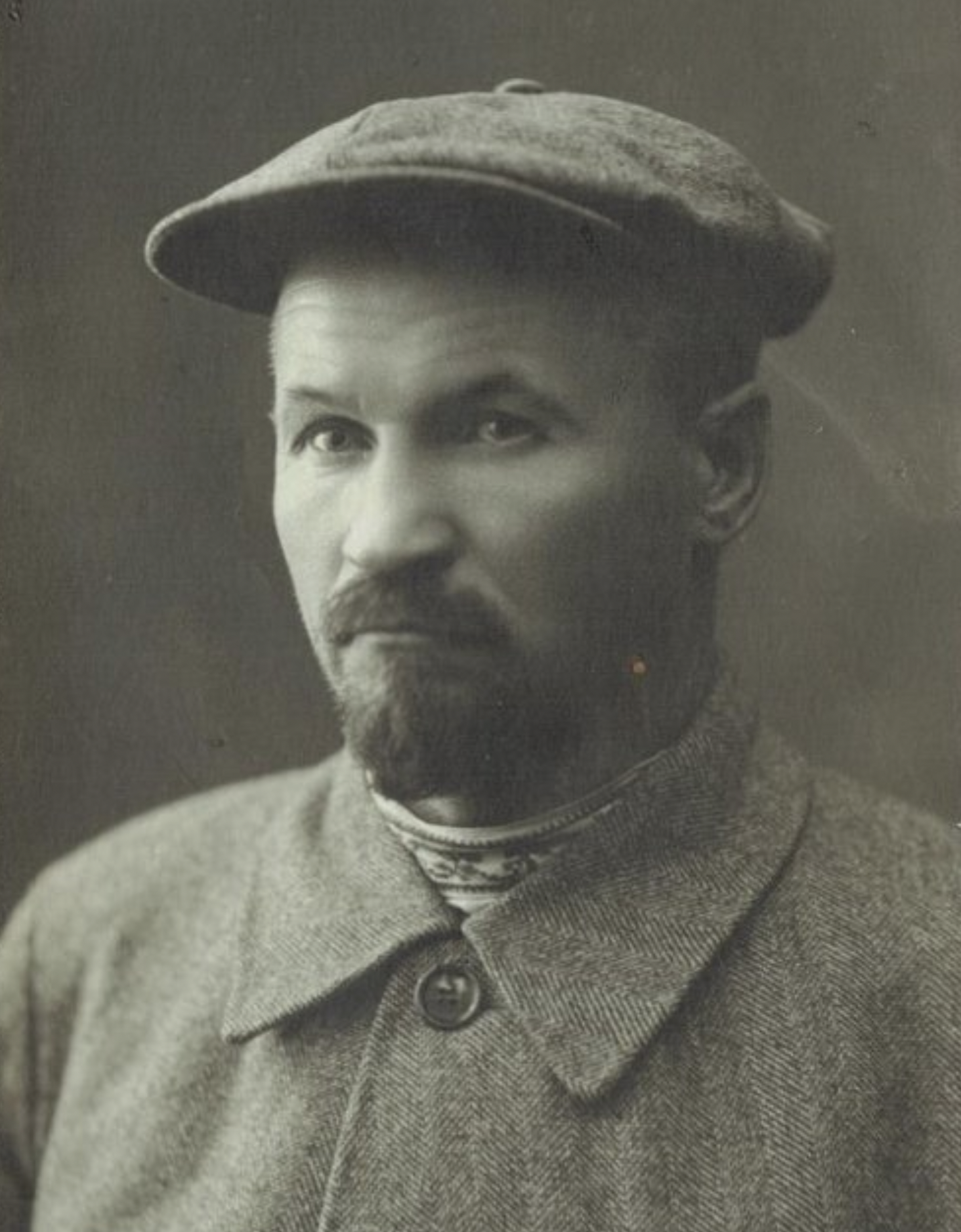

Chairman of the Central Executive Committee (Crimean ASSR)
- In office 7 November 1921 – August 1924
- Preceded by: Position established
- Succeeded by: Veli İbraimov

Personal details
- Born: Jānis Daumanis; 18 March 1884 Bikern (Riga), Livland Governorate, Russian Empire (now Latvia)
- Died: 4 October 1936 (aged 52) Soviet Union
- Party: RSDLP (1901–1936); SDLK (1906–1936)
- Spouse: Armenui Ovvyan
- Education: Baltic Teacher Seminary

Yuri Petrovich Gaven (Russian: Ю́рий Петро́вич Гаве́н; Latvian: Juris Gavēnis; 18 March 1884 – 4 October 1936), born Jānis Daumanis (Russian: Ян Эрнестович Дауман), was a Latvian revolutionary and Soviet politician and Chekist. He was a key figure in the defeat of the Crimean People's Republic and the establishment of the short-lived Taurida Soviet Socialist Republic and an active participant in the Red Terror in Crimea. Executed during the Stalinist purges in 1936, he was rehabilitated in 1958.

== Early years ==
Born as Jānis Daumanis to a Latvian peasant family on 18 March 1884 in the hamlet of Bikern near Riga, he attended the Biķernieki Parish school and the nautical school in Mangaļi, now a district of Riga. On May 5, 1899, 15-year-old Jan took part in a labor demonstration in which five other demonstrators were shot and killed by police and troops.

In 1901, after the death of his older brother, a sailor, the year before he left Mangelskaya nautical school and entered the Baltic Teachers' Seminary in Kuldiga. After being expelled from the seminary in December 1902 for revolutionary propaganda, he passed the national teacher exams as an external student, and worked at a volost school in Madona. He left the school in 1904 due to revolutionary activity.

== Revolutionary activities during Tsarist rule ==
In 1902 Gaven joined what later became the Latvian Social Democratic Labour Party. He worked in Kuldiga in the Governorate of Livonia under the cadre name "Vanya". In 1904, fleeing arrest, he moved to Riga, where he was a propagandist and Secretary of the Riga party organization and organized an underground circle at Feitl's factory. He adopted the pseudonym "Atskabarga" and participated in the manufacture of bombs in an underground workshop.

During the 1905 Revolution, he was a leader of militant formations of peasants in Livland Governorate and organized strikes in Riga and the surrounding district. On 18 January he was wounded during the Cossacks' dispersal of a demonstration at the funeral of killed workers. In July, after another rally, he was arrested in Riga, but later released under the October amnesty. He went underground and began using the name and documents of public school inspector Yuri Petrovich Gaven. In 1906 he became a member of the Central Committee of the Latvian SDLP and also served as head of the Madona Revolutionary Committee.

In 1906-1908 he worked in Riga, Mitau, and Libau under the names "Donner" and "Perkon". He was a delegate to the Third Congress of the Latvian SDLP in July 1906, which entered the Russian Social Democratic Labour Party as a territorial organisation, renaming itself the Social-Democracy of the Latvian Territory ("SDLC"). Gaven was a delegate to and secretary of the Second Congress of the SDLC and participated in the London Congress of the Russian Social Democratic Labour Party in 1907.

Gaven was arrested a second time in Libau in November 1907. He was tortured, and ultimately escaped. He was arrested again in Riga on 21 February 1908 and 7 March 1909. He was convicted under Part 1 of Article 102 of the Criminal Code for belonging to the SDLC and sentenced to six years of hard labor by the Provisional Military Court in Riga in the Case of the Central Committee of the SDLC ("trial of the 44"). He served his sentence until 1911 in the Riga Central katorga, and from 1911 to 1914 in the Vologda Central katorga before being administratively exiled to the village of Chandobetsky, Pinchug volost, Yeniseysk Governorate.

In 1915, after the outbreak of World War I, he was transferred to the city of Minusinsk, Krasnoyarsk Krai (at that time part of Yeniseysk Governorate), then to Krasnoyarsk. He established contacts with local Bolsheviks and on 9 January 1916 organized a strike of printers. He was arrested and sent to Krasnoyarsk prison, and released on 14 March. Soon he was arrested again and deported to the village of Ermakovskoye, then moved back to Minusinsk for treatment.

== Revolution and Civil War ==
The February Revolution found him in Minusinsk. After being released from prison he was elected chair of the Minusinsk Committee of the RSDLP(b) and the Council of Workers' Deputies (Minusinsk Commune) on 3 March 1917 and became the editor of the newspaper Tovarishch. One of the organizers and leaders of the Congress of Soviets of Central Siberia, he was also a member of the Committee for Struggle Against Counterrevolution during the Kornilov affair and organizer of the workers' militia and trade unions. In September he was elected as a delegate to the Democratic Conference in Petrograd. With the mandate of the Central Committee of the RSDLP(b) at the end of September 1917 he was sent to Sevastopol.

Gaven spent 11 days in Simferopol waiting to be allowed in Sevastopol and speaking at rallies. From 6–10 November, he was one of the leaders of the First All-Black Sea Fleet Congress in Sevastopol, which adopted the Bolshevik resolution he wrote on power and sending detachments of sailors and ships to fight Alexey Kaledin. On 20 November 1917 Gaven was a delegate of the Governorate Congress of Soviets in Simferopol and the Bolshevik regional conference on 23–24 November 1917, at which he was elected a member of the bureau of the provincial committee of the RSDLP(b).

On the night of 15–16 December 1917 he was one of the leaders of an uprising of sailors which established the Sevastopol Military Revolutionary Committee or revkom (renamed the Tauride Provincial Military Revolutionary Committee on 28 December 1917). Gaven was in charge of the arrests, tortures and mass shootings that accompanied the uprising.

On 18 December he was elected to lead the Presidium of Soviet of soldiers and workers deputies; he also headed the city's Bolshevik committee and was a chief editor of the newspaper "Tavricheskaya Pravda" (Taurida's Truth). Gaven was one of the main organizers and leaders of the congresses of revolutionary committees and Soviets of the Tauride province on 28–30 January and 7–10 March 1918 and was elected as a member of the provincial Central Executive Committee.

Gaven was a delegate to the Second All-Black Sea Fleet Congress on 16–19 February 1918 and the author of its resolution to support the Council of People's Commissars. On 20 March 1918, he was elected chairman of the Committee for the Defense of the Revolution, then transformed into the Supreme Military Revolutionary Headquarters of the Taurida Soviet Socialist Republic, and on March 26 into the People's Commissariat for Naval Affairs of the Taurida SSR. He led the unsuccessful defense of Crimea from the Ukrainian People's Republic troops and German invaders, and organized the evacuation to Novorossiysk. In May–June, he was a member of the revolutionary headquarters of the Kuban-Black Sea Soviet Republic. In July Gaven was summoned to Moscow, where he had to answer questions about the reasons for the defeat. He suffered shell shock and was ill for 10 months.

In March 1919 he served in the Red Army of the Southern Front. After the liberation of Crimea in April–June 1919 he was Chairman of the Crimean Regional Committee of the Russian Communist Party (Bolsheviks) and at the same time Commissar of Internal Affairs and member of the Presidium of the Crimean Council of People's Commissars. In June he became Chairman of the Defense Council. After the evacuation on July 19, he was appointed a member of the Liquidation Commission for Crimean Affairs. A new exacerbation of his shell shock again put Gaven in the hospital.

As the Red Army continued fighting to regain Crimea Gaven was a member of the Crimean Revolutionary Committee from February–June 1920, as well as secretary of the Crimean Regional Committee of the RCP(b) in Melitopol, authorized representative for communications with the Crimean underground, then head of the Crimean subdivision of the foreign department of the Central Committee of the Communist Party(b) of Ukraine.

As of November 16, 1920 he became deputy chair, serving under Bela Kun, of the Crimean Revolutionary Committee and a participant in the "red terror" that followed the evacuation of the White Army from Crimea. According to a member of the RCP(b), S.V. Konstansov, who spoke out against terror, Gaven admitted in a conversation with him "that he himself is from the point of view of the unnecessary and even harmful nature of the red terror in Crimea at the present time, but that he is not able to do something in this direction," and also "that the only opportunity to influence the use of terror in Crimea is to travel to Moscow to report," which Konstansov undertook.

== Soviet career ==
Starting in 1924 he lived and worked in Moscow, as a member of the presidium and head of the agricultural section of Gosplan, the USSR State Planning Committee. In 1925 he was admitted to the All-Union Society of Old Bolsheviks and, as its representative, was named to the Central Committee of the Moscow Region. In 1931-1933 he was director of the Soviet oil trading company DEROP in Germany (Nuremberg). Due to illness (secondary tuberculosis of the ankle joints and thrombophlembitis), he gradually withdrew from active work and retired in 1933.

== Purge, execution and rehabilitation ==
In 1932 he was allegedly a member of the Bloc of Soviet Oppositions, the political alliance created by left and right opponents of Joseph Stalin within the USSR and Leon Trotsky by the end of 1932. The confessions of defendants in the First Moscow Trial in August 1936 depicted Gaven as one of the oppositionists who communicated with Trotsky.

Gaven was not, however, named as a defendant or called as a witness; instead he was arrested on 4 April 1936 on charges of “counterrevolutionary” activities. He was too ill to appear at his trial on 3 October, at which the Military Collegium of the Supreme Court of the Soviet Union sentenced him to death on charges of participation in a counter-revolutionary Trotskyist organization. He was taken from his sickbed outside on a stretcher and shot on 4 October 1936.

He was rehabilitated in 1958.

== Writings ==
- In memory of those who fell in the revolution 1905-1907.-Moscow, 1933
- January events in Riga (published in 1965 in the collection “The Path Traveled” - Riga)

== Family ==
His elder brother Ekab (Jēkabs) was a sailor who, after graduating from the Mangelsk Naval School, became a navigator and captain. Ekab was active in the revolutionary movement, contacting Latvian emigrants, illegally delivering revolutionary literature to Riga, and taking part in the Riga riots of 1899. He died in the wreck of the steamer Jupiter off the coast of Denmark in 1900.

Gaven's younger brother Ans (Ansis) had been a member of the revolutionary circle at the Feitl factory since 1903. After graduating from the Pskov Land Surveying School. he participated in the 1905 Revolution, edited the underground student newspaper “Jaunības balss”. Then he worked as a land surveyor in Pskov. After the October Revolution of 1917, he joined the Red Army, was a division commissar under Jānis Fabriciuss, a member of the Revolutionary Military Council of the Latvian Red Army, and commander of the Courland Group of Forces, which captured Riga and Mitava in January 1919. In the summer of 1920, while commanding the 10th division of the 16th Red Army, he died during the assault on Brest-Litovsk.

His brother Heinrich (Heinrihs) studied at the Stieglitz Art School in St. Petersburg. In 1912 he drowned during a vacation in Pskov.

His sister Germina (Hermīne) graduated from Lesgaft Courses in St. Petersburg.

His wife Armenui Sumbatovna Hovvyan, an Armenian from Nagorno-Karabakh, attended courses in Odessa. In 1911 she began work as a teacher at Elena Stasova's Tiflis school, and participated in her underground group, joining the RSDLP in 1910. After the destruction of the group in 1912, she was exiled to Siberia. In 1916 she moved to Minusinsk, where she became close to Gaven and became his faithful comrade and wife.

After the February Revolution of 1917, she was elected Secretary of the Minusinsk Council of Workers' Deputies. At the end of the year, following Gaven, she moved to Crimea and worked as his assistant. In 1921 she became Secretary of the bureau of the Armenian section of the Crimean regional committee of the RCP(b) and a member of the editorial board of the newspaper “Bell of the Commune”.

Beginning in 1923, she led the International Red Aid in Crimea and the “Friends of Children” society, and participated in the resettlement of Armenians repatriated from Turkey. In 1925 she was admitted to the All-Union Society of Old Bolsheviks on the recommendation of Elena Stasova and Sergo Ordzhonikidze.

She worked as the head of the Children's Town named after the Third International in Moscow and sponsored the children's colony for street children in the Conception Monastery, where she lived with the children. She also studied at the Timiryazev Agricultural Academy.
