= Leonid Hrach =

Ukrainian-Russian politician (1948–2025)

- Леонiд Грач
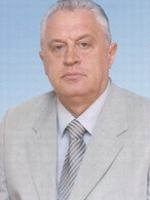
- Hrach in 2007

Chairman of the Supreme Council of Crimea
- In office 14 May 1998 – 29 April 2002
- Preceded by: Anatoliy Hrytsenko
- Succeeded by: Boris Deich

People's Deputy of Ukraine

4th convocation
- In office 14 May 2002 – 25 May 2006
- Constituency: Communist Party of Ukraine, 11th on party list

5th convocation
- In office 25 May 2006 – 23 November 2007
- Constituency: Communist Party of Ukraine, 19th on party list

6th convocation
- In office 23 November 2007 – 12 December 2012
- Constituency: Communist Party of Ukraine, 21st on party list

Personal details
- Born: 1 January 1948 Brodetske village, Vinnytsia Oblast, Ukrainian SSR, USSR
- Died: 17 October 2025 (aged 77)

Leonid Ivanovych Hrach (Ukrainian: Леонiд Iванович Грач), also as Leonid Ivanovich Grach (Russian: Леони́д Ива́нович Гра́ч), (1 January 1948 – 17 October 2025) was a Soviet, Ukrainian and Russian politician.

== Life and career ==
Hrach was born in the town of Brodetske, Vinnytsia Oblast on 1 January 1948.

He was a chairman of the Verkhovna Rada of Crimea in 1998–2002 and the 1st secretary of the Crimean republican committee of CPU in 1991. Hrach stayed the leader of communists in Crimea until 2010 when he was officially excluded from communists ranks by leadership of the Communist Party of Ukraine.

After the annexation of Crimea by the Russian Federation in 2014, Hrach joined the Russian political party Communists of Russia along with the Crimean republican committee of the Communist Marxist–Leninist Party of Ukraine.

Hrach died on 17 October 2025, at the age of 77.

== See also ==
- 1994 Crimean presidential election

== Notes ==
Preceded by Nikolai Bagrov (Mykola Bahrov)	1st Secretary of Crimean ASSR of Committee; 1991	Succeeded by post disbanded
Preceded by Anatoliy Hrytsenko	Chairman of the Supreme Council of Crimea; 1998–2002	Succeeded by Boris Deich
Preceded by Oleksandr Yakovenko	Leader of the Communist Party of Workers and Peasants; 2011–2013	Succeeded by Oleksandr Savenko
Preceded by post created	Leader of the Communist Marxist-Leninist Party of Ukraine; 2013–2014	Succeeded by post liquidated
