= Alushta Municipality =

Municipality in Crimea

Alushta City Municipality Алуштинська міська рада
- Municipality
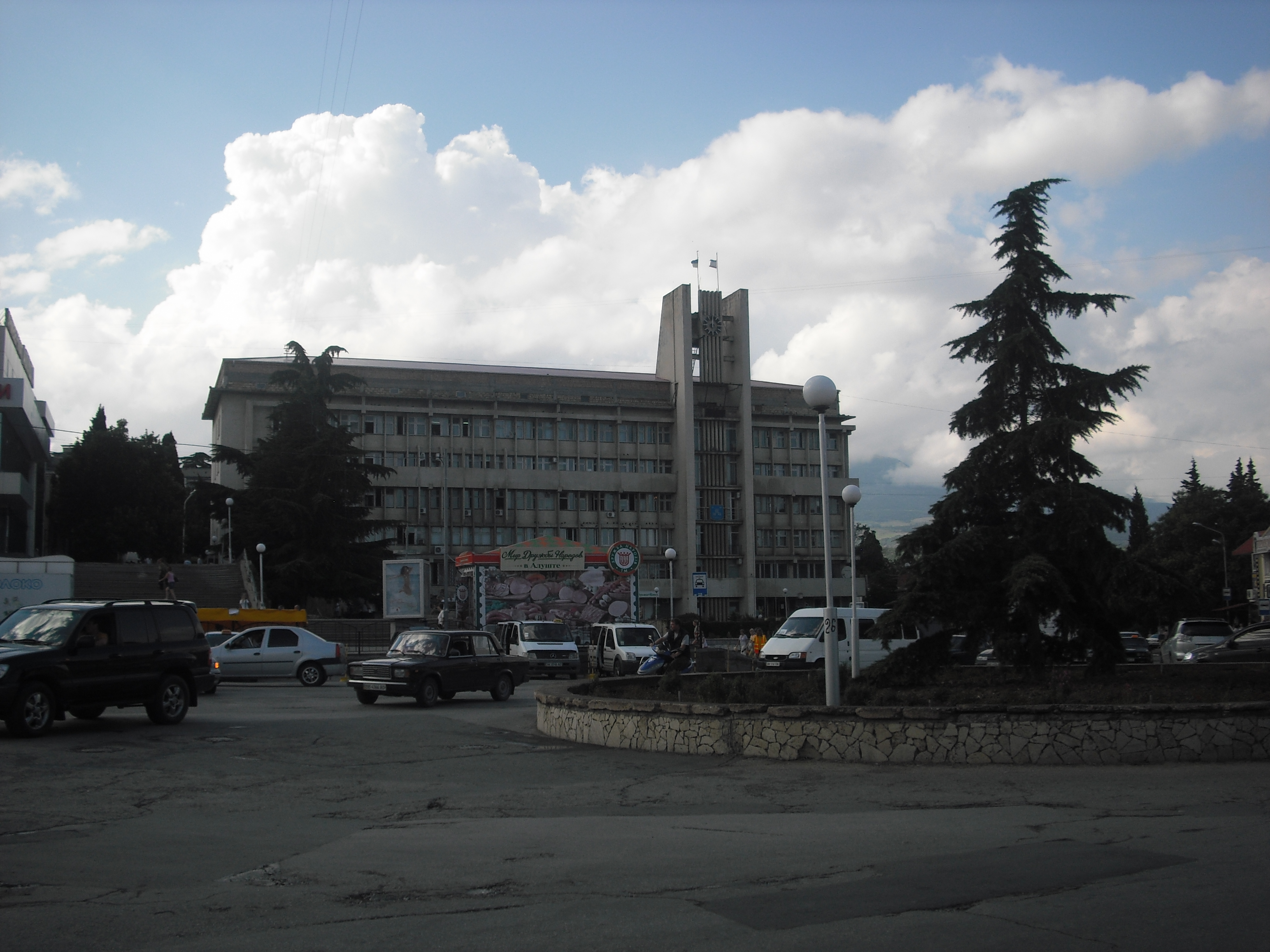
- Alushta city council
- Location of Alushta municipality in Crimea
- Coordinates: 44°40′2″N 34°23′52″E
- Republic: Crimea
- Capital: Alushta
- Subdivisions: List: 1 city municipalities; 1 town municipalities; 5 rural municipalities; -----: Total settlements: 1 cities; 1 urban-type settlements; 24 villages; settlements

Area
  - Total: 600 km^{2} (230 sq mi)

Population (2014)
  - Total: 52,318
  - Density: 87/km^{2} (230/sq mi)
- Time zone: UTC+3 (MSK)
- Area code: 380-6560-
- Website: alushta.rk.gov.ru

Alushta City Municipality (Ukrainian: Алуштинська міська рада, Russian: Алуштинский горсовет, Crimean Tatar: Aluşta şeer şurası), officially "the territory governed by the Alushta city council", also known as Greater Alushta, is one of the 25 regions of the Autonomous Republic of Crimea, a territory recognized by a majority of countries as part of Ukraine but incorporated by Russia as the Republic of Crimea. Population: 52,318 (2014 Census).

It is a resort region, located at the southern shore of Crimea - one of the most famous recreational territories of the former Soviet Union.

== Administrative and municipal status ==
Within the framework of administrative divisions of Russia, Alushta is, together with a number of urban and rural localities, incorporated separately as the town of republican significance of Alushta—an administrative unit with the status equal to that of the districts. As a municipal division, the town of republican significance of Alushta is incorporated as Alushta Urban Okrug.

Within the framework of administrative divisions of Ukraine, Alushta is incorporated as the town of republican significance of Alushta. Ukraine does not have municipal divisions.

Besides the city of Alushta the region includes the town of Partenit and 24 villages which are organized into 6 communities.

Former Crimean Tatar names which were officially changed in 1945-49 and are now used only by the Crimean Tatar community are mentioned in brackets.

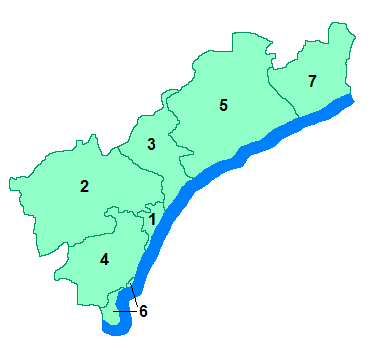

- 1 - the city of Alushta
- 2 - Izobilne village community
  - Izobilne (Körbekül)
  - Verkhnya Kutuzovka (Yuqarı Şuma)
  - Nyzhnya Kutuzovka (Aşağı Şuma)
  - Rozovyi
- 3 - Luchyste village community
  - Luchyste (Demirci)
  - Lavanda
  - Semidvorye (Yedi Ev)
- 4 - Malyi Mayak village community
  - Malyi Mayak (Büyük Lambat)
  - Vynohradnyi (Qastel)
  - Zaprudne (Degirmenköy)
  - Kyparysne (Küçük Lambat)
  - Lavrove (Kürkület)
  - Lazurne
  - Nyzhnye Zaprudne (Aşağı Degirmenköy)
  - Pushkine (Küçükköy)
  - Utyos (Qarasan)
- 5 - Malorichenske village community
  - Malorichenske (Küçük Özen)
  - Heneralske (Ulu Özen)
  - Rybache (Tuvaq)
  - Sonyachnohirske (Quru Özen)
- 6 - Partenit town community
  - Partenit
  - Bondarenkove (Qarabağ)
  - Chayka
- 7 - Pryvitne village community
  - Pryvitne (Üsküt)
  - Zelenohirya (Arpat)

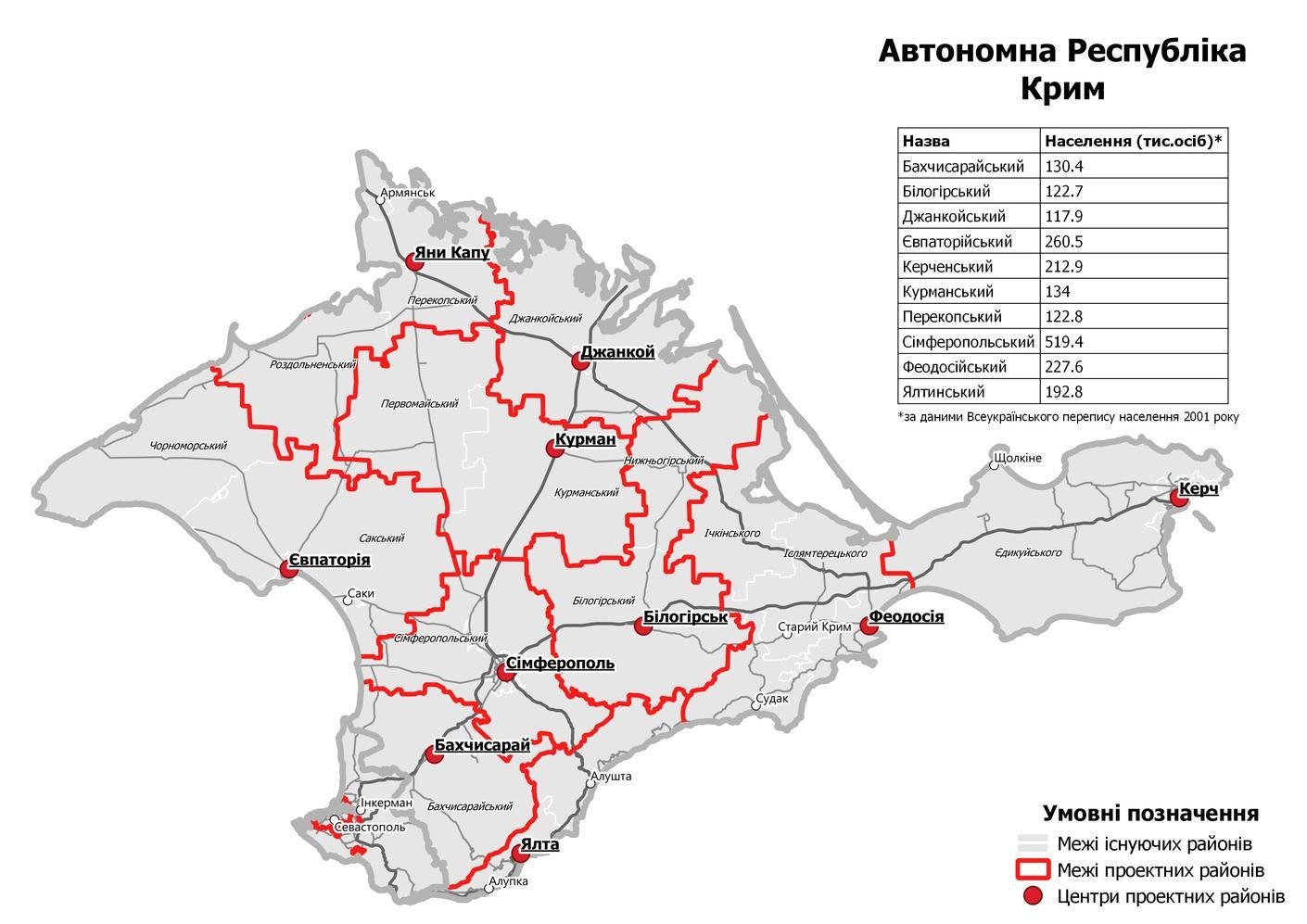
In July 2020, the Verkhovna Rada approved an administrative reform in Crimea

== 2020 Ukrainian Administrative Reform ==
In July 2020, Ukraine conducted an administrative reform throughout its de jure territory. This included Crimea, which was at the time occupied by Russia, and is still ongoing as of October 2023. Crimea was reorganized from 14 raions and 11 municipalities into 10 raions, with municipalities abolished altogether.

Alushta Municipality was abolished, and its territories to become a part of Yalta Raion, but this has not yet been implemented due to the ongoing Russian occupation.

== Sister cities ==
The following cities are twinned with Alushta:

- Äänekoski, Central Finland
- Santa Cruz, California, United States
- Jūrmala, Latvia
- Dzierżoniów, Poland
