= Lazurne, Crimea =

Lazurne
- Village
- Location within Ukraine Location within Crimea
- Coordinates: 44°38′08″N 34°23′24″E
- Country: Ukraine
- Province: Autonomous Republic of Crimea
- District: Yalta Raion
- Municipality: Alushta Municipality
- Elevation: 126 m (413 ft)

Population (2014)
  - Total: 148
- Time zone: UTC+4 (MSK)
- ^{1} Autonomous Republic of Crimea (de jure) or Republic of Crimea (de facto), depending on jurisdiction.

Lazurne (Russian: Лазурное; Ukrainian: Лазурне; Crimean Tatar: Lazurnoye) is a village in Alushta Municipality, Crimea. Population: 148 (2014 Census).

== Demographics ==
According to the 2001 census, 151 people lived in the village. The linguistic composition of the village population was as follows:

Language	Percentage
Russian	92.72 %
Ukrainian	6.62 %
Armenian	0.66 %
