= Oqqoʻrgʻon District =

Coordinates: 40.8753°N 69.0463°E

Oqqoʻrgʻon
- District
- Oqqoʻrgʻon tumani
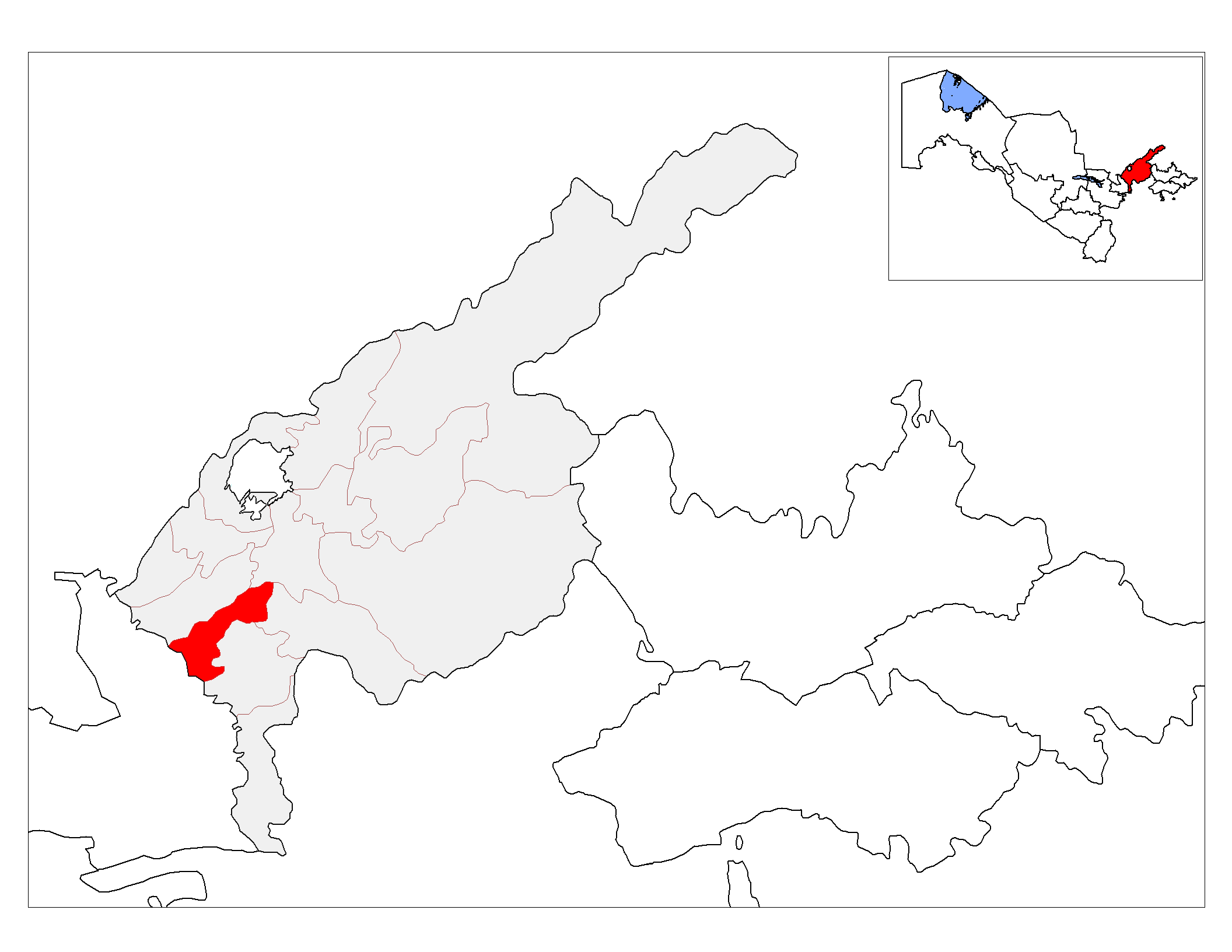
- Country: Uzbekistan
- Region: Tashkent Region
- Capital: Oqqoʻrgʻon
- Established: 1935

Area
  - Total: 400 km^{2} (150 sq mi)

Population
  - Total: 106,400
  - Density: 270/km^{2} (690/sq mi)
- Time zone: UTC+5 (UZT)

Oqqoʻrgʻon (Uzbek: Oqqoʻrgʻon tumani) is a district of Tashkent Region in Uzbekistan. The capital lies at the city Oqqoʻrgʻon. It has an area of 400 km^{2} (150 sq mi) and its population is 130,100 (2021 est.).

== Settlements ==
The district consists of one city (Oqqoʻrgʻon), 2 urban-type settlements (Olimkent, Hamzaobod) and 10 rural communities (Oytamgʻali, Oqqoʻrgʻon, Achchi, Doʻstlik, Zarbdor, Shoxruxiya, Erkinlik, Zafar, Toshtoʻgʻon, Eltamgʻali).

== Climate ==
When arctic air masses come in contact with the north-western part and the temperature drops in winter. The average temperature of January is -3.7 °C, the lowest temperature was -33 °, July is 26.5 °C, and the highest temperature was 42 °.

== Population ==
The population of is mainly ethnic Uzbek (80.9%), Kazakh (8.3%), Russian (2.8%), Tatar (1.09%), Tajik (1.6%) Korean (1.4%), Ukrainians, Germans, Kyrgyz, Uygur, Azar-Bayjon, Belarus, Turkmen, Jewish and other nationalities (3.1%). The average population density is 270 people per km^{2}.

== Economy ==
There are more than ten enterprises in the district (Large enterprises: Alimkent and Akkurgan cotton processing plants, "Maftuna", "Akkurgan MTP" Joint-Stock Company). Transportation is organized by private companies running 46 bus lines in the district. Industries focus on cotton oil, knitted and crocheted products, food and dairy products. There are 6 construction companies. The district has a complex growing agriculture, consisting of 13 shirkats and 5 privatized farms. Agriculture is the leading branch of the economy, producing grains, vegetables, melons, cereals and feed crops, but there are also grapes and other fruits. When it comes to animals, the regional agriculture is engaged in growing cattle, sheep and goats, poultry and silkworms.
