= Abdul Menbariev =

Soviet Crimean Tatar politician

Abdulcelâl Menbariyev
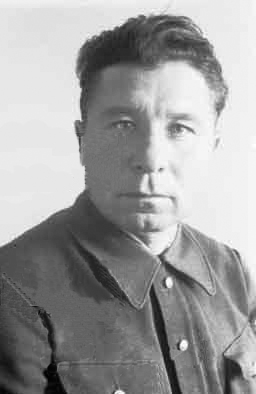

Chairman of the Central Executive Committee of the Crimean ASSR
- In office 7 September 1937 – 21 July 1938
- Preceded by: İlyas Tarhan
- Succeeded by: Position abolished

Chairman of the Supreme Soviet of the Crimean ASSR
- In office 21 July 1938 – 18 May 1944
- Preceded by: Position established
- Succeeded by: Nadezhda Sachyova

Personal details
- Born: 1902 Mambet Acı, Taurida Governorate, Russian Empire (now Lugove, Crimea)
- Died: 1960 (aged 57–58)
- Party: Communist Party of the Soviet Union

Abdulcelâl Hayrulla Meñbariyev (Russian: Абдул Джелаль Хайрулла Менбариев; 1902 – 1960) was a politician who served as the chairman of the Presidium of the Supreme Soviet of the Crimean ASSR from 1937 to 1944.

== Life ==
He was a member of the Communist party since 1927, and a senior member of Crimean ASSR leadership. He was evacuated from the peninsula soon after the German invasion of the Soviet Union, and had his family sent to the Uzbek SSR, but returned on 14 April 1944 after German troops were expelled from Simferopol. However, barely a month later he and Ismail Seyfullaev (Chairman of the Council of People's Commissars of the Crimean ASSR) were summoned to the office of the first secretary of the Crimean Regional Party Committee, where they were told of the resolution ordering the deportation of all Crimean Tatars from Crimea and asked to assist with the deportation by Bogdan Kobulov. After deportation he lived in Andijan, initially working at a school and a factory before receiving a pension and moving to Stalingrad. While residing in the Uzbek SSR other Crimean Tatars repeatedly asked him to join and support their calls for restoration of the Crimean ASSR and right of return, but he categorically refused to assist the Crimean Tatar civil rights movement in any way.

== See also ==
- Seit Tairov
