= Veli İbraimov =

Crimean Tatar revolutionary and Soviet politician (1888–1928)

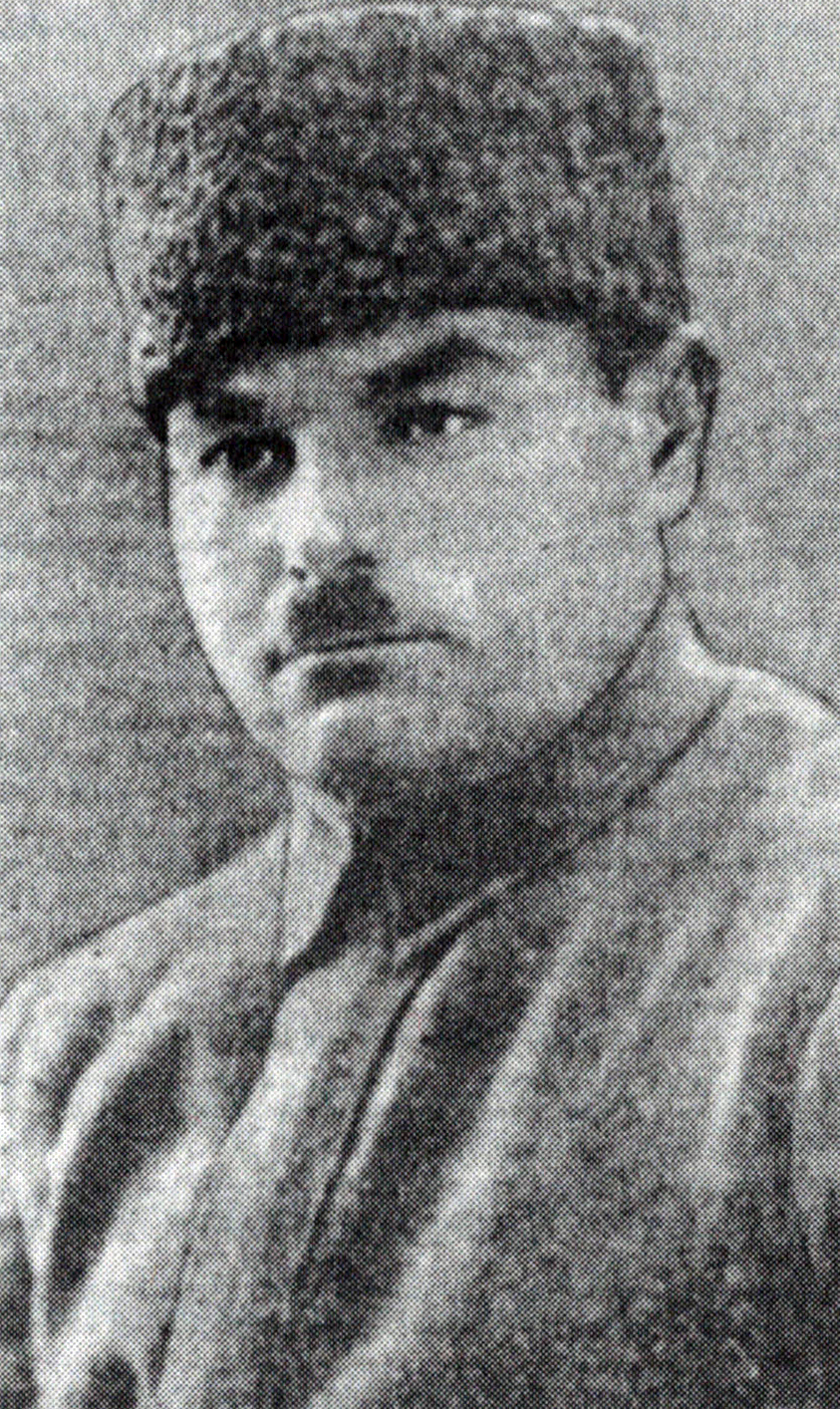

Chairman of the Central Executive Committee of the Crimean ASSR
- In office August 1924 – 28 January 1928
- Preceded by: Yuri Gaven
- Succeeded by: Memet Qubayev

Personal details
- Born: 1888 Bakhchysarai, Taurida Governorate, Russian Empire (now Crimea)
- Died: 9 May 1928 (aged 39–40) Soviet Union
- Party: All-Union Communist Party (Bolshevik) (1918–1928)
- Other political affiliations: Milliy Firqa (1917–1918)
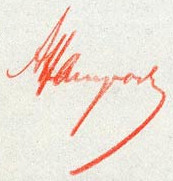
- Signature

Veli İbraimov (Russian: Вели́ Ибраи́мов, romanized: Veli Ibraimov; 1888 – 9 May 1928), also written as Veli Ibrahimov (Russian: Вели Ибраимов, romanized: Veli Ibragimov), was a Crimean Tatar revolutionary and Soviet politician. He served as the second Chairman of the Central Executive Committee of the Crimean Autonomous Soviet Socialist Republic, serving from 1924 to 1928.

Originally a member of Milliy Firqa, and a delegate to the first Qurultay of the Crimean Tatar People, İbraimov joined the Russian Communist Party in 1918, and became a national communist authority within Crimea. An opponent of Jewish autonomy in Crimea, he met his downfall for his acts, which were accused of being exclusively in the interests of the Crimean Tatars, and he was removed from his post and executed in 1928. In 1990, he was rehabilitated by Soviet authorities due to lack of evidence.

== Early life and career ==
Veli İbraimov was born in the city of Bakhchysarai, Crimea, in 1888. His father, Ibraim, was a merchant, while his paternal grandfather (named Memet) was a peasant from the village of Özenbaş (now known as Tymoshenko). At the age of 12, Veli left school to work in a printing house, where he was a loader, cashier, and typesetter. At the age of 14, he began working with his brother in the Terciman newspaper. They were personally tutored by Crimean Tatar political leader Ismail Gasprinsky, who taught them Crimean history, as well as French, Russian, Arabic, and Turkish. At this time, İbraimov first began to establish contacts with the Crimean Tatar nationalist movement, meeting Asan Sabri Ayvazov, Noman Çelebicihan, Reşid Mediyev, Amet Özenbaşlı, and Cafer Seydamet Qırımer.

After partaking in the 1905 Russian Revolution, İbraimov left to live in the Ottoman Empire, living there from 1909 to 1912. He then returned to Russia through the Caucasus, and established a coffeeshop in Simferopol.

Until 1914, İbraimov was a member of Aqmescit, a Crimean Tatar cultural organisation. In 1916, he was president of a Crimean Tatar labour union. In March 1917, he was involved in the first and second All-Crimean Muslim Assemblies, as well as the All-Crimean Muslim Committee. Eight months later, he was a delegate to the first Qurultay of the Crimean Tatar People. He was a member of Milliy Firqa, and led the party's left wing. The next year, however, he joined the Russian Communist Party (Bolshevik), swayed by promises of Crimean Tatar autonomy. During the Russian Civil War, he fought on the North Caucasian Front as a member of the Cheka.

== Early political career ==
In 1921, a massive famine began in Crimea, resulting from war communist policies of Prodrazverstka undertaken the previous year. İbraimov and his supporters called for the recognition of Crimea as a region suffering from famine by the Russian Soviet government, and introduced a motion to do so in December 1920. Despite their protests, however, they were ignored, and export of Crimean food supplies (including seed stocks) only continued to increase. Finally, in the spring of 1921, prominent Bolshevik leader Mirsaid Sultan-Galiev visited Crimea. Sultan-Galiev said that the peninsula was undergoing "A terrible economic crisis ... The food situation is deteriorating day by day. The entire Southern region, populated mainly by the Tatar population, is currently literally starving." Only as a result of his intervention was relief supplied. According to İbraimov's estimates, 110,000 people died during the famine, of whom 76,000 (69%) were Crimean Tatars.

Beginning in November 1921, İbraimov was People's Commissar for Inspection of the Workers and Peasants within the Crimean Autonomous Soviet Socialist Republic.

On 30 January 1922, İbraimov was selected as the leader of a troika (alongside a Cheka representative and an individual with the surname of Buzov) tasked with ensuring the destruction of remaining anti-Soviet guerrillas in Crimea. Local counter-insurgency commissions, established at the troika's behest, were strongly criticised by Crimean Tatar peasants and referred to commonly as "self-judicial commissions" due to their tendency to harass and persecute peasantry rather than actually addressing issues which had caused anti-Soviet sentiment to rise. Despite the actions of the commissions, İbraimov pursued his own strategy, involving liberal use of amnesties and an emphasis on negotiations, to tangible results.

At this time, İbraimov also found his most significant political ally, Amet Hayserov. Hayserov, who had previously fought in the forces of the Crimean People's Republic and the White Army in Crimea before leading anti-Soviet guerrillas in the Crimean Mountains, was granted amnesty in 1921 and became head of a local anti-White commission. Among other members of Hayserov's commission were other former guerrillas who he had fought alongside. Hayserov soon acquired attention from İbraimov, and was appointed his bodyguard and personal secretary shortly thereafter.

== Chairman of the Central Executive Committee ==
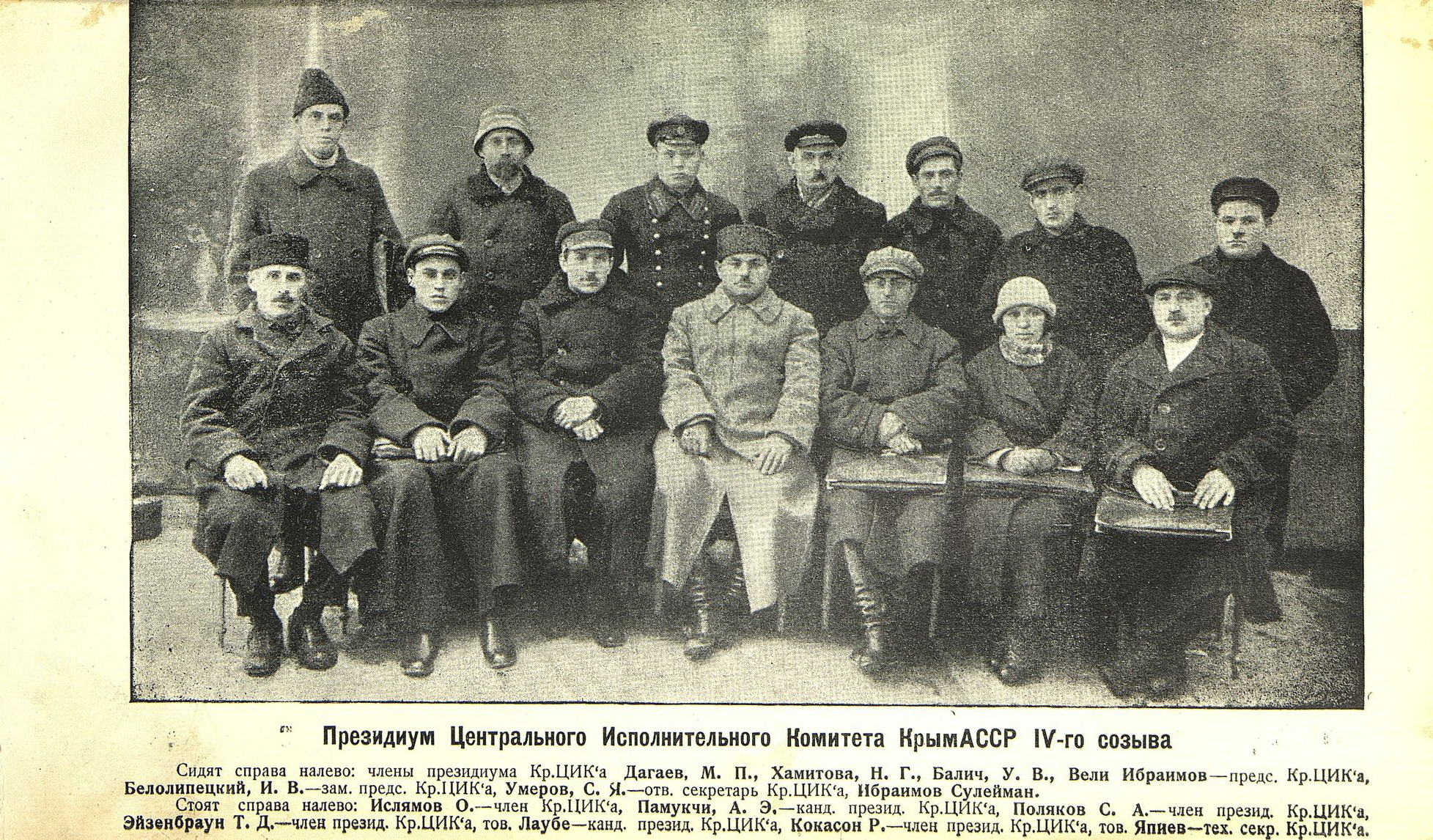
Members of the Central Executive Committee of the Crimean ASSR, 1925. İbraimov is in the centre, seated.

In August 1924, İbraimov was appointed Chairman of the Central Executive Committee of the Crimean ASSR. He quickly established himself as a figure in opposition to the central government of the Soviet Union, publicly standing against efforts to resettle Jews from Ukraine and Belarus as part of a planned Jewish autonomy in Crimea. Alongside Osman Deren-Ayırlı (president of the Council of People's Commissars of the Crimean ASSR), he publicly expressed his opposition to the Jewish autonomy plans, proposing at first to repatriate Crimean Tatars from Romania and Bulgaria. After the refusal of the Entente, İbraimov then proposed to settle the northern Crimean steppe with Crimean Tatars from the overcrowded Southern Coast. At the same time, İbraimov's supporters went to Jewish resettlement centres and agitated against the proposed autonomy plan, claiming it would disrupt inter-ethnic harmony and have negative effects in an area which had only recently begun to recover from the 1921 famine.

On 28 February 1925, the Central Executive Committee and Council of People's Commissars of the Crimean ASSR issued orders prohibiting Jewish resettlement in Crimea. However, the stated orders failed to prevent Soviet resettlement efforts. İbraimov then proceeded to move to resettle internally displaced Crimean Tatars in the north, with around 50% of the resettled Crimean Tatars being from the Crimean Submediterranean forest complex and the Crimean Mountains. The city of Yalta became a key station in these resettlement efforts, and were quickly countered by the Soviet government's allocation of 55,000 ha (5,500,000 a) towards the purpose of Jewish resettlement.

In the spring of 1927, a fact-finding expedition was sent to Crimea by the Central Committee of the All-Union Communist Party. At its head was Ivan Kozlov. In Simferopol, a joint plenum of the Crimean Regional Committee and the regional control commission of the All-Union Communist Party was held. There, Kozlov reported that İbraimov's land management efforts were being done in violation of Soviet law. A resolution by the joint plenum stated, "It is necessary to begin carrying out land management from the start, in order to stimulate land redistribution by the peasantry itself under the leadership of the land authorities." İbraimov voted against the resolution, saying, "As for shortcomings in land management, I believe that the norms in Crimea are correct and scientifically substantiated, but need to be revised only in the interests of Jewish resettlement on the peninsula."

== Downfall and death ==
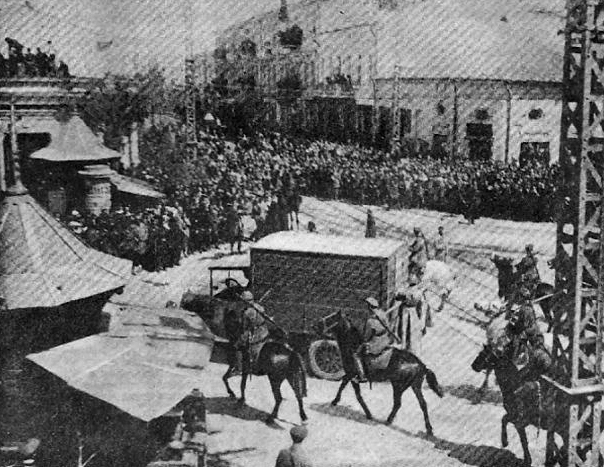
İbraimov being carted away from court after being sentenced to death, 1928

On 12 July 1927, Ibraim Arif Cholak was found murdered, having been strangled to death at Simferopol's landfill. Cholak had previously had a feud with Hayserov dating back to the Russian Civil War, and had served as a key witness at a trial involving Hayserov. A few days prior to his murder, Cholak had been arrested after entering İbraimov's home with a revolver and been disarmed and injured by Hayserov before being apprehended by OGPU agents. Prior to his death, Cholak had been in the hospital of a pre-trial detention facility.

Immediately, İbraimov came under suspicion by Soviet police authorities. Further worsening matters was the inability to confirm his alibi. On 28 January 1928 he was expelled from the Communist Party, and he was arrested in February of the same year. The trial was considered by the Supreme Court of the Russian SFSR and held in Simferopol from 23 to 28 April 1928. İbraimov and 14 other defendants, among them political allies, were charged with terrorism, involvement in organised crime, and embezzlement of public funds.

As a result of the trial, 11 defendants were found guilty and given various sentences. Additionally, one defendant was given a suspended sentence and the remaining three were acquitted. İbraimov and Mustafa Abdulla, who had also partaken in efforts to resettle Crimean Tatars, were both sentenced to death. On 9 May 1928, Abdulla and İbraimov were executed.

Following İbraimov's execution, claims were made by members of the Soviet establishment, among them Vyacheslav Molotov and Stanisław Kosior, that he had been an agent of Milliy Firqa acting in the interests of ethnic Crimean Tatars. As a result, the term Veliibraimovshchina (Russian: велиибраимовщина) began to be used in official circles to refer to national communist elements within the Soviet government. Shortly after his execution, another trial of alleged Milliy Firqa agents was conducted, with 63 defendants. In this case, OGPU found 58 of those tried guilty, with 11 being sentenced to death.

Alternative reasons for İbraimov's execution have been posited by historians. Edem Orazly argued in his 2001 book Operation Crimean Legend that it was an act of revenge by Soviet leader Joseph Stalin for İbraimov's peaceful resolution of a Chechen-Ingush conflict in the North Caucasus during the Russian Civil War, a feat Stalin (himself a native of the Caucasus) could not accomplish. Another theory, proposed by Nariman Ibadullayev, claims that the execution was done out of concern that İbraimov would reveal compromising information about the killings of Grigory Kotovsky and Mishka Yaponchik, both participants in the 1907 Tiflis bank robbery who had died under unclear circumstances.

=== Rehabilitation ===
Amidst the backdrop of glasnost, İbraimov's case came under review by the Soviet authorities. On 3 May 1990, he was rehabilitated by the Prosecutor's office of the Crimean Oblast. On 20 June of the same year, the Supreme Court of the Russian SFSR cancelled İbraimov's sentence, citing a lack of evidence. He was further found innocent by the prosecutor's office of the Odesa Military District in 1993.

== Legacy ==
İbraimov's execution was a watershed moment in the development of Crimean Tatar autonomy within the Soviet Union. After his death, the Soviet line was increasingly followed, with future leaders opposing the more autonomous path followed by İbraimov. His execution was also marked by increased crackdowns on the Crimean Tatar intelligentsia. More broadly, his execution marked the beginning of the end of Korenizatsiia. Though the process continued for some years after his death, few pursued a policy of autonomy to the same extent that he had. It was also a milestone in Soviet history, with İbraimov being the first government official to have been executed by the Soviet government.

After his death, İbraimov became a symbolic figure for Crimean Tatar nationalists. Amidst the German occupation of Crimea during World War II, Crimean Tatar collaborationist newspaper Azat Kırım praised him as a significant figure in what it viewed as a struggle between Jews and Crimean Tatars. In a 24 April 1924 issue, it was written, "The first Chairman of the Executive Committee was Veli Ibrahimov. Making every effort not to allow the fate of his motherland and his people to slip into the hands of the Jews, and fighting against all tricks, threats, and deceptions from Moscow, this son of his nation consequently fell victim to Bolshevism and the Jews."
