= Izobilne, Alushta =

Village in Alushta Municipality, Crimea

Izobilne Ізобільне · Изобильное · Körbekül
- Village
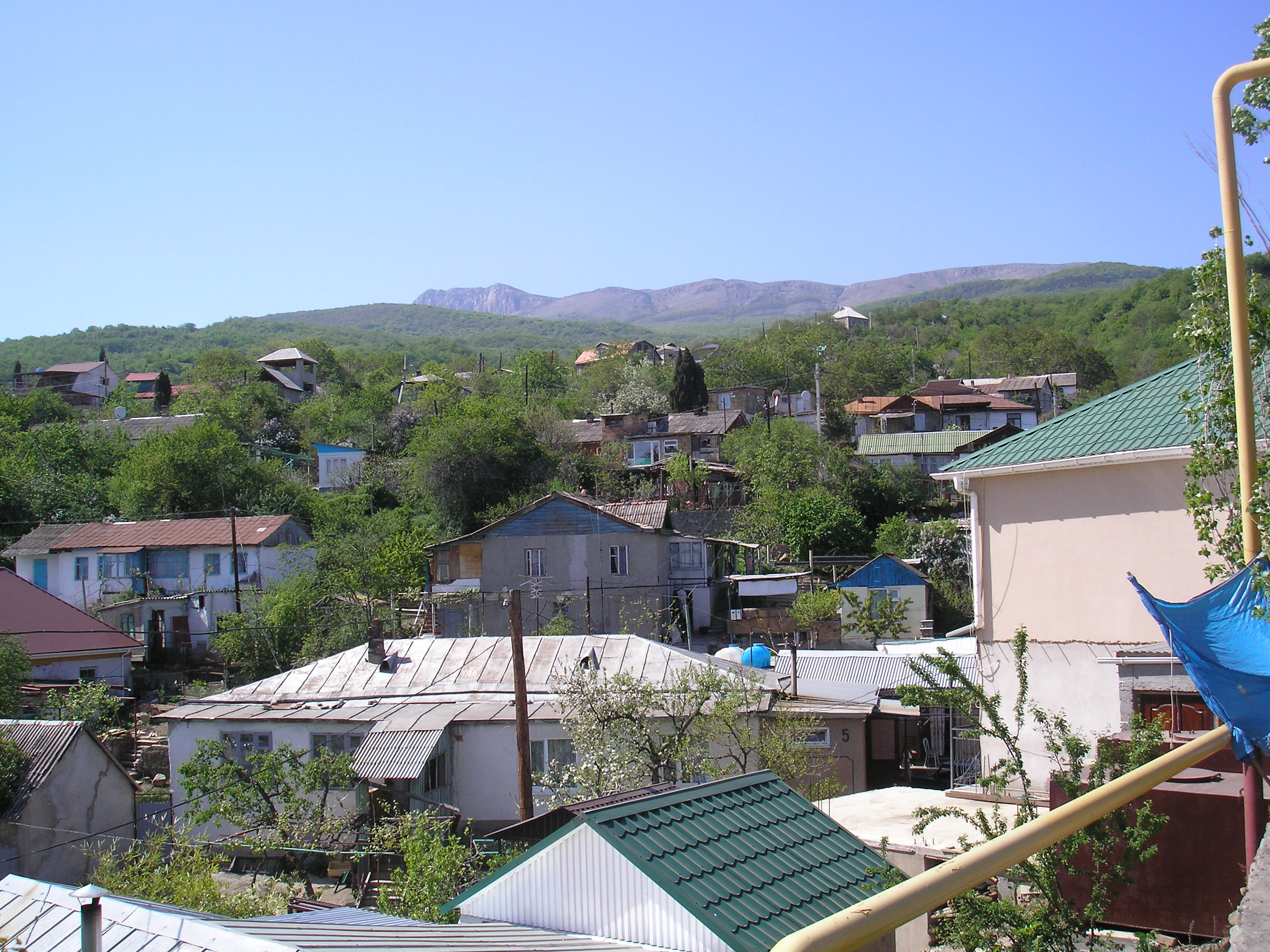

- Location of Izobilne in Crimea Location of Izobilne in Ukraine
- Coordinates: 44°42′06″N 34°21′16″E
- Republic: Crimea
- Municipality: Alushta Municipality
- Established: 15th century

Population (2001)
  - Total: 2,305

Izobilne (Ukrainian: Ізобільне; Russian: Изобильное, romanized: Izobilnoye), known until 1945 by the Crimean Tatar name of Körbekül (Russian and Ukrainian: Корбек, romanized: Korbek), is a village in Alushta Municipality, Crimea, a region internationally recognised as part of Ukraine but occupied by Russia since 2014.

== History ==
Körbekül was established in the late 15th century, and was first occupied by the Red Army in January 1918 during the Russian Civil War. The village was depopulated during the deportation of the Crimean Tatars, and renamed to Izobilne.

Izobilne is home to Körbek Cami, a large mosque. Known for its beauty, the mosque's minaret was destroyed in the early 20th century and subsequently closed following the deportation of the Crimean Tatars. In 1994, amidst the 1992–1994 Crimean crisis, the mosque was rebuilt in 2014 with funding from Turkish businessman Murat Ülker. His grandfather was the final imam of the mosque before being forced abroad during the Great Purge.

== Demographics ==
According to the 2001 Ukrainian census, Izobilne has a population of 2,305. Of this population, 67.68% speaks the Russian language. Crimean Tatar is the second largest language and is spoken by 25.77% of the population. Ukrainian is spoken by 5.34% of the population.

== Notable people ==
- Mustafa Chachi, collective farm manager
