= German Konovalov =

Russian Army officer (1882–1936)

German Ivanovich Konovalov
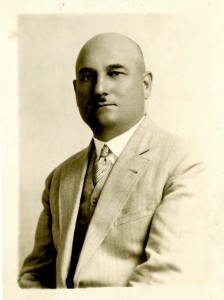
- Native name: Герман Иванович Коновалов
- Born: 12 September 1882; Akkerman, Bessarabia Governorate, Russian Empire
- Died: 30 March 1936 (aged 53) Cluj-Napoca, Kingdom of Romania
- Allegiance: Russian Empire (Ukraine) Ukrainian State (Russia) White Movement
- Branch: Imperial Russian Army; Armed Forces of South Russia
- Service years: 1900–1920
- Rank: Major general
- Commands: Quartermaster General of the Russian Army Staff
- Conflicts: World War I Russian Civil War

German Ivanovich Konovalov (Герман Иванович Коновалов; 12 September 1882 – 30 March 1936) was a Russian Imperial Army officer, Lieutenant Colonel of the General Staff and a hero of the First World War. He participated in the White movement, serving as Quartermaster General of the Staff of the Commander-in-Chief of the Russian Army under General Wrangel (1920), and was promoted to Major general.

== Biography ==
Born into a petty-bourgeois family, Konovalov was a native of Akkerman in the Bessarabia Governorate. He passed the examination for the rank of second-class volunteer at the Kherson Progymnasium.

He graduated from the Odessa Infantry Junker School and was commissioned as podpraporshchik (junior ensign) in the 134th Feodosia Infantry Regiment. He was promoted to podporuchik (second lieutenant) on 5 September 1902, to poruchik (first lieutenant) on 20 October 1906, and to staff captain on 20 October 1910.

=== First World War ===
In 1914, Konovalov completed two years at the Nikolaev Military Academy. At the outbreak of the First World War, he was assigned back to his regiment. He was awarded the Golden Weapon for Bravery:

For, in the battles of 11 October 1914 near the villages of Smolnya, Lopushanka, and Khemina, and on 16 October near Golovechko, while acting as Senior Adjutant in the General Staff, he repeatedly conducted successful reconnaissance and selected advantageous positions under enemy fire, where our troops held out in fierce and prolonged fighting against the enemy.

He was promoted to captain on 29 June 1915 “for length of service.” On 14 July 1916, he was transferred to the General Staff as Senior Adjutant of the 34th Infantry Division headquarters. He was awarded the Order of St. George 4th class:

For, being Senior Adjutant of the 34th Infantry Division headquarters and temporarily acting as Chief of Staff of the division, through personal reconnaissance involving personal danger, he assisted the divisional commander in drawing up the plan for the attack on the strongly fortified Austrian position at the forester’s house near the village of Lopushno-Volitsa. During the operation itself, acting as the commander’s principal aide and carrying out his assignments, he was in the front line under heavy artillery fire. The operation resulted in the defeat of the Austrian 43rd Division, which lost 78 officers and 4,887 enlisted men taken prisoner, about 1,500 killed and wounded, 17 machine guns, two bomb throwers, and much other war materiel.

While serving at the headquarters of the 8th Army, he was under the command of General Makhrov. In 1917, he was promoted to lieutenant colonel, and on 4 September 1917 was appointed acting Assistant Head of the Administration Department of the Quartermaster General's Directorate at the headquarters of the Commander-in-Chief of the armies of the Southwestern Front.

=== Russian Civil War ===
In 1918, Konovalov served in the Hetmanate army; as of 21 November 1918, he was Chief of Staff of the 15th Infantry Division, with the rank of voyskovoi starshina (Cossack senior captain). On 27 November 1918, as part of the Yekaterinoslav Detachment, he marched to join the Armed Forces of South Russia (AFSR), serving as operations officer under Major General P. G. Kisly. Upon arrival in Crimea, he was promoted to colonel and appointed head of the operations section of the Crimea–Azov Army headquarters.

In April 1919, during the retreat from Crimea to the Ak-Manai positions, he organized the defence while acting as Chief of Staff of the Separate Corps, into which the Crimea–Azov Army had been reorganized. By 15 June 1919, he was staff officer of the 3rd Army Corps. On 12 September 1919, he was appointed Senior Adjutant of the operations section of the headquarters of the Novorossiysk Region forces, and from 24 February to 10 March 1920 he temporarily served as Chief of Staff of the same.

In March 1920, he was appointed Quartermaster General of the headquarters of General P. N. Wrangel, newly installed as Commander-in-Chief of the AFSR, acting as his closest collaborator in operational decisions. On 6 June 1920, he was promoted to major general. In August 1920, Wrangel dispatched him to oversee the evacuation of the Kuban landing force, replacing General D. P. Dratsenko as Chief of Staff of the troops involved in this operation. He was among the key organizers of the Evacuation of the Crimea.

=== Emigration ===
After the evacuation of the remnants of Wrangel's forces from Crimea to Turkey, Konovalov stayed there only a few weeks. Before the end of 1920, his position as Quartermaster General was abolished, after which he moved to Bulgaria. He lived for a time in Ruse, then moved to Varna, where he opened a sausage factory.

In 1929, at the invitation of his former comrade Colonel P. P. Melchakov, engaged in business in Romania, Konovalov moved there, receiving Romanian citizenship for being a native of Bessarabia and became director of a forestry concession in the Transylvanian commune of Derna. At first, his business prospered, but in 1932 he had a serious conflict with the new owners of the company, the Gatovsky brothers. The dispute escalated over several years and culminated on 18 November 1935 in an armed clash in which Konovalov was shot and struck on the head with a rifle butt. The latter injury proved fatal: an undiagnosed skull fracture led to a purulent infection, from which he died on 30 March 1936 in a Cluj hospital.

== Family ==
- Wife — Zoya Vasilievna, née Skoropisova
- Son — Valery (b. 17 June 1909)

== See also ==
- White movement
- Pyotr Wrangel
- Pavel Fyodorovich Keller
