= Always with Honor: The Memoirs of General Wrangel =

Memoirs of Russian general Pyotr Wrangel

Always with Honour
- Author: Pyotr Wrangel
- Original title: Записки
- Language: Russian
- Subject: Russian Revolution, Russian Civil War, White movement
- Genre: Memoir
- Publisher: Медный всадник (Russian, 1928); Williams & Norgate (English, 1929); Robert Speller & Sons (Always with Honour, 1957)
- Publication date: 1928
- English publication date: 1929
- Pages: 356 (1929 English edition)

Always with Honour, first published in English as The Memoirs of General Wrangel: The Last Commander-in-Chief of the Russian National Army, is the memoir of Russian military commander Pyotr Wrangel (1878–1928), the last commander of the White in Russia during the Russian Civil War. The memoir covers the disintegration of the Imperial Russian Army during the Russian Revolution, Wrangel's service in the White forces, his disagreements with Anton Denikin, his command in Crimea in 1920, the policies of his government, the final campaigns against the Red Army, and the evacuation of Crimea in November 1920.

The work was first published posthumously in Russian in Berlin in 1928 as Записки (Zapiski, "Notes" or "Memoirs"), occupying books 5 and 6 of the émigré historical series Белое дело: Летопись белой борьбы (Beloe delo: Letopis' beloi bor'by, "The White Cause: Chronicle of the White Struggle").

An English translation by Sophie Goulston was published in London by Williams & Norgate in 1929 under the title The Memoirs of General Wrangel: The Last Commander-in-Chief of the Russian National Army. The English edition was translated through an intermediate French text rather than directly from the complete Russian publication; according to its bibliographic record, detailed material considered to be of primarily Russian interest had been omitted from the French version in accordance with Wrangel's instructions. Robert Speller & Sons republished the English text in New York in 1957 as Always with Honour, with a foreword by former United States president Herbert Hoover.

== Background ==
Wrangel was an officer in the Imperial Russian Army who became one of the most prominent commanders of the anti-Bolshevik forces during the Russian Civil War. He served under General Anton Denikin in the Armed Forces of South Russia and commanded White forces during campaigns in the northern Caucasus and southern Russia.

Wrangel and Denikin developed serious disagreements over military strategy and political policy during 1919. Their dispute, particularly concerning the White advance toward Moscow and the causes of its failure, subsequently became a major controversy in Russian émigré accounts of the Civil War. Wrangel's memoir was one of the principal texts through which Wrangel's interpretation of the dispute entered the historical record.

After the collapse of Denikin's forces, Wrangel succeeded him as commander-in-chief in Crimea in April 1920. He reorganized the remaining forces and attempted to combine military operations with political, administrative, and agrarian reforms. Following the Red Army's breakthrough into Crimea in November 1920, Wrangel directed the evacuation of White troops and civilians by sea.

Wrangel composed his recollections after his departure from Russia. The memoir concentrates on the period from November 1916 to November 1920 rather than providing a complete autobiography. Its narrative combines retrospective recollection with orders, telegrams, correspondence, official declarations, military reports and other contemporary documents.

== Publication history ==
=== Russian publication ===
Wrangel's memoirs were published after his death in Berlin in 1928. They formed books 5 and 6 of Beloe delo, an émigré documentary and historical series edited by General Alexei von Lampe. The published Russian title described the work as covering the "Southern Front" from November 1916 to November 1920.

Historian Giovanni Savino has described Beloe delo as a project intended to collect accounts by leading White figures and construct a historical record of the movement. Savino characterizes the series at the same time as closely associated with Wrangel's political circle and as competing with other émigré interpretations of the Civil War, particularly Denikin's Ocherki russkoi smuty (Russian Turmoil).

The two-volume memoir has subsequently been republished in a number of Russian editions. A bibliographic survey of Russian Civil War literature records, among others, Moscow editions issued in 1991 and 1992 and later republication in collections of White-movement writings.

=== English Publication ===
The first English-language edition was published in London in 1929 as The Memoirs of General Wrangel: The Last Commander-in-Chief of the Russian National Army, translated by Sophie Goulston and comprising 356 pages. It was based on a French version rather than directly on the 1928 Russian. In 1957, Robert Speller & Sons published an American edition in New York as Always with Honour in its "Makers of History" series, retaining the 356-page text and adding a foreword by Herbert Hoover. The title later became widely associated with the English memoir, with some reprints using the Americanized spelling Always with Honor.

== Contents ==
The memoir is divided broadly between Wrangel's experiences during the revolutionary collapse and the earlier southern White campaigns, and his tenure as commander-in-chief in Crimea during 1920.

The first part describes the deterioration of discipline in the Imperial Russian Army during 1917, the effects of the February Revolution and October Revolution, and Wrangel's subsequent entry into the White movement. It then recounts campaigns in the Kuban, northern Caucasus and southern Russia, including the capture of Tsaritsyn and the failure of the White advance toward Moscow.

A common subject in Notes is Wrangel's conflict with Denikin. Wrangel criticizes Denikin's strategic decisions and presents his own proposals as alternatives to policies he believed contributed to the defeat of the Armed Forces of South Russia. The memoir thus operates not only as a personal military narrative but also as Wrangel's contribution to the postwar dispute over responsibility for the White defeat.

The second half of the book is about Wrangel's assumption of supreme command in 1920. It describes the reorganization of the remaining White forces, administration of Crimea, military operations in northern Taurida and the Kuban, and the attempt to establish a more effective political program. Particular attention is given to the question of agrarian reform. Wrangel's government attempted to establish a legal framework under which peasants could obtain land ownership while preserving administrative order. His memoir presents these measures as an effort to correct earlier White failures to develop a social program capable of competing politically with the Bolsheviks.

The concluding military chapters describe the increasingly unfavorable strategic position of the White forces in autumn 1920, the Red Army offensive against Crimea and the decision to evacuate. The narrative ends with the departure of White troops and civilians from Crimea and the beginning of the Russian emigration after the civil war.

== Wrangel–Denikin controversy ==
The publication of the memoir became part of an existing dispute between supporters of Wrangel and Denikin within the Russian emigration. Savino describes Wrangel's memoirs as, in part, an answer to Denikin's interpretation of the Civil War and notes their polemical criticism of Denikin's decisions.

In 1930 Denikin responded publicly in an essay titled "Мой ответ" (Moi otvet, "My Answer"), published in the émigré periodical Illiustrirovannaia Rossiia. Denikin disputed Wrangel's reconstruction of their disagreements, defended the logic of his Moscow offensive, and challenged Wrangel's account of responsibility for the retreat of the southern White forces.

Alexei von Lampe, who had edited the Beloe delo series and regarded himself as responsible for the preservation and publication of Wrangel's Notes, replied to Denikin later in 1930 in a series of articles titled "Wrangel–Denikin". Savino describes von Lampe's intervention as a defense of Wrangel and his memoirs.

The exchange helped make the memoir part of a broader struggle over historical memory within the White emigration, in which former commanders and their supporters sought to explain the failure of the anti-Bolshevik armies and defend competing interpretations of their leadership.

== Reception ==
The memoir has been used as a primary source in scholarship on the Russian Civil War, the White movement and Wrangel's government. Its value derives in part from Wrangel's position near the center of political and military decision-making during the final phase of White resistance in southern Russia. C.B. Karpenko notes that historians and biographers have relied on Wrangel's Notes, but argues that the surviving Wrangel archive reveals the importance of checking the published account against contemporary documentation. According to Karpenko, archival evidence can expose discrepancies, omissions and retrospective shaping in the memoir. The work has been studied as part of Russian emigration. Savino treats its publication within Beloe delo as part of von Lampe's effort to construct and preserve a particular account of the White cause, while emphasizing the conflict between Wrangel and Denikin historiography. Historian Paul F. Robinson later used the phrase "Always with Honour" as the title of a study of the code and collective identity of White Russian officers, discussing the importance of honor in the White officer corps' conception of itself and of its struggle against Bolshevism.

== Archives ==
Wrangel's papers were deposited at the Hoover Institution Library and Archives at Stanford University. The collection includes personal and official correspondence and documents relating to the White movement and Russian military emigration. Karpenko's study of the archive emphasizes the role of Wrangel's secretary N. M. Kotliarevskii in its formation and transfer and argues that the papers are necessary for evaluating the published memoir critically.

== Editions ==
- Врангель, П. Н. (1928). Записки: Южный фронт (ноябрь 1916 г. — ноябрь 1920 г.). Белое дело: Летопись белой борьбы (in Russian). Vol. 5–6. Berlin: Медный всадник.
- Wrangel, Peter N. (1929). The Memoirs of General Wrangel: The Last Commander-in-Chief of the Russian National Army. Translated by Goulston, Sophie. London: Williams & Norgate.
- Wrangel, Peter N. (1957). Always with Honour. Foreword by Herbert Hoover. New York: Robert Speller & Sons.

== See also ==
- Pyotr Wrangel
- Anton Denikin
- White movement
- Armed Forces of South Russia
- Russian Army (Wrangel)
- Evacuation of the Crimea
- White émigré
