= South Russian Government =

Russian White movement government, 1920

South Russian Government Южнорусское Правительство (Russian) Južnorusskoe Pravitel'stvo
- 1920
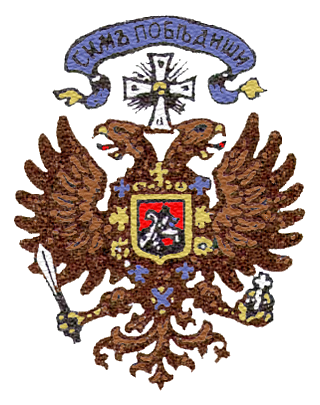
- Flag Coat of arms

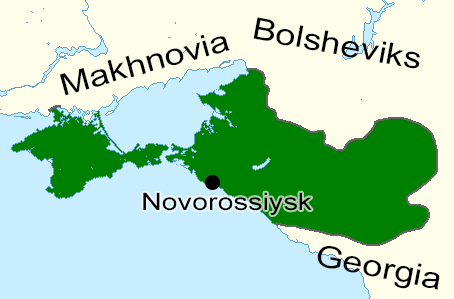
- Status: Military government of South Russia
- Capital: Novorossiysk
- Common languages: Russian
- Commander-In-Chief of the Armed Forces of South Russia
  - 1920: Anton Denikin
- Historical era: Russian Civil War
  - Bolshevik invasion of Crimea / Fall of Second Crimean Regional Government White Movement offensive: Mar–Apr 1919 June 1919
  - South Russian Government established: March 1920
  - South Russian Government dissolved: March 30 1920
  - Government of South Russia established: April 1920
Preceded by	Succeeded by
AFSR; South Russia	South Russia
- Today part of: Russia (de facto) Ukraine (de jure)

The South Russian Government (Russian: Южнорусское Правительство) was a Russian White movement government established by Armed Forces of South Russia commander Anton Denikin in Novorossiysk, Kuban, in March 1920 during the Russian Civil War.

== History ==
On 27 March 1920, Denikin was forced to evacuate Novorossiysk for Crimea, which the Whites had controlled since June 1919. However, the slipshod retreat discredited Denikin and he stepped down, succeeded by General Pyotr Wrangel, who was elected new Commander-in-Chief of the White Army by military council. The South Russian Government was dissolved on 30 March in Feodosiya. Wrangel set up a new Government of South Russia in Sevastopol in April.

This attempted establishment of civil government by the White authorities was a recognition that previous neglect of civil administration by the General Command of the Armed Forces of South Russia had cost the Whites civilian support.

== See also ==
- Political positions of Anton Denikin
- History of Crimea
- Russian Civil War
- Post-Russian Empire states
- South Russia (1919–1920)
