= South Russia (1919–1920) =

Short-lived state (1919-1920)

South Russia / South of Russia Юг России
- 1918–1920
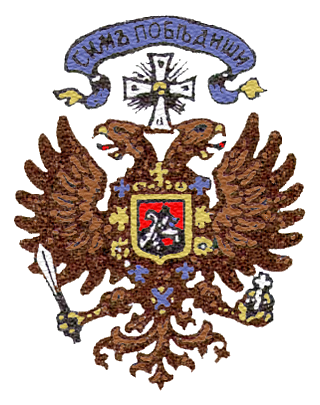
- Flag Coat of arms

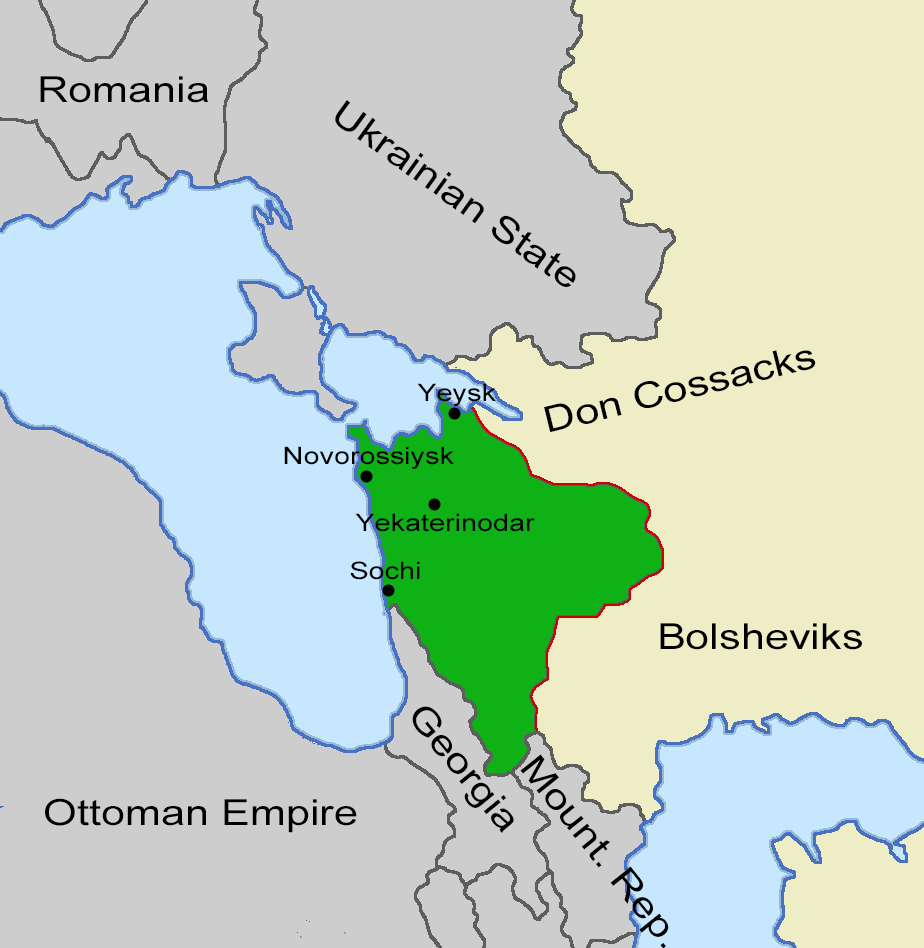
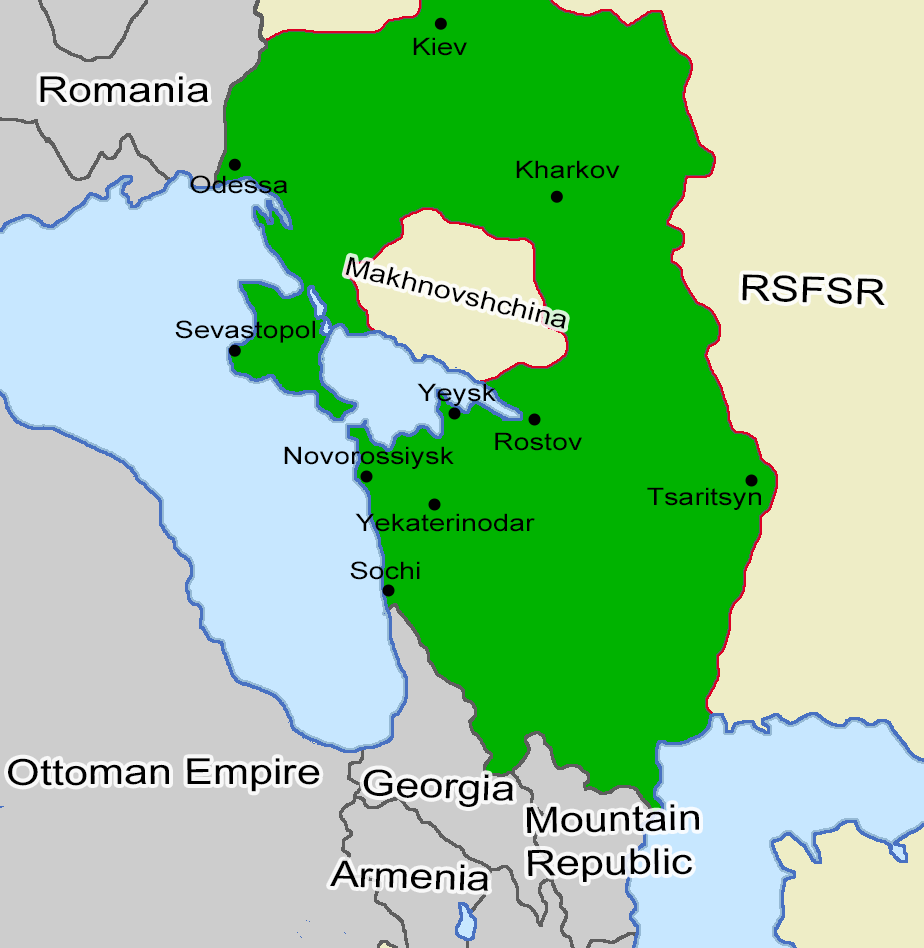
- Approximate territory of South Russia in 1919
- Status: Quasi-state
- Capital: Yekaterinodar
- Common languages: Russian, Ukrainian
- Religion: Orthodox Christianity
- Government: Various military governments General Command of the Armed Forces of South Russia
- Commander-in-Chief of the Armed Forces of South Russia
  - 8 Jan 1919–27 March 1920: Anton Denikin
- Historical era: Russian Civil War
  - Established: 8 January 1918
  - Disestablished: 27 March 1920
- Currency: Ruble
Preceded by
AFSR
North Caucasian Soviet Republic
Makhnovshchina
UPR
Chyhyryn Soviet Republic
Succeeded by
South Russian Government

South Russia or South of Russia (Russian: Юг Росси́и, romanized: Yug Rossii), also known as White South (Russian: Белый Юг, romanized: Bely Yug) was a short-lived military quasi-state that existed in Eastern Europe during the Southern Front of the Russian Civil War from 1918 to 1920.

South Russia was established on 8 January 1919 by the White movement after reorganization of their armed forces in the Southern Front, consisting of territory under their control in Ukraine, Crimea, Kuban, the North Caucasus, Black Earth region, Lower Volga, and the Don region. South Russia was an anti-Bolshevik military state under the Armed Forces of South Russia led by General Anton Denikin, and its borders were undefined, changing based on victories or defeats against the Red Army. In March 1920, Denikin established the South Russian Government in Novorossiysk, an attempt at a civil government with the General Command of the Armed Forces of South Russia serving as the legislative body. Less than a month later, the Whites were forced to evacuate from Novorossiysk, the Armed Forces of South Russia and the South Russian Government were dissolved. Denikin resigned and delegated power to General Pyotr Wrangel, who established the new Government of South Russia in Sevastopol and the new Russian Army, commonly known as the Army of Wrangel in April.

During mid-1920, South Russia's territory had receded to the White stronghold on Crimea, a highly defensible location that had repelled several Red offensives. The Whites were defeated at the Siege of Perekop in November 1920, losing the highly strategic Perekop Isthmus and leaving Crimea vulnerable to Red invasion. Wrangel ordered the evacuation of Crimea, effectively ending his government and the Southern Front in Red Victory. South Russia ceased to exist after the Red conquest of Crimea, and its territory was divided between Soviet Russia, the Ukrainian Soviet Socialist Republic, and the territory controlled by the Revolutionary Insurgent Army of Ukraine of Nestor Makhno.

In Soviet historiography, South Russia was called the White South or White South of Russia, in reference to the concept of the White Army.
