= Government of South Russia =

Post–Russian Empire government

Government of South Russia Правительство Юга России (Russian) Praviteĺstvo Juga Rossii
- 1920
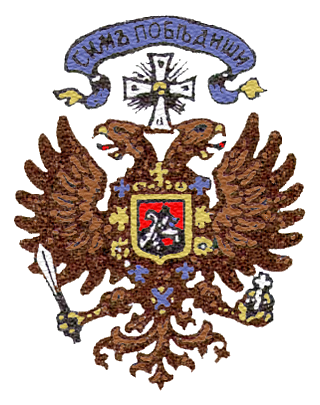
- Flag Coat of arms

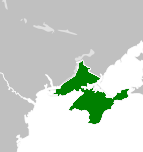
- Status: Military government of South Russia
- Capital: Sevastopol
- Common languages: Russian
- Commander-In-Chief of the Armed Forces of South Russia
  - 1920: Pyotr Wrangel
- Historical era: Russian Civil War
  - Established: 4 April 1920
  - Dissolved: 17 November 1920
Preceded by	Succeeded by
South Russia	CASSR
- Today part of: Russia (de facto) Ukraine (de jure)

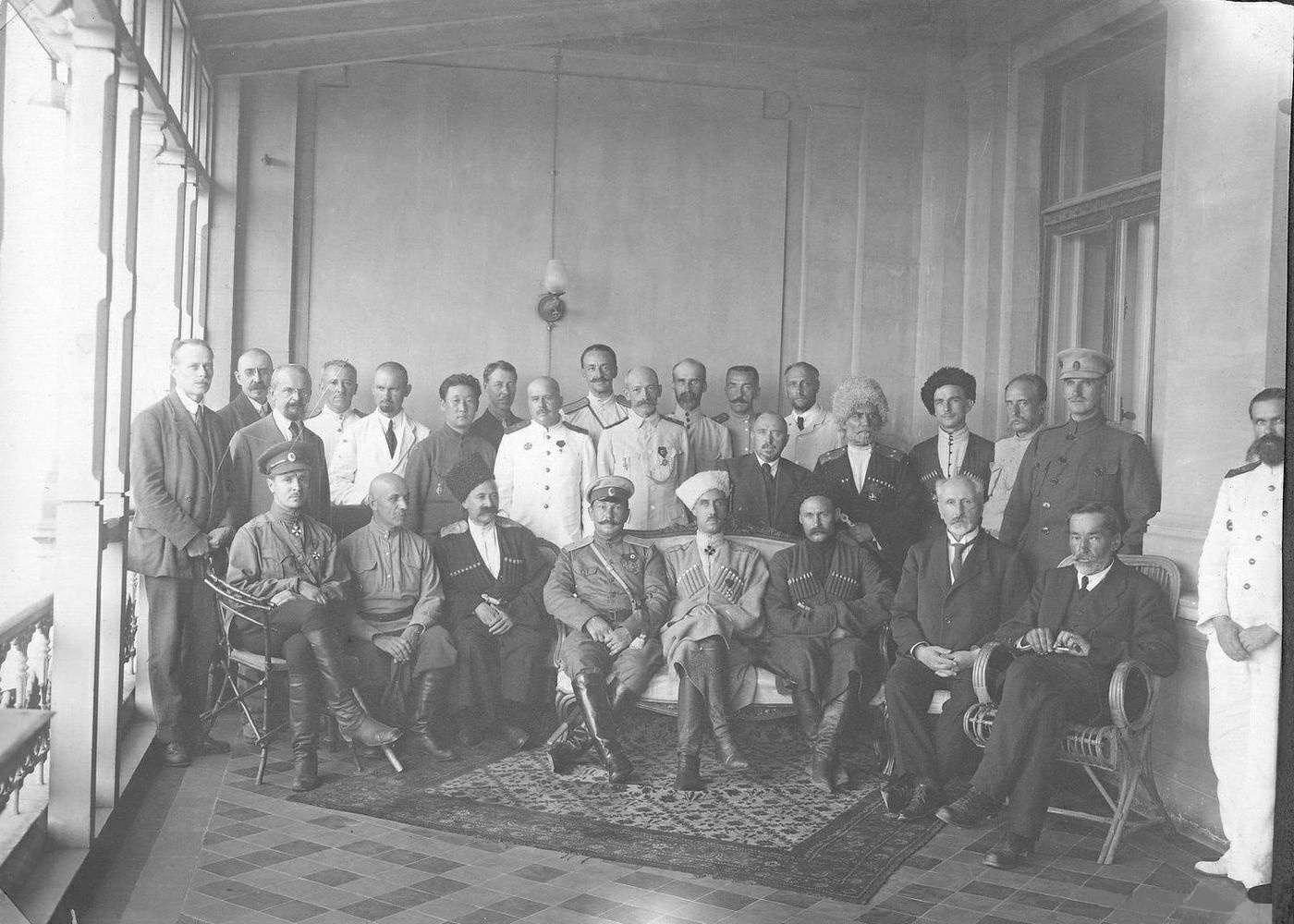
Government of the South of Russia. Crimea, Sevastopol, 1920

The Government of South Russia (Russian: Правительство Юга России, romanized: Pravitel'stvo Yuga Rossii) was a White movement government established in Sevastopol, Crimea in April 1920.

== History ==
The government was the successor to General Anton Denikin's South Russian Government (Южнорусское Правительство Yuzhnorusskoye Pravitel'stvo) set up in February 1920.

General Pyotr Wrangel was the pravitel' (правитель, "ruler") while the head of the government itself was the Chairman of the Council of Ministers, Alexander Krivoshein, with Peter Berngardovich Struve serving as foreign minister. The government officially adopted the name "Government of South Russia" on 16 August 1920, and it controlled the area of the former Russian Empire's Taurida Governorate, i.e., the Crimean Peninsula and adjacent areas of the mainland.

The Government of South Russia received assistance from the Allied Powers including France (which recognized it in August 1920) and the United States, as well as from the newly independent Poland. However, foreign support gradually dried up so offensives of the former Armed Forces of South Russia and the Volunteer Army, now called the Russian Army, had failed in Northern Taurida.

In early November with the Perekop–Chongar operation, the Bolsheviks won decisive victories and entered Crimea proper. Between 7 and 17 November it broke through Russian Army defenses on the Isthmus of Perekop, crossing the Sivash and capturing the Lithuanian Peninsula, the fortified Turkish Wall, Yushun, and Chongar positions. After breaking through at Perekop, the front advanced into Crimea. Wrangel initiated an evacuation of 146,000 people to Constantinople with the last boats departing on 16 November. With this withdrawal, the final remnants of the White forces in European Russia were defeated.

== See also ==
- South Russia (1919–1920)
