= Army of Wrangel =

Russian Army
- Русская армия Русская армія
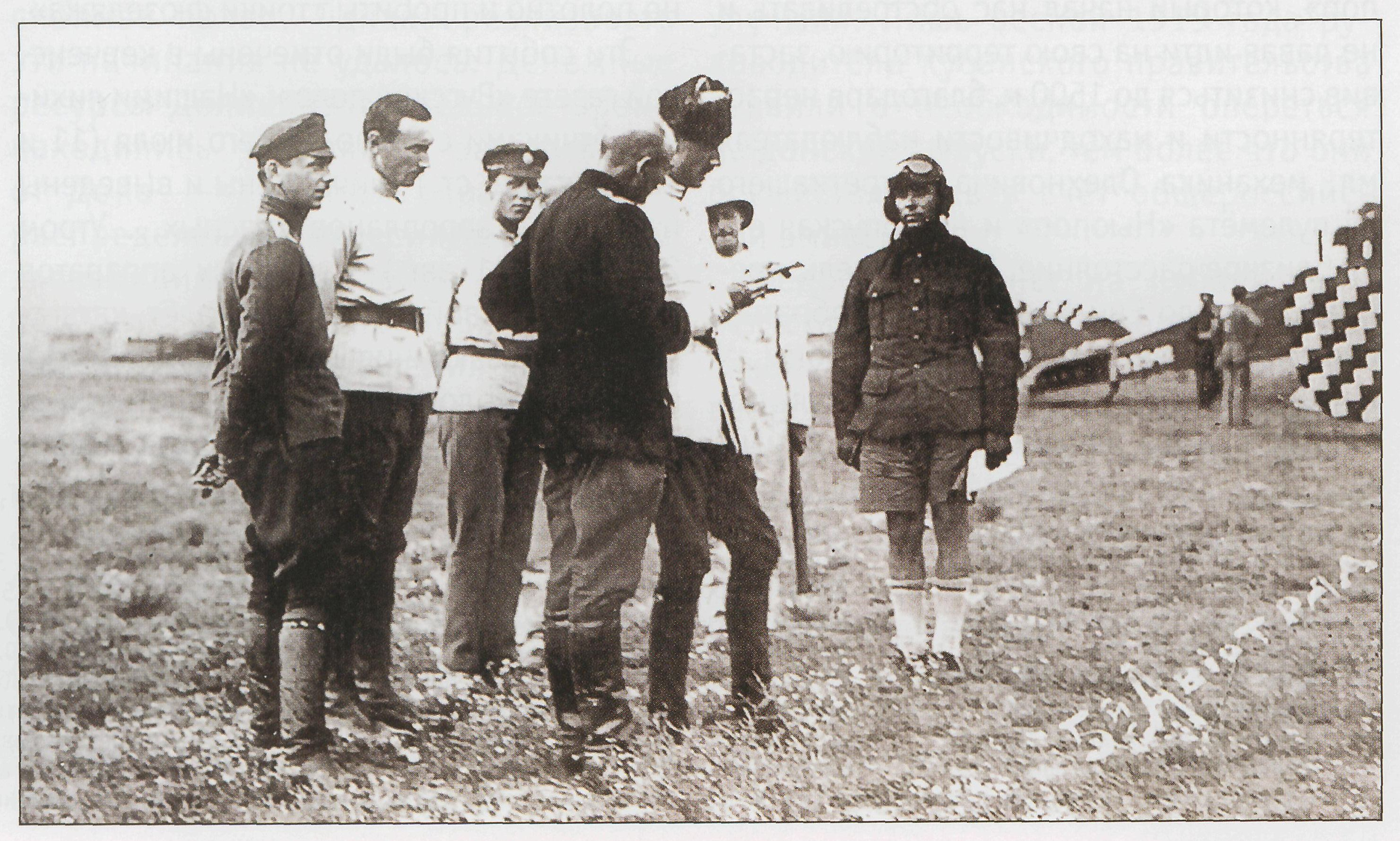
- General P. N. Wrangel accepts the report of the pilot of the 5th aviation squadron
- Active: March 28, 1920–November 16, 1920
- Country: South Russia
- Allegiance: Government of South Russia
- Branch: White Army
- Size: 300,000 (September 1920)
- Garrison/HQ: Sevastopol, Taurida
- Nickname: Army of Wrangel
- Engagements: Southern Front of the Russian Civil War: Northern Taurida Operation; Siege of Perekop; Evacuation of the Crimea; Albanian-Yugoslav border war (1921)

Commanders
- Commander-in-chief: Pyotr Wrangel

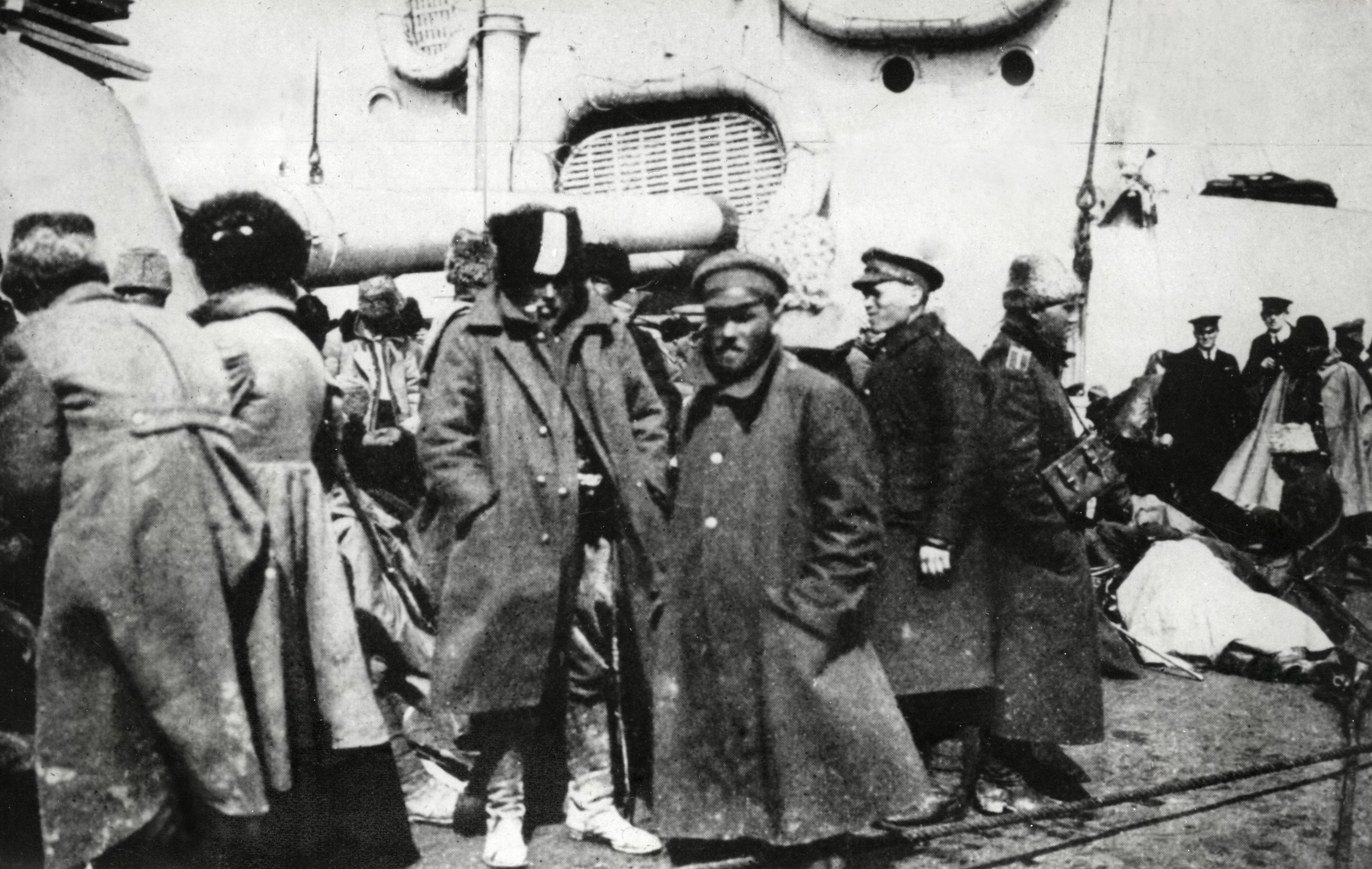
Transport of the Army of Wrangel from Crimea in November 1920

The Russian Army (Russian: Русская армия, romanized: Russkaya armiya), (Note: Pre-1918 orthography: Русская армія, romanized: Russkaya armiya.) commonly known as the Army of Wrangel (Russian: Армия Врангеля), (Note: Pre-1918 orthography: Армія Врангеля.) was a White Army active in South Russia during the Russian Civil War from March to November 1920. It was officially formed on 28 April 1920 from the merger of several White armies, including the Volunteer Army, in a reorganization of the Armed Forces of South Russia. The Army of Wrangel, nicknamed after its commander General Pyotr Wrangel, fought against Bolshevik forces in the Southern Front and the Ukrainian War of Independence. In November 1920, following defeat at the Siege of Perekop and being vastly outnumbered, the Army of Wrangel organized a successful evacuation from Crimea and subsequently dissolved. Veterans of the army were among the founders of the Russian All-Military Union.

== Composition ==
The Russian Army had a staff and five Army Corps:

Corps	Commander	Composition of the unit	Notes
Staff	Chief of Staff Pavel Chatilov	Military leadership, engineering direction, headquarters at Sevastopol, general staff, naval direction, counter-espionage, and others	
1st Army Corps	Lieutenant-General Alexander Kutepov	Drozdovsky division; Markov division; Kornilov division; Alekseyev division	
2nd Army Corps	Lieutenant-General Yakov Slashchov	13th Infantry division; 34th Infantry division; a cavalry brigade	
Don Corps	Fyodor Abramov	2nd Don division; 3rd Don division; a guard brigade	Formed on 1 May 1920. Integrated into the 1st Army Corps on 4 September 1920.
Pyotr Pisarev's Corps	Pyotr Pisarev	3rd Cavalry division; Kuban Cossack division; Terek-Astrakhan brigade; Chechnya brigade	Formerly part of the Volunteer Army. Transformed on 7 July 1920 into the Cavalry Corps, by the grouping of the 1st and 2nd Cavalry divisions under Ivan Barbovitch. Incorporated into the 1st Army Corps on 4 September 1920.
Sergei Ulagay's group	Lieutenant-General Sergei Ulagay	1st Kuban Cossacks division; 2nd Kuban Cossacks division; Terek-Astrakhan Brigade	Units dedicated to the landing in Kuban.

=== Strength ===
- May 1920: 22,000 to 27,000 men (at the beginning of 1920 in Crimea 3,500 men, approximately 35,000 to 40,000 were evacuated from the North Caucasus).
- June 1920: 25,000 men.
- September 1920: the army and its rear bases had about 300,000 men, of whom about 50,000 on the front, 80,000 in the military camps and 30,000 injured. In September the combat troops of the army counted 30,000 to 35,000 men (33,000 in mid-September).
- October 1920: 25,000 to 27,000. Of the 50,000 Russian Army officers, 6,000 were in the combat troops, 13,000 in support of the front, and 31,000 at the back (including the sick and wounded).

== Sources ==
- Besier, Gerhard; Stokłosa, Katarzyna (2014). European Dictatorships: A Comparative History of the Twentieth Century. Newcastle upon Tyne: Cambridge Scholars Publishing. ISBN 9781443855211.
