= Ulagay's Landing =

1920 White Army and Kuban Cossack military operation during the Russian Civil War

- Part of the Southern Front of the Russian Civil War
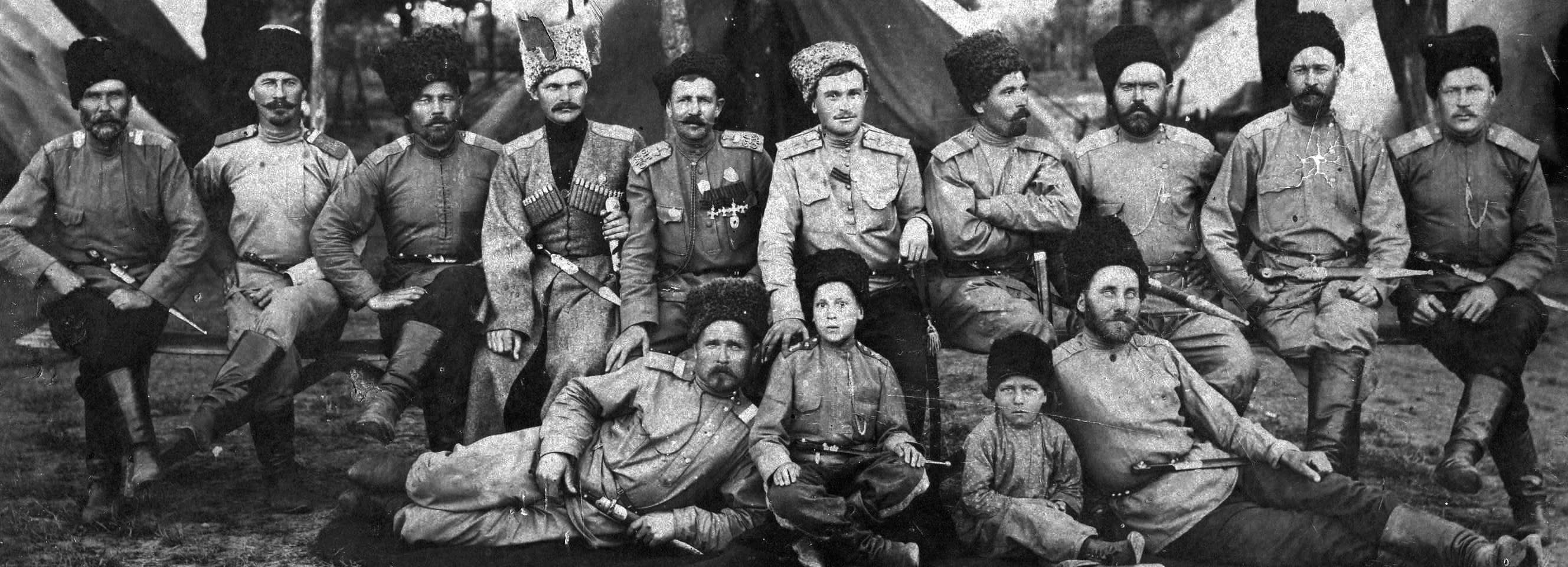
- Kuban Cossacks during the Russian Civil War
| Date | August 14 and September 7, 1920 |
| Location | Kuban, Southern Russia |
| Result | Red Army victory |

Belligerents
| (Russia) Army of Wrangel; Kuban Cossacks | (Russian Soviet Federative Socialist Republic) Red Army |

Commanders and leaders
| (Russia) Sergei Ulagay | (Russian Soviet Federative Socialist Republic) Mikhail Levandovsky |

Strength
| 12,500 men, 12 guns, 150 machine guns, 3 armored cars, 8 aircraft | 24,100 men 133 guns 550 machine guns Azov Flotilla |

Casualties and losses
| Unknown | Unknown |

Ulagay's Landing is the generally accepted name for a military operation by Pyotr Wrangel's White Russian Army, under command of Sergei Ulagay, against the Red Army in the Kuban between August 14 and September 7, 1920 during the Russian Civil War.

== The purpose of the operation ==
After their defeat in the North Caucasus Operation (1920), the White Army remained only in control of the Crimean Peninsula. Despite the fact that by the beginning of August 1920, the White Russian Army had already had a number of military successes in the Northern Taurida Operation, they were not decisive, and the Army of Wrangel remained locked in Northern Tavria. Some drastic actions were needed to retake the strategic initiative from the Bolsheviks.

In this context, from July 1920 a plan was developed for a large landing operation in the Kuban. According to the plan of the Commander-in-Chief of the Russian Army, Lieutenant General Baron Wrangel, the landing of a large force in the Kuban could create a new anti-Soviet front there and expand the socio-economic, political and territorial base of the White movement in mobilizing the anti-Soviet-minded local population (Kuban Cossacks). The landing was to be carried out in three places and the groups were to occupy Yekaterinodar, Maikop, and subsequently the whole Kuban area.

== The operation ==
Ulugay with his force of 8,000 men landed on August 14, at the Vereshchaginsky-farm, 7 km north of the village of Primorsko-Akhtarskaya, which was also taken after a battle with two companies of the Red Army of some 500 men. The vanguard of the White cavalry under personal command of General Ulagay immediately advanced towards Timashyovsk, the railway junction leading to Yekaterinodar. After several fierce battles, by August 18, the White army had already captured a significant bridgehead of 80 km wide and about 90 km deep.

On August 15, a second assault force of 1,500 men commanded by General Cherepov landed north of Novorossiysk. They were joined by 2,000 Cossacks from the neighboring villages. To counter the invasion, the commander of the Caucasian Red Front, Vladimir Gittis, gathered numerous reserve troops (3 rifle divisions, 4 cavalry and 1 rifle brigades) and formed two groups: one to strike from the north into the flank and rear of the Ulagay group, and one for a frontal strike from the east.

From August 18 to 21 August, the units of General Ulagay were regrouping and no longer advanced. On August 21 and 22, the Red Army attacked and the Whites could not withstand and began to retreat, until the front stabilized after renewed White counterattacks.

On the night of August 25, Wrangel executed a third landing of some 3,000 men under the command of General Kharlamov on the Taman Peninsula. This group was able to take the Peninsula but was unable to advance further than the isthmuses. The landing party was soon counterattacked and by mid-September 2, the troops of Kharlamov were evacuated.

The troops of the second landing under General Cherepov had also been surrounded and forced to evacuate on August 26, after having suffered heavy casualties.

On August 30, after stubborn fighting, the Soviet troops occupied the village of Stepna, cutting General Ulagay's Army into two. Despite fierce counterattacks, the Whites failed to retake Stepna. The White now had no option but to withdraw. Under the cover of rearguard battles, the landing forces began to evacuate. By September 7, the evacuation of the main force of General Ulagay was completed in good order from Achuevo. Despite a violent storm that destroyed the marina, everything was shipped out : personnel, horses, artillery, and even armored cars.

On September 10, Commissar Sergo Ordzhonikidze reported victory to V.I. Lenin, who considered the defeat of the Ulagay's landing a matter of "national importance".

== Results of the operation ==
The main reason for the failure of the operation was that the commander of the landing army, at the decisive moment during the offensive, halted the advance to allow the regrouping of his troops, despite the initial plan for a rapid offensive towards Yekaterinodar. This delay enabled the Red Army to rush in reserve troops, create a numerical advantage and block a further White advance.

The only positive result from the operation for the Whites was the significant replenishment of Wrangels Russian Army with men and horses. Despite severe losses during the fighting, more troops returned to the Crimea than had left. Around 10,000 Kuban Cossacks had joined the units evacuating back to the Crimea. They brought 6,000 horses with them, which made it possible to significantly strengthen the White cavalry. For example, the division of General Shifner-Markevich lost around 300 men and 200 horses killed and wounded during the fighting in the Kuban, but withdrew with an additional 1,200 men and 250 horses to the Crimea. According to other sources, in total only 1,500 Kuban Cossacks and 600 horses followed the evacuating Ulagay Force to Crimea, and an important reason for the failure was the lack of response of the war-weary local population to the operation.

On October 12, 1920, a truce was concluded between Poland and Soviet Russia. This enabled the Red Army to move troops from the Polish front to the Crimea and launch a successful offensive in November (the Perekop-Chongar operation).
On November 17, the White Army evacuated the Crimea and the war on the Southern Front came to an end.
