= Lithuanian Peninsula =

Lithuanian Peninsula Chuvash Peninsula
- Peninsula
- Interactive map of Lithuanian Peninsula
- Coordinates: 46°8′35″N 33°50′23″E
- Location: Crimea
- Part of: Crimea

The Lithuanian Peninsula (Ukrainian: Литовський півострів; Russian: Литовский полуостров), also known as the Chuvash Peninsula, is a small peninsula in the north of the Crimean Peninsula on the Isthmus of Perekop.

It is part of the Krasnoperekopsk region and situated to the east of the city of Armyansk and near the village of Filatovskaya. It extends into the Syvash lagoon.

The maximum height of the peninsula is only 15 meters. The eastern shores have a height of 10 meters, while the western shores are flat.
