= Sergei Ulagay =

Russian general

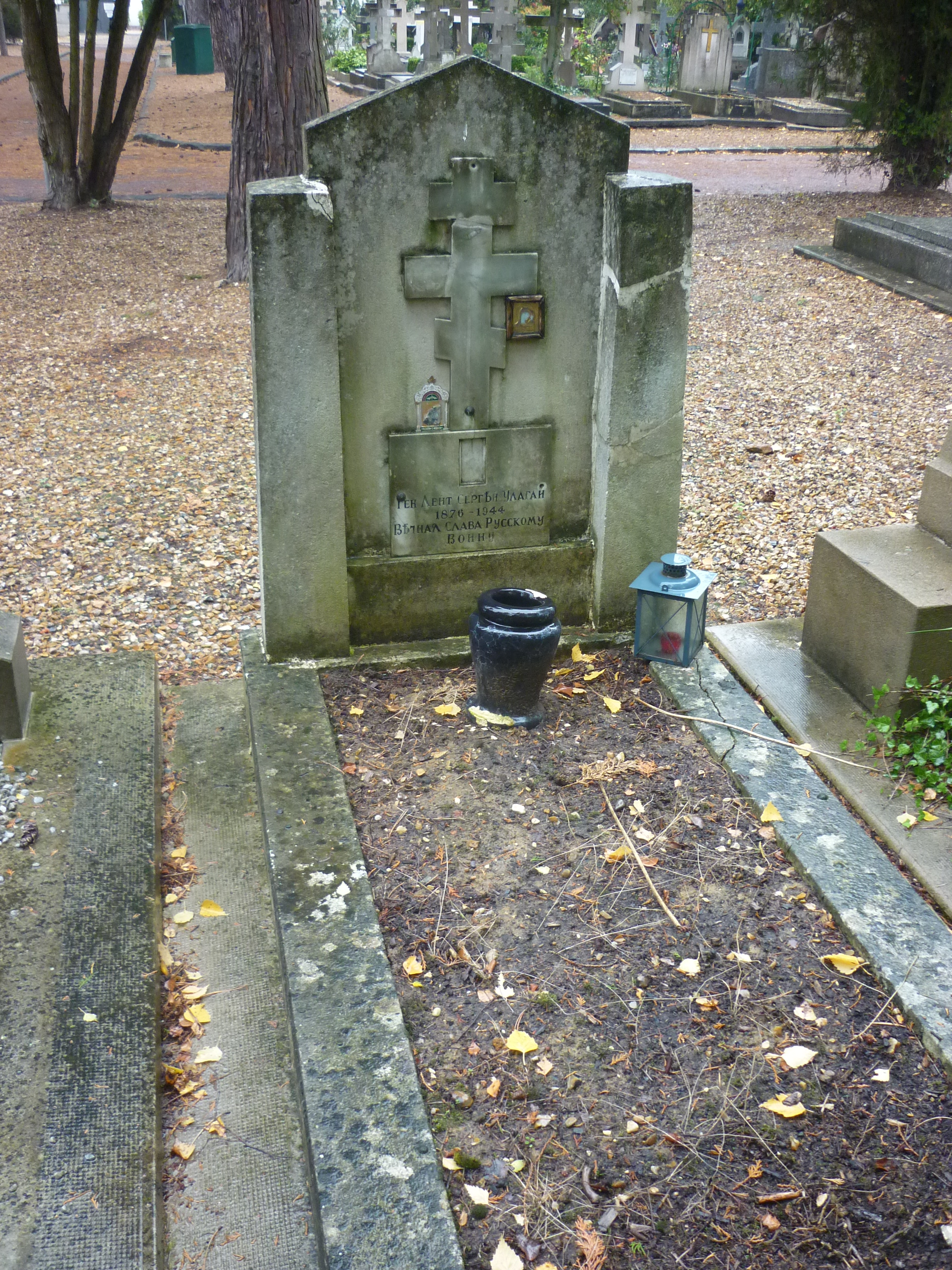
- the tomb of Sergei Ulagay at the Sainte-Geneviève-des-Bois Russian Cemetery.
- Born: October 31, 1876; Russian Empire
- Died: April 29, 1944 (67 years old) Marseille, France
- Allegiance: Russian Empire; White movement
- Service years: 1897–1917 (Russian Empire); 1917–1920 (White movement)
- Conflicts: Russo-Japanese War; World War I; Russian Civil War; Ulagay's Landing

Sergei Ulagay (October 31, 1876 – April 29, 1944) was a White Army general in the Russian Civil War of 1917–1922. He was a veteran of the Russo-Japanese War (1904–1905) and of World War I (1914–1917). He was a recipient (1917) of the Order of St. George.

In May 1919 he defeated Red Army cavalry commander Boris Dumenko in a large cavalry engagement.

General Ulagay allegedly took part in Ahmet Zogu's coup in Albania in December 1924.

He died in Marseille, France. He is buried at Sainte-Geneviève-des-Bois Russian Cemetery south of Paris.

== Bibliography ==
- Рутыч Н. Биографический справочник высших чинов Добровольческой армии и Вооруженных сил Юга России. Moscow, 1997.
- Деникин А. И. (2006). ОЧЕРКИ РУССКОЙ СМУТЫ. Vol. 4, 5. М.: Айрис-пресс. p. 832. ISBN 5-8112-1890-7.
- Bratishka by Igor SOFRONOV
