= Pyotr Wrangel =

Russian general (1878–1928)

Baron Pyotr Wrangel
- Пётр Врангель
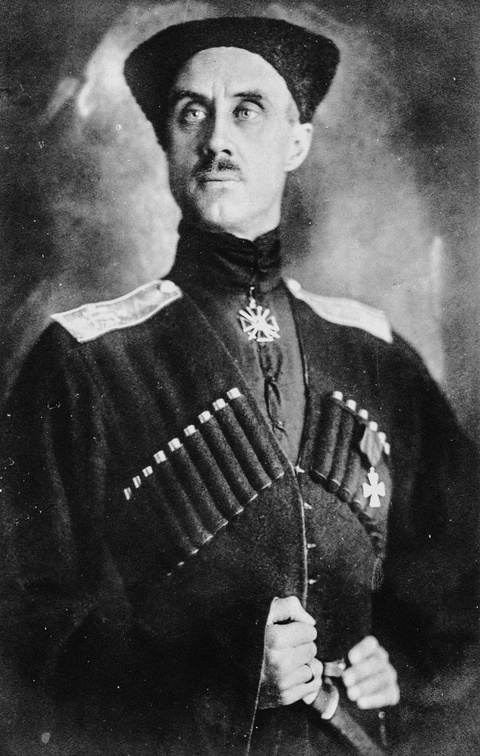
- Wrangel in 1920

Commander-in-Chief of the Armed Forces of South Russia
- In office 4 April – 21 November 1920
- Preceded by: Anton Denikin
- Succeeded by: Office disestablished

Commander of the Caucasus Army
- In office 21 May – 8 December 1919
- Preceded by: Position created
- Succeeded by: Viktor Pokrovsky

President of the Russian All-Military Union Commander of the Russian Army
- In office 1 September 1924 – 25 April 1928
- Preceded by: Position created
- Succeeded by: Grand Duke Nicholas Nikolaevich of Russia

Personal details
- Born: 27 August [O.S. 15 August] 1878 Novalexandrovsk, Kovno Governorate, Russian Empire
- Died: 25 April 1928 (aged 49) Brussels, Belgium
- Awards: See below
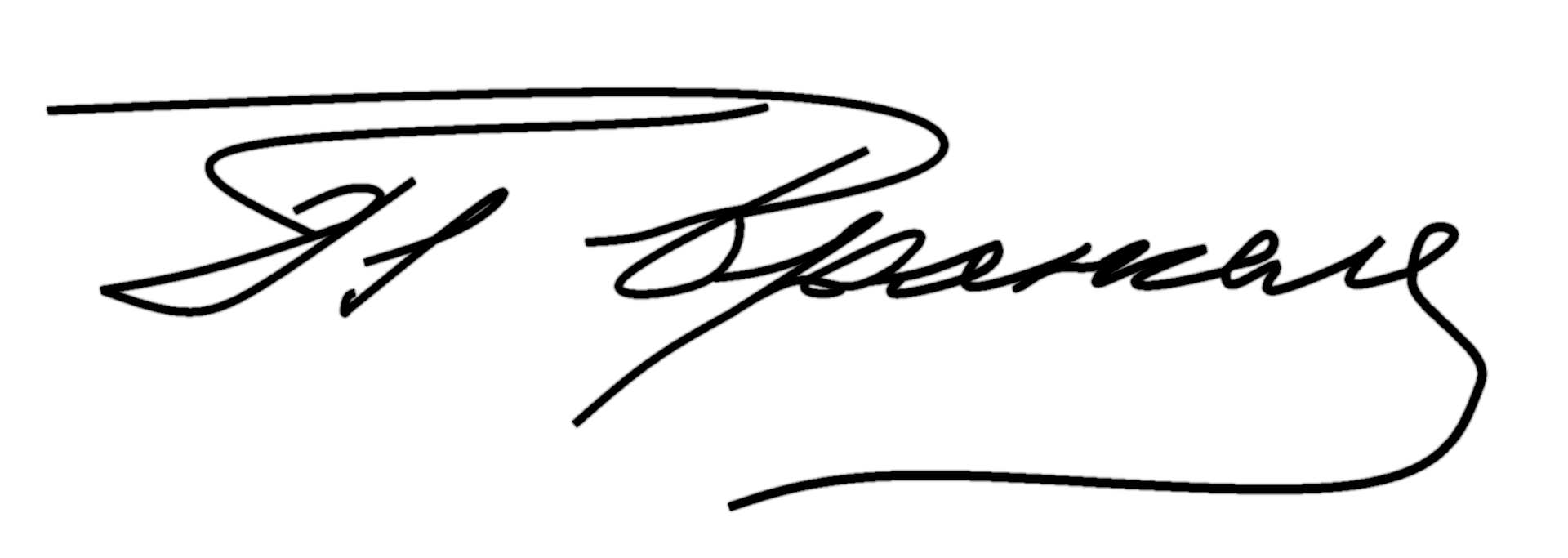
- Signature
- Nickname: The Black Baron

Military service
- Allegiance: Russian Empire (1902–1917); South Russia (1919–1920) White Movement (1917–1920)
- Branch/service: Imperial Russian Army; White Army
- Years of service: 1902–1920
- Rank: Major General
- Commands: Caucasus Army of South Russia
- Battles/wars: Russo-Japanese War; World War I; Battle of Galicia; Gorlice–Tarnów offensive; Brusilov offensive; Russian Civil War; Southern Front of the Russian Civil War; Northern Caucasus Operation (1918–1919); Advance on Moscow (1919); Northern Taurida Operation; Siege of Perekop (1920); Albanian–Yugoslav border war (1921)

Baron Pyotr Nikolayevich Wrangel (Note: In this name that follows East Slavic naming customs, the patronymic is Nikolayevich and the family name is Wrangel.) (Note: /ˈvrænɡəl/, VRAN-gəl; Russian: Пётр Николаевич Врангель [ˈpʲɵtr nʲɪkɐˈlajɪvʲɪtɕ ˈvranɡʲɪlʲ]) (27 August [O.S. 15 August] 1878 – 25 April 1928), nicknamed the "Black Baron", was a Russian military officer who served as a commanding general in the anti-Bolshevik Volunteer Army during the Russian Civil War. In 1920, he became the last commander-in-chief of the White forces in Southern Russia, which he reorganized as the Russian Army.

A scion of the prominent Baltic German Wrangel noble family, Wrangel initially pursued a civilian career at his father's behest, graduating as a mining engineer, but later decided on a military career after volunteering for service in the Russo-Japanese War. A graduate of the Imperial General Staff Academy, he distinguished himself during World War I, becoming one of the first Russian officers to be awarded the Order of St. George for heroism. He rose to the rank of major general.

After the October Revolution, Wrangel joined the Volunteer Army in August 1918 and was given command of major cavalry formations. He became known for his aggressive leadership and battlefield successes in the Northern Caucasus. In 1919, he captured the strategic city of Tsaritsyn but soon clashed with his superior, Anton Denikin, over the latter's Moscow Directive, a plan Wrangel considered strategically flawed. The growing rivalry led to his dismissal from command in December 1919.

Following Denikin's resignation in April 1920, Wrangel was elected commander-in-chief of the shattered White forces in Crimea. He established the Government of South Russia and attempted to win popular support with a wide-ranging series of reforms, including a radical land reform. After initial military successes against the Red Army, his forces were defeated, and he organized a mass evacuation from Crimea in November 1920, successfully evacuating over 145,000 people. In exile, he remained a leader of the White movement and founded the Russian All-Military Union (ROVS) in 1924. He is remembered as the last commander of the White Army, a more able administrator and strategist than his predecessors, who took command when the White cause was already considered lost.

== Early life and career ==
=== Family background ===
Pyotr Wrangel was born in Novoalexandrovsk, Kovno Governorate in the Russian Empire (now Zarasai, Lithuania) on 28 August 1878, the eldest of three brothers. He was a scion of the Wrangel family, a Baltic German noble house that had served the rulers of Sweden, Prussia, Austria, and Russia for over 700 years. The family produced seven field marshals, seven admirals, and dozens of generals. His ancestor, the Swedish Field Marshal Herman Wrangel, was the father of Carl Gustaf Wrangel, who built Skokloster Castle. By the nineteenth century, branches of the family had established themselves in the Russian Empire, including Baron Ferdinand von Wrangel, the explorer and governor-general of Alaska.

Pyotr's father, Baron Nikolai Egorovich Wrangel, was a humanist, art connoisseur, and writer who had rebelled against the family's military tradition. Nikolai later wrote a memoir, From Serfdom to Bolshevism, detailing his life and experiences. Pyotr's mother, Maria Dimitrievna Dementieva-Maikova, was the daughter of an impoverished officer but was well-educated and interested in social reform. The family lived in a liberal, cultured atmosphere in Rostov-on-Don, where Nikolai was a director of several companies.

=== Education and early service ===
Following his father's wishes, Wrangel was sent to a civilian school. His father, interested in gold mining in Siberia, decided that Pyotr should become a mining engineer and enrolled him in the School of Mines in Saint Petersburg. A dutiful son, Wrangel studied diligently and graduated first in his class, receiving a gold medal. Before pursuing his engineering career, he was required to complete his compulsory military service. For the Wrangel family, this meant joining the prestigious Horse Guards of the Russian Imperial Guard’s 1st Guards Cavalry Division; which his father described as the "Family Regiment".

He entered the army on 13 September 1901. Life in the Horse Guards appealed to him, and he decided to apply for a permanent commission. As with all Guards regiments, a commission required a ballot vote by the regiment's officers. According to his son, on the eve of the ballot, Wrangel celebrated his expected promotion and, on returning home, drew his sword and decapitated a row of young trees planted outside the residence of his senior colonel, the humorless Prince Troubetzkoy. The Prince ensured Wrangel was blackballed, and he left for Siberia to begin his engineering career, reconciled to his new life. He began work as a chemical engineer in eastern Siberia.

== Russo-Japanese War ==
Wrangel's life was changed by the outbreak of the Russo-Japanese War in 1904. As a reserve lieutenant, he volunteered for combat duty in the Far East. Along with fifteen other officers from the Horse Guards, he was assigned to the 2nd Argun Cossack Regiment of the Trans-Baikal Cossack Host. During the war, he wrote long, descriptive letters home, which his mother later had published in a historical journal. These letters reveal his keen powers of observation and his feel for the life of a combat officer.

In one of his first actions, he led a scouting party deep into Manchuria to reconnoiter the town of Kindisian. After a perilous night mission, he confirmed the town was clear of large enemy forces. He was awarded his first combat decorations for his bravery during the war. Having found his vocation in soldiering, he decided to stay in military service after the war ended. He was transferred to the 55th Dragoon Regiment, based in Finland.

== Between wars (1905–1914) ==
During the 1905 Russian Revolution, Wrangel was sent with a detachment under General Orlov to the Baltic region to quell nationalist unrest. In 1907, he was temporarily attached to the Horse Guards in St. Petersburg, pending entry to the Nicholas Imperial General Staff Academy. According to his son, his previous indiscretion had been forgotten. During a regimental parade, Tsar Nicholas II, the regiment's honorary commander, noticed the tall officer in a line dragoon uniform with several combat decorations. Upon learning it was Captain Wrangel, the Tsar declared, "I want Captain Wrangel in my regiment." Wrangel became a full-fledged officer of the Horse Guards without the need for a ballot.

Wrangel became known among his fellow officers as "Piper" for his taste for Piper-Heidsieck champagne. In 1908, he married Olga Ivanenko, the daughter of a wealthy Ukrainian landowner. She was a well-educated woman who had trained as a nurse. The couple had four children: Helen, Peter, Nathalie, and later a son, Alexis, born in exile.

Wrangel entered the Staff College, where his previous degree in civil engineering made subjects like mathematics and engineering easy for him. He graduated among the top of his class. In a characteristic move, he turned down the opportunity for a staff position, explaining, "I would be a poor staff officer...I am of too independent a mind!" He returned to a line command in the Horse Guards.

== World War I ==
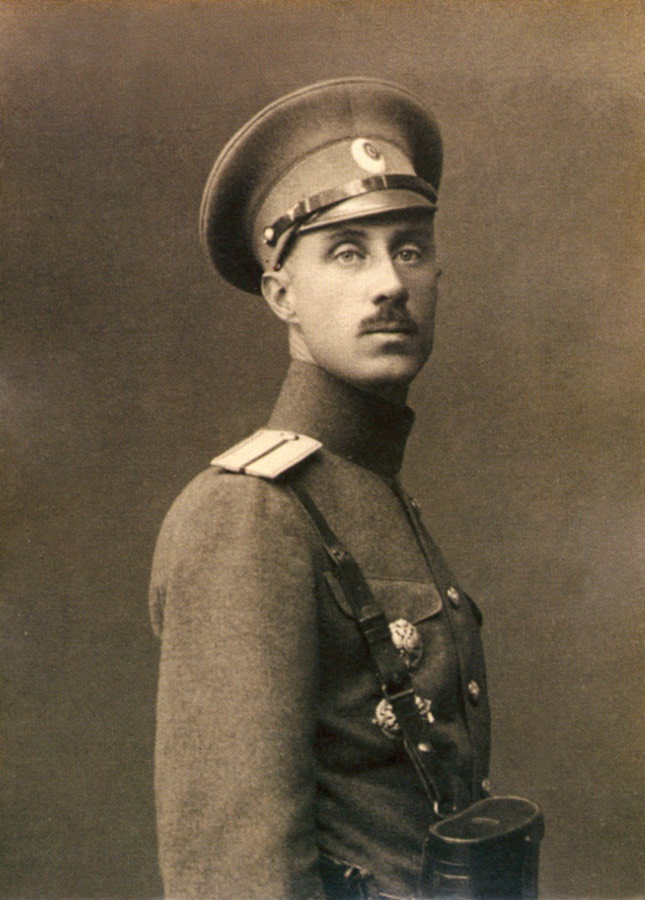
Wrangel c. 1914

At the start of World War I, Wrangel, holding the rank of captain, was given command of a cavalry squadron. On 6 August 1914, his squadron participated in the attack on German positions at Kaushen in East Prussia. The German artillery battery was well-camouflaged and inflicting heavy casualties on the Russian forces. After other officers had been killed, Wrangel took command and led a desperate cavalry charge against the battery. The charge was largely successful, though most of the horses and many of the men were killed by gunfire. Wrangel's own horse was killed under him, but he survived to help capture the two remaining guns. For this act of heroism, he was one of the first Russian officers of the war to be awarded the Order of St. George (4th class).

This action brought him to prominence. In September 1914, he was made Chief of Staff of the Joint Guards Cavalry Division under General Pavel Skoropadsky. In April 1915, he was awarded the St. George Sword and promoted to colonel. He was offered the command of a line cavalry regiment, and to the surprise of many, he requested the Nertchinsk Trans-Baikal Cossack Regiment, with whom he had served in the Russo-Japanese War. He had great respect for the Cossacks' bravery and knew them well. By 1916 he was commanding the Tsarevich's Own Regiment of Nerchinsk Cossacks.

He led the regiment with customary energy. In the Carpathian Mountains, a successful attack earned new rewards: the regiment was awarded silver bugles, a regimental combat award dating from the Napoleonic wars. As a mark of special distinction, Tsarevich Alexei was named honorary chief of the regiment. Wrangel led a deputation from the regiment to St. Petersburg to receive the honors. This led to a period of service as an aide-de-camp to Tsar Nicholas II. During this time, he observed the growing turmoil in the capital and the "presentiment abroad of the nearness of the terrible events".

After returning to the front, Wrangel was promoted to major general and given command of a brigade on the Romanian front.

== Russian Revolution ==
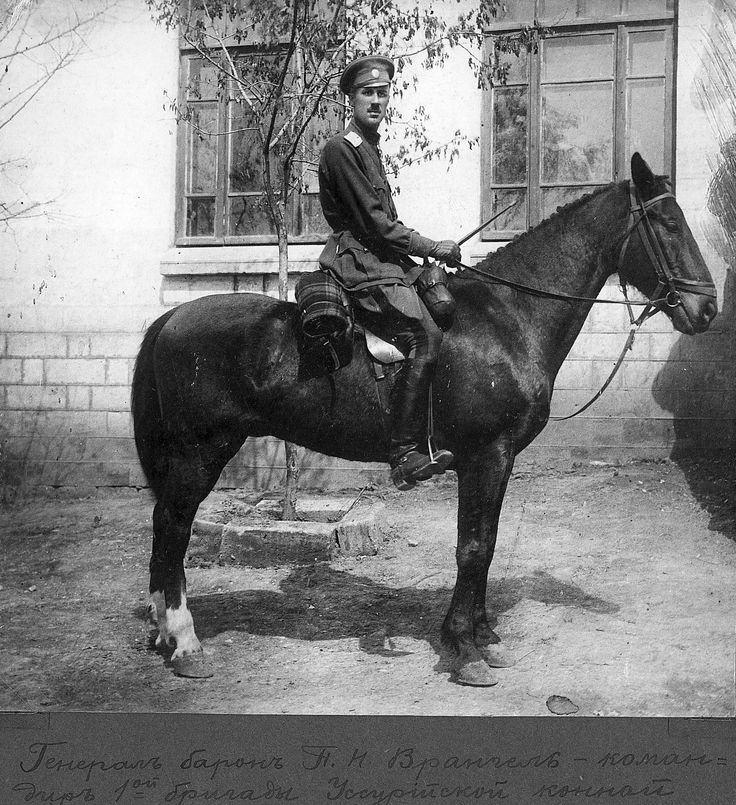
Wrangel in 1917

When news of the Tsar's abdication reached the front in March 1917, Wrangel's divisional commander, General Aleksandr Krymov, a republican, read the manifesto. Wrangel turned to his chief of staff and said: "This is the end of everything — this is anarchy." He believed that the disappearance of the monarchy would lead to the collapse of the army and the nation. After the October Revolution, he left the army and went to his family's villa in Yalta, Crimea.

In early 1918, Yalta was occupied by the Red Army. Wrangel was arrested by Red sailors, along with his wife and her brother. He was nearly executed but was saved by the intervention of his wife, who argued with the sailors, and by a fortuitous circumstance involving his family's laundress and the head of the local revolutionary tribunal. After his release, he went into hiding with his family among the local Tatar population, who were hostile to the Bolsheviks.

== Russian Civil War ==
=== Joining the Volunteer Army ===
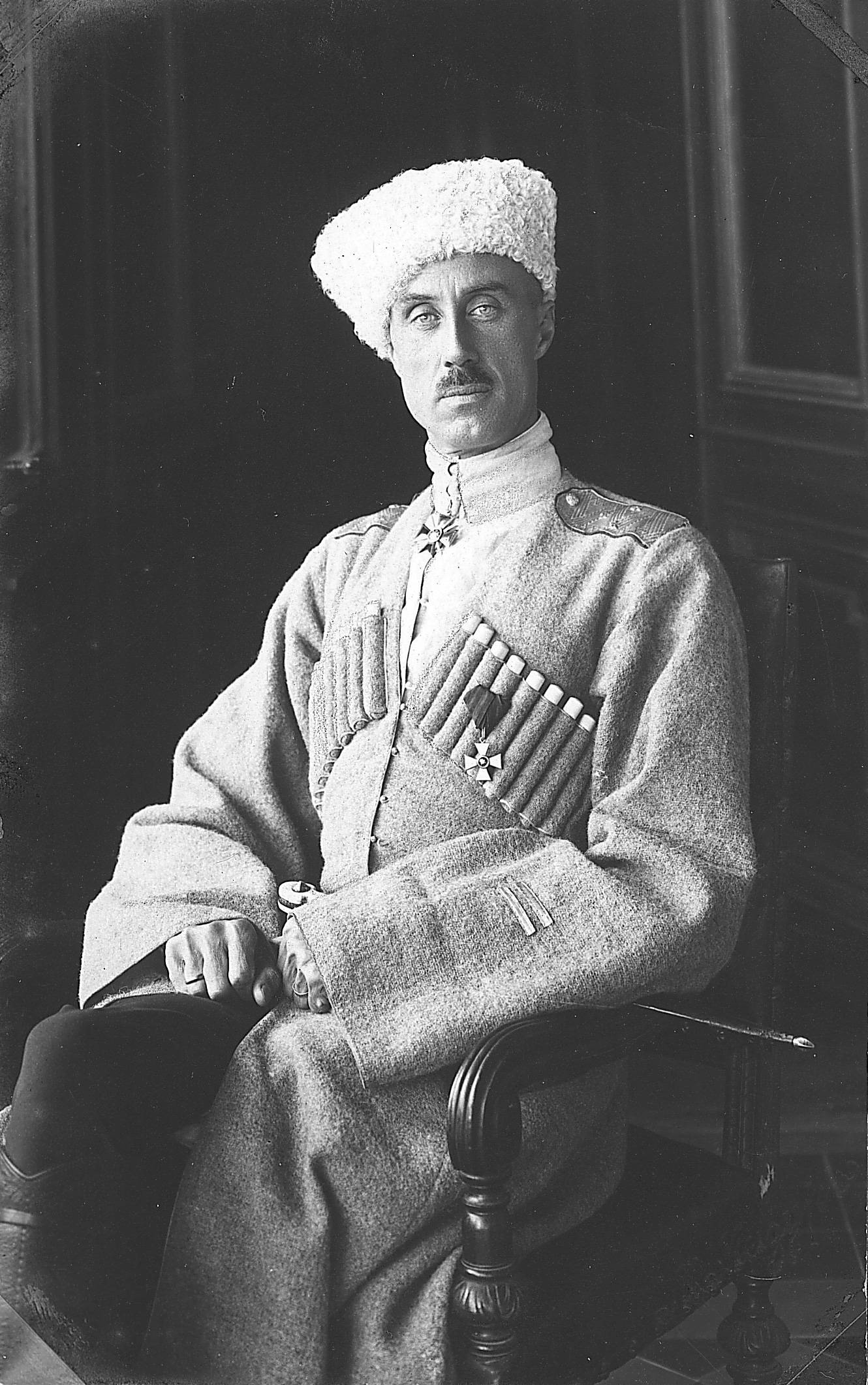
Wrangel in 1920

In August 1918, after German troops had occupied Crimea, Wrangel travelled to Ekaterinodar to join the anti-Bolshevik Volunteer Army. He was given command of the 1st Cavalry Division by General Anton Denikin. The division was small, consisting of only twelve hundred men, with minimal ammunition and equipment, facing Red forces that numbered between twelve and fifteen thousand. Wrangel quickly established a reputation for bold leadership and for reviving the old cavalry tactic of charging in close order ("stirrup to stirrup"), a method that proved surprisingly effective against the less disciplined Red infantry. He had an unpleasant experience in his early days, when his Cossacks broke before a Red cavalry charge and he had to escape by jumping onto a moving ambulance-car. He also became known for his ruthless methods. After capturing a large group of Red Army prisoners, he ordered 370 of their officers and non-commissioned officers shot on the spot. He justified this as letting "those who had misled them take responsibility for their treason", while offering the remaining soldiers the chance to "atone for their crime" by joining the White army. According to Wrangel, this battalion later became one of his best units.

His successes led to his promotion to command the 1st Cavalry Corps. He won a series of victories in the Northern Caucasus, culminating in a decisive victory at the Urup River in October 1918, where his forces routed the Reds, capturing 3,000 prisoners and 23 guns. By the end of 1918, as part of a large-scale reorganization after the Don and Volunteer armies were unified as the Armed Forces of South Russia, Wrangel was given command of the Caucasian Volunteer Army, the main fighting force in the Northern Caucasus.

=== Capture of Tsaritsyn and conflict with Denikin ===
Although an able and distinguished officer, Wrangel was also characterized by contemporaries as "boundlessly vain, ambitious, and given to histrionics and intrigues". In early 1919, a major strategic disagreement emerged between Wrangel and Denikin, reviving a debate that had taken place in May 1918 between Denikin and the Don Ataman Pyotr Krasnov. At a Council of War in late January, Wrangel argued for a concentration of forces to strike north-east against Tsaritsyn (later Stalingrad) to link up with Admiral Alexander Kolchak's White army advancing from Siberia. Denikin, however, insisted on concentrating forces in the Donets Basin to secure its coal resources and create a "jumping-off ground for the attack on Moscow". Denikin's view prevailed. The conference where this was decided sowed the first seeds of discord between the two generals, with Denikin becoming wary of the aristocratic Wrangel.

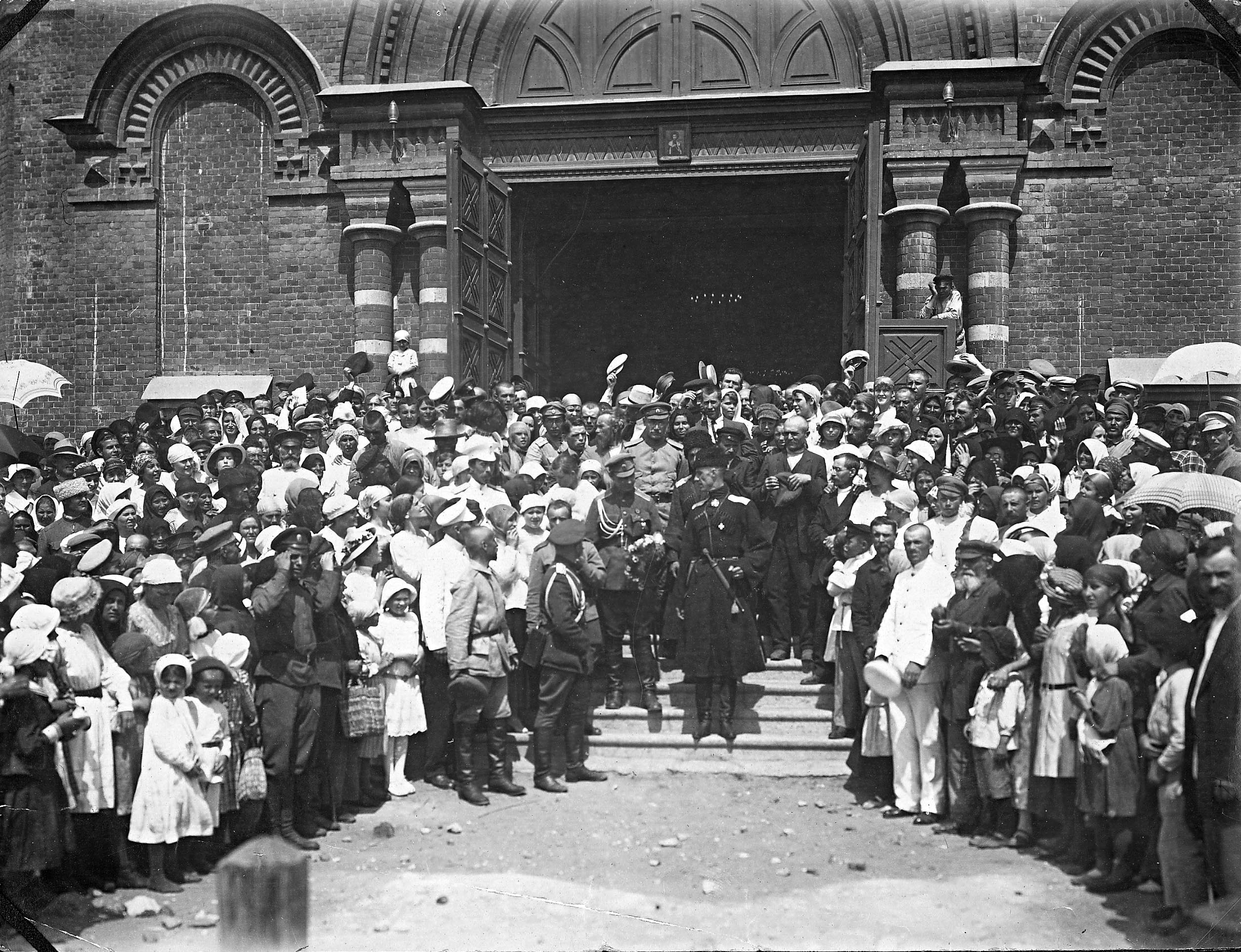
Wrangel heading a victory parade after the capture of Tsaritsyn, 30 June 1919

Despite his objections, Wrangel led the newly formed Caucasian Army towards Tsaritsyn. The campaign was arduous, conducted across a steppe with little water and facing numerically superior Red forces. In June 1919, after a fierce battle, Wrangel's troops stormed and captured the heavily fortified city, a major strategic victory for the White forces. The victory was achieved through a bold plan, using a concentration of forces on one flank and the first coordinated use of tanks and aircraft by the White Army.

Following the victory, Denikin arrived in Tsaritsyn and issued the Moscow Directive. Wrangel again voiced his concerns, calling the plan the "death sentence for the Armies of Southern Russia" and arguing that the army should first secure its gains and link up with Kolchak. Denikin famously replied, "Of course, you want to be the first to enter Moscow!" As Denikin's armies advanced on Moscow, Wrangel's forces on the Volga flank were left with few reinforcements and faced mounting Red pressure. He successfully defended Tsaritsyn against four successive Red Army assaults but was eventually forced to retreat. The ever-increasing rivalry with Denikin became public and harmed the White movement. Wrangel attacked Denikin for his perceived weakness and indecisiveness, and his failure to impose order in the rear. In December 1919, after a series of military setbacks, Wrangel was dismissed from his command and went into exile in Constantinople.

== Commander-in-Chief ==
=== Government of South Russia ===
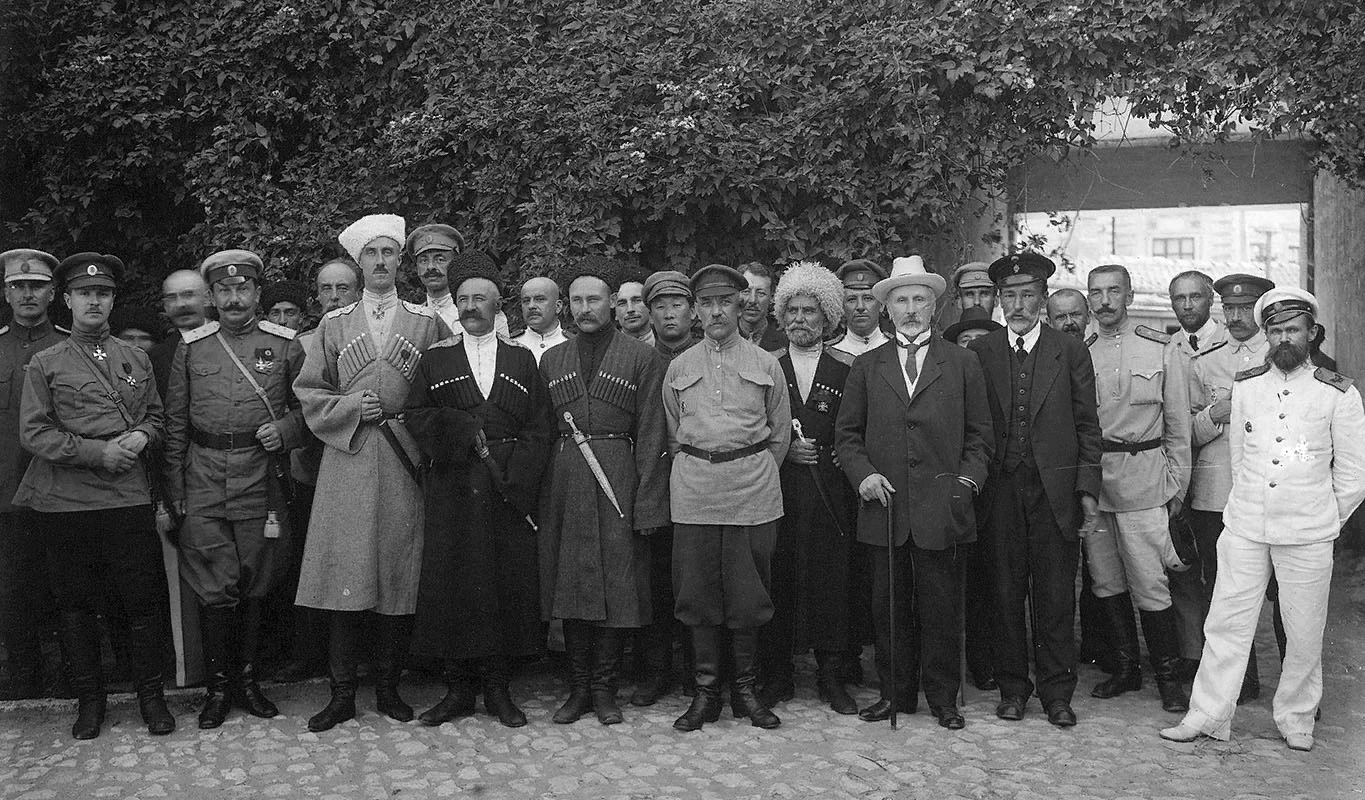
Wrangel (front row, third from left) with Cossack atamans and members of the Government of South Russia, July 1920

In March 1920, following the disastrous defeat of the Volunteer Army and its chaotic evacuation from Novorossiysk, Denikin resigned. On 4 April, a military council elected Wrangel as the new Commander-in-Chief of the Armed Forces of Southern Russia. He took command of a demoralized and shattered force, now confined to the Crimean peninsula, at a time when many, including the British, considered the White cause lost. Admiral John de Robeck, the British High Commissioner, informed him that British aid would cease. Wrangel's response was resolute: "If I am chosen, it is my duty to accept the command."

Wrangel reorganized the remnants into a disciplined fighting force, which he renamed the "Russian Army" to distance it from the now-unpopular Volunteer Army and emphasize its national character. He established a new civilian government, the Government of South Russia, bringing in experienced administrators like Alexander Krivoshein, a former minister under Stolypin, and the liberal intellectual Peter Struve. His government embarked on an ambitious program of reforms, described by his foreign minister Struve as an attempt "to make leftist policy with rightist hands". This program included a sweeping land reform, which recognized the peasants' ownership of land they had seized in 1917 while providing for compensation to the original landowners. It was the most radical land reform ever proposed by a White leader. He also implemented policies to address workers' grievances, combat corruption, and grant autonomy to the Cossacks. Unlike his predecessors, he did not believe that the people would support the Whites out of a sense of duty, but rather that the Whites had to create conditions that would generate such support. Despite these measures, the land reform was too complex and was implemented too late to win over the peasantry, who remained deeply distrustful of the White government and expected the land for free from the Bolsheviks.

=== Defeat and evacuation ===
In June 1920, Wrangel launched his last major offensive, the Northern Taurida Operation. His forces broke out of the Crimean bottleneck and captured a large territory to the north. This success was aided by the diversion of Red Army forces to the Polish–Soviet War. However, after Poland signed an armistice with the Soviets in October, the Red Army concentrated overwhelming forces against Wrangel. An amphibious landing in the Kuban in August to raise a Cossack uprising failed disastrously. In late October, the vastly outnumbered Russian Army was forced back into Crimea after a fierce fighting retreat across the Taurida.

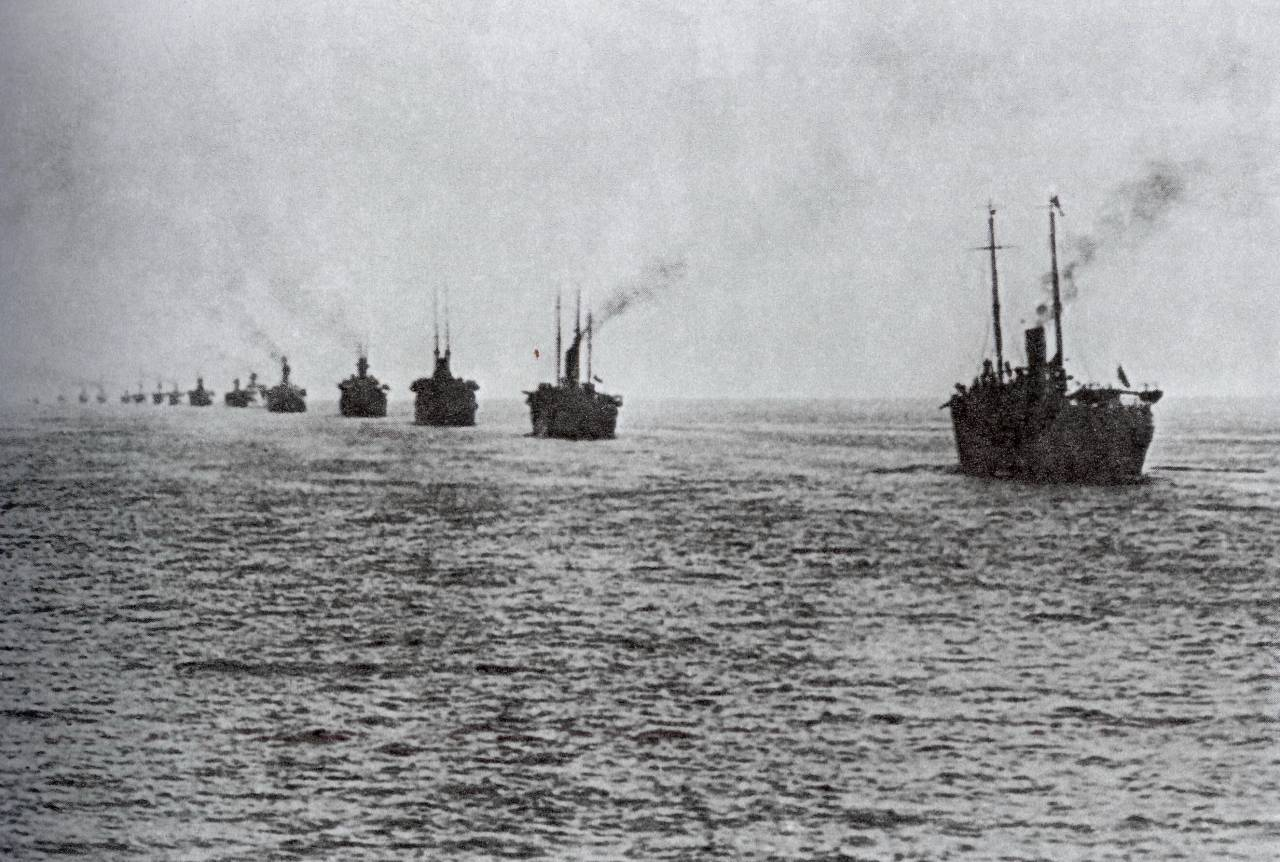
Departure of Wrangel's fleet from Crimea, 1920

Facing certain defeat, Wrangel organized a mass evacuation, for which he had been preparing since August. In a final proclamation before leaving, he stated, "The Army, which has shed its blood in great torrents in fighting, not only for the Russian cause, but for the whole world, is now leaving its native shores, abandoned by everybody...We have the right to claim help from those who owe their continued freedom and even their continued existence to us; we have sacrificed much for their cause." On 14 November 1920, 126 ships evacuated 145,693 soldiers and civilians from the ports of Crimea, without a single casualty. The evacuation was far more successful than Denikin's from Novorossiysk. This fleet, later known as Wrangel's fleet, sailed to Constantinople, marking the end of the White struggle in Southern Russia.

== Life in exile ==
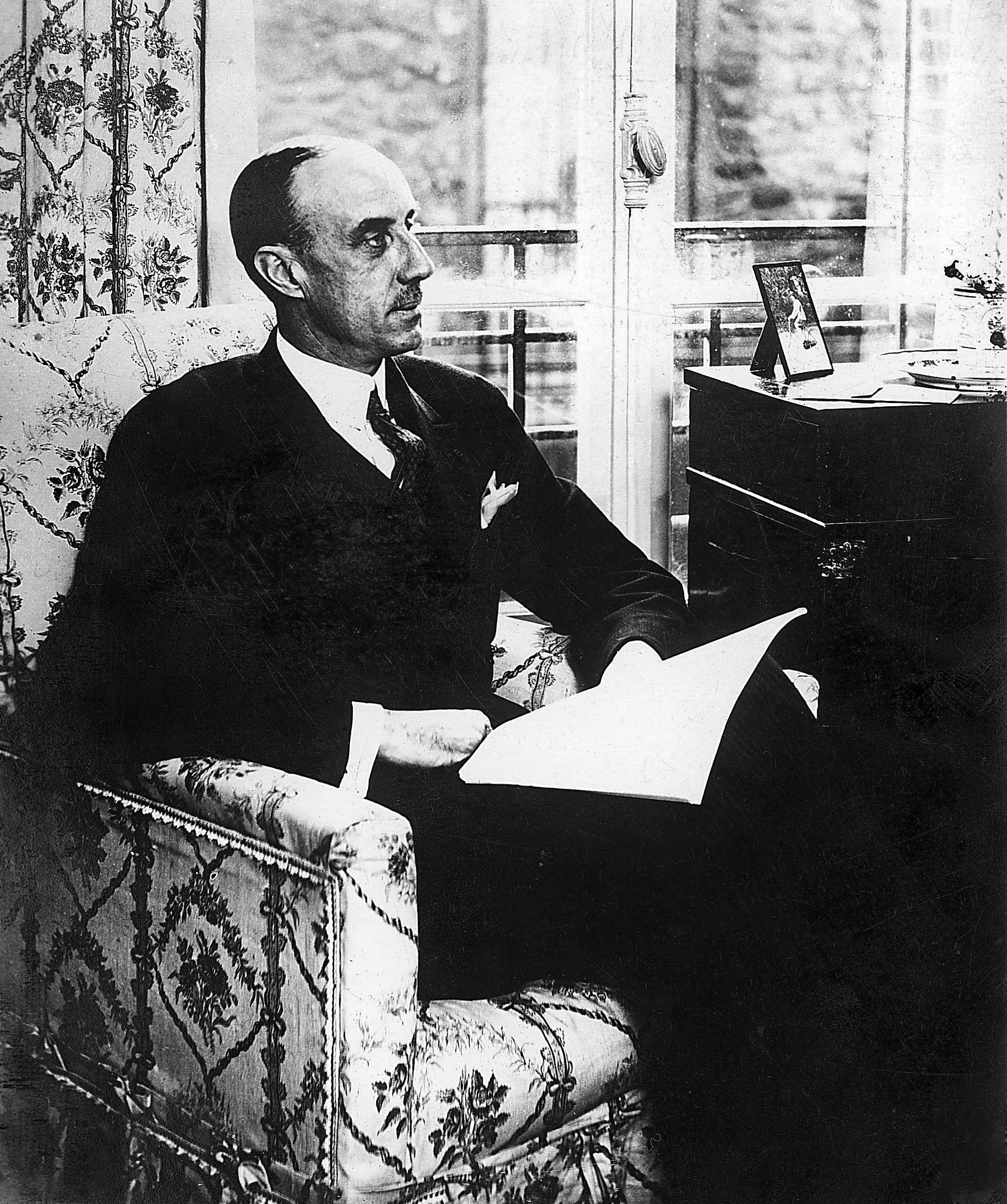
Wrangel in Paris, 1927

After the evacuation, Wrangel and his army were interned in camps, primarily in Gallipoli and on the island of Lemnos. Despite extreme hardship, starvation, and pressure from the French government to disband, Wrangel kept the army's morale and organization intact. His staff was based on his yacht, the Lucullus, in Constantinople. On 15 October 1921, the Lucullus was rammed and sunk by an Italian freighter sailing from a Soviet port; Wrangel and his family were ashore at the time, but the incident was widely seen as a Soviet assassination attempt.

The army was eventually resettled in Yugoslavia and Bulgaria. In 1924, to unite all Russian military émigrés and continue the anti-Bolshevik struggle, Wrangel established the Russian All-Military Union (ROVS). He remained its leader for the rest of his life. He spent his final years with his family in Brussels, living modestly and continuing to lead the White movement through voluminous correspondence.

== Death and legacy ==
Wrangel died suddenly in Brussels in 1928, after a short and severe illness. His family and supporters believed that he had been poisoned by a Soviet agent. According to historian Richard Luckett, it is "probable that Wrangel died a natural death – of an illness brought on by overwork". His last words were reportedly, "Lord save the Army".

In 1929, in accordance with his last wishes, his remains were transported to Yugoslavia. After a state funeral in Belgrade attended by King Alexander I and representatives of the Russian émigré community, he was buried in the Russian Holy Trinity Church.

Wrangel is remembered as the last commander of the White Army and a central figure of the Russian Civil War. Historian Peter Kenez described him as a "more able politician, diplomat, and general" than his predecessor Denikin, who possessed charisma and enacted a more realistic and enlightened policy. However, Kenez also argues that Wrangel assumed command when "the White cause was already lost" and that his personal mistakes, such as delaying the withdrawal from Northern Taurida, did not ultimately influence the outcome of the struggle. For Wrangel, a key objective during his command was to lead his army out of a "hopeless position without loss of honour". His supporters believe that in this, he succeeded in redeeming the honour of the Imperial Russian Army from which the White movement had sprung. His family motto, Rumpo non plecto ("I break, I do not yield"), has often been seen as representative of his character and his role in the White struggle. Wrangel published his memoirs in Always with Honor: The Memoirs of General Wrangel.

== Family ==
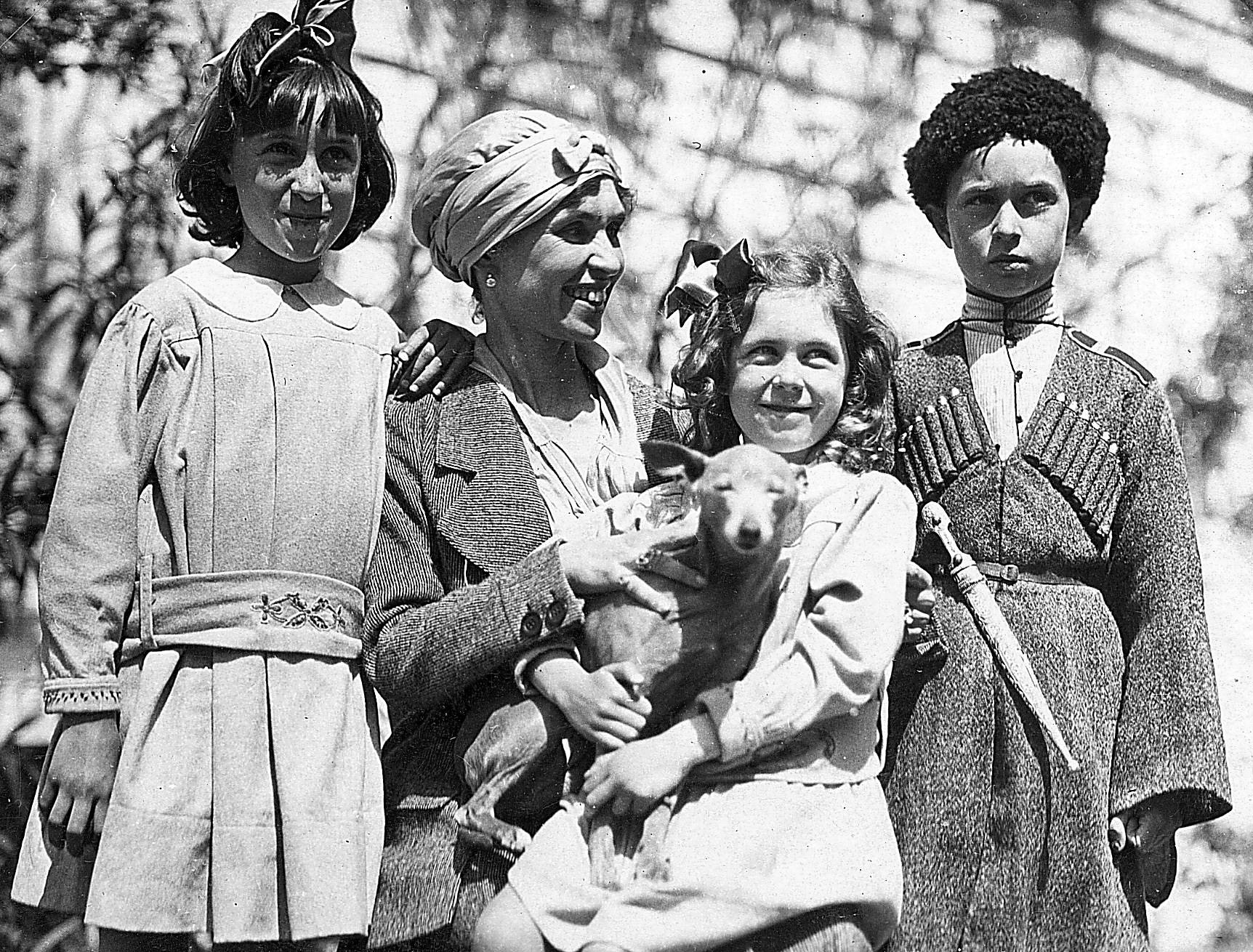
Wrangel's wife and children in 1920. From left to right: Helena, Olga, Nathalie, and Peter.

He was married to Russian noblewoman Olga Mikhailovna Ivanienko (1886 Saint Petersburg - 1968 New York). They had two sons and two daughters:

- Baroness Helena Petrovna Wrangel (1909–1999); married Baron Fedor Meyendorff von Uexküll: married secondly to Phillip Hills; had issue
- Baron Peter Petrovich Wrangel (27 January 1911 Saint Petersburg, Russia – 24 October 1999 Southampton, Suffolk County, New York, United States) no issue
- Baroness Nathalie Petrovna Wrangel (11 October 1913 Saint Petersburg, Russia – 9 August 2013, Cos Cob, Connecticut, United States); married to Alexis George Basilevski, a Russian nobleman and had issue
- Baron Alexis Petrovich Wrangel (7 July 1922, Serbia – 27 May 2005 County Meath, Republic of Ireland); married to Ekaterina Nikolaevna von Lambsdorff; no issue

His nephew, Baron George Wrangell, became known by the David Ogilvy-created 1951 ad campaign for the Hathaway shirt company in which he was depicted in photos as "a white-shirted, debonair-looking fellow" with a black patch over his right eye, although both his eyes were "perfectly good."

== Honours ==
- Order of St. Anne 4th class, 4 July 1904
- Order of St. Anne 3rd class, 9 May 1906
- Order of St. Stanislaus 3rd class, with swords and bow, 6 January 1906.
- Order of St. Stanislaus 2nd class, 6 December 1912
- Order of St. George, 4th class, 13 October 1914
- Order of St Vladimir, 4th class with swords and bow, 24 October 1914
- Golden Sword of St George "for courage", 10 June 1915
- Order of St Vladimir, 3rd class with swords, 8 December 1915
- Cross of St. George, 4th class, 24 July 1917
- Order of Saint Nicholas Thaumaturgus, 2nd degree
- Papal Order of the Holy Sepulchre of Jerusalem, 1920

== Works ==
- Wrangel, Pyotr N. (1963) [1958]. Always with Honour [memoirs of General Wrangel]. New York: R. Speller. OCLC 600910469.
  - Republished by Ls Press in 2022: ISBN 978-7-250-36444-1.
  - Republished by Passage Classics: ISBN 979-8695956818.

== See also ==
- German Ivanovich Konovalov
- List of unsolved deaths
- White Army, Black Baron
