= Evacuation of the Crimea =

November 1920 evacuation of the Russian Army

Evacuation of Crimea
- Part of the Southern Front of the Russian Civil War
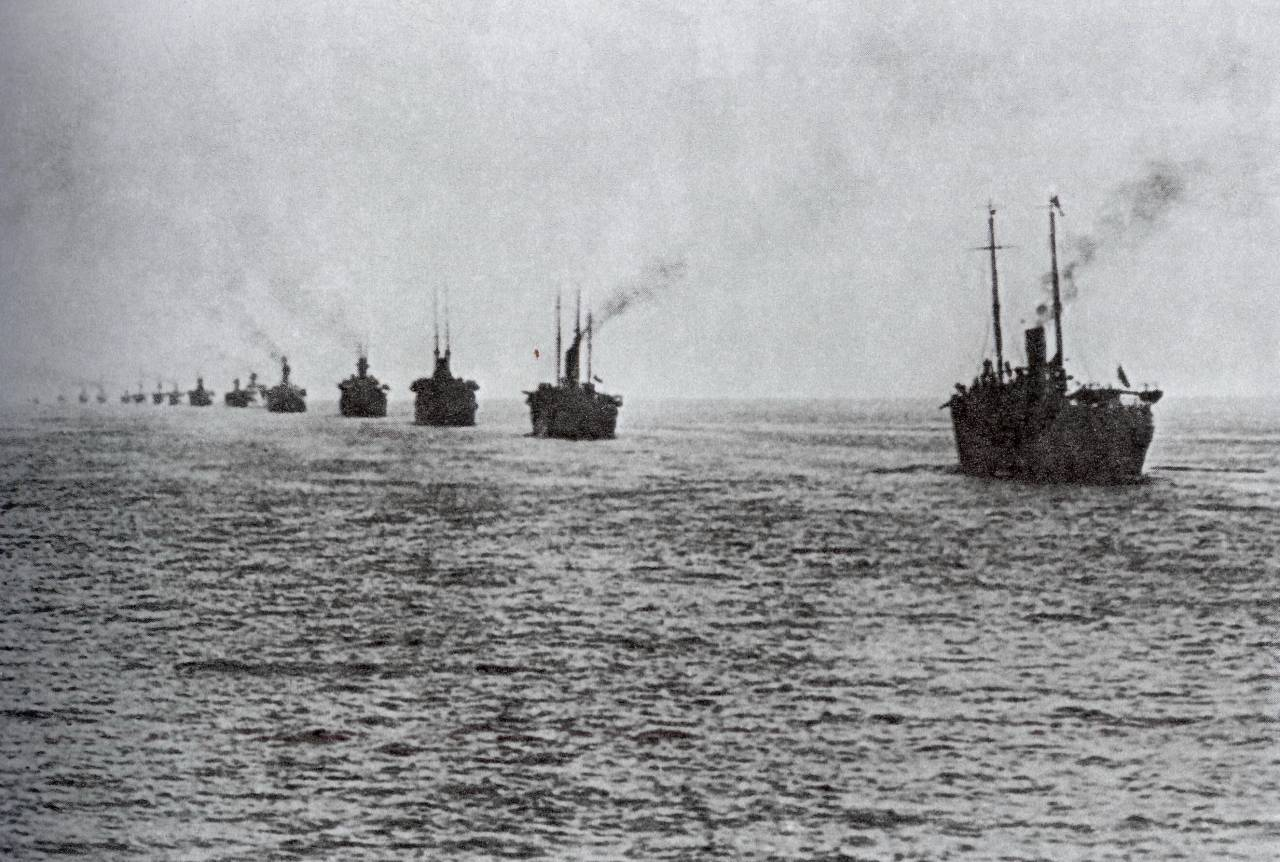
- Evacuation of Pyotr Wrangel's Russian Army from Crimea
- Type: Emergency evacuation
- Location: Crimea, South Russia
- Planned by: Russian Army
- Commanded by: Pyotr Wrangel
- Objective: Evacuation of Russian soldiers and civilians to Constantinople
- Date: November 13–16, 1920
- Executed by: Russian Squadron
- Outcome: Evacuation successful: Crimea occupied by the Red Army; Mass reprisals against civilian population, knowns as the Red Terror; Establishment of the Crimean ASSR as part of the Russian SFSR

The Evacuation of the Crimea (November 13–16, 1920) was an event in the Russian Civil War, in which the Government of South Russia evacuated over sea from the Crimean Peninsula, the last stronghold of the White movement on the Southern Front, bringing an end to the fighting on that Front.

== The Evacuation ==
During the occupation of Crimea by the Crimean Soviet Army under the command of Pavel Dybenko in April 1919, the Entente troops were evacuated from Sevastopol, taking with them a number of refugees, including some of the leaders of the Second Crimean Regional Government of Solomon Krym. White Army units retreated to the Kerch Peninsula and held it. Initially, the Crimean Socialist Soviet Republic and its leaders Dmitry Ulyanov pursued a relatively soft policy in comparison with the atrocities of the winter of 1917-1918 and were able to avoid mass terror.

However, by the end of October 1920, the White Army had been driven out of Southern Russia and Ukraine, and only held the Crimean Peninsula, defended behind the narrow Perekop Isthmus. When this last defensive line was breached by the Red Army during the Siege of Perekop, the commander of the White Army, Pyotr Wrangel, decided to evacuate. The operation had been preliminarily worked out and planned by General Wrangel's staff, so its implementation was carried out in good order.

During the evacuation from the ports of the Crimean peninsula (Sevastopol, Yevpatoria, Kerch, Feodosia, Yalta) a total of 145,693 soldiers and civilians, not counting the crews, were taken on board on 126 ships and "sudenosheks" (small boats and tugs).

This fleet, known as Wrangel's fleet and composed of ships of the Whites' Black Sea fleet, foreign ships, and the temporarily mobilized ships of the Voluntary Fleet, first sailed to Entente-occupied Constantinople. A significant number of the passengers left the ships here, replenishing the ranks of White Russian emigres. Between December 8, 1920, and February 1921, the reduced flotilla sailed to the Tunisian port of Bizerte.

The soldiers and civilians who were left behind in the Crimea suffered under the Red Terror organised by Béla Kun and Rosalia Zemlyachka, under the general management of the representative of the Russian Soviet government, Yuri Pyatakov, and authorised by Vladimir Lenin.

The estimated number of executions vary from minimum 12,000 over 50,000 to 120,000. The White Army soldiers had been falsely promised amnesty if they surrendered.

Several rare photographs of the moment of evacuation in Sevastopol and Yalta have been preserved. The Crimean Evacuation is also shown in Soviet feature films "Two Comrades Were Serving" (1968) and "The Flight" (1970), and also in the 2014 film "Sunstroke" .

== Photographs ==
Scenes of evacuation in the ports
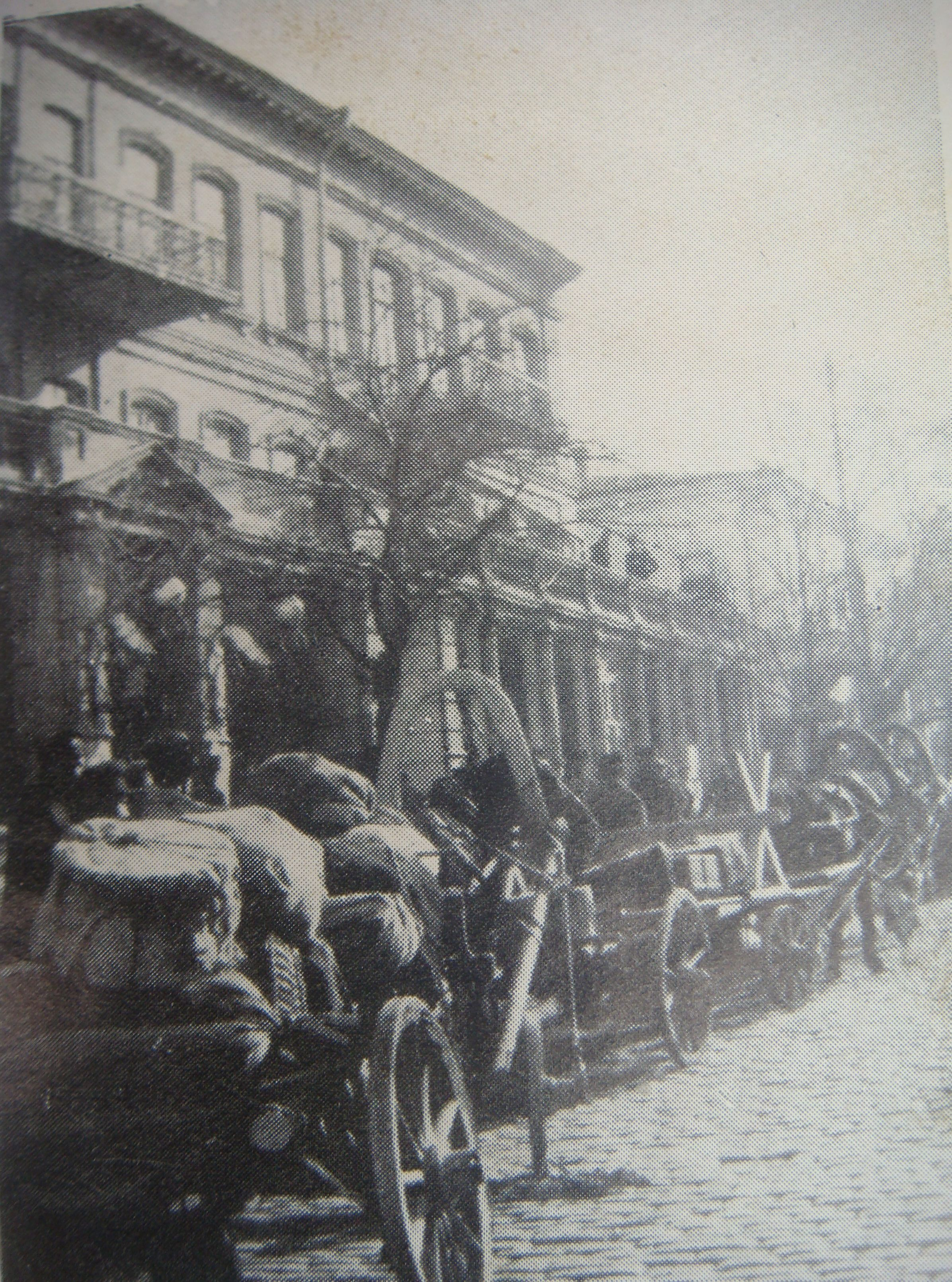
Evacuation line of civilians in Crimea

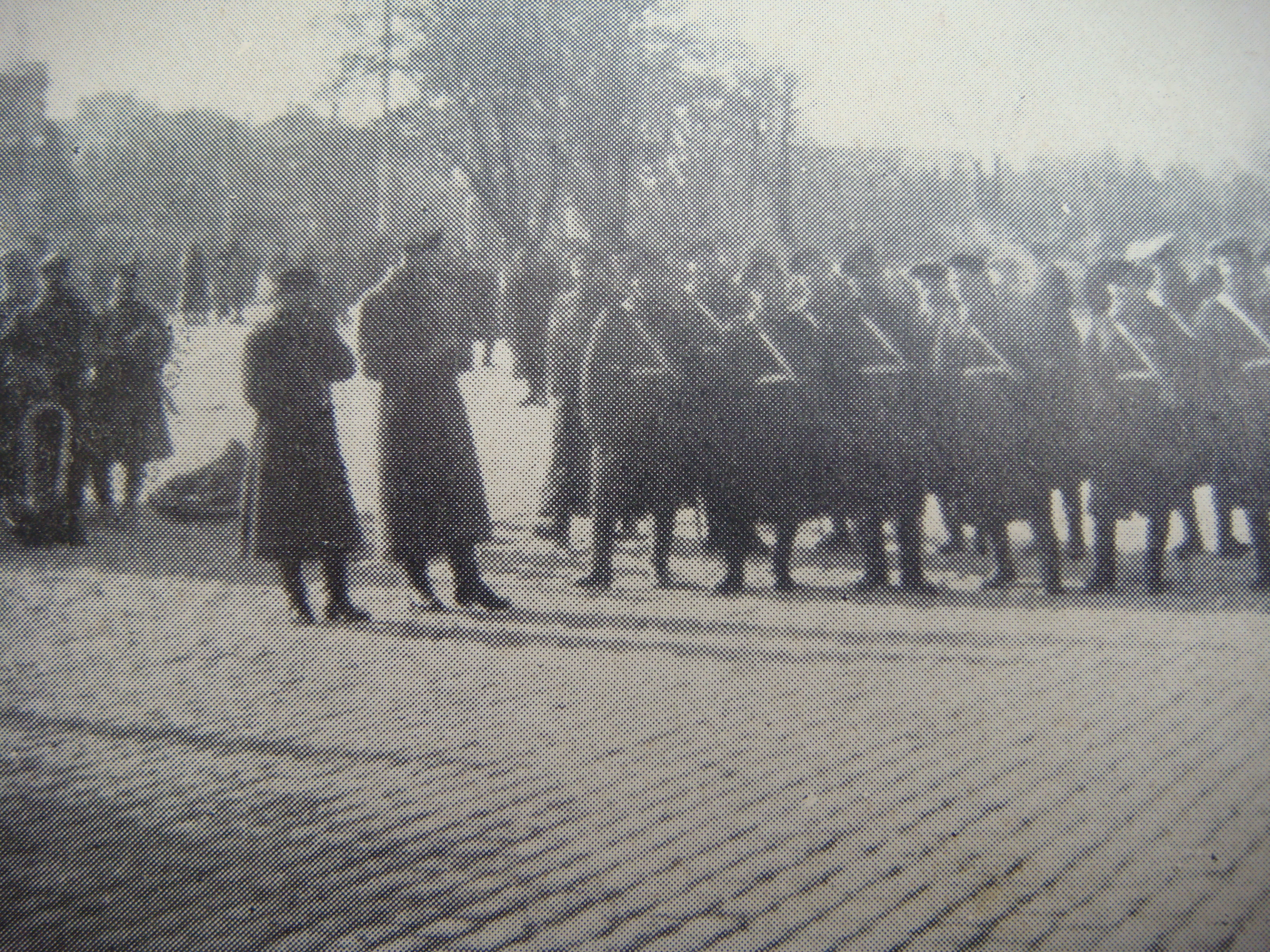
Final departure of Russian troops from Crimea

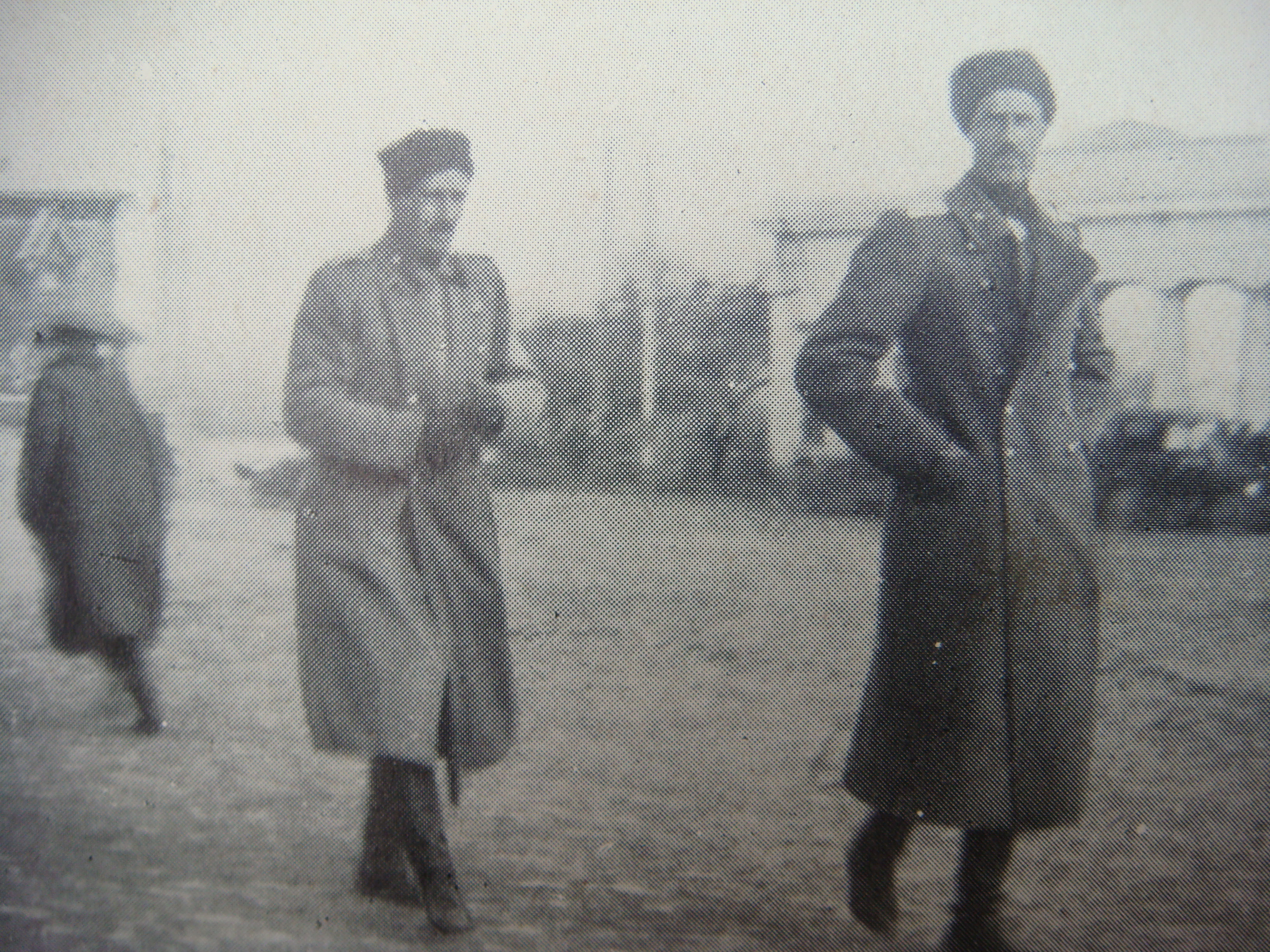
Evacuation of Pyotr Wrangel from Sevastopol

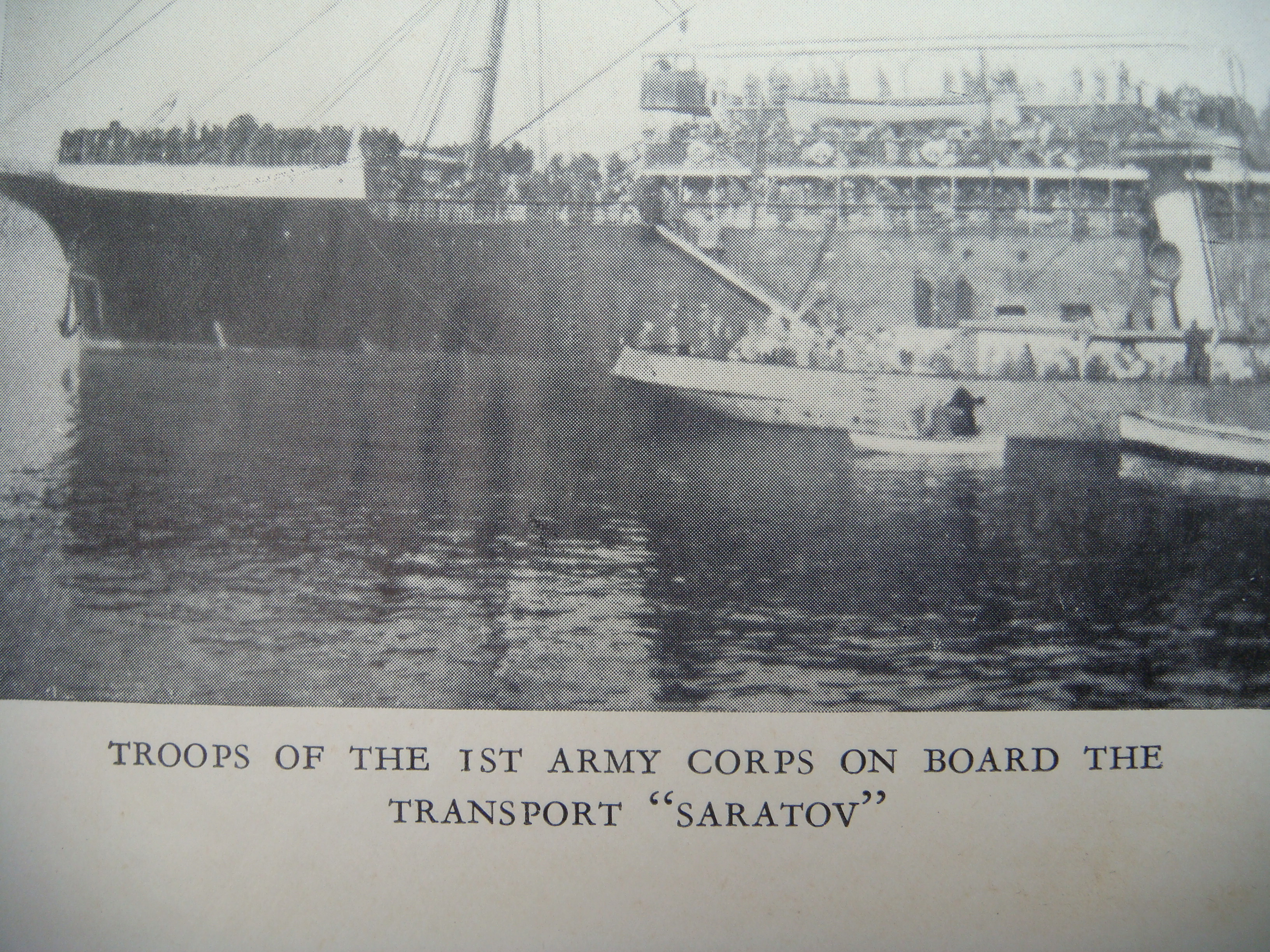
Troops of the 1st Army Corps evacuating on the Saratov transport ship

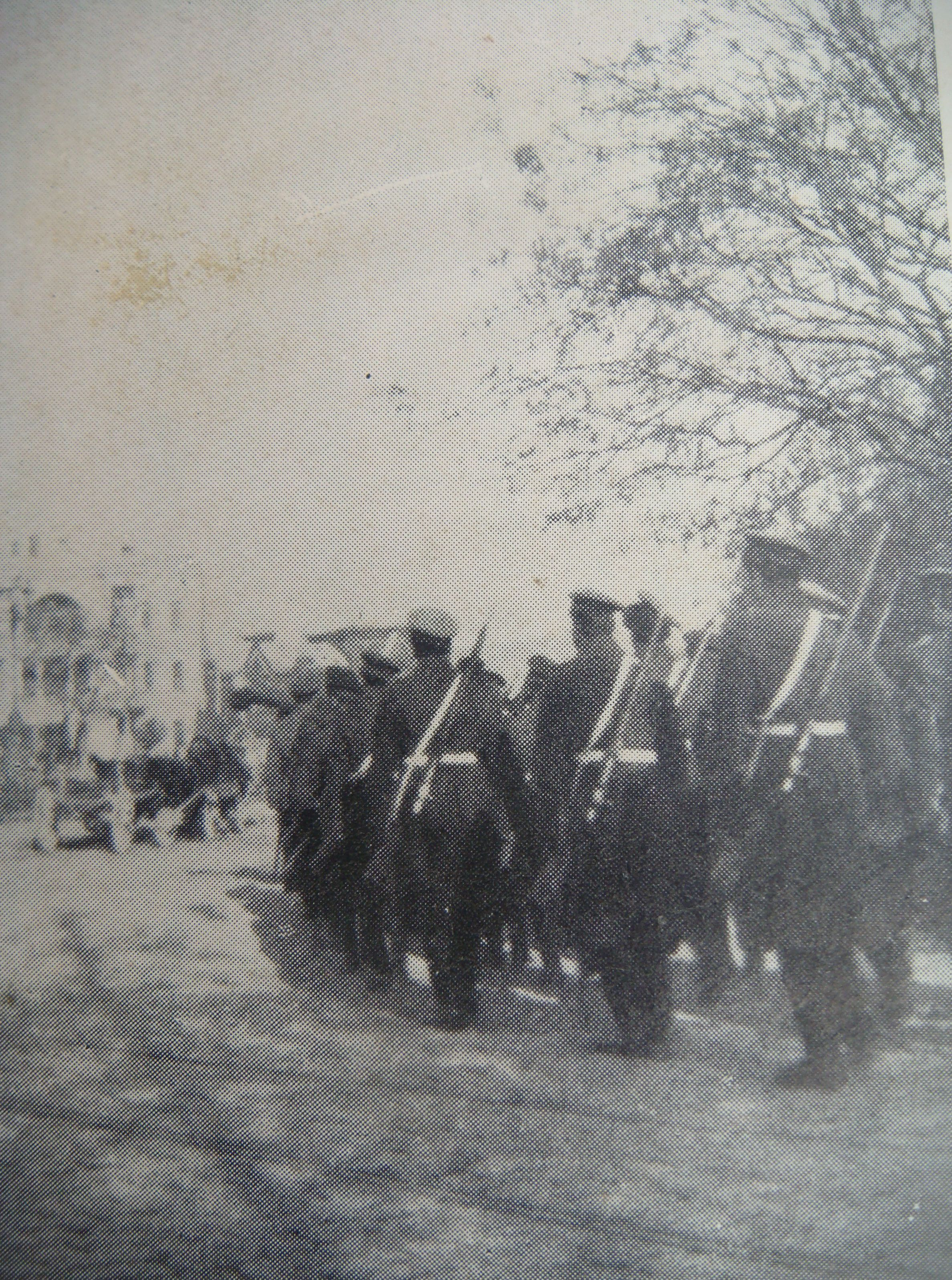
Last patrol of Crimea by Russian Army troops

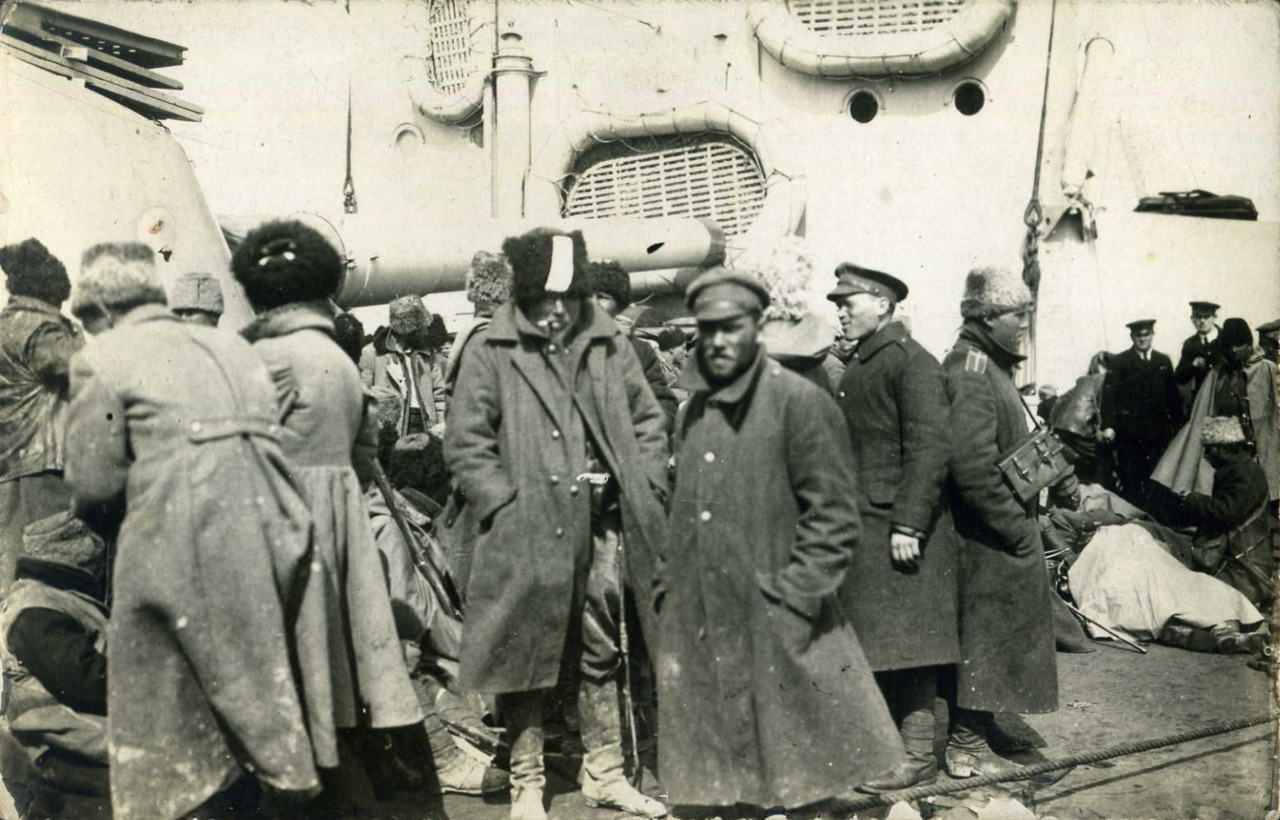
The Evacuation of Wrangel's White Army from Crimea in November 1920
Out to sea
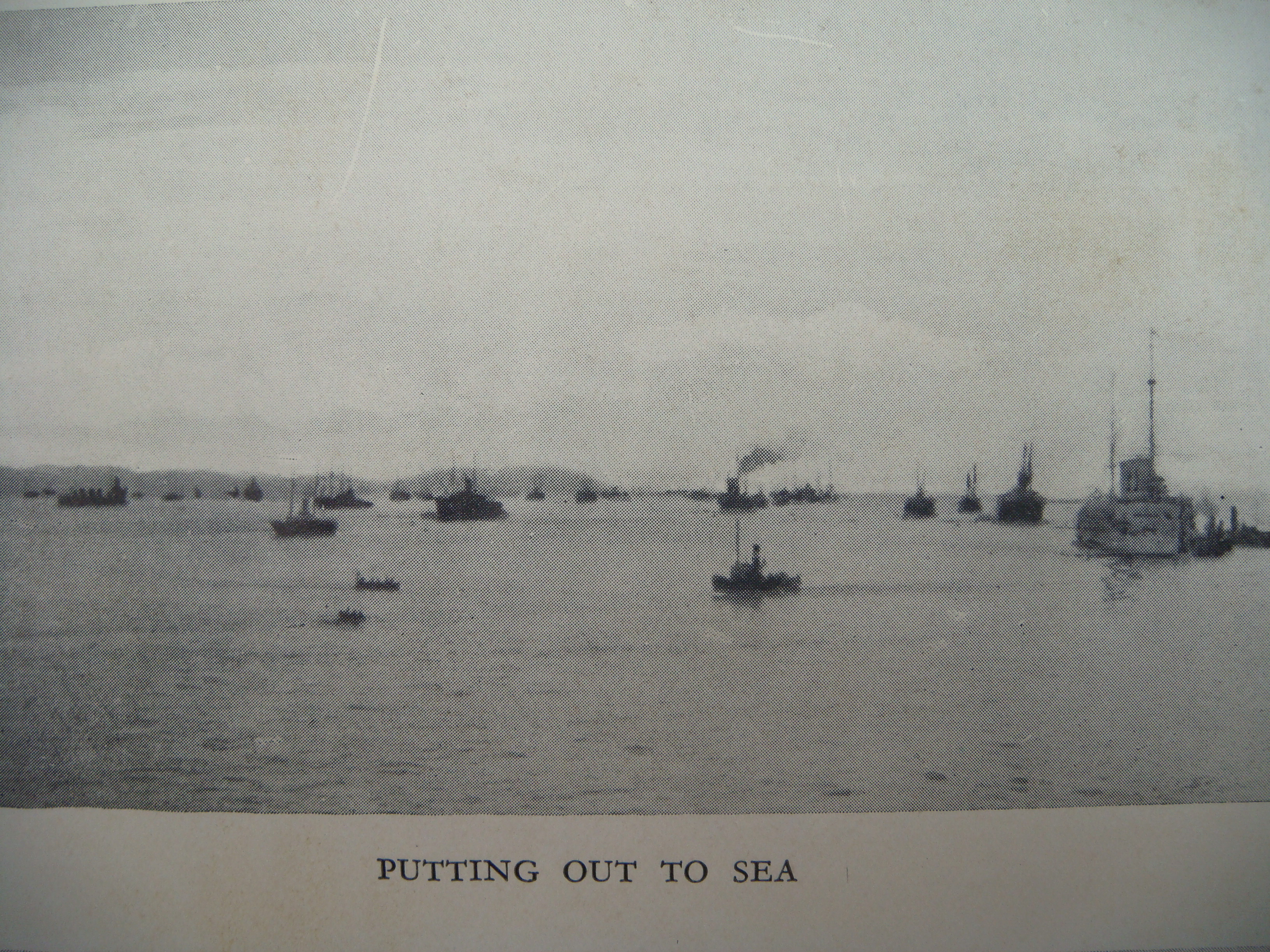
Russian fleet heading out to sea

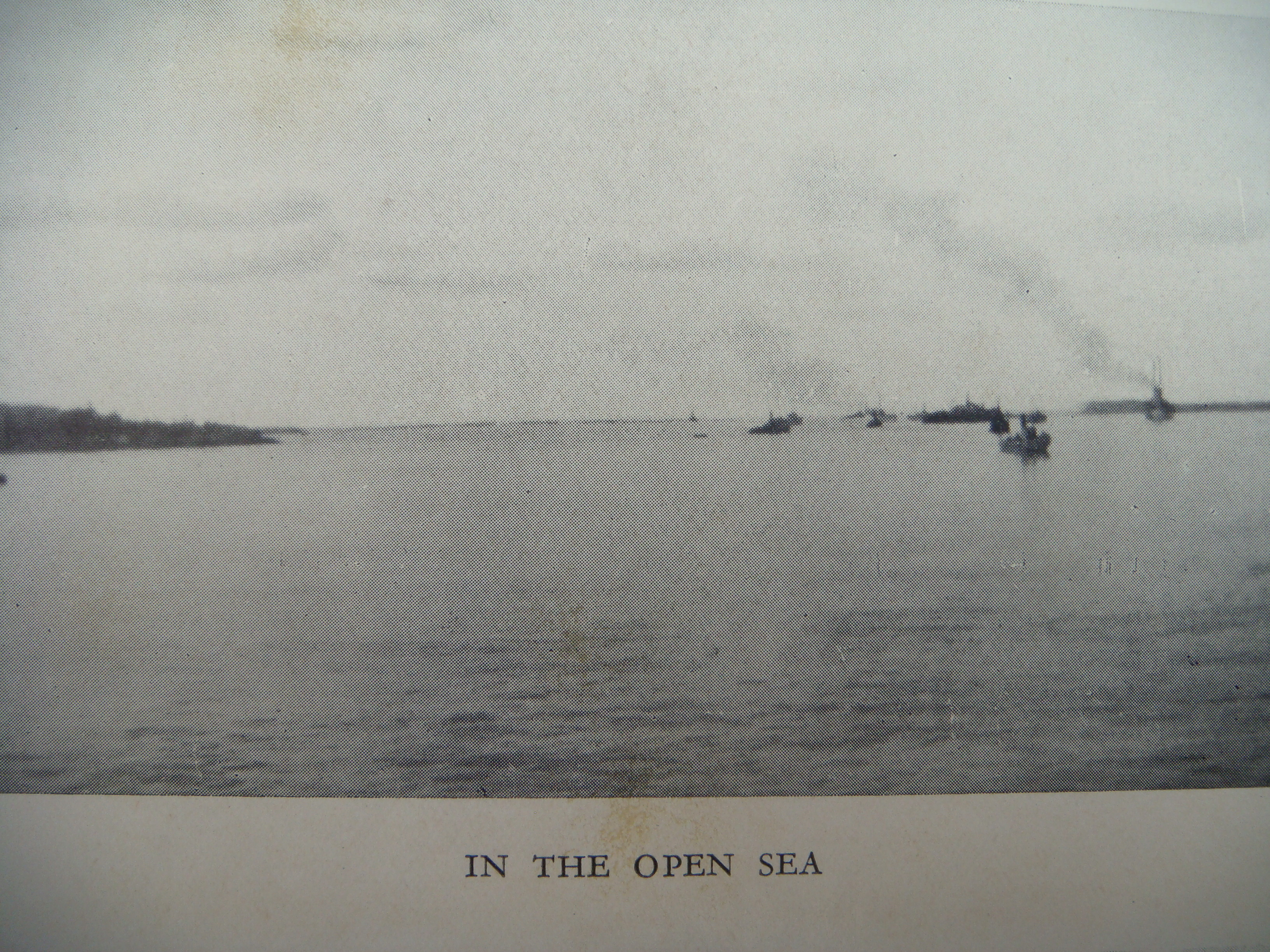
Russian fleet in the open sea

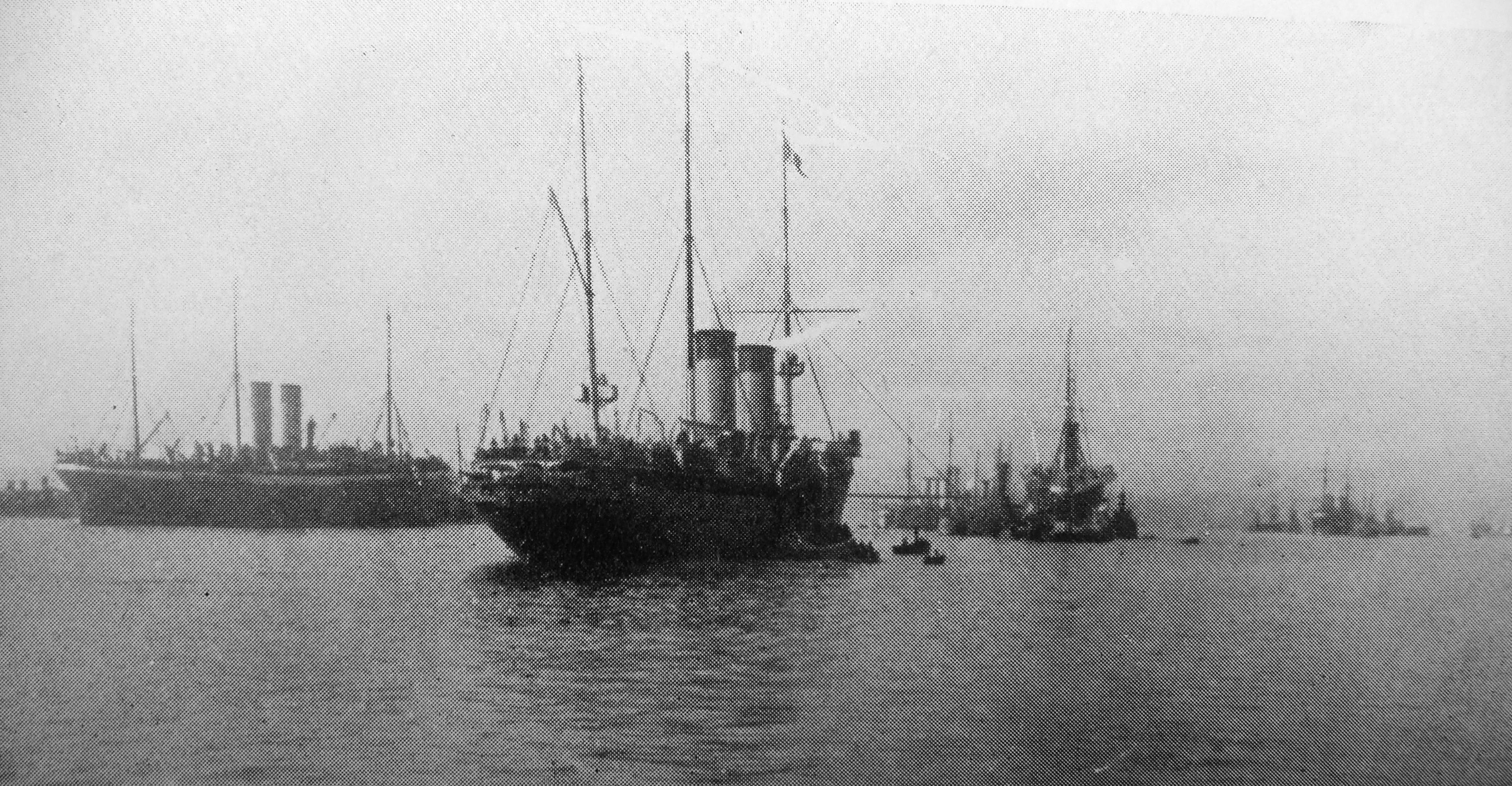
Russian fleet in the Bosporus

Russian Army on a ship leaving Crimea

== See also ==
- Bibliography of the Russian Revolution and Civil War
- Outline of the Russian Revolution and Civil War
- Index of articles related to the Russian Revolution and Civil War
- The "Russian" Civil Wars, 1916–1926: Ten Years That Shook the World
- Russia in Flames: War, Revolution, Civil War, 1914–1921
- Russia in Revolution: An Empire in Crisis, 1890 to 1928
- Russia: Revolution and Civil War, 1917—1921
- The Russian Revolution: A New History
