= History of Crimea =

Recorded history of the Crimean peninsula

Ancient settlements in Crimea and surrounding area

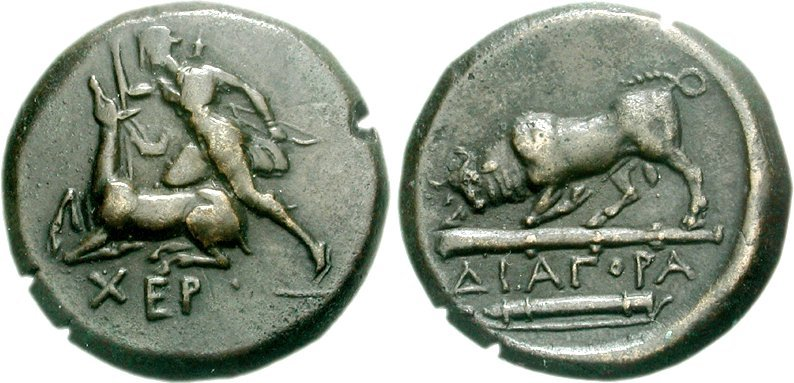
Coin from Chersonesus with Artemis, deer, bull, club and quiver (c. 300 BC)

The recorded history of the Crimean Peninsula, historically known as Tauris, Taurica (Greek: Ταυρική or Ταυρικά), and the Tauric Chersonese (Greek: Χερσόνησος Ταυρική, "Tauric Peninsula"), begins around the 5th century BCE when several Greek colonies were established along its coast, the most important of which was Chersonesos near modern-day Sevastopol, with Scythians and Tauri in the hinterland to the north. The southern coast gradually consolidated into the Bosporan Kingdom, which was later annexed by Pontus and eventually became a client kingdom of Rome (63 BC onward). Under Roman and later Byzantine rule, the region remained culturally Greek for nearly two millennia, continuing through the Empire of Trebizond (1204–1461) and the independent Principality of Theodoro (until 1475). In the 13th century, some Crimean port cities were controlled by the Venetians and by the Genovese, but the interior was much less stable, enduring a long series of conquests and invasions. In the medieval period, it was partially conquered by Kievan Rus' whose prince Vladimir the Great was baptised at Chersonesus Cathedral, which marked the beginning of the Christianization of Kievan Rus'. During the Mongol invasion of Europe, the north and centre of Crimea fell to the Mongol Golden Horde, and in the 1440s the Crimean Khanate formed out of the collapse of the horde but quite rapidly itself became subject to the Ottoman Empire, which also conquered the coastal areas which had kept independent of the Khanate. A major source of prosperity in these times was frequent raids into Russia for slaves for the Crimean slave trade.

In 1774, the Ottoman Empire was defeated by Catherine the Great. After two centuries of conflict, the Russian fleet had destroyed the Ottoman navy and the Russian army had inflicted heavy defeats on the Ottoman land forces. The ensuing Treaty of Küçük Kaynarca forced the Sublime Porte to recognize the Tatars of the Crimea as politically independent. Catherine the Great's incorporation of the Crimea in 1783 from the defeated Ottoman Empire into the Russian Empire increased Russia's power in the Black Sea area. The Crimea was the first Muslim territory to slip from the sultan's suzerainty. The Ottoman Empire's frontiers would gradually shrink, and Russia would proceed to push her frontier westwards to the Dniester. From 1853 to 1856, the strategic position of the peninsula in controlling the Black Sea meant that it was the site of the principal engagements of the Crimean War, where Russia lost to a French-led alliance.

During the Russian Civil War, Crimea changed hands many times and was where Wrangel's anti-Bolshevik White Army made their last stand in 1920, with tens of thousands of those who remained being murdered as part of the Red Terror. In 1921, the Crimean ASSR was created as an autonomous republic of the Russian SFSR. During World War II, Crimea was occupied by Germany until 1944. The ASSR was downgraded to an oblast within the Russian SFSR in 1945 following the ethnic cleansing of the Crimean Tatars by the Soviet regime, and in 1954, Crimea was transferred to the Ukrainian SSR as part of celebrations of the 300th anniversary of the Treaty of Pereyaslav, called the "reunification of Ukraine with Russia" in the USSR.

Following the dissolution of the Soviet Union, the Republic of Crimea was formed in 1992, although the republic was abolished in 1995, with the Autonomous Republic of Crimea established firmly under Ukrainian authority and Sevastopol being administered as a city with special status. A 1997 treaty partitioned the Soviet Black Sea Fleet, ending the protracted Black Sea Fleet dispute and allowing Russia to continue basing its Black Sea fleet in Sevastopol with the lease extended in 2010. Crimea's status is disputed. In 2014, Crimea saw intense demonstrations against the removal of the Ukrainian president Viktor Yanukovych culminating in pro-Russian forces occupying strategic points in Crimea and the Republic of Crimea declared independence from Ukraine following a disputed referendum supporting reunification. Russia then formally annexed Crimea, although most countries recognise Crimea as part of Ukraine.

== Prehistory ==
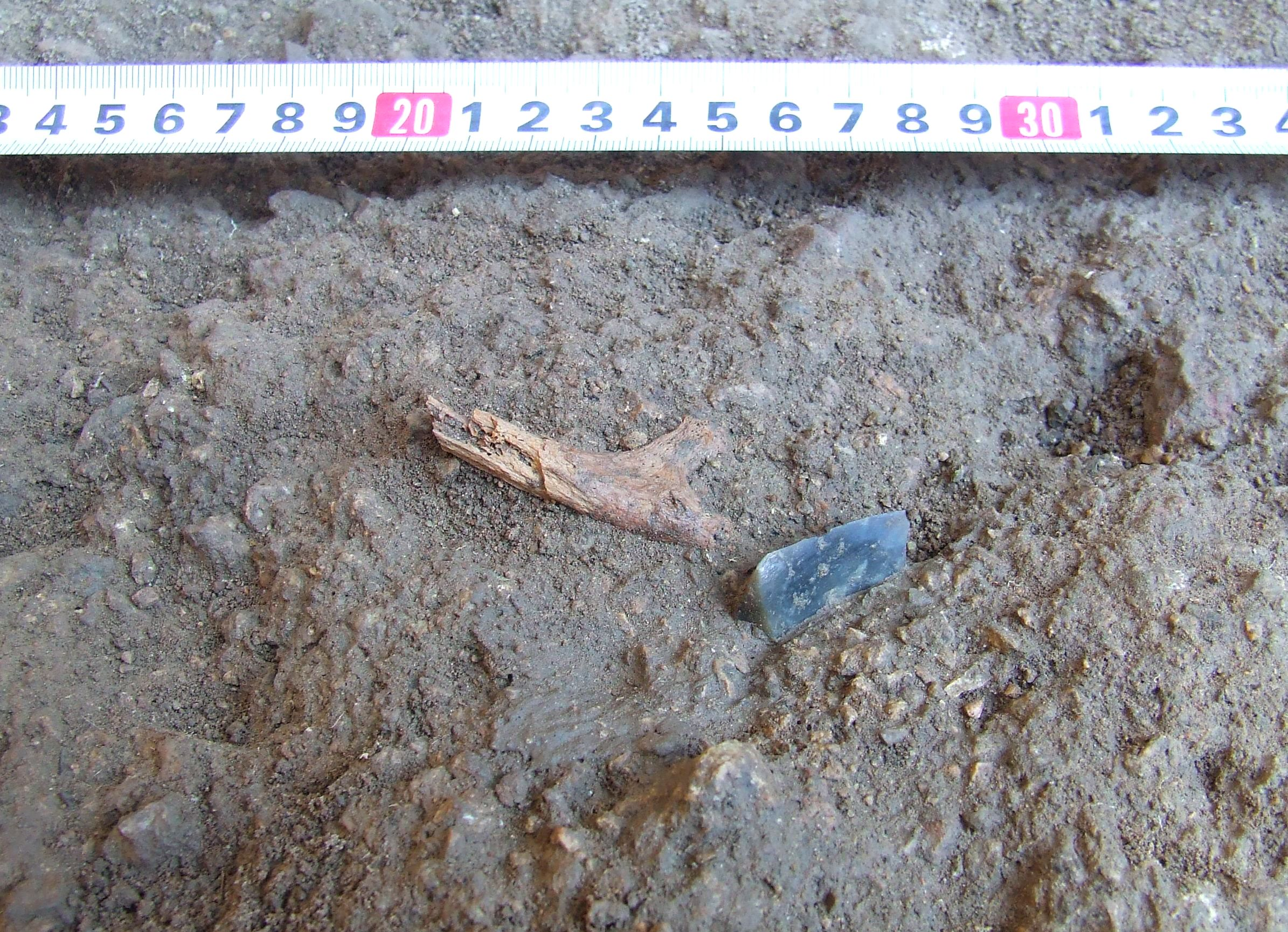
Bone and tool from the Buran-Kaya caves.

Archaeological evidence of human settlement in Crimea dates back to the Middle Paleolithic. Neanderthal remains found at Kiyik-Koba Cave have been dated to about 80,000 BP. Late Neanderthal occupations have also been found at Starosele (c. 46,000 BP) and Buran Kaya III (c. 30,000 BP).

Archaeologists have found some of the earliest anatomically modern human remains in Europe in the Buran-Kaya caves in the Crimean Mountains (east of Simferopol). The fossils are about 32,000 years old, with the artifacts linked to the Gravettian culture. During the Last Glacial Maximum, along with the northern coast of the Black Sea in general, Crimea was an important refuge from which north-central Europe was re-populated after the end of the Ice Age. The East European Plain during this time was generally occupied by periglacial loess-steppe environments, although the climate was slightly warmer during several brief interstadials and began to warm significantly after the beginning of the Late Glacial Maximum. Human site occupation density was relatively high in the Crimean region and increased as early as c. 16,000 years before the present.

Proponents of the Black Sea deluge hypothesis believe Crimea did not become a peninsula until relatively recently, with the rising of the Black Sea level in the 6th millennium BC.

The beginning of the Neolithic in Crimea is not associated with agriculture, but instead with the beginning of pottery production, changes in flint tool-making technologies, and local domestication of pigs. The earliest evidence of domesticated wheat in the Crimean peninsula is from the Chalcolithic Ardych-Burun site, dating to the middle of the 4th millennium BC

By the 3rd millennium BC, Crimea had been reached by the Yamna or "pit grave" culture, assumed to correspond to a late phase of Proto-Indo-European culture in the Kurgan hypothesis.

== Antiquity ==
=== Tauri and Scythians ===
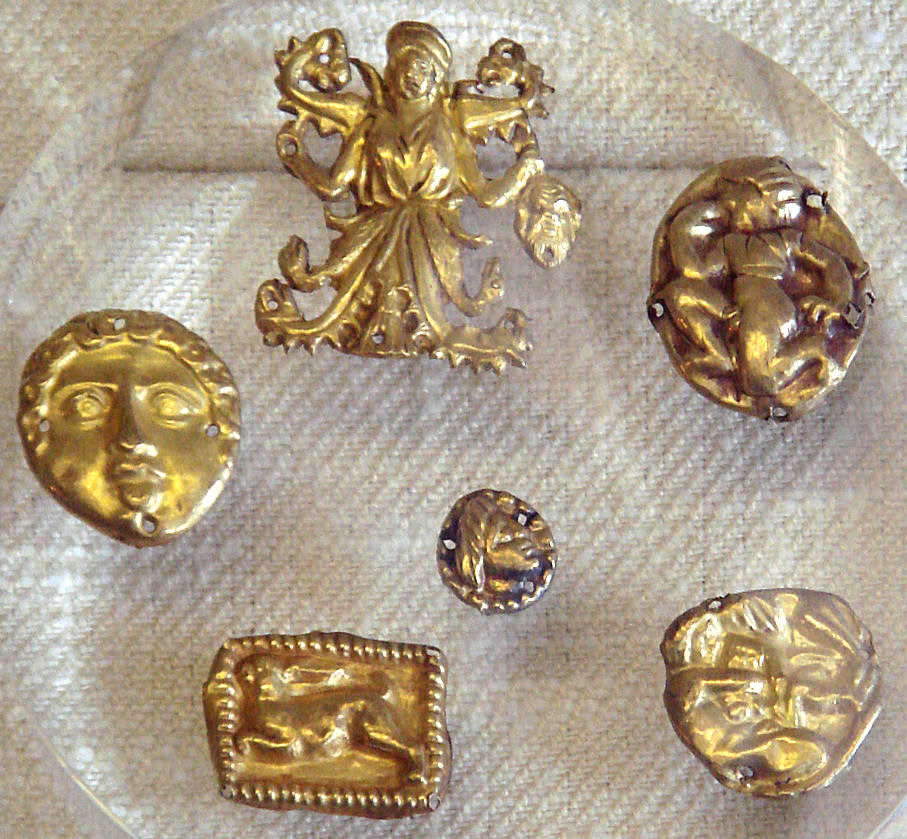
The Scythian treasure of Kul-Oba, in eastern Crimea.

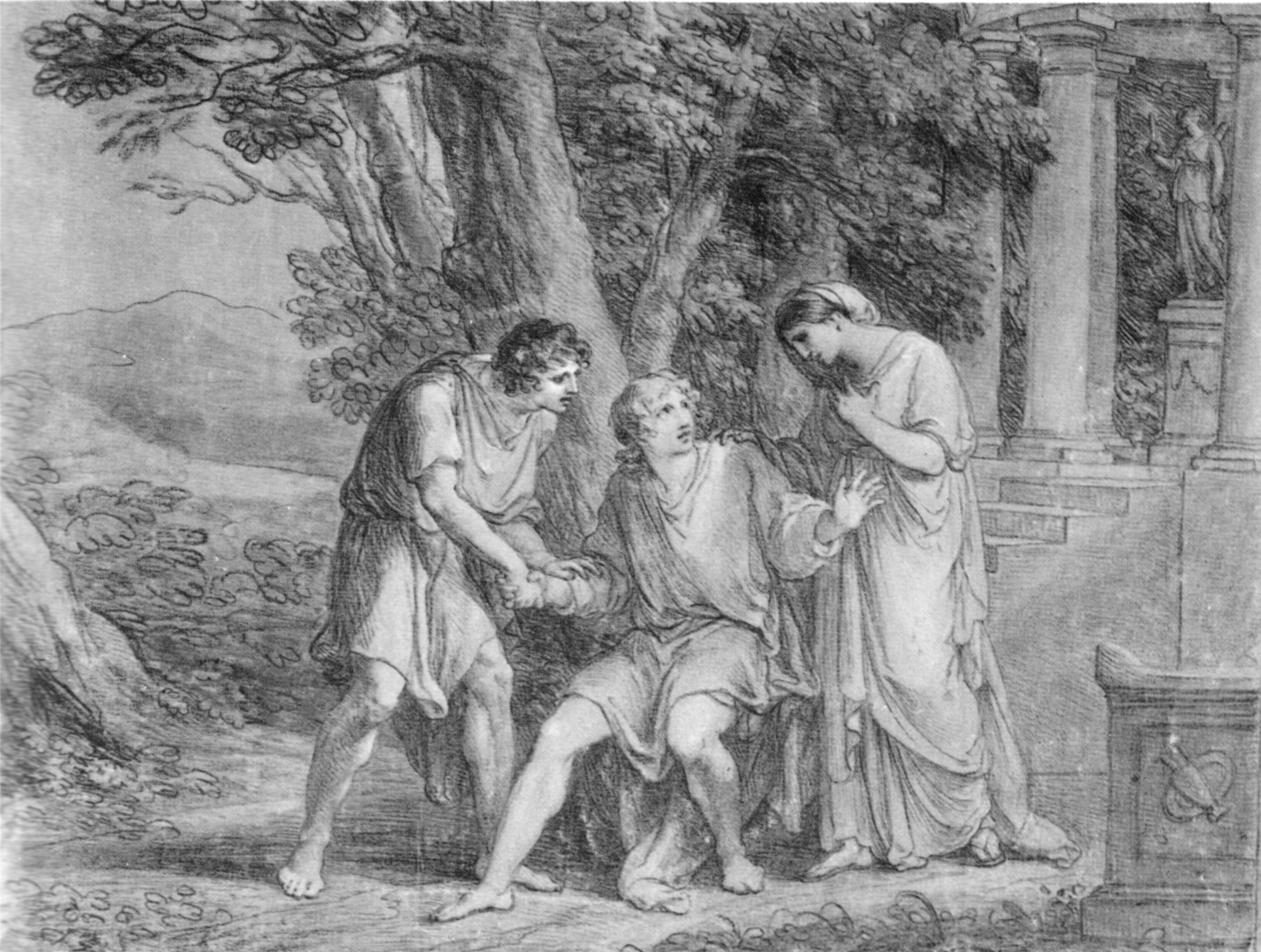
An illustration of Goethe's Iphigenia in Tauris.

Early Iron Age Crimea was settled by two groups separated by the Crimean Mountains, the Tauri to the south and the Iranic Scythians in the north.

Taurians intermixed with the Scythians starting from the end of 3rd century BC were mentioned as "Tauroscythians" and "Scythotaurians" in the works of ancient Greek writers. In Geographica, Strabo refers to the Tauri as a Scythian tribe. However, Herodotus states that the Tauri tribes were geographically inhabited by the Scythians, but they are not Scythians. Also, the Taurians inspired the Greek myths of Iphigenia and Orestes.

The Greeks, who eventually established colonies in Crimea during the Archaic Period, regarded the Tauri as a savage, warlike people. Even after centuries of Greek and Roman settlement, the Tauri were not pacified and continued to engage in piracy on the Black Sea. By the 2nd century BC they had become subject-allies of the Scythian king Scilurus.

The Crimean Peninsula north of the Crimean Mountains was occupied by Scythian tribes. Their center was the city of Scythian Neapolis on the outskirts of present-day Simferopol. The town ruled over a small kingdom covering the lands between the lower Dnieper River and northern Crimea. In the 3rd and 2nd centuries BC, Scythian Neapolis was a city "with a mixed Scythian-Greek population, strong defensive walls and large public buildings constructed using the orders of Greek architecture". The city was eventually destroyed in the mid-3rd century AD by the Goths.

=== Greek settlement ===
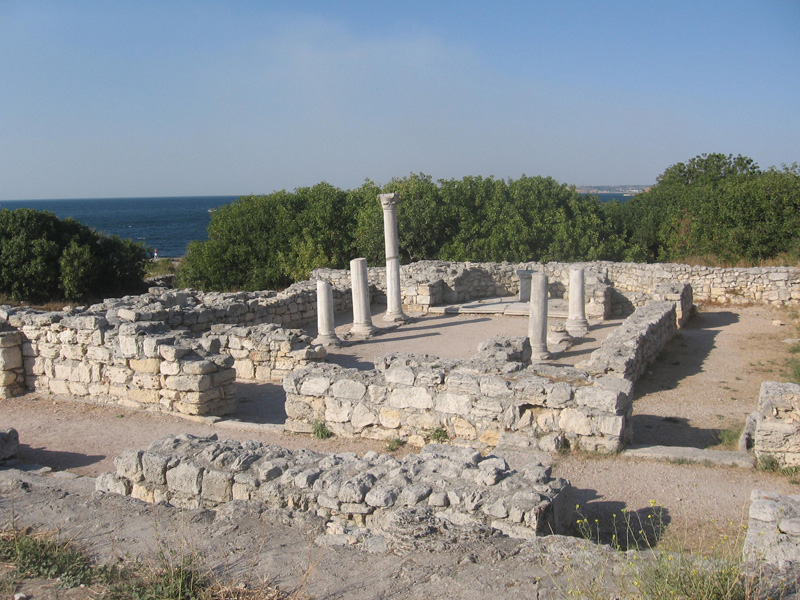
Chersonesos in modern Sevastopol

The ancient Greeks were the first to name the region Taurica after the Tauri. As the Tauri inhabited only the mountainous regions of southern Crimea, the name Taurica was originally used only for this southern part, but was later extended to refer to the whole peninsula.

Greek colonies along the north coast of the Black Sea in the 5th century BCE.

Greek city-states began establishing colonies along the Black Sea coast of Crimea in the 7th or 6th century BC. Theodosia and Panticapaeum were established by Milesians. In the 5th century BC, Dorians from Heraclea Pontica founded the sea port of Chersonesos (in modern Sevastopol).

The Persian Achaemenid Empire under Darius I expanded to Crimea as part of his campaigns against the Scythians in 513 BCE.

In 438 BC, the Archon (ruler) of Panticapaeum assumed the title of the King of Cimmerian Bosporus, a state that maintained close relations with Athens, supplying the city with wheat, honey and other commodities. The last of that line of kings, Paerisades V, being hard-pressed by the Scythians, put himself under the protection of Mithridates VI, the king of Pontus, in 114 BC. After the death of this sovereign, his son, Pharnaces II, was invested by Pompey with the Kingdom of the Cimmerian Bosporus in 63 BC as a reward for the assistance rendered to the Romans in their war against his father. In 15 BC, it was once again restored to the king of Pontus, but from then ranked as a tributary state of Rome.

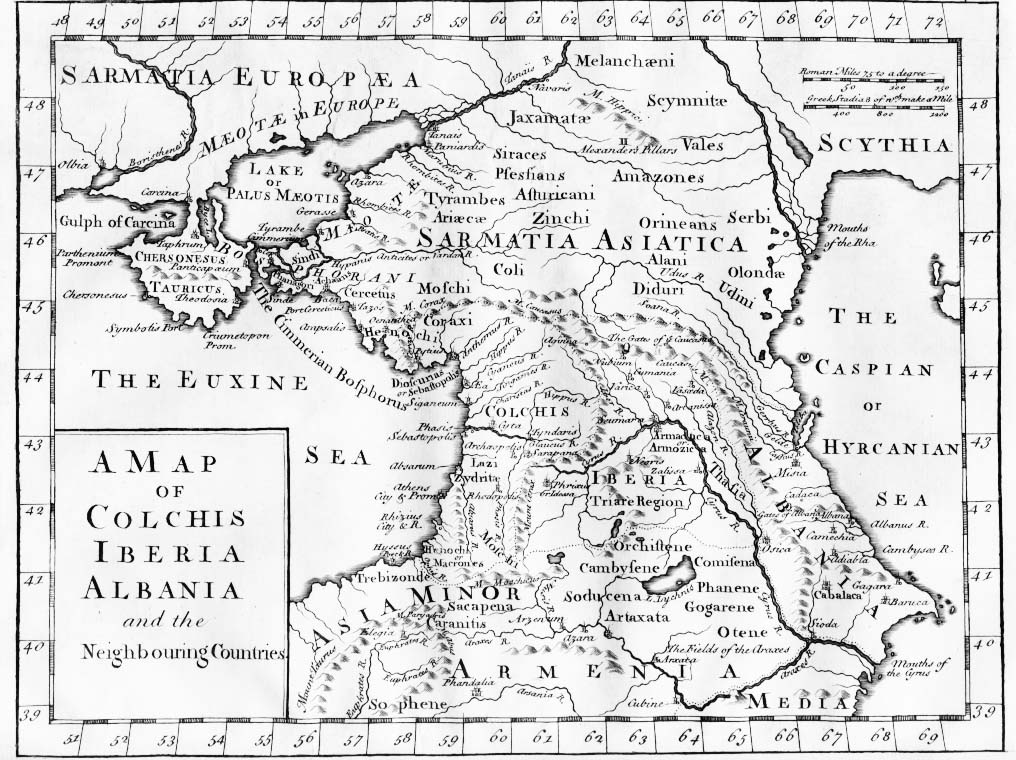
The "Chersonesus Tauricus" of Antiquity, shown on a map printed in London, c. 1770

=== Roman Empire ===
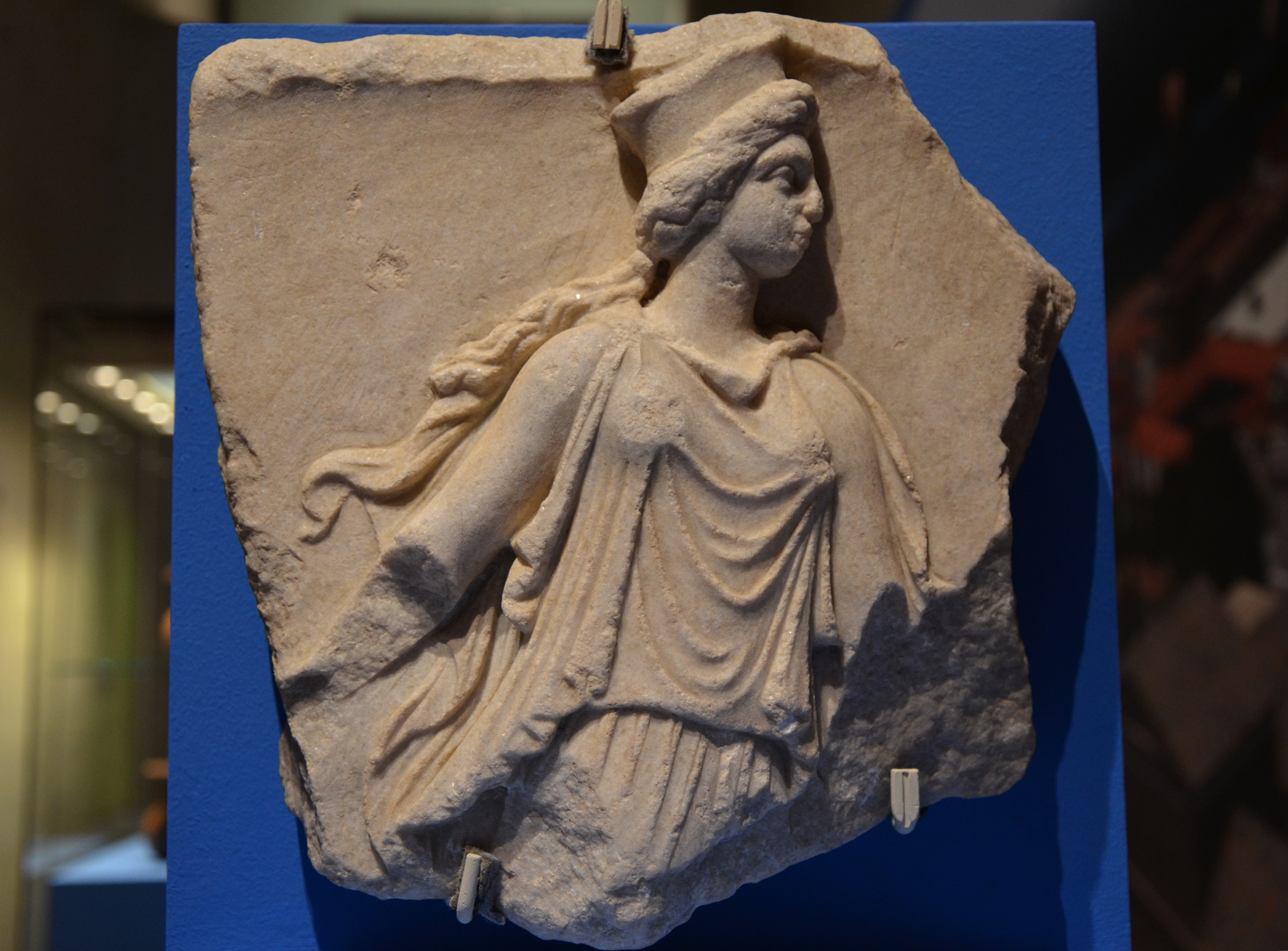
Fragment of a marble relief depicting a Kore, 3rd century BC, from Panticapaeum, Taurica (Crimea), Bosporan Kingdom

In the 2nd century BC, the eastern part of Taurica became part of the Bosporan Kingdom, before becoming a client kingdom of the Roman Empire in the 1st century BC.

During the 1st–3rd century AD, Taurica was host to Roman legions and colonists in Charax, Crimea. The Charax colony was founded under Vespasian with the intention of protecting Chersonesos and other Bosporean trade emporiums from the Scythians. The Roman colony was protected by a vexillatio of the Legio I Italica; it also hosted a detachment of the Legio XI Claudia at the end of the 2nd century. The camp was abandoned by the Romans in the mid-3rd century. This de facto province would have been controlled by the legatus of one of the Legions stationed in Charax.

Throughout the later centuries, Crimea was invaded or occupied successively by the Goths (AD 250), the Huns (376), the Bulgars (4th–8th century), the Khazars (8th century).

Crimean Gothic, an East Germanic language, was spoken by the Crimean Goths in some isolated locations in Crimea until the late 18th century.

== Middle Ages ==
=== Rus' and Byzantium ===
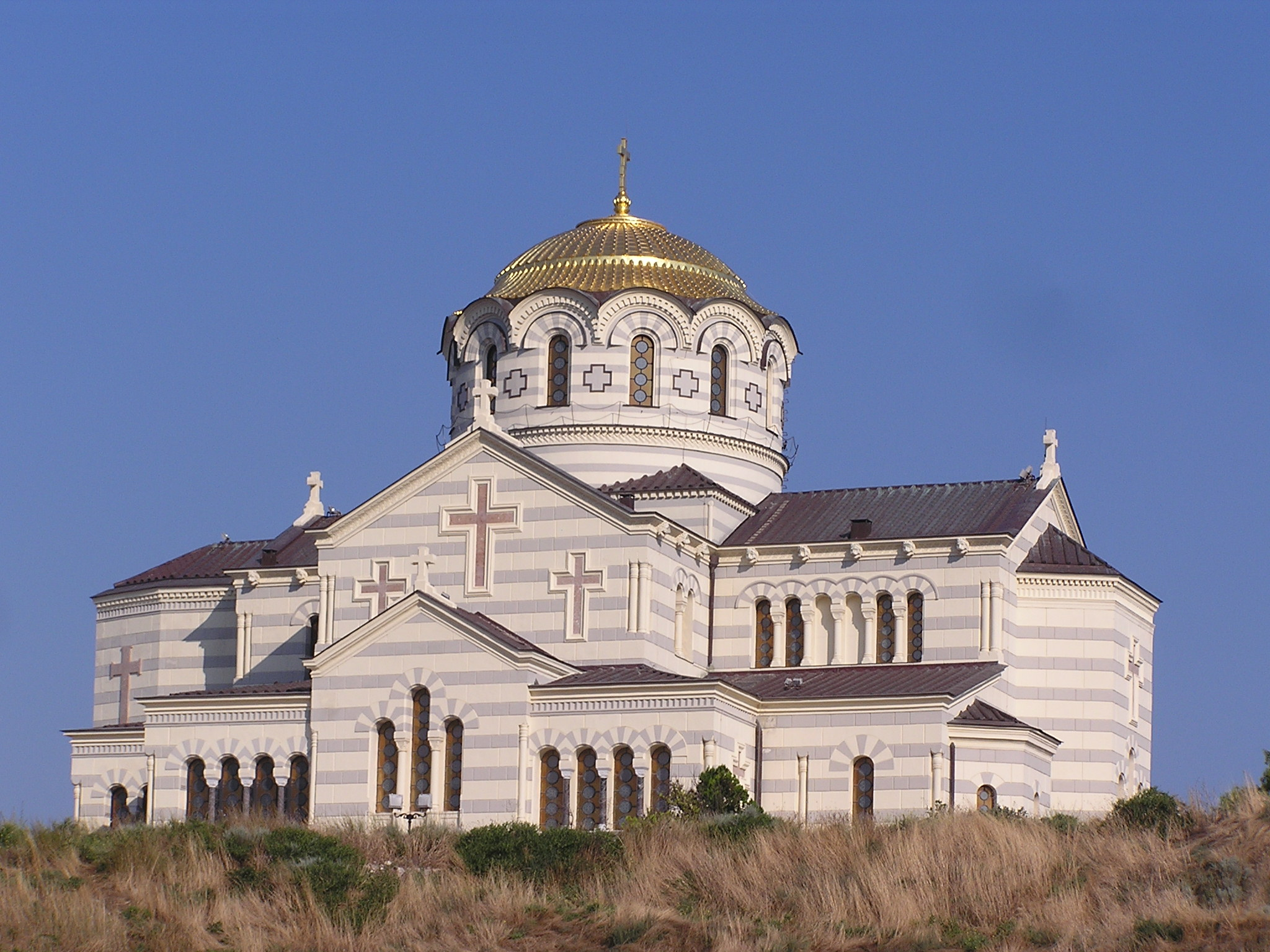
The Chersonesus Cathedral, built on the site where Vladimir the Great is believed to have been baptized in 989 CE.

During the entirety of the Byzantine period, the urban areas were Greek-speaking and eastern Christian.

In the 9th century CE, Byzantium established the Theme of Cherson to defend against incursions by the Rus' Khaganate. The Crimean peninsula from this time was contested between Byzantium, Rus' and Khazaria. The area remained the site of overlapping interests and contact between the early medieval Slavic, Turkic and Greek spheres.

It became a center of Byzantine slave trade. Slavs (saqaliba) were sold to Byzantium and other places in Anatolia and the Middle East during this period.

In the mid-10th century, the eastern area of Crimea was conquered by Prince Sviatoslav I of Kiev and became part of the Kievan Rus' principality of Tmutarakan. The peninsula was wrested from the Byzantines by the Kievan Rus' in the 10th century; a major Byzantine outpost, Chersonesus, was taken in 988 CE. A year later, Grand Prince Vladimir of Kiev accepted the hand of Emperor Basil II's sister Anna in marriage, and was baptized by the local Byzantine priest at Chersonesus, thus marking the entry of Rus' into the Christian world. Chersonesus Cathedral marks the location of this historic event.

=== The Crimean steppe ===
Throughout the ancient and medieval period the interior and north of Crimea was occupied by a changing cast of invading steppe nomads, such as the Tauri, Cimmerians, Scythians, Sarmatians, Crimean Goths, Anglo-Saxons, Alans, Bulgars, Huns, Khazars, Kipchaks and Mongols.

The Bosporan Kingdom had exercised some control of the majority of the peninsula at the height of its power, with Kievan Rus' also having some control of the interior of Crimea after the tenth century.

=== Mongol invasion and later medieval period ===
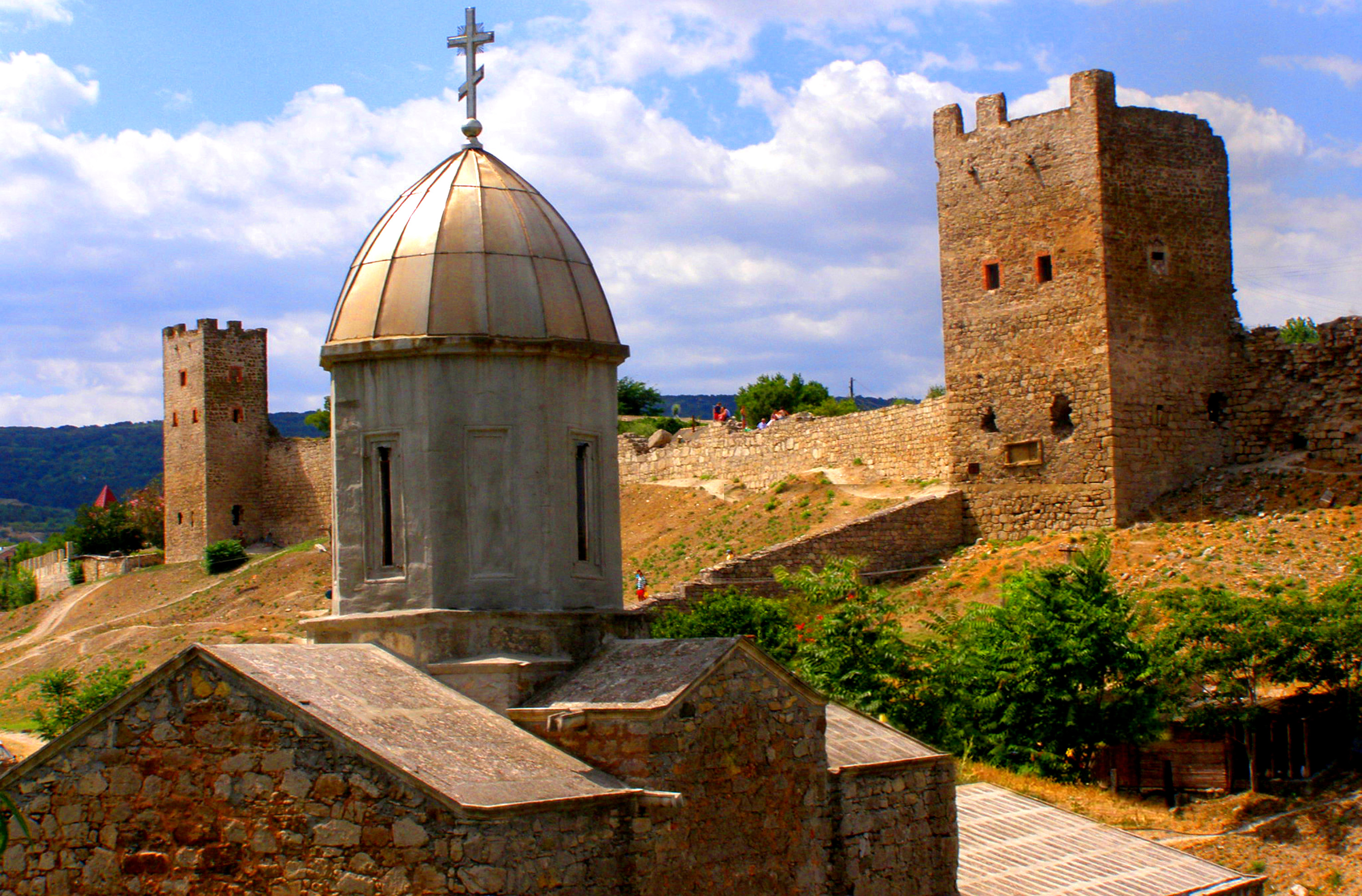
Genoese fortress of Caffa

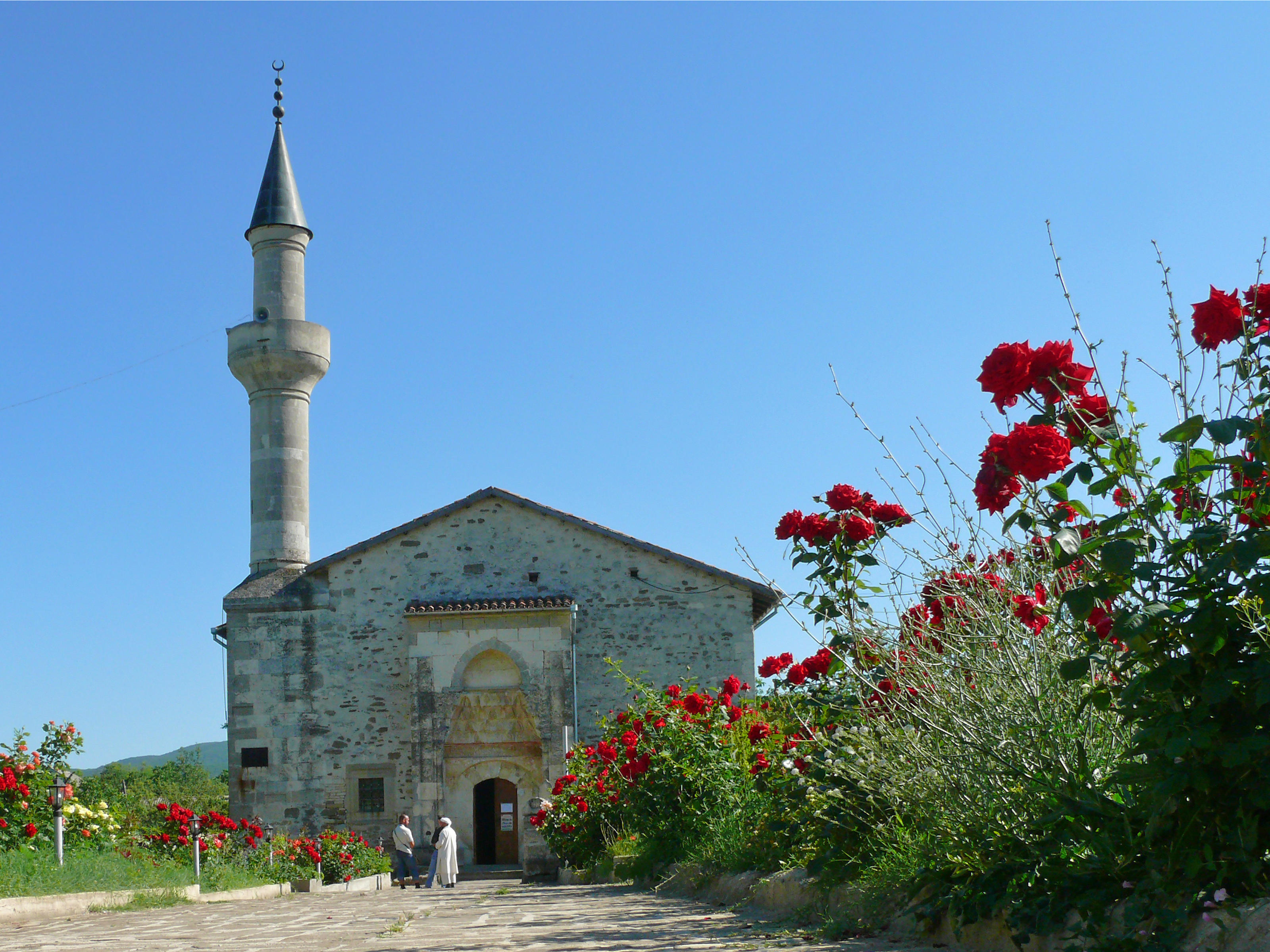
Khan Uzbek Mosque 1314, Staryi Krym

The overseas territories of Trebizond, Perateia, had already been subjected to pressure from the Genoese and Kipchaks by the time Alexios I of Trebizond died in 1222, before the Mongol invasions began its western sweep through Volga Bulgaria in 1223.

Kiev lost its hold on the Crimean interior in the early 13th century due to the Mongol invasions. In the summer of 1238 Batu Khan devastated the Crimean peninsula and pacified Mordovia, reaching Kiev by 1240. The Crimean interior came under the control of the Turco-Mongol Golden Horde from 1239 to 1441. The name Crimea (via Italian, from Turkic Qirim) originates as the name of the provincial capital of the Golden Horde, the city now known as Staryi Krym.

Trebizond's Perateia soon became the Principality of Theodoro and Genoese Gazaria, respectively sharing control of the south of Crimea until the Ottoman intervention of 1475.

In the 13th century the Republic of Genoa seized the settlements that their rivals, the Venetians, had built along the Crimean coast and established themselves at Cembalo (present-day Balaklava), Soldaia (Sudak), Cherco (Kerch) and Caffa (Feodosiya), gaining control of the Crimean economy and the Black Sea commerce for two centuries. Genoa and its colonies fought a series of wars with the Mongol states between the 13th and 15th centuries.

In 1346 the Golden Horde army besieging Genoese Kaffa (present-day Feodosiya) in the siege of Kaffa catapulted the bodies of Mongol warriors who had died of plague over the walls of the city. Historians have speculated that Genoese refugees from this engagement may have brought the Black Death to Western Europe.

== Crimean Khanate (1443–1783) ==
Crimea in the middle of the 15th century

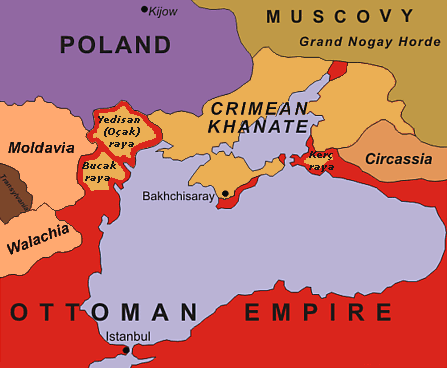
The Crimean Khanate in 1600

After Timur destroyed a Mongol Golden Horde army in 1399, the Crimean Tatars founded an independent Crimean Khanate under Hacı I Giray (a descendant of Genghis Khan) by 1443. Hacı I Giray and his successors reigned first at Qırq Yer, then – from the beginning of the 15th century – at Bakhchisaray.

The Crimean Tatars controlled the steppes that stretched from the Kuban to the Dniester River, but they were unable to take control of the commercial Genoese towns in the Crimea. In 1462, Kaffa recognized Polish suzerainty, though this suzerainty was only nominal. After the Crimean Tatars asked for help from the Ottomans, an Ottoman invasion of the Genoese towns led by Gedik Ahmed Pasha in 1475 brought Kaffa and the other trading towns under their control.

After the capture of the Genoese towns, the Ottoman Sultan held Khan Meñli I Giray captive, later releasing him in return for accepting Ottoman suzerainty over the Crimean Khans and allowing them rule as tributary princes of the Ottoman Empire. However, the Crimean Khans still had a large amount of autonomy from the Ottoman Empire, and followed the rules they thought best for them.

Crimean Tatars introduced the practice of raids into Eastern Slavic lands (the Wild Fields), in which they captured slaves for sale. For example, from 1450 to 1586, eighty-six Tatar raids were recorded, and from 1600 to 1647, seventy. In the 1570s close to 20,000 slaves a year went on sale in Kaffa.

Slaves and freedmen formed approximately 75% of the Crimean population. In 1769 a last major Tatar raid, which took place during the Russo-Turkish War of 1768-1774, saw the capture of 20,000 slaves.

=== Tatar society ===
The Crimean Tatars as an ethnic group dominated the Crimean Khanate from the 15th to the 18th centuries. They descend from a complicated mixture of Turkic peoples who settled in the Crimea from the 8th century, presumably also absorbing remnants of the Crimean Goths and the Genoese. Linguistically, the Crimean Tatars are related to the Khazars, who invaded the Crimea in the mid-8th century; the Crimean Tatar language forms part of the Kipchak or Northwestern branch of the Turkic languages, although it shows substantial Oghuz influence due to historical Ottoman Turkish presence in the Crimea.

A small enclave of Crimean Karaites, a people of Jewish descent practising Karaism who later adopted a Turkic language, formed in the 13th century. It existed among the Muslim Crimean Tatars, primarily in the mountainous Çufut Qale area.

=== Cossack incursions ===
In 1553–1554 Cossack Hetman Dmytro Vyshnevetsky (in office: 1550–1557) gathered together groups of Cossacks and constructed a fort designed to obstruct Tatar raids into Ukraine. With this action, he founded the Zaporozhian Sich, with which he would launch a series of attacks on the Crimean Peninsula and the Ottoman Turks.

== Independent Khanate ==
In 1774, the Ottoman Empire was defeated by Catherine the Great. After two centuries of conflict, the Russian fleet had destroyed the Ottoman navy and the Russian army had inflicted heavy defeats on the Ottoman land forces.

The Treaty of Küçük Kaynarca signed in June 1774 forced the Sublime Porte to recognize the Tatars of the Crimea as politically independent, meaning that the Crimean Khans fell under Russian influence.

The Crimea was the first Muslim territory to slip from the sultan's suzerainty. The Ottoman Empire's frontiers would gradually shrink, and Russia would proceed to push her frontier westwards to the Dniester.

The Khanate subsequently suffered a gradual internal collapse, particularly after a pogrom created a Russian aided exodus of Christian subjects who were overwhelmingly among the urban classes and created cities such as Mariupol.

== Russian Empire (1783–1917) ==
=== Russian annexation ===
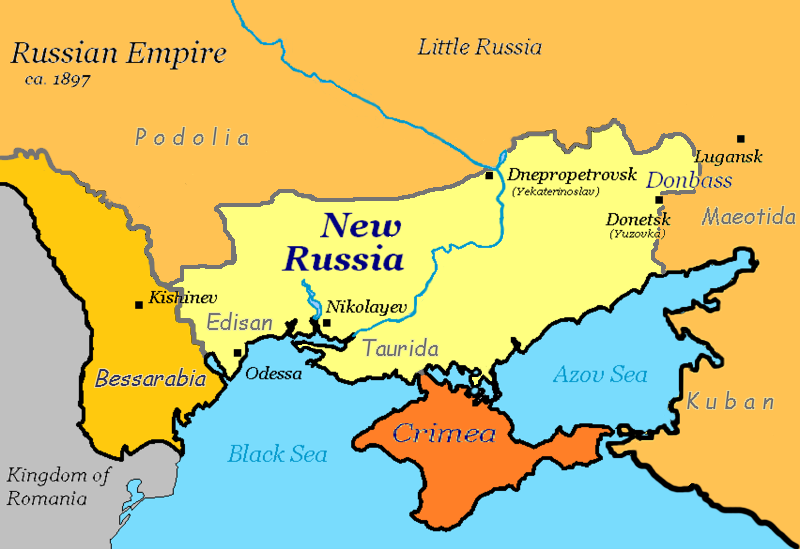
A map of what was called New Russia during the time of the Russian Empire. Only the parts of New Russia that are now in Ukraine are shown.

On 28 December 1783 the Sublime Porte negotiated a trade agreement with the Russian diplomat Bulgakov that recognised the loss of Crimea and other territories that had been held by the Khanate. This increased Russia's power in the Black Sea area.

Crimea went through a number of administrative reforms after Russian annexation, first as the Taurida Oblast in 1784 but in 1796 it was divided into two counties and attached it to the Novorossiysk Governorate, with a new Taurida Governorate established in 1802 with its capital at Simferopol. The governorate included both Crimea as well as larger adjacent areas of the mainland. In 1826 Adam Mickiewicz published his seminal work The Crimean Sonnets after travelling through the Black Sea Coast.

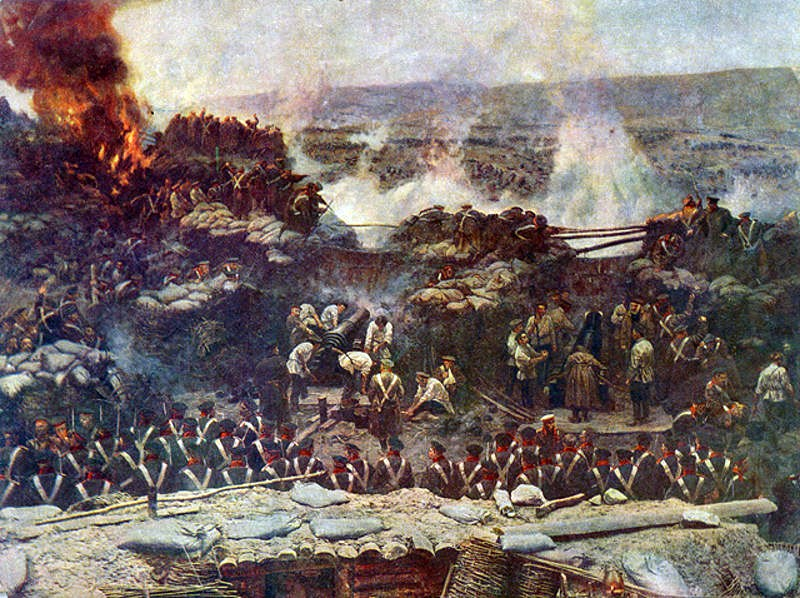
Detail of Franz Roubaud's panoramic painting The Siege of Sevastopol (1904)

=== Crimean War ===
The Crimean War (1853–1856), a conflict fought between the Russian Empire and an alliance of the French Empire, the British Empire, the Ottoman Empire, the Kingdom of Sardinia, and the Duchy of Nassau, was part of a long-running contest between the major European powers for influence over territories of the declining Ottoman Empire. Russia and the Ottoman Empire went to war in October 1853 over Russia's rights to protect Orthodox Christians. To stop Russia's conquests, France and Britain entered in March 1854. While some of the war was fought elsewhere, the principal engagements were in Crimea.

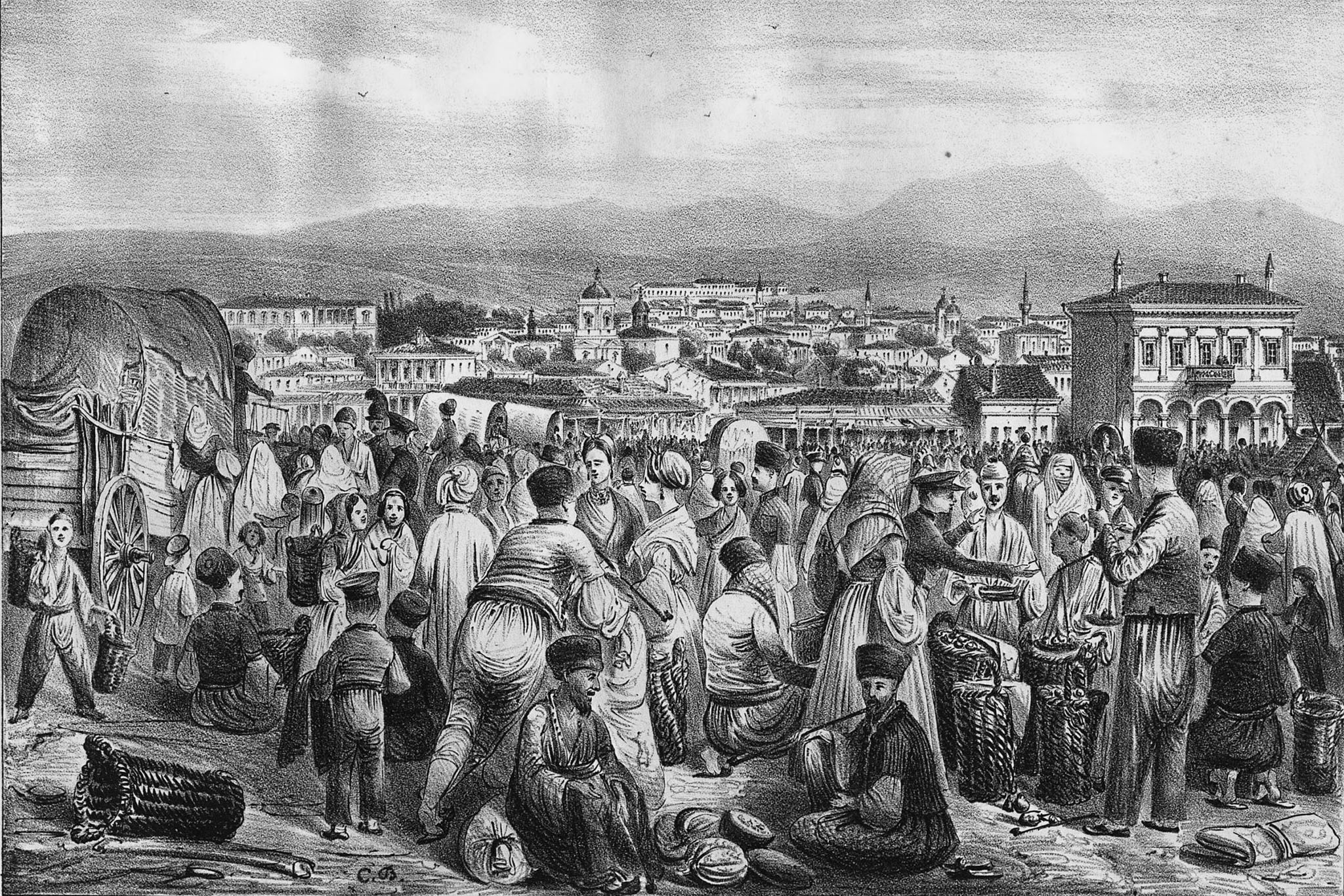
Bazaar in Simferopol in 1842

The immediate cause of the war involved the rights of Christian minorities in Palestine, which was part of the Ottoman Empire. The French promoted the rights of Roman Catholics, and Russia promoted those of the Eastern Orthodox Church. Longer-term causes involved the decline of the Ottoman Empire, the expansion of the Russian Empire in the preceding Russo-Turkish Wars, and the British and French preference to preserve the Ottoman Empire to maintain the balance of power in the Concert of Europe. It has widely been noted that the causes, in one case involving an argument over a key, had never revealed a "greater confusion of purpose" but led to a war that stood out for its "notoriously incompetent international butchery".

Following action in the Danubian Principalities and in the Black Sea, allied troops landed in Crimea in September 1854 and besieged the city of Sevastopol, home of the Tsar's Black Sea Fleet and the associated threat of potential Russian penetration into the Mediterranean. After extensive fighting throughout Crimea, the city fell on 9 September 1855. The war ended with a Russian loss in February 1856.

=== Late Imperial era ===
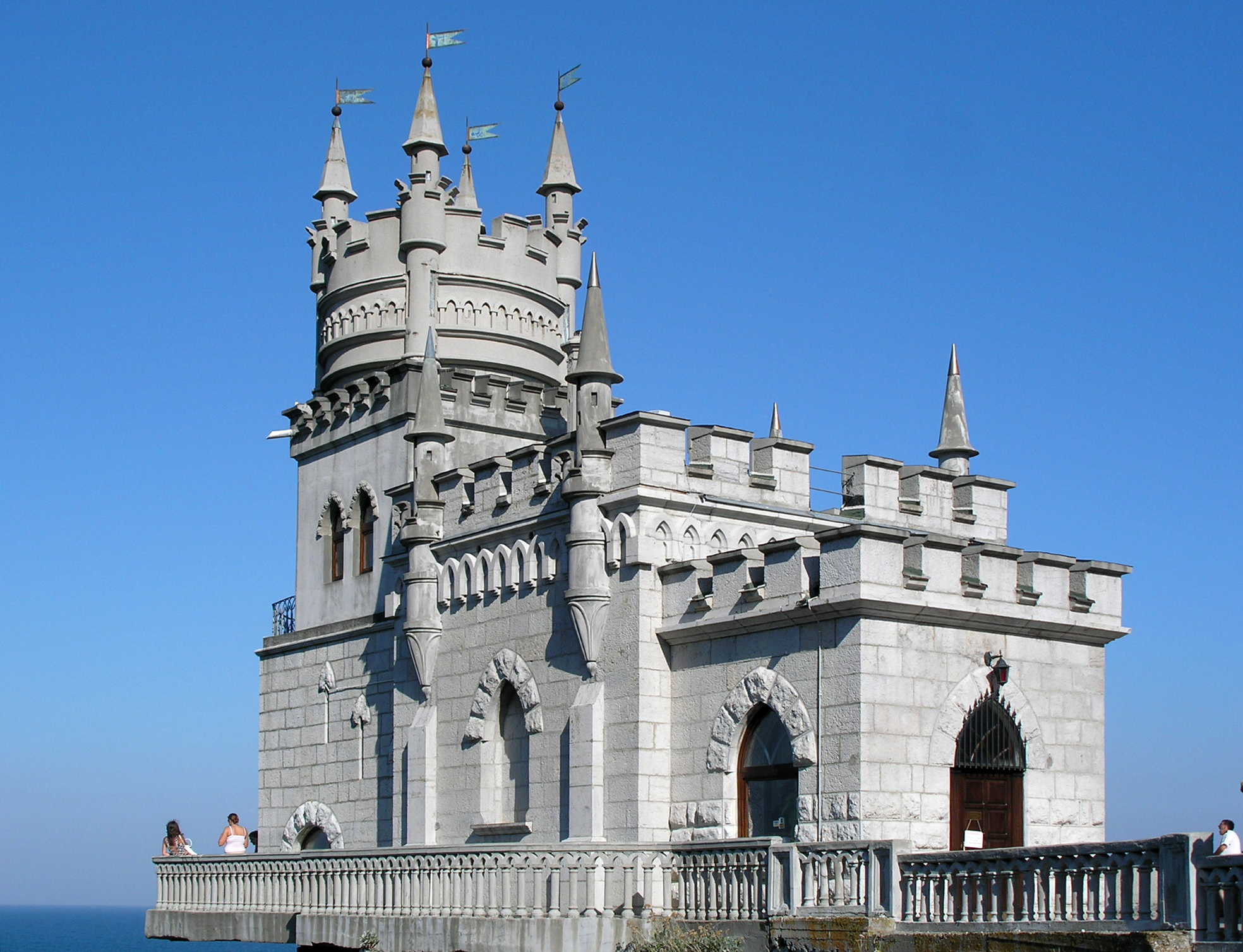
The Swallow's Nest, a symbol of Crimea, one of the best-known, romantic castles near Yalta. It was built in 1912 for Baltic German businessman Baron Pavel von Steingel in the Neo-Gothic style. It was designed by Russian architect Leonid Sherwood.

The war devastated much of the economic and social infrastructure of Crimea. The Crimean Tatars had to flee from their homeland en masse, forced by the conditions created by the war, persecution, and land expropriations. Those who survived the trip, famine, and disease, resettled in Dobruja, Anatolia, and other parts of the Ottoman Empire. Finally, the Russian government decided to stop the process, as agriculture began to suffer due to the unattended fertile farmland. By the late 19th century, Crimean Tatars continued to form a slight plurality of Crimea's still largely rural population and were the predominant portion of the population in the mountainous area and about half of the steppe population.

There were large numbers of Russians concentrated in the Feodosiya district and Ukrainians as well as smaller numbers of Jews (including Krymchaks and Crimean Karaites), Belarusians, Turks, Armenians, and Greeks and Roma. Germans and Bulgarians settled in the Crimea at the beginning of the 19th century, receiving a large allotment and fertile land and later wealthy colonists began to buy land, mainly in Perekopsky and Evpatoria uyezds.

== Russian Civil War (1917–1922) ==
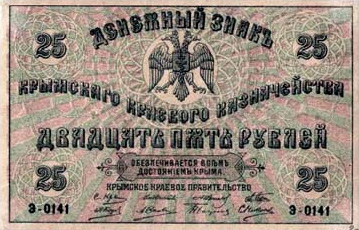
A 25-ruble banknote of the Crimean Regional Government

Following the Russian Revolution of 1917, the military and political situation in Crimea was chaotic, as in much of Russia. During the ensuing Russian Civil War, Crimea changed hands numerous times and was for a time a stronghold of the anti-Bolshevik White Army. It was in Crimea that the White Russians led by General Wrangel made their last stand against Nestor Makhno and the Red Army in 1920. When resistance was crushed, many of the anti-Bolshevik fighters and civilians escaped by ship to Istanbul. Approximately 50,000 White prisoners of war and civilians were summarily executed by shooting or hanging after Wrangel's defeat at the end of 1920, in one of the largest massacres of the Civil War. Between 56,000 and 150,000 of the civilian population were then murdered as part of the Red Terror, organized by Béla Kun.

Crimea changed hands several times over the course of the conflict and several political entities were set up on the peninsula, including the following.

Country	Jurisdiction	Period	Details
Russian Revolution and Civil War (1917–1921)	Crimean People's Republic	December 1917 – January 1918	Crimean Tatar government
Russian Revolution and Civil War (1917–1921)	Taurida Soviet Socialist Republic	19 March – 30 April 1918	Bolshevik government
Russian Revolution and Civil War (1917–1921)	Ukrainian State	May – June 1918	
Russian Revolution and Civil War (1917–1921)	First Crimean Regional Government	25 June – 25 November 1918	German puppet state under Lipka Tatar General Maciej (Suleyman) Sulkiewicz
Russian Revolution and Civil War (1917–1921)	Second Crimean Regional Government	November 1918 – April 1919	Anti-Bolshevik government under Crimean Karaite former Kadet member Solomon Krym
Russian Revolution and Civil War (1917–1921)	Crimean Socialist Soviet Republic	2 April – June 1919	Bolshevik government
Russian Revolution and Civil War (1917–1921)	South Russian Government	February – April 1920	Government of White movement's General Anton Denikin
Russian Revolution and Civil War (1917–1921)	Government of South Russia	April (officially, 16 August) – 16 November 1920	Government of White movement's General Pyotr Wrangel
Russian Revolution and Civil War (1917–1921)	Bolshevik revolutionary committee government	November 1920 – 18 October 1921	Bolshevik government under Béla Kun (until 20 February 1921), then Mikhail Polyakov
Russian Revolution and Civil War (1917–1921)	Crimean Autonomous Socialist Soviet Republic	18 October 1921 – 30 June 1945	Autonomous republic of the Russian SFSR
Soviet era (1921–1991)	Crimean Autonomous Socialist Soviet Republic	18 October 1921 – 30 June 1945	Autonomous republic of the Russian SFSR

== Soviet Union (1922–1991) ==
=== Interbellum ===
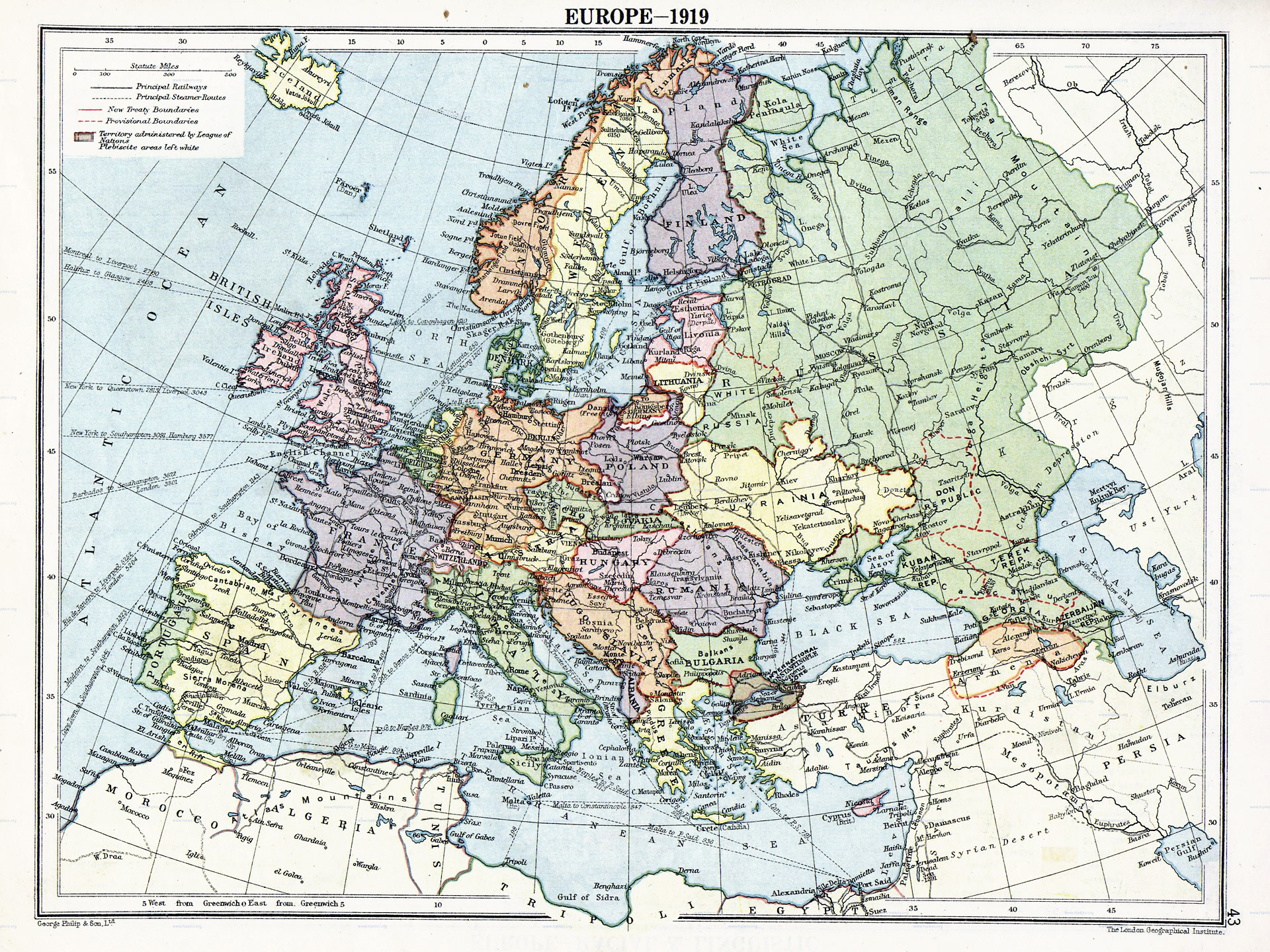
London Geographical Institute's 1919 map of Europe showing Crimea

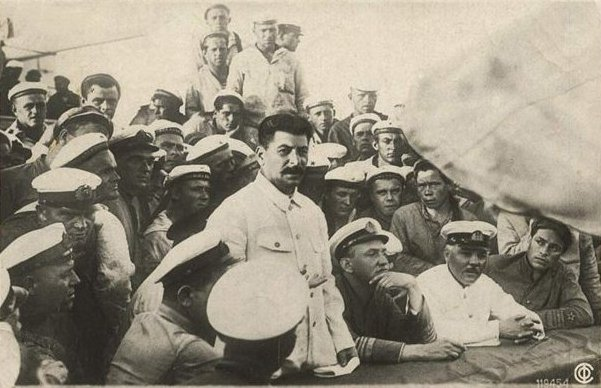
Stalin on board the "Red Ukraine" warship, Crimean coast near the village of Mukhalatka, 1929

Crimea became part of the Russian Soviet Federative Socialist Republic on 18 October 1921 as the Crimean Autonomous Soviet Socialist Republic. The Russian SFSR founded the Union of Soviet Socialist Republics in 1922, with the Crimean ASSR retaining a degree of nominal autonomy and run as a Crimean Tatar enclave. However, this did not protect the Crimean Tatars, who constituted about 25% of the Crimean population, from Joseph Stalin's repressions of the 1930s. The Greeks were another cultural group that suffered. Their lands were lost during the process of collectivisation, in which farmers were not compensated with wages. Schools which taught Greek were closed and Greek literature was destroyed, because the Soviets considered the Greeks as "counter-revolutionary" with their links to capitalist state Greece, and their independent culture.

From 1923 until 1944 there was an effort to create Jewish settlements in Crimea. There were two attempts to establish Jewish autonomy in Crimea, but both were ultimately unsuccessful.

Crimea experienced two severe famines in the 20th century, the Famine of 1921–1922 and the Holodomor of 1932–1933. A large Slavic population (mainly Russians and Ukrainians) influx occurred in the 1930s as a result of the Soviet policy of regional development. These demographic changes permanently altered the ethnic balance in the region.

=== World War II ===
During World War II, Crimea was a scene of some of the bloodiest battles. The leaders of the Third Reich were anxious to conquer and colonize the fertile and beautiful peninsula as part of their policy of resettling the Germans in Eastern Europe at the expense of the Slavs. In the Crimean campaign, German and Romanian troops suffered heavy casualties in the summer of 1941 as they tried to advance through the narrow Isthmus of Perekop linking Crimea to the Soviet mainland. Once the German army broke through (Operation Trappenjagd), they occupied most of Crimea, with the exception of the city of Sevastopol, which was besieged and later awarded the honorary title of Hero City after the war. The Red Army lost over 170,000 men killed or taken prisoner, and three armies (44th, 47th, and 51st) with twenty-one divisions.

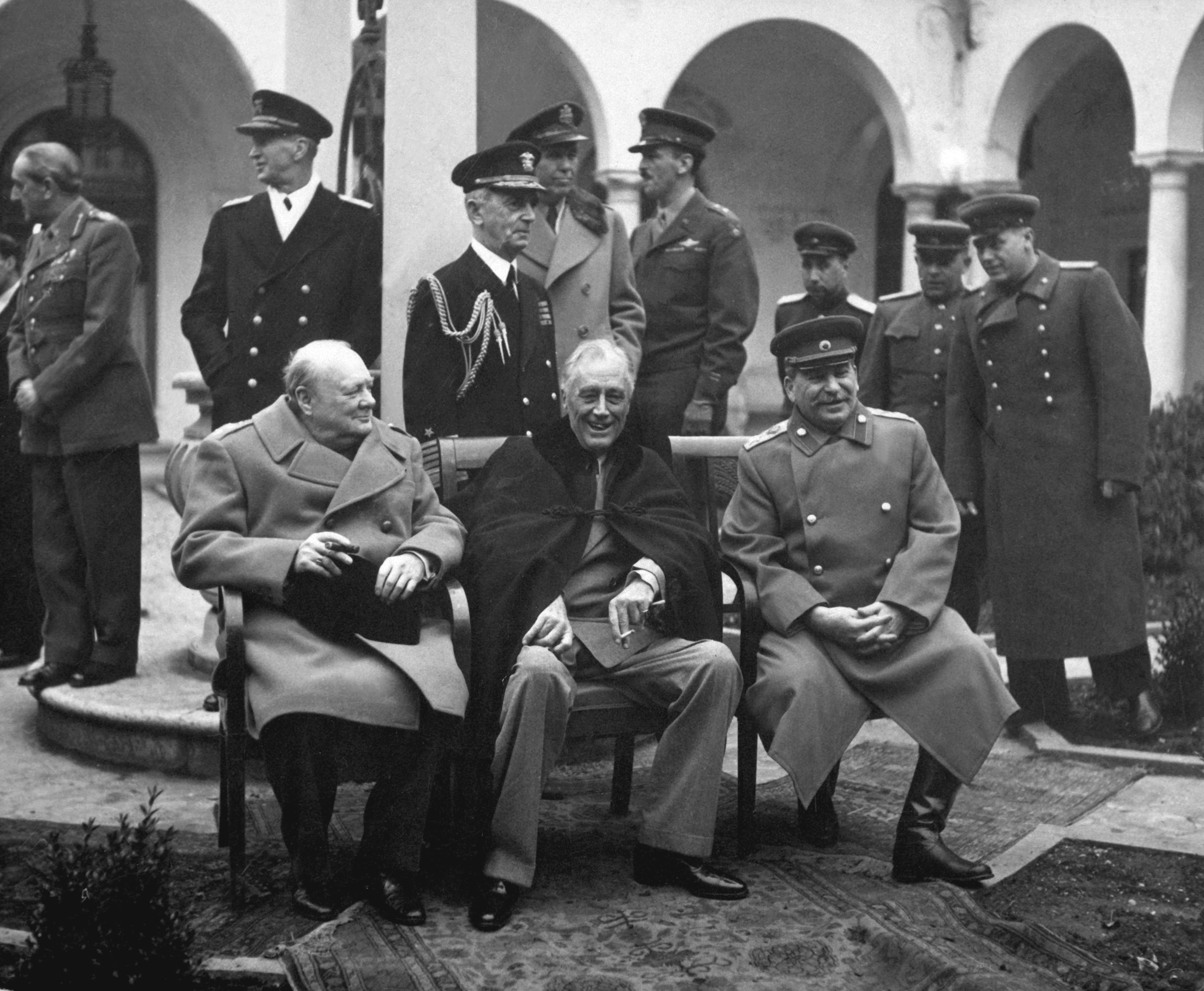
The "Big Three" at the Yalta Conference in Crimea: Winston Churchill, Franklin D. Roosevelt and Joseph Stalin.

Sevastopol held out from October 1941 until 4 July 1942 when the Germans finally captured the city. From 1 September 1942, the peninsula was administered as the Generalbezirk Krim (general district of Crimea) und Teilbezirk (and sub-district) Taurien by the Nazi Generalkommissar Alfred Eduard Frauenfeld (1898–1977), under the authority of the three consecutive Reichskommissare for the entire Ukraine. In spite of heavy-handed tactics by the Nazis and the assistance of the Romanian and Italian troops, the Crimean mountains remained an unconquered stronghold of the native resistance (the partisans) until the day when the peninsula was freed from the occupying force.

The Crimean Jews were targeted for annihilation during the Nazi occupation. According to Yitzhak Arad, "In January 1942 a company of Tatar volunteers was established in Simferopol under the command of Einsatzgruppe 11. This company participated in anti-Jewish manhunts and murder actions in the rural regions." Around 40,000 Crimean Jews were murdered.

The successful Crimean offensive meant that in May 1944 Sevastopol came under the control of troops from the Soviet Union. The so-called "City of Russian Glory" once known for its beautiful architecture was entirely destroyed and had to be rebuilt stone by stone. Due to its enormous historical and symbolic meaning for the Russians, it became a priority for Stalin and the Soviet government to have it restored to its former glory within the shortest time possible.

The Crimean port of Yalta hosted the Yalta Conference of Roosevelt, Stalin and Churchill which was later seen as dividing Europe between the Communist and democratic spheres.

==== Deportation of the Crimean Tatars ====
On 18 May 1944, the entire population of the Crimean Tatars were forcibly deported in the "Sürgün" (Crimean Tatar for exile) to Central Asia by Joseph Stalin's Soviet government as a form of collective punishment on the grounds that they allegedly had collaborated with the Nazi occupation forces and formed pro-German Tatar Legions. On 26 June of the same year Armenian, Bulgarian and Greek population was also deported to Central Asia, and partially to Ufa and its surroundings in the Ural mountains. A total of more than 230,000 people – about a fifth of the total population of the Crimean Peninsula at that time – were deported, mainly to Uzbekistan. 14,300 Greeks, 12,075 Bulgarians, and about 10,000 Armenians were also expelled. By the end of summer 1944, the ethnic cleansing of Crimea was complete. In 1967, the Crimean Tatars were rehabilitated, but they were banned from legally returning to their homeland until the last days of the Soviet Union. The deportation was formally recognized as a genocide by Ukraine and three other countries between 2015 and 2019.

The peninsula was resettled with other peoples, mainly Russians and Ukrainians. Modern experts say that the deportation was part of the Soviet plan to gain access to the Dardanelles and acquire territory in Turkey, where the Tatars had Turkic ethnic kin, or to remove minorities from the Soviet Union's border regions.

Nearly 8,000 Crimean Tatars died during the deportation, and tens of thousands perished subsequently due to the harsh exile conditions. The Crimean Tatar deportation resulted in the abandonment of 80,000 households and 360,000 acres of land.

=== Post-World War II ===
The autonomous republic without its titular nationality was downgraded to an oblast (province) within the Russian SFSR on 30 June 1945. A process of de-Tatarization of Crimea was started to remove the memory of the Tartars, including a massive name change of the vast majority of toponyms, which were given Slavic and communist names. Very few localities – Bakhchysarai, Dzhankoy, İşün, Alushta, Alupka, and Saky – were given their original names back after the fall of the Soviet Union.

==== 1954 transfer to Ukrainian SSR ====
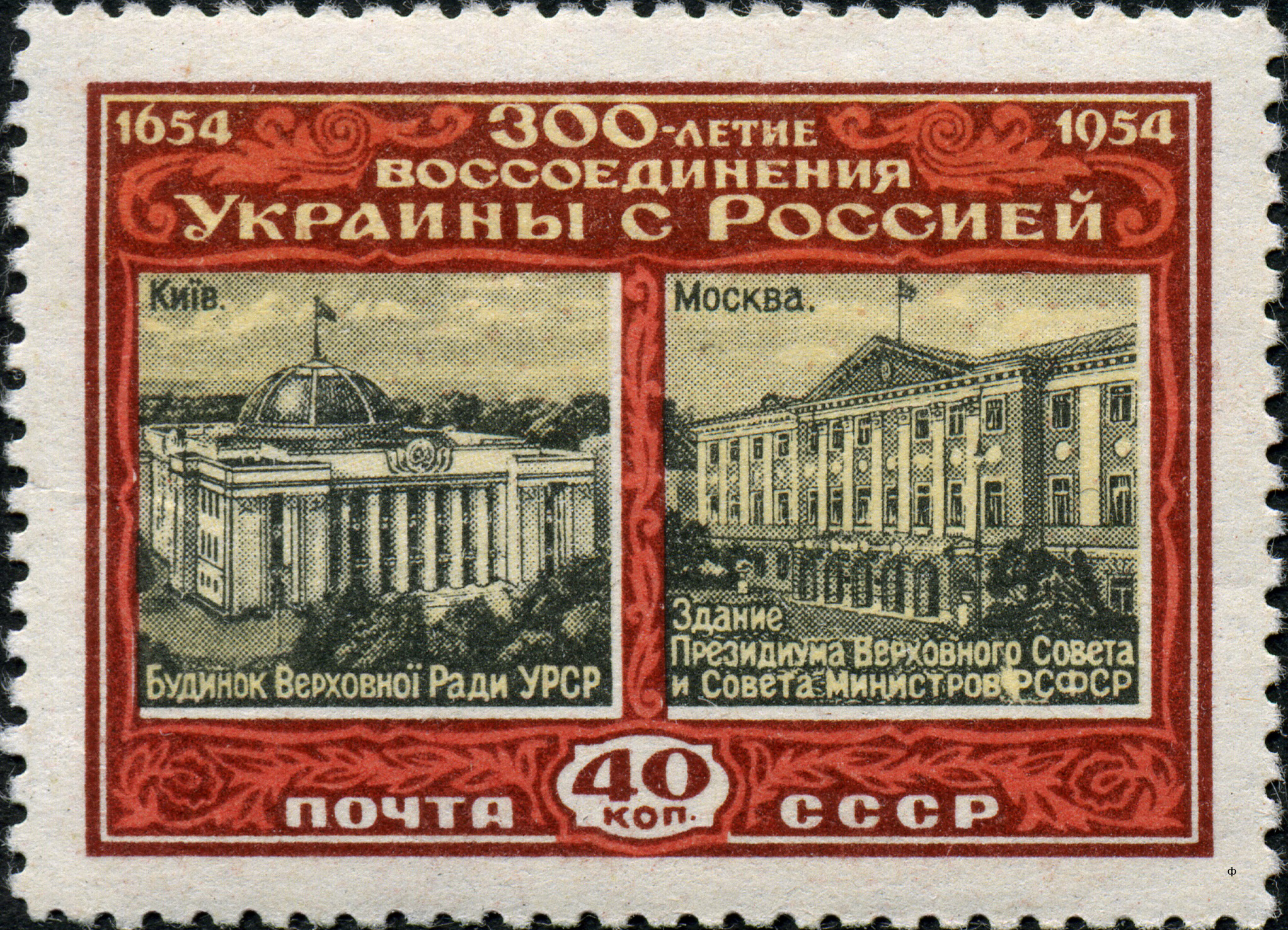
1954 Soviet propaganda stamp marking the 300th anniversary of Ukraine's reunification with Russia

On 19 February 1954, the oblast was transferred from the Russian SFSR to the Ukrainian SSR jurisdiction, on the basis of "the integral character of the economy, the territorial proximity and the close economic and cultural ties between the Crimea Province and the Ukrainian SSR" and to commemorate the 300th anniversary of Ukraine's union with Russia.

Sevastopol was a closed city due to its importance as the port of the Soviet Black Sea Fleet and was attached to the Crimean Oblast only in 1978.

The construction of North Crimean Canal, a land improvement canal for irrigation and watering of Kherson Oblast in southern Ukraine, and the Crimean peninsula, was started in 1957 soon after the transfer of Crimea. The canal also has multiple branches throughout Kherson Oblast and the Crimean peninsula. The main project works took place between 1961 and 1971 and had three stages. The construction was conducted by the Komsomol members sent by the Komsomol travel ticket (Komsomolskaya putyovka) as part of shock construction projects and accounted for some 10,000 "volunteer" workers.

In the post-war years, Crimea thrived as a tourist destination, with new attractions and sanatoriums for tourists. Tourists came from all around the Soviet Union and its satellite countries, particularly from East Germany. In time the peninsula also became a major tourist destination for cruises originating in Greece and Turkey. Crimea's infrastructure and manufacturing also developed, particularly around the sea ports at Kerch and Sevastopol and in the oblast's landlocked capital, Simferopol. Populations of Ukrainians and Russians alike doubled as a result of assimilationist policies, with more than 1.6 million Russians and 626,000 Ukrainians living on the peninsula by 1989.

== Independent Ukraine (since 1991) ==
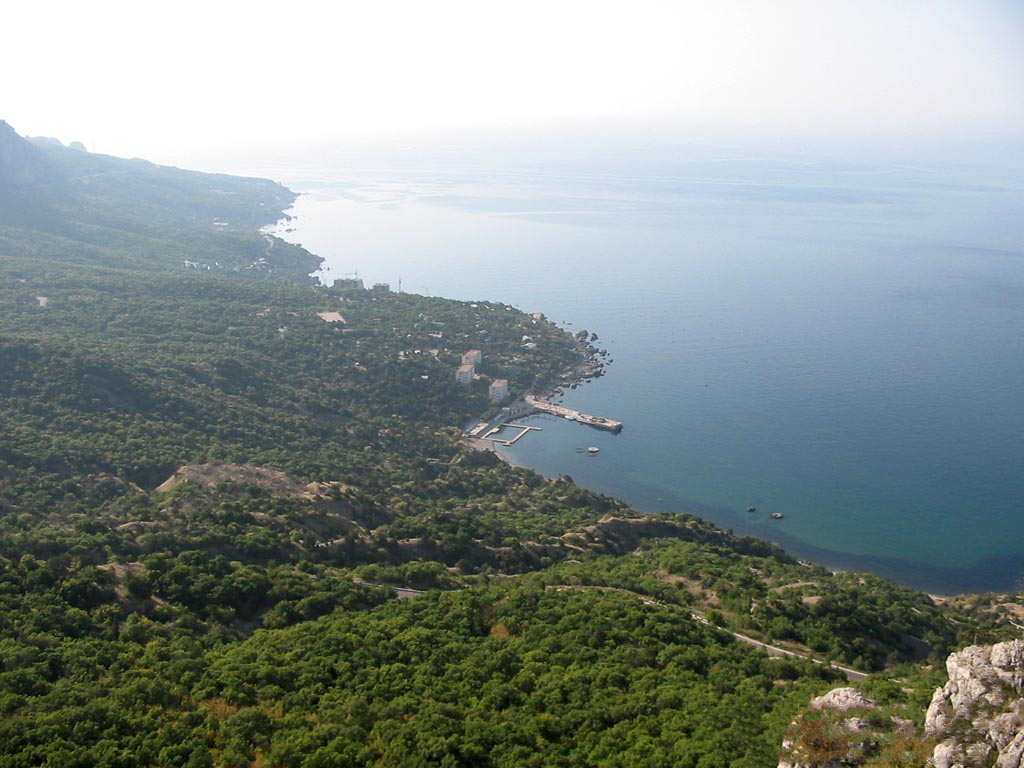
Crimea's southernmost point is the Cape of Sarych on the northern shore of the Black Sea, currently used by the Russian Navy.

With the dissolution of the Soviet Union and Ukrainian independence the majority ethnic Russian Crimean peninsula was reorganized as the Republic of Crimea, after a 1991 referendum with the Crimean authorities pushing for more independence from Ukraine and closer links with Russia.

In 1992 the Supreme Council of Crimea affirmed the peninsula's "sovereignty" as a part of Ukraine. The Crimean parliament proclaimed self-government on 5 May 1992 and passed the first Crimean constitution together with a declaration of conditional independence on the same day. There was stiff resistance from Ukraine and a day later, on 6 May, the same parliament inserted a new sentence into this constitution that declared that Crimea was part of Ukraine. A referendum to confirm the decision was not held until 1994 due to the opposition from the Kyiv government.

The Crimean parliament voted to bring in a President in 1993, which the Kyiv government denounced as unconstitutional. In 1994 Crimea elected the pro-Russian and anti-establishment Yuriy Meshkov. The pro-Russian parties also won the parliamentary election that year. However the president quickly alienated the parliament by asserting strong presidential powers.

In 1995 the Ukrainian Parliament intervened in the political crisis in Crimea, scrapping the Crimean Constitution, removing the president and scrapping the office of President. Almost 4,000 Ukrainian soldiers and police officers were sent to Crimea. Meshkov was removed from power after Ukrainian special forces had entered his residence, disarmed his bodyguards and put him on a plane to Moscow. Meshkov was replaced by Kyiv-appointed Anatoliy Franchuk, with the intent to rein in Crimean aspirations of autonomy. The Verkhovna Rada, the parliament of Crimea, voted to grant Crimea "extensive home rule" during the dispute.

There were also intermittent tensions with Russia over the Soviet Fleet, although a 1997 treaty partitioned the Soviet Black Sea Fleet allowing Russia to continue basing its fleet in Sevastopol with the lease extended in 2010. After the overthrow of the relatively pro-Russian president Yanukovych, Russia invaded and annexed Crimea in 2014.

=== Russian annexation ===
During the Revolution of Dignity in Kyiv that ousted Ukrainian president Viktor Yanukovych, pro- and anti-Euromaidan demonstrations were happening in Crimea. At the same time Russian president Vladimir Putin discussed Ukrainian events with security service chiefs remarking that "we must start working on returning Crimea to Russia". On 27 February, Russian troops captured strategic sites across Crimea, including Crimean parliament and government buildings. Russia then installed the pro-Russian Aksyonov government in Crimea, which organized the Crimean status referendum and declared Crimea's independence on 16 March 2014. Although Russia initially claimed their military was not involved in the events, it later admitted that they were. Russia formally incorporated Crimea on 18 March 2014. Following the annexation, Russia escalated its military presence on the peninsula and made nuclear threats to solidify the new status quo on the ground.

Ukraine and many other countries condemned the annexation and consider it to be a violation of international law and Russian agreements safeguarding the territorial integrity of Ukraine. The annexation led to the other members of the then-G8 suspending Russia from the group and introducing sanctions. The United Nations General Assembly also rejected the referendum and annexation, adopting a resolution affirming the "territorial integrity of Ukraine within its internationally recognised borders".

According to survey carried out by Pew Research Center in 2014, the majority of Crimean residents say they believed the referendum was free and fair (91%) and that the government in Kyiv ought to recognize the results of the vote (88%).

The Russian government opposes the "annexation" label, with Putin defending the referendum as complying with the principle of the self-determination of peoples.

=== Aftermath ===
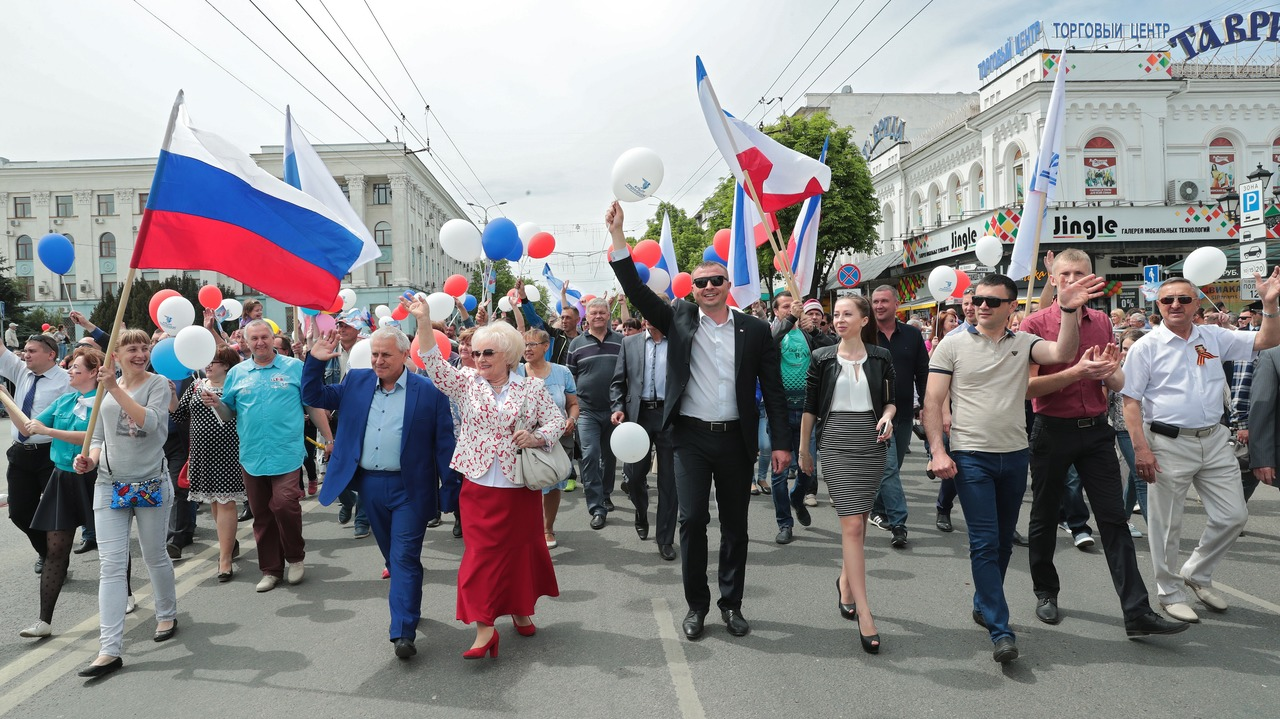
May Day parade in Simferopol, 1 May 2019

Within days of the signing of the accession treaty, the process of integrating Crimea into the Russian federation began with the Russian ruble going into official circulation and later to be the sole currency for legal tender with clocks also moved to Moscow time. A revision of the Russian Constitution was officially released with the Republic of Crimea and the federal city of Sevastopol added to the federal subjects of the Russian Federation, and the Russian Prime Minister Dmitry Medvedev stated that Crimea had been fully integrated into Russia. Since the annexation Russia has supported large migration into Crimea.

Once Ukraine lost control of the territory in 2014, it shut off the water supply of the North Crimean Canal which supplies 85% of the peninsula's freshwater needs from the Dnieper river, the nation's main waterway. Development of new sources of water was undertaken, with huge difficulties, to replace closed Ukrainian sources. In 2022, Russia conquered portions of Kherson Oblast, which allowed it to unblock the North Crimean canal by force, resuming water supply into Crimea.

=== Russian invasion of Ukraine ===
Beginning in July 2022, a series of explosions and fires occurred on the Russian-occupied Crimean Peninsula from where the Russian Army had launched its offensive on Southern Ukraine during the full-scale invasion of Ukraine. Occupied Crimea was a base for the subsequent Russian occupation of Kherson Oblast and Russian occupation of Zaporizhzhia Oblast. The Ukrainian government has not accepted responsibility for all of the attacks.

== See also ==
- Akatziri
- Crimean ASSR (1991–1992)
- Kizil-Koba culture
