= Crimea during the Russian Civil War =

Crimea in the five years after the Russian Revolution had a large number of governments culminating in being a stronghold of anti-Communist forces and the place on Russian soil where they made their last stand.

== History ==
Following the Russian Revolution of 1917, the military and political situation in Crimea was chaotic like that in much of Russia. During the ensuing Russian Civil War, Crimea changed hands numerous times and was for a time a stronghold of the anti-Bolshevik White Army. It was in Crimea that the White Russians led by General Wrangel made their last stand against Nestor Makhno and the Red Army in 1920. When resistance was crushed, many of the anti-Bolshevik fighters and civilians escaped by ship to Istanbul.

Approximately 50,000 White prisoners of war and civilians were summarily executed by shooting or hanging after the defeat of General Wrangel at the end of 1920. This is considered one of the largest massacres in the Civil War.

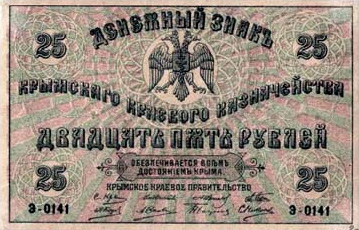
A 25-ruble banknote of the Crimean Regional Government

Between 56,000 and 150,000 of the Whites were murdered as part of the Red Terror, organized by Béla Kun's Crimean Revolutionary Committee. The figures related to the massacre in Crimea remain contested. Anarchist and Bolshevik Victor Serge gave a lower figure for White officers around 13,000 which he claims were exaggerated. Yet, he condemned Kun for his treacherous actions towards allied anarchists and surrendering Whites.

According to social scientist, Nikolay Zayats, from the National Academy of Sciences of Belarus the large, “fantastic” estimates have derived from eyewitness accounts and White army emigre press. A Crimean Cheka report in 1921 showed that 441 people were shot with a modern estimation that 5,000-12,000 people in total were executed in Crimea.

== Changes ==
Crimea changed hands several times over the course of the conflict and several political entities were set up on the peninsula. These included:

Country	Jurisdiction	Period	Details
Russian Revolution and Civil War (1917–1921)	Crimean People's Republic	December 1917 – January 1918	Crimean Tatar government
Russian Revolution and Civil War (1917–1921)	Taurida Soviet Socialist Republic	19 March – 30 April 1918	Bolshevik government
Russian Revolution and Civil War (1917–1921)	Ukrainian State	May – June 1918	
Russian Revolution and Civil War (1917–1921)	First Crimean Regional Government	25 June – 25 November 1918	German puppet state under Lipka Tatar General Maciej (Suleyman) Sulkiewicz
Russian Revolution and Civil War (1917–1921)	Second Crimean Regional Government	November 1918 – April 1919	Anti-Bolshevik government under Crimean Karaite former Kadet member Solomon Krym
Russian Revolution and Civil War (1917–1921)	Crimean Socialist Soviet Republic	2 April – June 1919	Bolshevik government
Russian Revolution and Civil War (1917–1921)	South Russian Government	February – April 1920	Government of White movement's General Anton Denikin
Russian Revolution and Civil War (1917–1921)	Government of South Russia	April (officially, 16 August) – 16 November 1920	Government of White movement's General Pyotr Wrangel
Russian Revolution and Civil War (1917–1921)	Bolshevik revolutionary committee government	November 1920 – 18 October 1921	Bolshevik government under Béla Kun (until 20 February 1921), then Mikhail Polyakov
Russian Revolution and Civil War (1917–1921)	Crimean Autonomous Socialist Soviet Republic	18 October 1921 – 30 June 1945	Autonomous republic of the Russian SFSR
Soviet era (1921–1991)	Crimean Autonomous Socialist Soviet Republic	18 October 1921 – 30 June 1945	Autonomous republic of the Russian SFSR
