= Crimean Socialist Soviet Republic =

1919 socialist state in Crimea

Coordinates: 45°15′N 34°15′E

Crimean Socialist Soviet Republic Крымская Социалистическая Советская Республика (Russian) Krymskaja Socialističeskaja Sovetskaja Respublika
- 1919
- Flag
- Capital: Simferopol
- Common languages: Russian; Crimean Tatar; Ukrainian; German
- Government: Soviet republic
- Chairman
  - 1919: Dmitry Ulyanov
- Legislature: Revolutionary committee
- Historical era: Russian Civil War
  - Bolshevik invasion of Crimea · Fall of the Crimean Regional Government: Mar–Apr 1919
  - Republic established: May 1919
  - White Movement Volunteer army offensive: June 1919
  - Republic defeated · White Movement control established: June
Preceded by	Succeeded by
Crimean Regional Government	South Russia
- Today part of: Russia (disputed); Ukraine; (Note: Since the 2014 Russian annexation of Crimea the status of the Crimea and of the city of Sevastopol is under dispute between Russia and Ukraine; Ukraine and the majority of the international community considers the Crimea and Sevastopol an integral part of Ukraine, while Russia, on the other hand, considers (and administrators) the Crimea and Sevastopol an integral part of Russia.)

The Crimean Socialist Soviet Republic (Russian: Крымская Социалистическая Советская Республика or Крымская Советская Социалистическая Республика; Crimean Tatar: Qırım Şuralar Sotsialistik Cumhuriyeti) or the Soviet Socialist Republic of the Crimea was a state allied with Soviet Russia that existed in Crimea for several months in 1919 during the Russian Civil War. It was the second Bolshevik government in Crimea and its capital was Simferopol.

== Description ==
In April 1919, the Bolsheviks invaded Crimea for the second time (the first was in March 1918 and led to the creation of the short-lived Taurida Soviet Socialist Republic). After the conquest of Crimea (with the exception of the Kerch Peninsula) by the 3rd Ukrainian Red Army, a Crimean Regional Party Conference at Simferopol from 28–29 April adopted a resolution forming the Crimean Soviet Socialist Republic and a revolutionary committee government.

By 30 April, the Bolsheviks had occupied the entire peninsula and, on 5 May, the government was formed with Dmitry Ilyich Ulyanov, Vladimir Lenin's brother, as chairman. On 1 June, the Crimean SSR joined in military union with soviet republics in Russia, Ukraine, Belorussia, Lithuania, and Latvia.

The republic was declared to be a non-national entity based on the equality of all nationalities. Nationalization of industry and confiscation of the land of landlords, kulaks, and the church were implemented. The Crimean SSR was more friendly toward the interests of Crimean Tatars than the Taurida SSR had been and leftist Tatars were allowed to take positions in the government.

Starting in late May, Anton Denikin's White Volunteer Army, which had been gaining strength, threatened seizure of Crimea. On 18 June, White forces under Yakov Slashchov (Яков Слащёв) landed in the area Koktebel and, as a result, the authorities of the Crimean SSR were evacuated from Crimea from 23–26 June and the Whites assumed control of the peninsula. Crimea did not have its own government again until the formation of the South Russian Government by the Whites in February 1920.

== Soviet government ==
- Chairman of council – Dmitry Ulyanov
- Narkom of Army and Navy – Pavel Dybenko, commander of the Crimean Red Army
- Narkom of Propaganda and Agitation – Alexandra Kollontai
- Narkom of Health Care – Dmitry Ulyanov
- Narkom of People's Enlightenment – Ivan Nazukin
- Narkom of Justice – I.Ibrahimov
- Narkom of Land Cultivation – S. Idrisov
- Narkom of Foreign Affairs – S. Memetov

== See also ==
- History of Crimea
- Russian Civil War
- Post-Russian Empire states
