= Flag of Crimea =

Flag of the Republic of Crimea in Ukraine

Crimea
- Flag of the Autonomous Republic of Crimea
- Proportion: 1∶2
- Adopted: 24 September 1992 (Autonomous Republic of Crimea); 4 June 2014 (Republic of Crimea)
- Design: A horizontal tricolor of a thin blue stripe, a large white stripe, and thin red stripe.
- Designed by: A. Malgin and V. Trusov
- Flag of the Republic of Crimea

- Flag of the Crimean Tatar people

The flag of Crimea (Ukrainian: Прапор Криму, romanized: Prapor Krymu; Russian: Флаг Крыма, romanized: Flag Kryma; Crimean Tatar: Къырым байрагъы, romanized: Qırım bayrağı) is the flag of the Autonomous Republic of Crimea in Ukraine and the Republic of Crimea controlled by Russia. (Note: A March 2014 UN resolution confirming Crimea is still part of Ukraine was backed by 100 of the United Nations member states, with only 11 members rejecting it.) The flag was officially adopted on 24 September 1992 as the flag of the Republic of Crimea, readopted on 21 April 1999, then readopted on 4 June 2014 as the flag of the Republic of Crimea, annexed by the Russian Federation.

The flag is a triband, striped horizontally in blue–white–red. The blue stripe is located at the top edge and is 1/6 of the flag's width. The white stripe is the largest of the three and is 2/3 of the flag's width, and the red stripe is located at the bottom edge and is 1/6 of the flag's width.

When flown vertically, the flag's blue stripe should be at the left, the white field in the centre, and the red stripe on the right. The flag's length is twice its width.

Since the Russian invasion of Ukraine in 2022, Ukrainian authorities have increasingly used the Crimean Tatar flag (Kök Bayraq) as the de facto symbol for Crimea over the official regional tricolor. This shift is reinforced by state-supported slogans like "Two Flags – One Victory," with ongoing efforts by government and other bodies to formally make it the official flag in the future.

== History ==
Proposal no. 1

Proposal no. 2

Proposal no. 3

Proposal no. 4

After the dissolution of the Soviet Union, many designs were used by separatists from Crimea. The most commonly used design in public was a white flag with a blue outline map of Crimea, reminiscent of the flag of Cyprus. However, many Supreme Council of Crimea members had supported the version of a white flag with seven rainbow colors at the top. Crimea proclaimed self-government on 5 May 1992, but no official flag was chosen.

On 5 June 1992, five proposals were submitted to the Verkhovna Rada of Crimea (Crimean Parliament):

1. Blue–white–blue triband with large white space and narrow blue strips at the top and bottom edges of the flag.
2. White flag with seven rainbow colours at the top.
3. White over light blue field.
4. Yellow–green–blue tricolor with a same size red vertical stripe at the hoist.
5. The current blue–white–red design with the coat of arms in the center.

Proposal 5, designed by V. Trusov and A. Malgin, was selected to be the flag of Crimea. The coat of arms of G. Jefetov and V. Jagunov was recommended for display on the flag. The final design for the flag was submitted in the second session of the Verkhovna Rada of Crimea on 24 September 1992. The flag was only officially adopted on 21 April 1999.

== Crimean Tatar flag ==
During the formation of the short-lived Crimean People's Republic of the Crimean Tatars in 1917, the flag used was a sky-blue flag with a golden tamğa, known as the Kök Bayraq "Blue Banner". A green colored flag was used for religious purposes, and the red colored flag was used as the Tatar's military flag. In 1991 the light blue version is now used as ethnic flag of the Crimean Tatars. Since 2022, it has been used by Ukrainian authorities as the de facto flag of Crimea over the official tricolor.

== Color scheme ==
Color scheme (Autonomous Republic of Crimea)	Sky Blue	White	Red
CMYK	100-38-0-30	0-0-0-0	0-85-89-14
HEX	#006FB2	#FFFFFF	#DB2017
RGB	0-111-178	255-255-255	219-32-23

Color scheme (Republic of Crimea)	Blue	White	Red
CMYK	100-38-0-30	0-0-0-0	0-85-89-14
HEX	#2E2875	#FFFFFF	#DA2922
RGB	46-40-117	255-255-255	218-41-34

Color scheme (Crimean Tatar)	Light Blue	Yellow
CMYK	65-3-0-0	0-2-100-0
HEX	#41B6E6	#FFD700
RGB	65-182-230	255-215-0

== Historical flags ==
=== Crimean People's Republic (1917–1918) ===
Flag of the Milliy Firqa

Flag of the Crimean People's Republic

In 1917, the Tatar nationalist groups began using a sky-blue flag as their symbol (the color of freedom). At the same time, the tamga symbol became widely used on the blue background. This became the flag of the short-lived Crimean People's Republic proclaimed in late 1917. When the communist Taurida Soviet Socialist Republic took control of Crimea in the beginning of 1918, the Tatar flag was abolished in favour of a plain red flag.

=== Crimean Regional Government under General Sulkiewicz (1918) ===
Flag of the Crimean Regional Government under general Sulkiewicz

Naval Ensign of Crimean Regional Government

The short-lived Crimean Regional Government (Russian: Крымское краевое правительство), led by General Maciej (Suleyman) Sulkiewicz (a Lithuanian Tatar by origin), existed during the German occupation of Crimea (25 June–15 November 1918), in which the Crimean government proclaimed a self-rule. Sulkiewicz's government adopted a flag which seemed to be a compromise between Crimean Tatars and the Russians. It was a traditional Crimean Tatar blue-colored banner, but it had the coat of arms of the Russian Empire's Taurida Governorate instead of the Crimean Tatar damğa.

=== Soviet Union ===
Flag of the Crimean ASSR (1921–1929)

Flag of the Crimean ASSR (1929–1938)

Flag of the Crimean ASSR (1938–1941)

Flag of the Ukrainian SSR used by the re-established Crimean ASSR in 1991

When the Crimean ASSR was established as part of the Russian SFSR on 18 October 1921, it received its own flag. The flag was red, and spelled in golden letters were the initials of the name of the republic: in Cyrillic letters КрССР, and in the local Arabic alphabet ق س ش ج (Q.S.Ş.C.). The lettering on the flag was changed to include КрАССР, and QrMSŞÇ in the Uniform Turkic Alphabet in 1929 in order to indicate Crimea as an Autonomous Soviet Socialist Republic. The flag was amended yet again in 1938 with the lettering Cyrillic РСФСР at the top (for Russian SFSR) and КрАССР at the bottom. After Crimea was transformed into the Crimean Oblast (region) on 30 June 1945, its flag was abolished. A Crimean ASSR was re-established within the Ukrainian SSR in 1991 during the collapse of the Soviet Union.

== See also ==
- Coat of arms of Crimea
- Flag of Ukraine
- List of Ukrainian flags
- Flag of Russia
- List of Russian flags
