= Coat of arms of Crimea =

Regional coat of arms

Versions
- Lesser coat of arms

- Coat of arms of the Republic of Crimea in its Law on State Symbols
- Armiger: Autonomous Republic of Crimea; Republic of Crimea
- Adopted: 24 September 1992
- Shield: Gules, a Griffin passant Argent, holding in dexter talon an Oyster Shell also Argent, containing a Pearl Azure.
- Supporters: On either side, a Pillar Argent
- Motto: Prosperity in unity (Russian: Процветание в единстве)

Both the Ukrainian Autonomous Republic of Crimea and the Russian Republic of Crimea use the same coat of arms (Russian: Герб Крыма, Ukrainian: Герб Криму, Crimean Tatar: Къырымнынъ тугърасы, romanized: Qırımnıñ tuğrası), (Note: A March 2014 UN resolution confirming Crimea is still part of Ukraine was backed by 100 of the United Nations member states, with only 11 members rejecting it.) which has been in use since 1992.

== Description ==
The coat of arms consists of a red Varangian shield and a silver griffin passant facing to the heraldic right with an azure pearl in its right paw. On either sides of the shield are a white pillar. At the top of the shield sits the rising sun. Winding around both columns and under the shield rests the Flag of Crimea, a blue–white–red tricolor ribbon, unto which the Motto of Crimea, Процветание в единстве (translated as Prosperity in unity), is inscribed.

The Varangian shield is symbolic of the fact that the region of Crimea was for a long time a crossing of major trade routes. The red field of the coat of arms symbolizes the intense history of Crimea. The griffin is placed on the coat of arms because it is commonly used to represent the territory north of the Black Sea, and is known as the "coat of arms" of Chersonesos and Panticapaeum, where one can see the griffin on artifacts from the area.

Another variation in the symbolism is that the pearl is symbolic of Crimea as a part of Earth, and the griffin as the defender of the young republic. The pearl's azure is reminiscent of the combined culture of Crimea. The white pillars are said to be reminiscent of the ancient civilizations which inhabited the peninsula. The rising sun is symbolic of prosperity and regeneration.

== History ==
Emblem of the Crimean Autonomous Soviet Socialist Republic
- Armiger: Crimean Autonomous Soviet Socialist Republic
- Adopted: 10 November 1921
- Crest: Red star
- Supporters: Wheat
- Motto: Бютюн мемлекетлерининъ пролетарлары, бирлешинъиз! (Crimean) Пролетарии всех стран, соединяйтесь! (Russian) "Workers of the world, unite!"

On November 10, 1921, the first All-Crimean Constituent Congress of Soviets adopted the Constitution of the Crimean Soviet Socialist Republic, which contained the description of the emblem of the Crimean SSR. The emblem of the Crimean SSR is described in Article 35 of the Constitution:

The emblem of the Crimean SSR is the same with the emblem of the Russian SFSR, with an inscription on its bordering wreathin Russian and Tatar languages:

a) Kr. S.S.R.

b) Proletarians of all countries, unite!

— Constitution of the Crimean Soviet Socialist Republic (1921), Article 35.

=== First revision ===
Between 1921 and 1924, a change was made to the emblem. The Crimean Tatar inscriptions were removed from the emblem.

=== Second revision ===
After the translation of the Crimean Tatar script from Arabic into Latinized alphabet in 1928, the inscriptions in the arms of the Autonomous Crimean SSR also were made in Latinized graphics.

=== Third revision ===
In 1937, on the basis of the Constitution of the USSR of 1936 and the Constitution of the RSFSR of 1937, the Constitution of the Crimean Autonomous Soviet Socialist Republic was adopted, which contained the description of the State Emblem of the Crimean Autonomous Soviet Socialist Republic:

The State Emblem of the Crimean Autonomous Soviet Socialist Republic is the State Emblem of the RSFSR, which consists of the image of golden sickle and hammer placed crosswise, arm down, on a red background in the rays of the sun and framed by ears with the inscription" RSFSR "and “Proletarians of all countries, unite!” In the Russian and Tatar languages, with the addition of the inscription “Crimean ASSR” in the Russian and Tatar languages under the inscription “RSFSR”.

— Constitution of the Crimean Autonomous Soviet Socialist Republic (1937), Article 111

=== Fourth revision ===
In 1938, the writing system of the Crimean Tatar language was changed from Latin to Cyrillic. In accordance with this, changes also occurred in the emblem.

== Gallery ==
Principality of Theodoro
(early 14th century–1475)

Genoese Gazaria
(1266–1475)

Crimean Khanate
(1441–1783)

Taurida Governorate
(1802–1921)

Crimean People's Republic
(1917–1918)

Crimean Regional Government
(1918–1919)

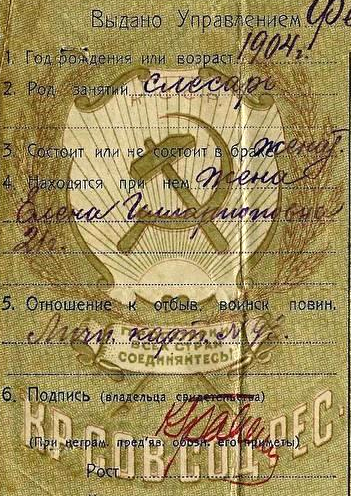
Emblem of the Crimean ASSR
(1925–1928)

Emblem of the Crimean ASSR
(1928–1937)

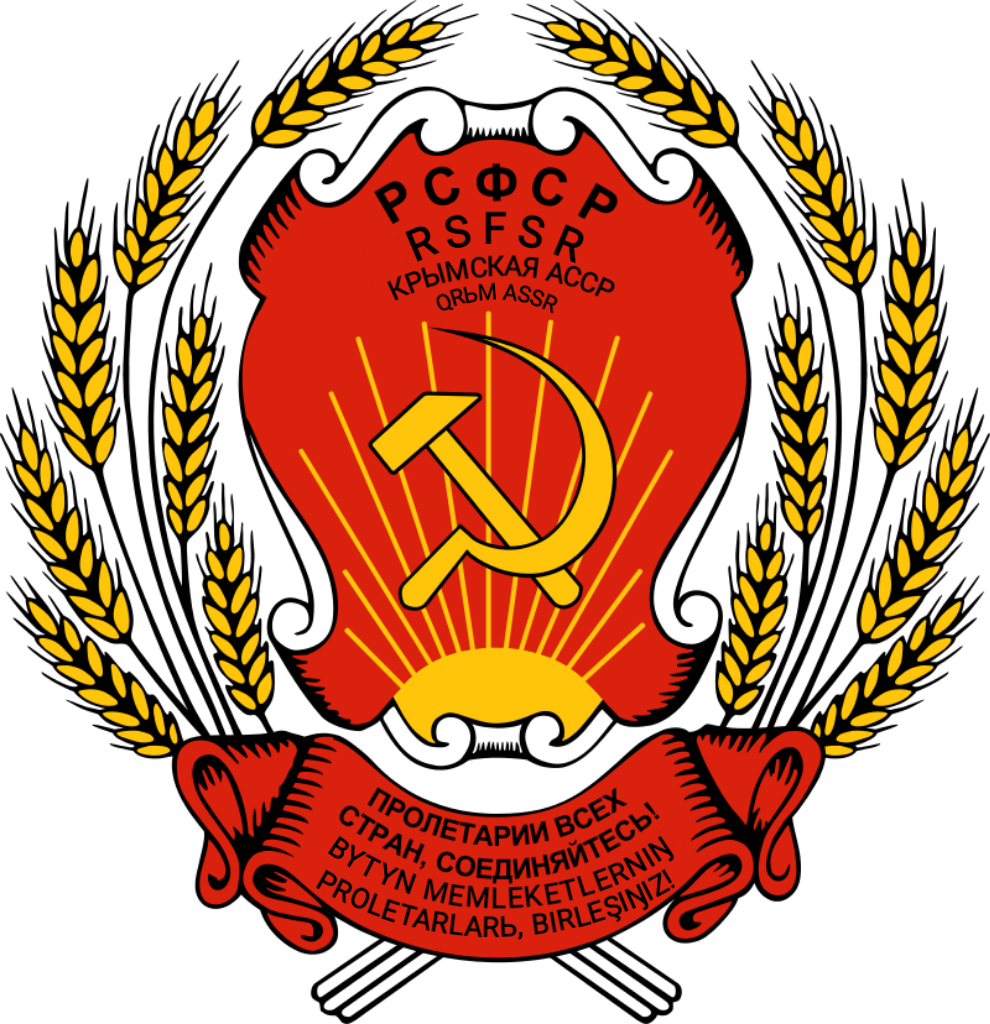
Emblem of the Crimean ASSR
(1937–1938)

Emblem of the Crimean ASSR
(1938–1945)

Emblem of the Ukrainian SSR used by the re-established Crimean ASSR in 1991

== See also ==
- Flag of Crimea
