= Solomon Krym =

Crimean politician

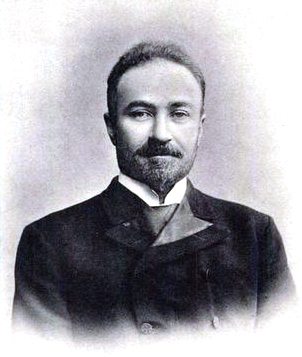
Krym in 1906

Solomon Samuilovich Krym (Russian: Соломон Самойлович Крым; 1864 – 1936) was a Crimean politician, statesman and agronomist of Crimean Karaite origin.

He was elected in 1906 to the First Duma (1906–1907) as a Kadet (Constitutional Democratic Party). He was an active member of the irregular freemasonic lodge, the Grand Orient of Russia’s Peoples.

A few months after the dismantling of the Tatar-controlled Crimean People's Republic, he was briefly the Finance Minister under the first Crimean Regional Government headed by General Suleyman Sulkiewicz. On 16 November 1918, he became the Prime Minister of the second short-lived Crimean Regional liberal, anti-separatist and anti-Soviet government. His Foreign Affairs Minister was Maxim Vinaver, another former Kadet member of the First Duma.

After the defeat of the Volunteer Army in April 1919, he emigrated and went into exile in a Russian émigrés colony at Bormes-les-Mimosas (France), building a house on the "Russian hill" there.
