= Crimean Regional Government =

Regimes in Crimean Peninsula, 1918 and 1919

Crimean Regional Government Крымское краевое правительство (Russian)
- 1918–1919
- Flag Coat of arms

- Location of Crimea.
- Status: Client state of Germany
- Capital: Simferopol
- Common languages: Russian; Crimean Tatar; Ukrainian; German
- Government: Liberal Republic
- Prime Minister
  - 1918: Maciej Sulkiewicz
  - 1918–1919: Solomon Krym
- Historical era: World War I
  - Crimean offensive: April 1918
  - First government: 25 June 1918
  - German withdrawal: November 1918
  - Second government: November 1918
  - Red Army invasion: 2 April 1919
Preceded by	Succeeded by
Taurida SSR; Crimean People's Republic	Crimean SSR; South Russia
- Today part of: Russia (disputed); Ukraine; (Note: Since the 2014 Russian annexation of Crimea the status of the Crimea and of the city of Sevastopol is under dispute between Russia and Ukraine; Ukraine and the majority of the international community considers the Crimea and Sevastopol an integral part of Ukraine, while Russia, on the other hand, considers (and administrators) the Crimea and Sevastopol an integral part of Russia.)

The Crimean Regional Government (Russian: Крымское краевое правительство, IPA: [ˈkrɨmskəje krəjɪˈvoje prɐˈvʲitʲɪlʲstvə]) refers to two successive short-lived regimes in the Crimean Peninsula during 1918 and 1919.

== History ==
Following Russia's 1917 October Revolution, an ethnic Tatar government proclaimed the Crimean People's Republic. The republic was soon overrun by Bolshevik forces in early 1918 who established the Taurida Soviet Socialist Republic and then by the forces of the Ukrainian People's Republic with a military assistance from the German Empire in the Crimean Offensive at the end of April 1918.

The first Crimean Regional Government was established on 25 June 1918. It was formed under German protection with Lipka Tatar General Maciej (Suleyman) Sulkiewicz as prime minister, minister of interior and military affairs. There were efforts by Ukraine to exert control over Crimea but, with German support, the regional government remained separate from Ukraine though, in September and October, there were talks to effect a federation of the two.

Following the withdrawal of German troops from Crimea, the unpopular Sulkiewicz fell from power on 25 November 1918 and was succeeded by Crimean Karaite politician and former Kadet member Solomon Krym. This liberal, anti-Bolshevik regime included fellow former Kadet member Maxim Vinaver as foreign minister and Vladimir D. Nabokov as minister of justice. In late November 1918, troops of the Allies of World War I, mainly French and Greek, landed in Crimea but they withdrew in April 1919, after the loss of Odessa (now Odesa).

The Krym government, also called the Crimean Frontier Government, began to crumble in early 1919 due to tensions with the Russian White movement's Volunteer Army under Anton Denikin which suspected the loyalty of its main figures. The collapse of the World War I Central Powers and the withdrawal of the Allies had made the Crimea again fully dependent on Russia.

On 2 April 1919, the Soviet Red Army occupied Simferopol and the second Crimean Regional Government was dissolved. The Crimean Socialist Soviet Republic was then established only to be retaken by White forces in June 1919. The Whites under Denikin and later Pyotr Wrangel held Crimea until November 1920.

== See also ==
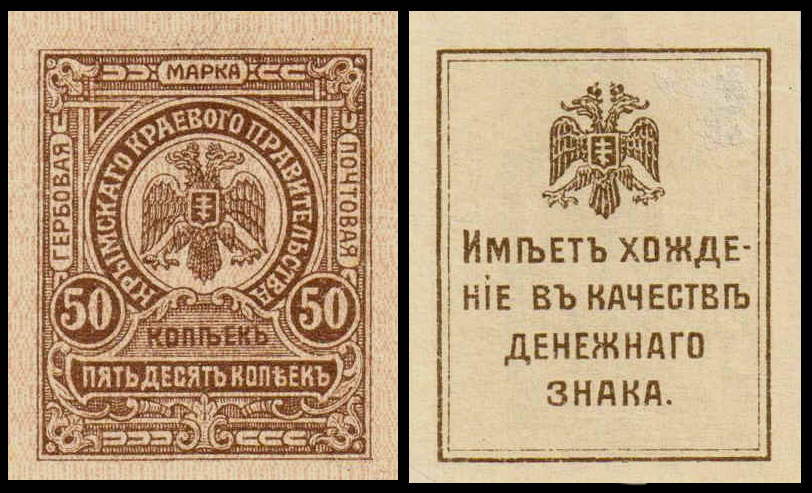
Crimean Regional Government postage stamp, 1919

- Post-Russian Empire states
- Russian Civil War
