= Maxim Vinaver =

Russian lawyer and politician (1863–1926)

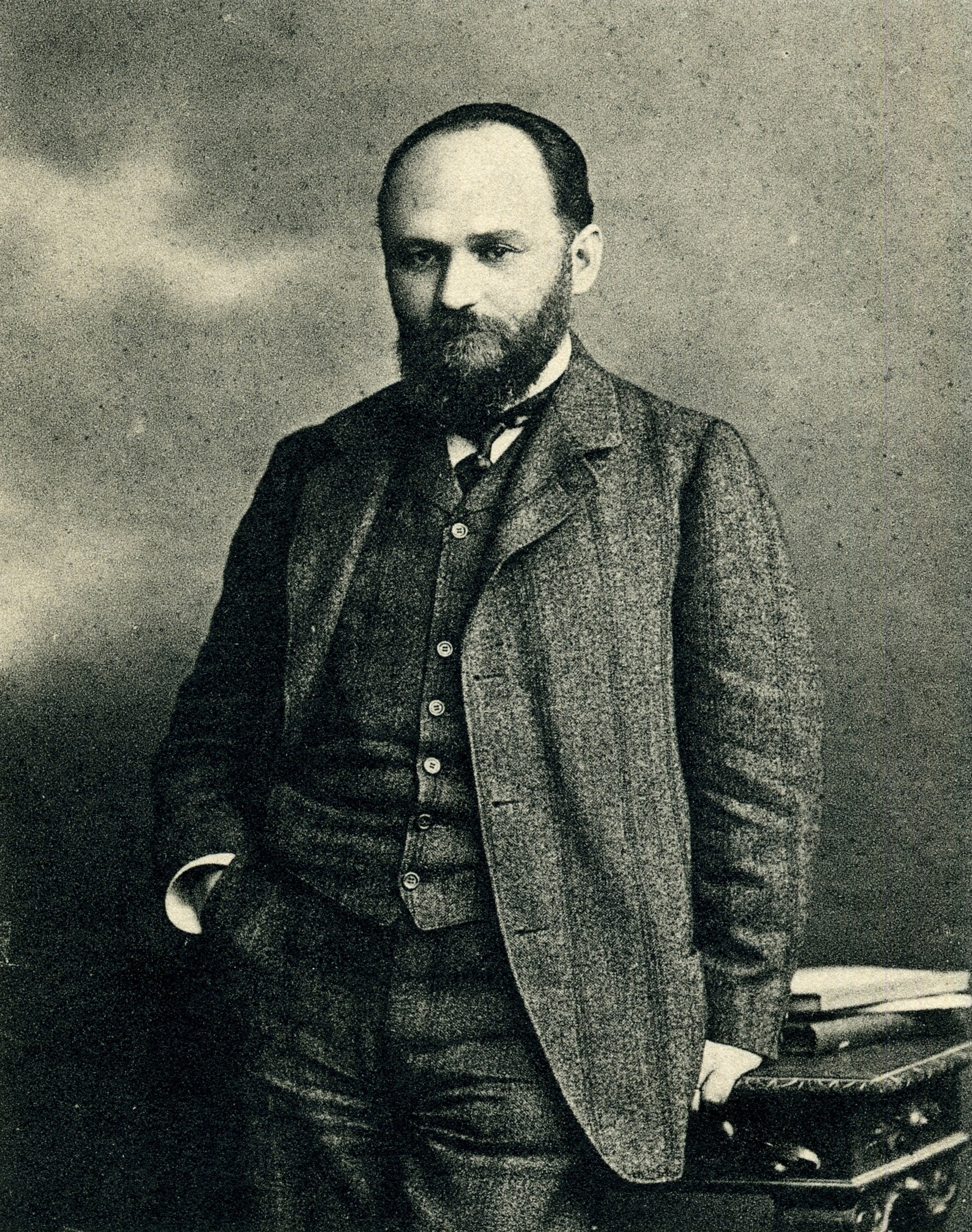
Vinaver in 1906

Maxim Moisseyevitsch Vinaver (Russian: Максим Моисеевич Винавер; 30 November [O.S. 18 November] 1863, Warsaw – 11 October 1926) was a Russian lawyer, politician, and patron.

== Early life ==
Vinaver was born in Warsaw. His father, Moishe-Leib Abramovych Vynaver (1831–1905), was a Jewish shopkeeper.

After graduating from the 3rd Warsaw Gymnasium, Vinaver studied law from 1881 to 1886 at the University of Warsaw.

== Career ==
Vinaver lived in Saint Petersburg and worked as an assistant to a lawyer due to the de facto prohibition of admitting lawyers of Jewish faith. During this time, he became known as a legal scholar by publishing articles in legal journals. Later, he began developing the defenses in criminal cases resulting from anti-Semitism. In 1900, he organized the successful defense in the Vilna trial of David Blondes, who was charged with ritual murder. In 1904, during a civil suit in Gomel called "The Jewish Victims", in which he led a group of lawyers, Vinaver resigned after accusing the judge of being biased and leaving the trial. It was only in July 1904 that he was sworn in as a lawyer.

Vinaver lectured on social science at the New University of Brussels and at the Paris School of Social Sciences. He became a member of the Legal Society of the University of St. Petersburg and from 1904 to 1906 headed the civil law department of the editorial office of the newspaper Rechtskurier der Gesellschaft. In 1909, he participated in the editing of the work of the St. Petersburg Legal Society. In 1913–1917, he issued the civil law courier.

Vinaver participated in the Society for Education of Russian Jews and became chairman of the Historical and Ethnographic Commission. During the revolution of 1905, he was one of the founders of the Union for Full Rights of the Jewish People in Russia in March 1905, and in 1907 he founded the Jewish Folk Group. He collected paintings and worked as a patron. In particular, in 1907, Vinaver helped Marc Chagall start his painting career, assisting him financially and arranging housing for him in the editorial office of Voskhod magazine. He then supported Chagall with a small scholarship so that he could travel to Paris in September 1910. Later, Chagall wrote that Vinaver made him an artist.

In 1905, he was also one of the founders, leaders, and theorists of the Constitutional Democratic Party, which was called the party of the Cadets. He became a member of its Central Committee and a deputy in the First State Duma. After the dissolution of the Duma in 1906, he was among the signatories of the Vyborg Manifesto. Because of this, he was condemned to three months of imprisonment.

After the February Revolution, Vinaver joined the Working Group on drafting laws for the election of a Constituent Assembly, and the Provisional Government appointed him Senator of the Civil Division of the Senate Court of Cassation. He was a member of the new Central Duma. During this time, he tended to the left wing of the Cadet Party, and he was Deputy Group Chairman in the Provisional Soviet of the Russian Republic. In 1917, he was elected to the Constituent Assembly of Petrograd (Saint Petersburg). From March 1917, he was the Head of the Commission for Agitation and Publication of the Cadets Party together with the historian Alexander Alexandrovich Kornilov. He was also one of the editors of the newspaper Kurier of the People's Liberty Party.

Even before the October Revolution and after an illegal stay in Moscow, Vinaver fled to Crimea and took part in the conference of the Cadets on 1 October 1918 in Gaspra. In the spring of 1919, he became Foreign Minister of the Regional Crimean Government, which turned against the Bolsheviks to the Entente powers.

In 1919, Vinaver emigrated to France and settled in Paris, where he called on Russia’s allies to continue supporting the White movement. He was a friend of the chairman of the Committee of the Paris Group of Cadets, and joined the emigrants’ unified democratic forces. He served as chairman of the Russian Publishing Society in Paris, co-founding the Russian newspaper Recent News. He also helped publish the newspaper Jewish Tribune that decried anti-Semitism. He initiated construction of a Russian university at the Sorbonne, where he gave a lecture on Russian civil law. He played a large part in the trial of Sholem Schwarzbard — who had shot former Ukrainian President Symon Petliura in Paris in 1926 — as a witness for the defense.

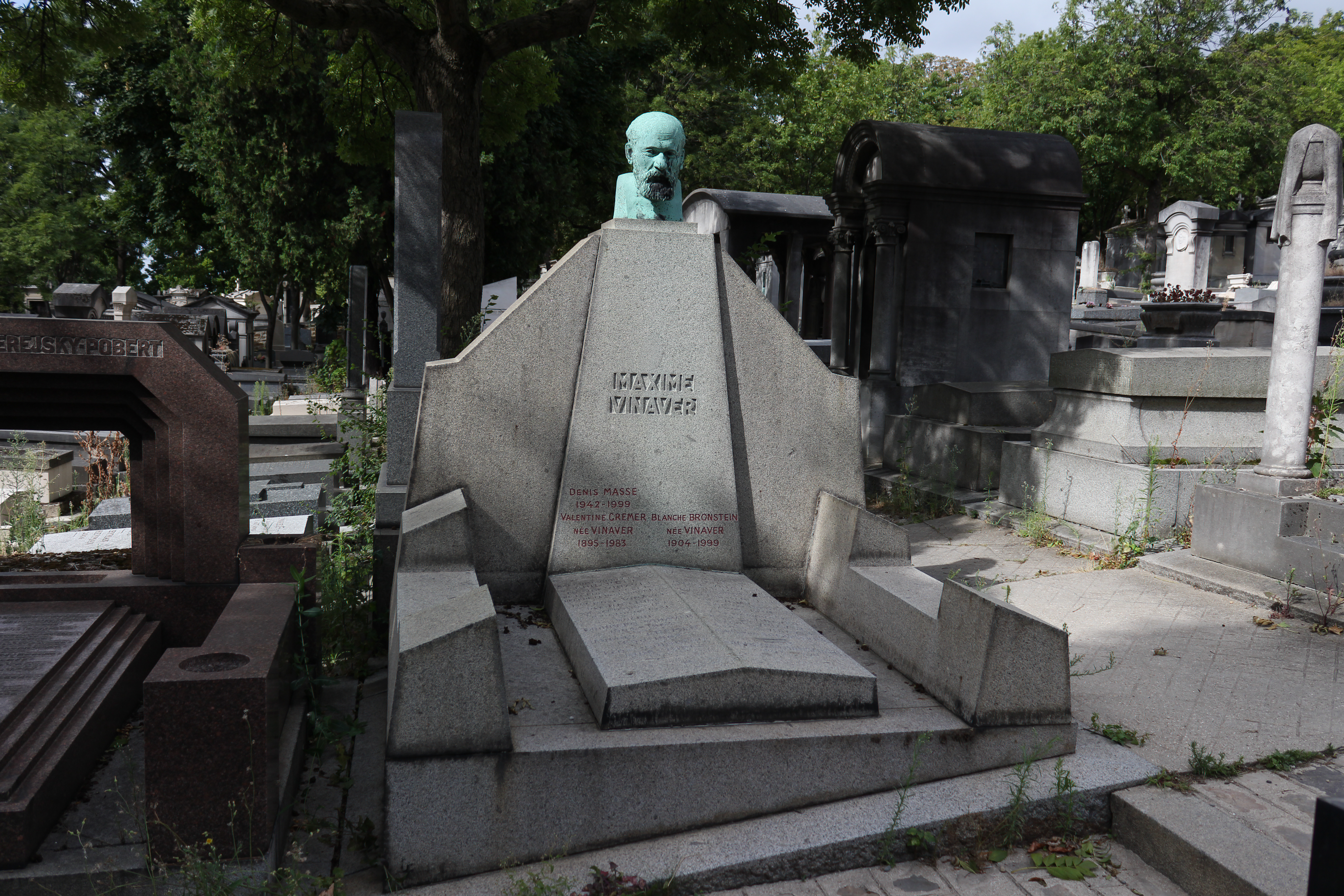
Grave of Maxim Vinaver

== Family ==
Vinaver was married and had three children: the radiologist Valentina Maximovna Vinaver Kremer (1895–1983); the literary historian and founder of the International Arthurian Society Eugène Vinaver (1899–1979); and the lawyer Sofia Maximovna Vinaver Grinberg (1904–1964), who married Leo Adolfowich Grinberg (1900–1981).

== Death ==
Maxim Vinaver died in his home in Menthon-Saint-Bernard on the night of October 11th, 1926. He was buried as "Maxime Vinaver" at the Paris cemetery Père Lachaise.
