= Revolutionary committee (Soviet) =

Early provisional governing administrations of Soviet regions

A revolutionary committee or revkom (Russian: Революционный комитет, ревком) were Bolshevik-led organizations in Soviet Russia and other Soviet republics established to serve as provisional governments and temporary Soviet administrations in territories under the control of the Red Army in 1918–1920, during the Russian Civil War and foreign military intervention. The forms of their work were inherited from Military Revolutionary Committees of the Russian Revolution of 1917. The name was borrowed from the history of the French Revolution, where comités révolutionnaires were created, the superior ones being the Committee of Public Safety and Committee of General Security.

Revolutionary committees were often created in anticipation of the advances of the Red Army. In some cases they were created in places remote from the intended place of action, as was the case with the Provisional Polish Revolutionary Committee. In other cases they were created underground from local populations under the guidance of Bolsheviks, subsequently organizing an insurgency and then inviting the Red Army for help, as in the case of the Azerbaijani Revkom, which seized power in Baku when English troops were evacuated and then asked Moscow for help.

Some revkoms were successful, while others were not.

There were different levels of revkoms, according to the administrative divisions: republican, inherited from the Russian Empire (guberniya, uyezd, volost), and at the grassroots level rural revkoms.

According to the decree of VTsIK (central Soviet legislative body), On Revolutionary Committees (October 24, 1919), there were three major types of revkoms:

- in areas taken over by the Red Army
- in front areas
- in rear areas

In most territories all lower level revkoms were abolished by January 1920, with some exceptions:

- in 1920: in Arkhangelsk guberniya (February–April), in Volga Germans area (February), in Central Asia, Ukraine, Kuban, Belarus, Dagestan, Azerbaijan.
- in 1921: Armenia, Georgia
- in Siberia, Siberian Revkom (Sibrevkom) existed until 1925.

== See also ==
- Poor Peasants Committee
