= Maciej Sulkiewicz =

Belarusian-born Russian, Crimean, and Azerbaijani military commander and politician

- Мацей Сулькевіч
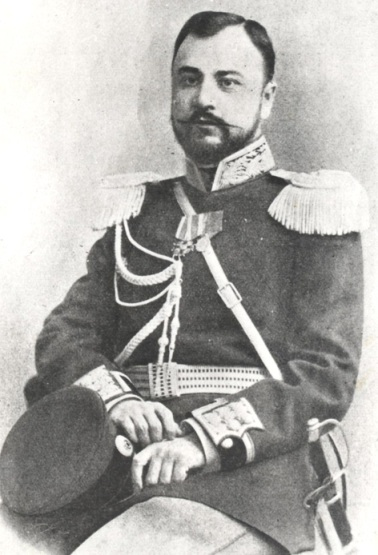

Chief of General Staff of Azerbaijani Armed Forces
- In office 26 March 1919 – December 1919
- Preceded by: Habib Bey Salimov
- Succeeded by: Abdulhamid Bey Gaytabashi

Personal details
- Born: 20 June 1865 Kiemiejšy, Vilna Governorate, Russian Empire (present-day Belarus)
- Died: 15 July 1920 (aged 55) Baku, Azerbaijan Democratic Republic

Military service
- Branch/service: Imperial Russian Army (1883–1918); Azerbaijani Armed Forces (1918–1920)
- Years of service: 1883 – 1920
- Rank: Lieutenant General
- Battles/wars: Boxer Rebellion; Russo-Japanese War; World War I Russian Civil War

Maciej (Suleyman bey) Sulkiewicz (Belarusian: Мацей Аляксандравіч Сулькевіч, romanized: Maciej Aliaksandravič Sulkievič, Azerbaijani: Süleyman bəy Sulkeviç, Russian: Матвей (Магомет) Сулькевич, romanized: Matvey (Magomet) Sulkevich; 20 June 1865 – 15 July 1920) was an Imperial Russian lieutenant general, Prime Minister of Crimean Regional Government (1918), and Chief of General Staff of Azerbaijani Armed Forces in 1918–20.

== Biography ==
Born to parents of Lipka Tatar origin, he changed his name to Mohammad after settling in Azerbaijan Democratic Republic, but in Azerbaijan he is still known as Suleyman bey Sulkiewicz and Mammad bey Sulkiewicz.

He joined the Imperial Russian Army in 1883 and became an officer in 1886. He was promoted to major general in 1910 and to lieutenant general in 1915. Sulkiewicz participated in the Chinese expedition against the Boxers, in the Russo-Japanese War and World War I. Before the Russo–Japanese War he served in the Odessa Military District in 1894–1905 and served as a chief of staff at the Ochakov Fortress. During the Russo–Japanese War, Sulkiewicz fought at the Battle of Mukden as a member of the 8th Army Corps of the 2nd Manchurian Army, commanding the 57th Modlin Infantry Regiment. During his tour at the Far East, Sulkiewicz was honored with several orders of Imperial Russia such as the Order of Saint Anna, the Order of Saint Vladimir, and the Golden Weapon for Bravery. After the Russo–Japanese War, he remained in the Asian portion of Russia serving in the Irkutsk Military District.

During the World War I, he fought at the Romanian Front. In the late 1917 Sulkiewicz was involved in creation of the 1st Muslim Army Corps, yet remained at the service of the Russian Romanian Front administration. Upon signing of the Treaty of Brest-Litovsk between the Soviet Russia and the Central powers, Sulkiewicz came to Crimea with the Central powers occupational forces which forced Bolshevik irregular formations out of Crimea and formed the Crimean Regional Government as interim government in Crimea under the German occupying forces. As a provisional governor of Crimea, Sulkiewicz negotiated with the Ukrainian government a federative relations between mainland Ukraine and Crimea. After the end of World War I and withdrawal of the Central powers troops out of Crimea in late 1918, Sulkiewicz moved to Azerbaijan and became Chief of Staff of Azerbaijani Armed Forces of ADR on 26 March 1919.

He was executed by the Bolsheviks, after the Bolshevik invasion of Azerbaijan in 1920.

== Gallery ==
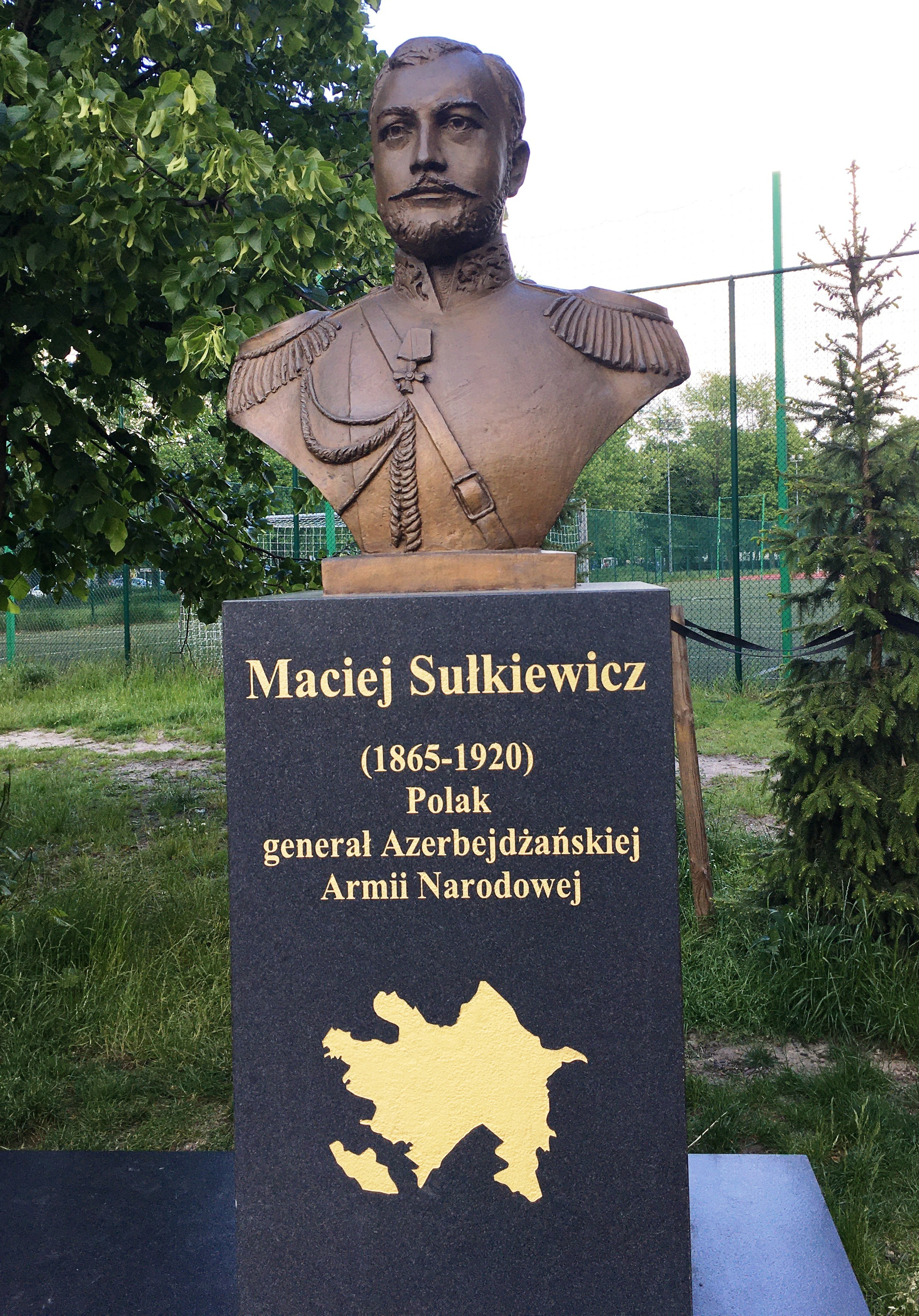
Bust of General Sulkiewicz in Warsaw
