= List of diplomatic missions of Ukraine =

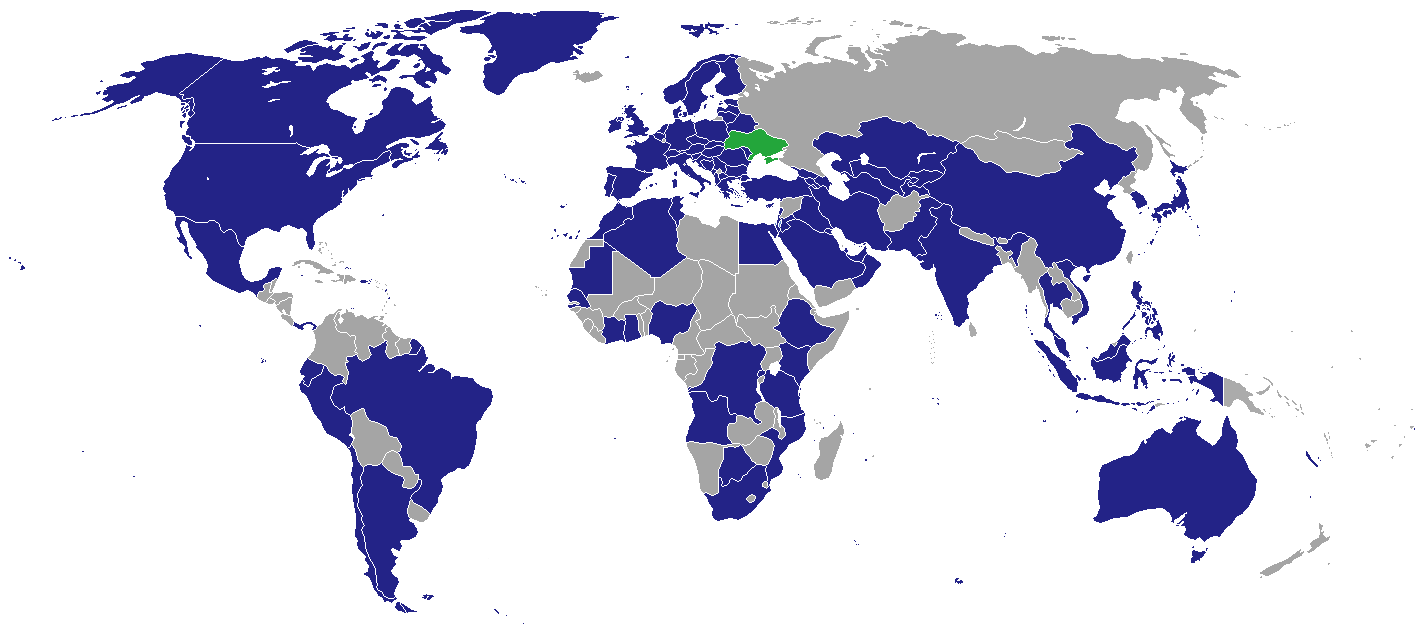
Map of countries that host diplomatic missions of Ukraine

This is a list of diplomatic missions of Ukraine.

== History ==
Ukraine opened 18 diplomatic missions in 1992:

- Embassies in Austria, Belgium, Belarus, Canada, Czech Republic, Finland, Germany, Greece, Georgia, Hungary, Italy, Israel, Iran, United Kingdom, United States, Poland, Russia, Romania.
- General Consulates in New York City, Chicago, and Munich.

In 1993, 15 diplomatic missions were opened:

- Embassies in Argentina, Bulgaria, China, Estonia, Egypt, France, Guinea, India, Lithuania, Moldova, Switzerland, Slovakia, Uzbekistan, United Arab Emirates and the Consulate General in Toronto.

In 1994, embassies were opened in Kazakhstan, Cuba, Turkey, and consulates-general in Gdansk and Istanbul.

== Current missions ==
=== Africa ===
| Host country | Host city | Mission | Concurrent accreditation | Ref. |
|---|---|---|---|---|
| Algeria | Algiers | Embassy | Countries: Mali (Note: Ukraine established diplomatic relations with Mali in 1992, but severed them in 2024.); Consular jurisdiction only: Niger (Note: Niger is listed only under the consular jurisdiction of the Ukrainian Embassy in Algiers. Diplomatic relations are conducted from the Ukrainian Embassy in Rabat. Ukraine established diplomatic relations with Niger in 1999, but severed them in 2024.) | |
| Angola | Luanda | Embassy | Countries: Congo-Brazzaville | |
| Botswana | Gaborone | Embassy | Multilateral Organizations: Southern African Development Community | |
| Congo-Kinshasa | Kinshasa | Embassy | | |
| Egypt | Cairo | Embassy | Countries: Eritrea; Sudan | |
| Ethiopia | Addis Ababa | Embassy | Countries: Djibouti; Seychelles; South Sudan; International Organizations: African Union (Note: Accredited as an observer mission.) | |
| Ghana | Accra | Embassy | | |
| Ivory Coast | Abidjan | Embassy | | |
| Kenya | Nairobi | Embassy | Countries: Burundi; Comoros; Malawi; Somalia; Uganda; International Organizations: United Nations; United Nations Environment Programme; United Nations Human Settlements Programme | |
| Mauritania | Nouakchott | Embassy | | |
| Morocco | Rabat | Embassy | Countries: Central African Republic; Niger (Note: Ukraine established diplomatic relations with Niger in 1999, but severed them in 2024.) | |
| Mozambique | Maputo | Embassy | | |
| Nigeria | Abuja | Embassy | Countries: Benin; Cameroon; Gabon; Togo; Consular jurisdiction only: São Tomé and Príncipe (Note: São Tomé and Príncipe is listed only under the consular jurisdiction of the Ukrainian Embassy in Abuja. Diplomatic relations are conducted from the Ukrainian Embassy in Lisbon.) | |
| Rwanda | Kigali | Embassy | | |
| Senegal | Dakar | Embassy | Countries: Gambia; Guinea; Guinea-Bissau; Liberia; Sierra Leone; Consular jurisdiction only: Equatorial Guinea (Note: Equatorial Guinea is listed only under the consular jurisdiction of the Ukrainian Embassy in Dakar. Diplomatic relations are conducted from the Ukrainian Embassy in Madrid.); Cape Verde (Note: Cape Verde is listed only under the consular jurisdiction of the Ukrainian Embassy in Dakar. Diplomatic relations are conducted from the Ukrainian Embassy in Lisbon.) | |
| South Africa | Pretoria | Embassy | Countries: Eswatini; Lesotho; Madagascar; Mauritius; Namibia; Zambia; Zimbabwe | |
| Tanzania | Dar Es Salaam | Embassy | | |
| Tunisia | Tunis | Embassy | Countries: Chad; Burkina Faso; Libya; Consular jurisdiction only: Central African Republic (Note: The Central African Republic is listed only under the consular jurisdiction of the Ukrainian Embassy in Tunis. Diplomatic relations are conducted from the Ukrainian Embassy in Rabat.) | |

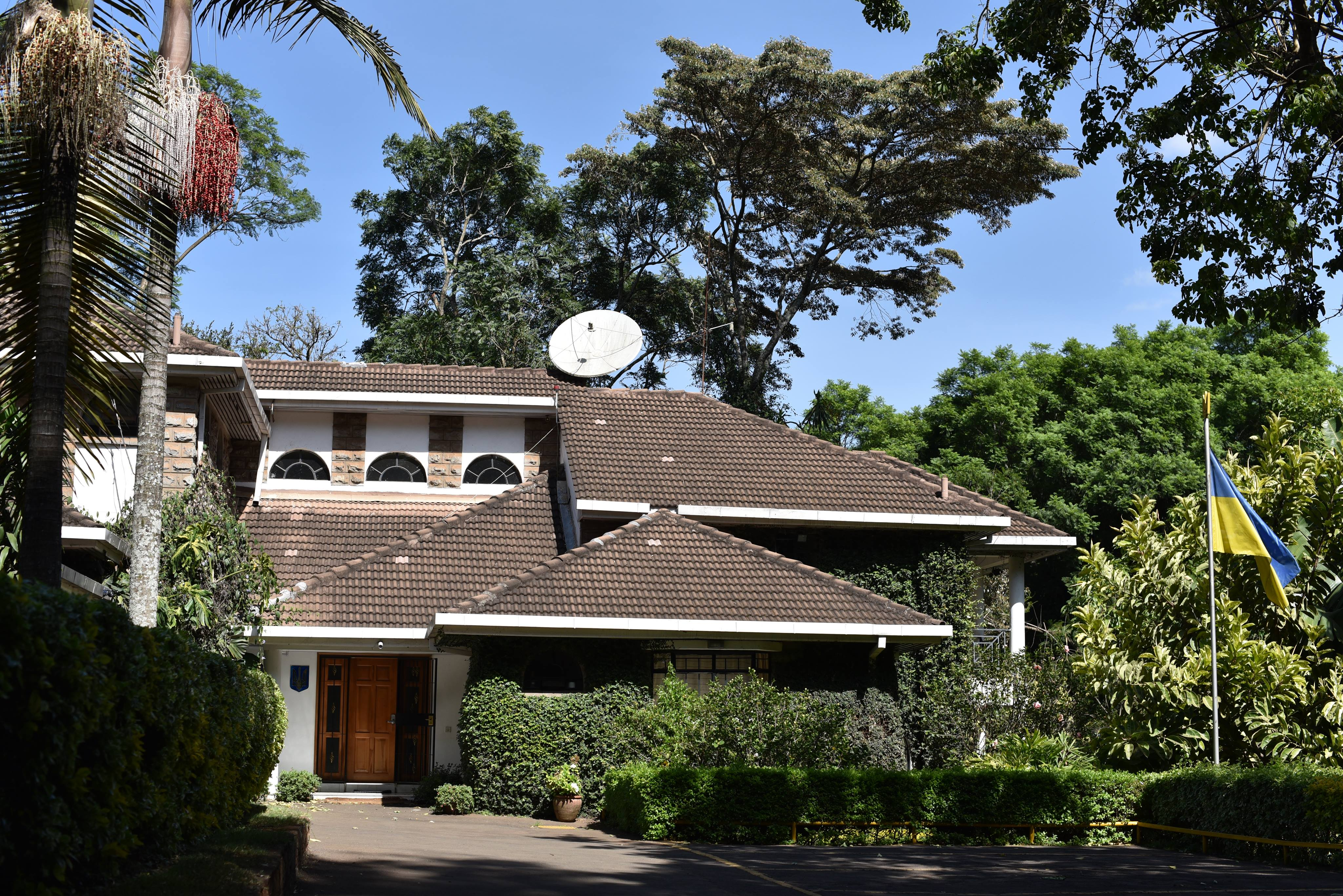
Embassy in Nairobi

=== Americas ===
| Host country | Host city | Mission | Concurrent accreditation | Ref. |
|---|---|---|---|---|
| Argentina | Buenos Aires | Embassy | Countries: Paraguay; Uruguay | |
| Brazil | Brasília | Embassy | Countries: Bolivia; Guyana; Suriname | |
| Canada | Ottawa | Embassy | | |
| Canada | Edmonton | Consulate-General | | |
| Canada | Toronto | Consulate-General | | |
| Chile | Santiago de Chile | Embassy | | |
| Ecuador | Quito | Embassy | | |
| Mexico | Mexico City | Embassy | Countries: Belize; Costa Rica; Guatemala | |
| Panama | Panama City | Embassy | | |
| Peru | Lima | Embassy | Countries: Colombia | |
| United States | Washington, D.C. | Embassy | Countries: Antigua and Barbuda; Jamaica; International Organizations: Organization of American States | |
| United States | Chicago | Consulate-General | Countries: Antigua and Barbuda; Jamaica; International Organizations: Organization of American States | |
| United States | Houston | Consulate-General | Countries: Antigua and Barbuda; Jamaica; International Organizations: Organization of American States | |
| United States | New York City | Consulate-General | Countries: Antigua and Barbuda; Jamaica; International Organizations: Organization of American States | |
| United States | San Francisco | Consulate-General | Countries: Antigua and Barbuda; Jamaica; International Organizations: Organization of American States | |

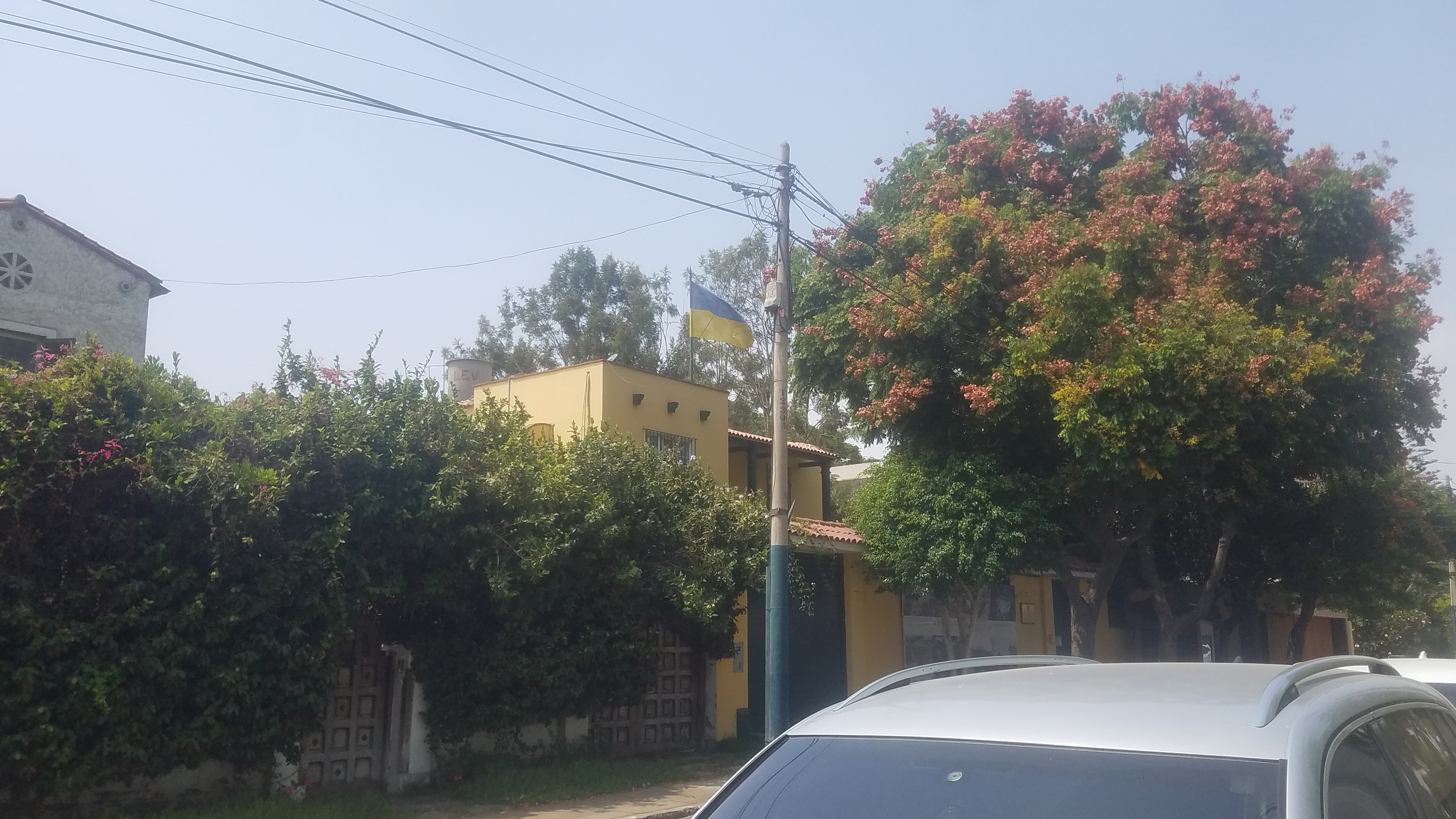
Embassy in Lima

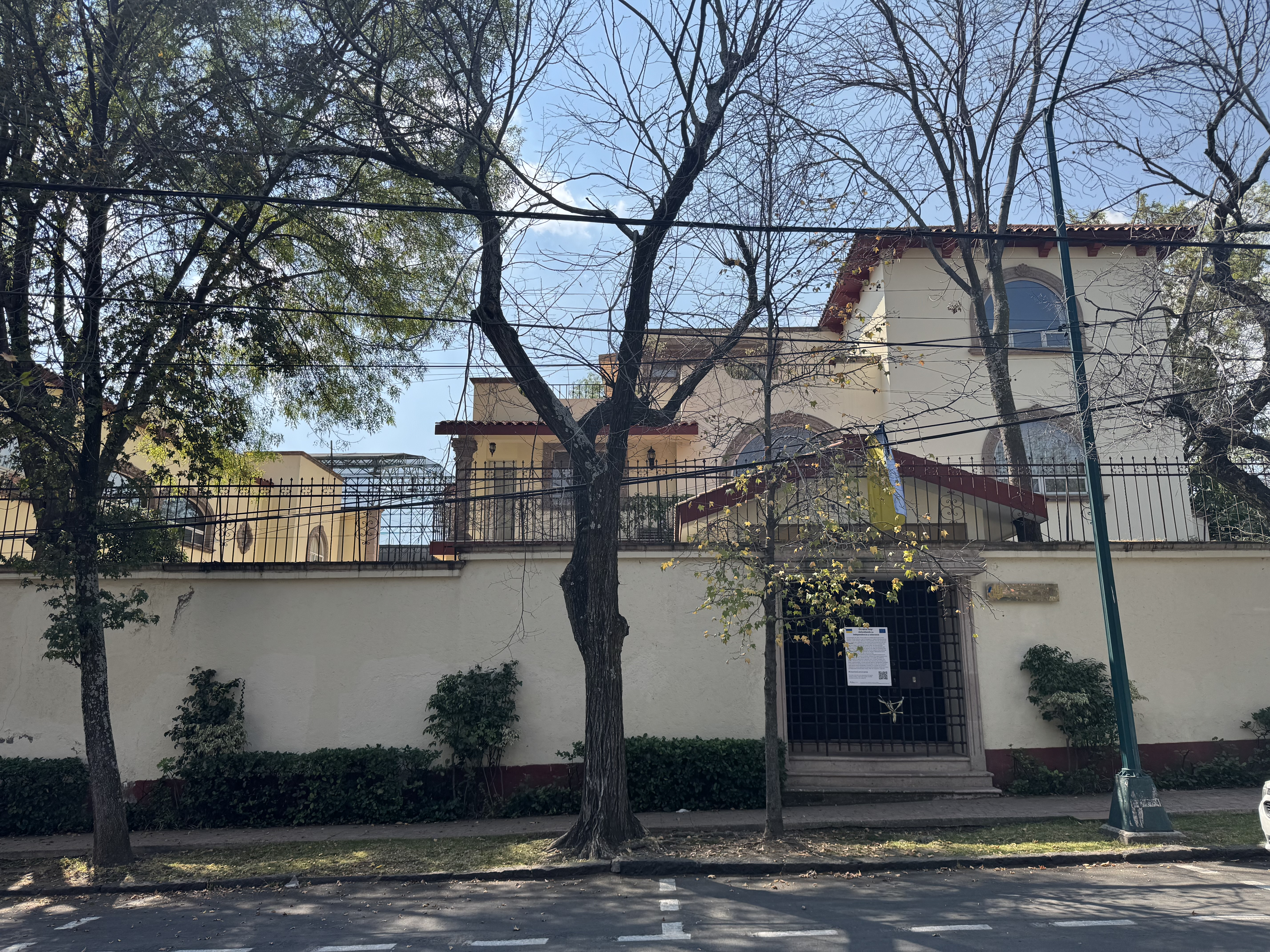
Embassy in Mexico City

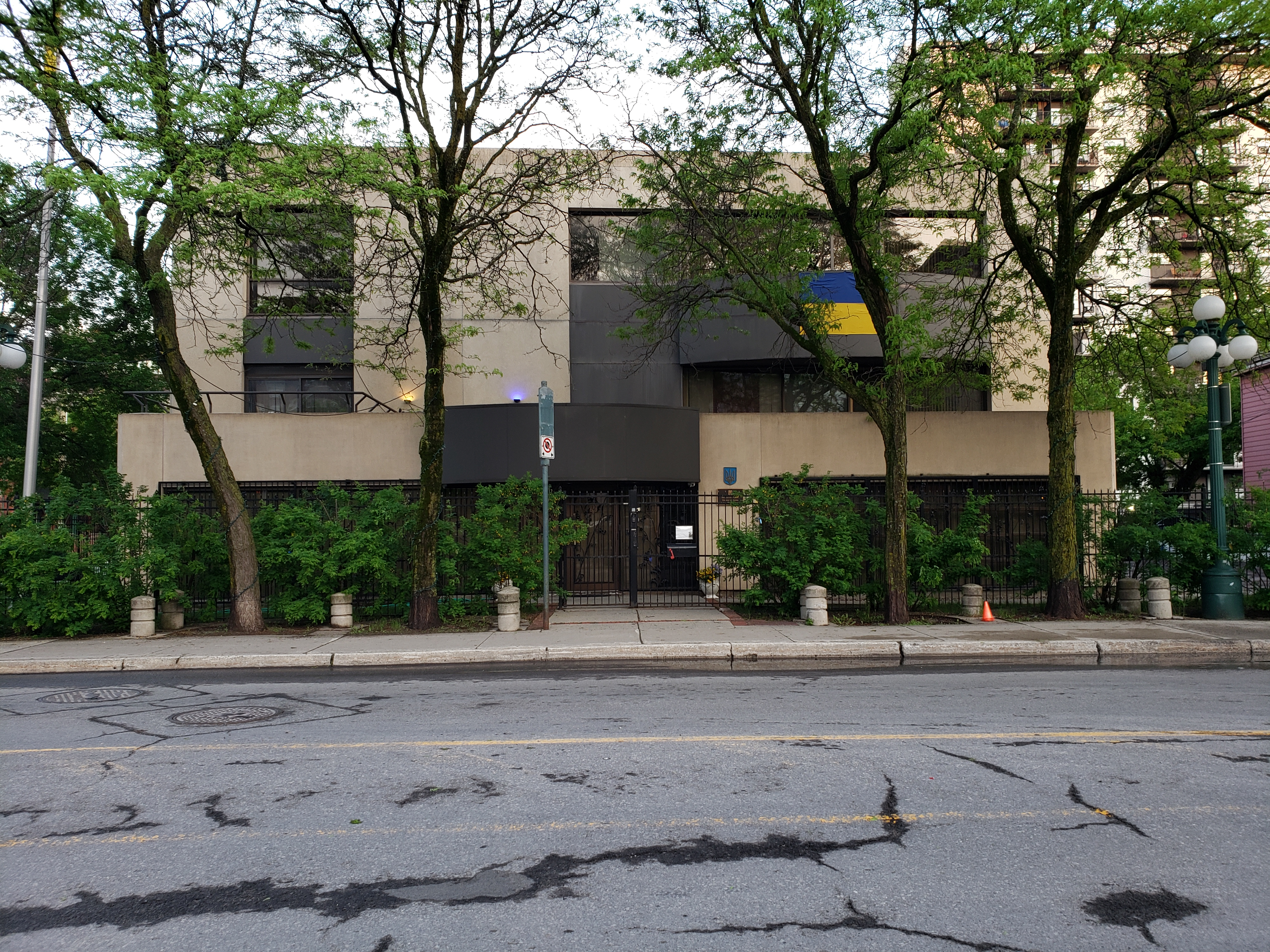
Embassy in Ottawa

Building hosting the Consulate-General in Edmonton

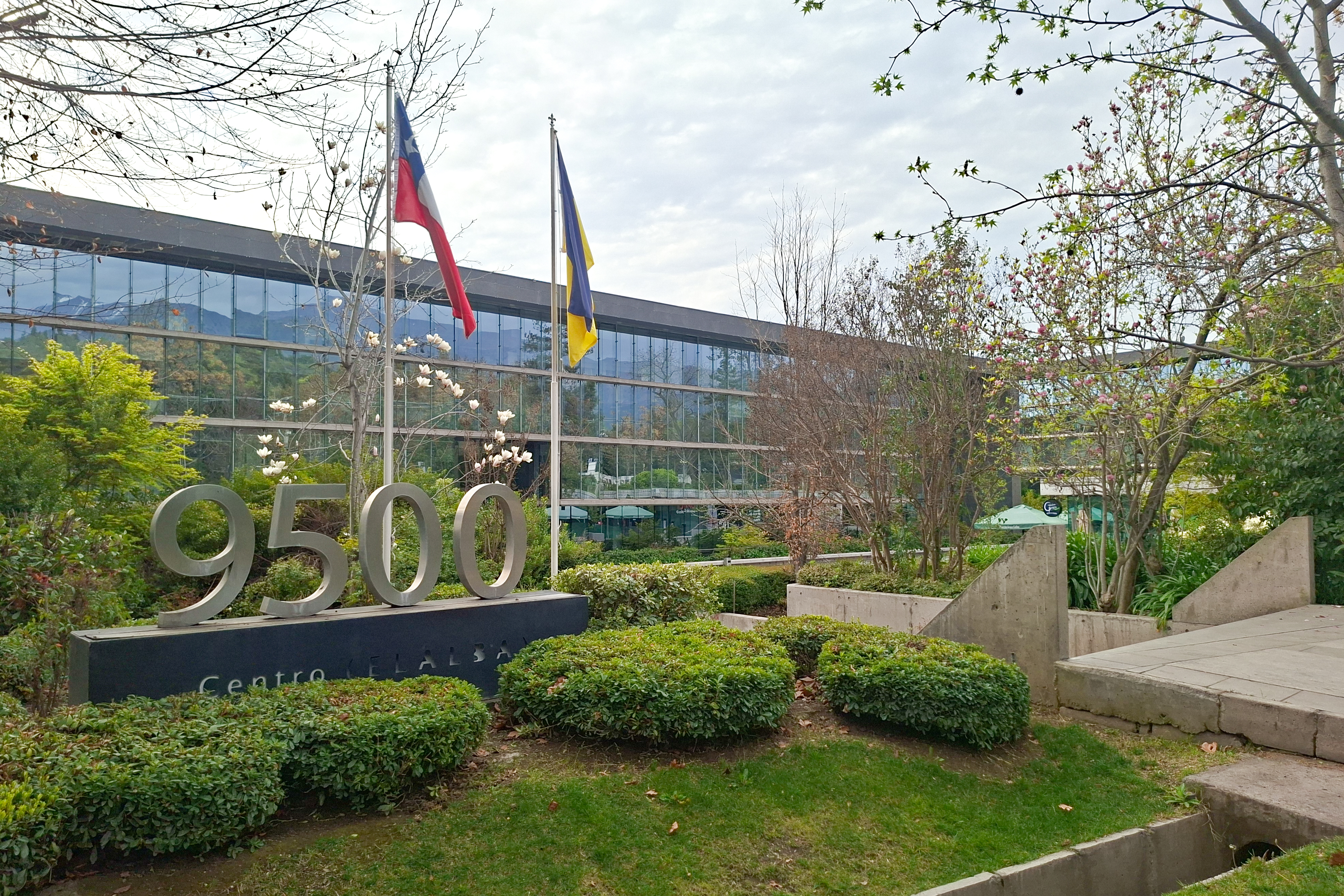
Embassy in Santiago de Chile

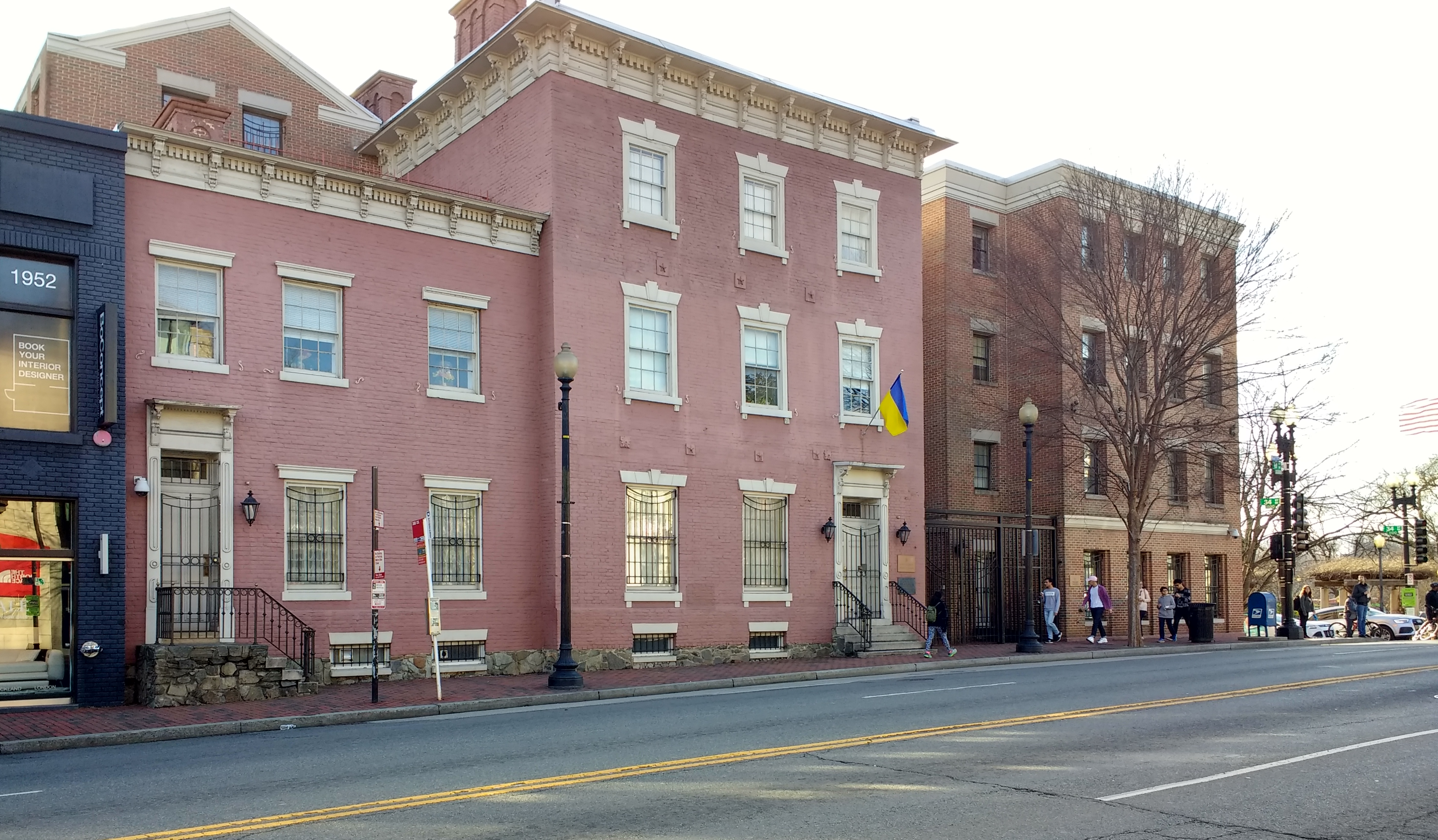
Embassy in Washington, D.C.

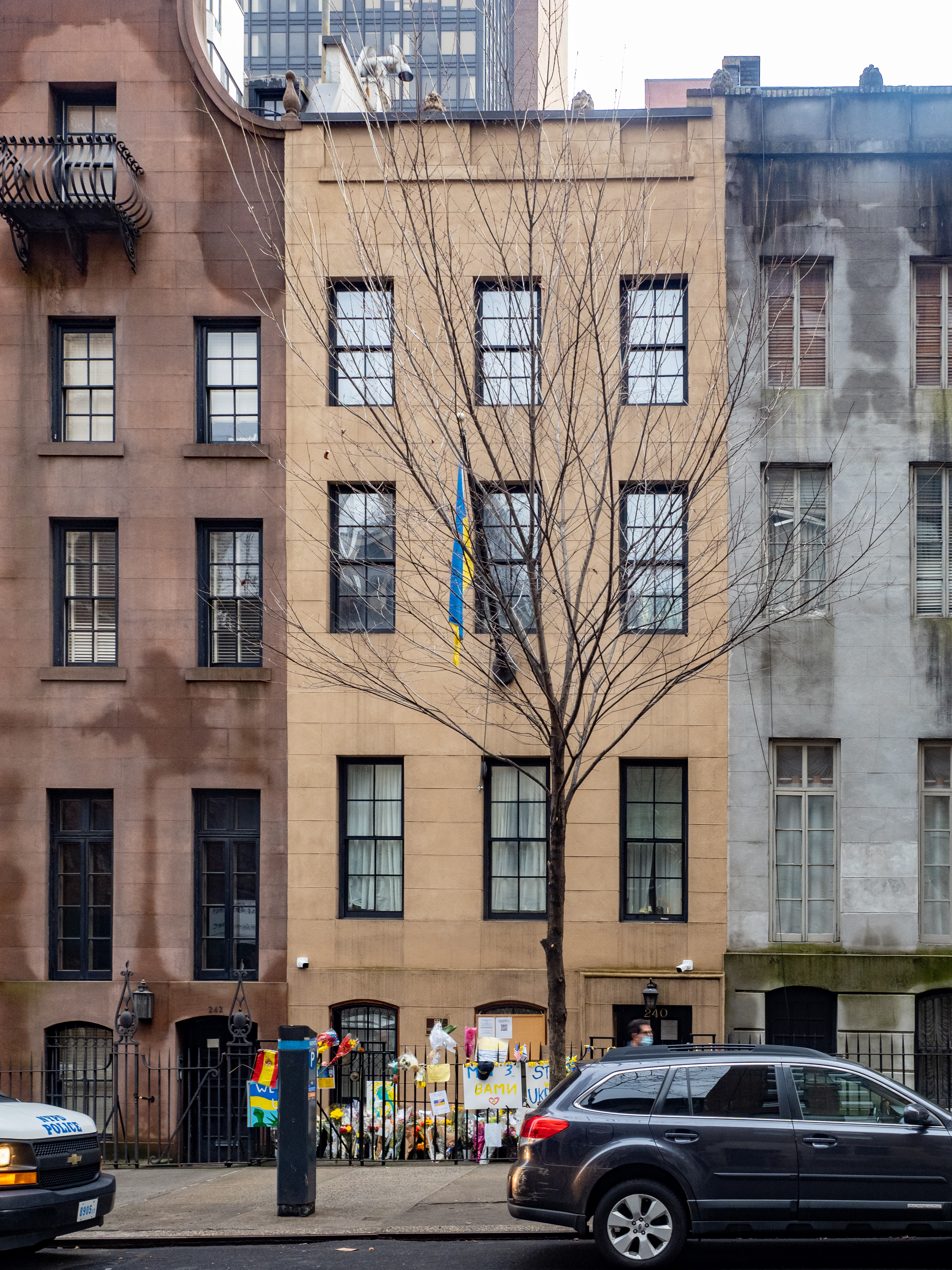
Consulate-General in New York City

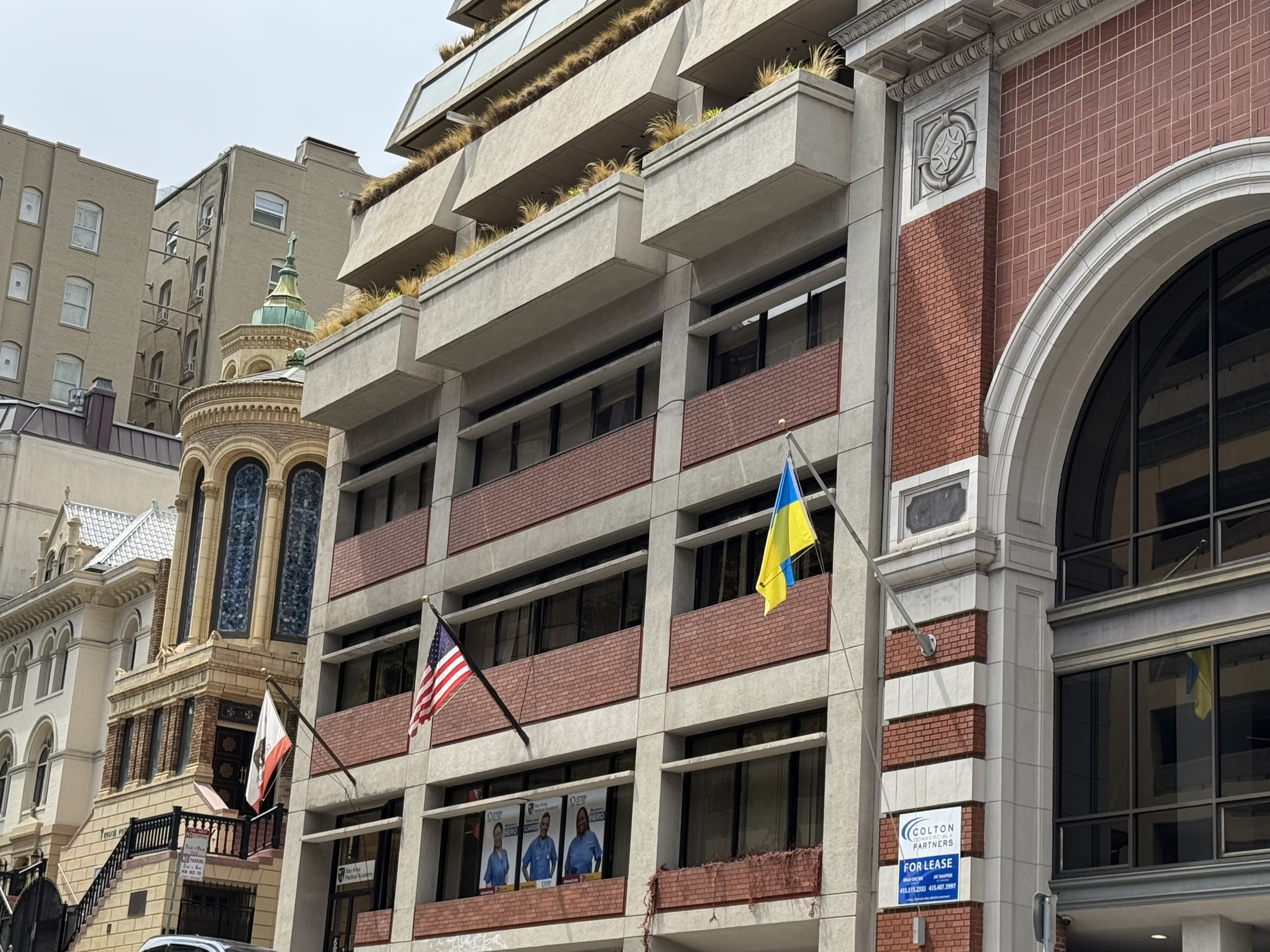
Consulate-General in San Francisco

=== Asia ===
| Host country | Host city | Mission | Concurrent accreditation | Ref. |
|---|---|---|---|---|
| Armenia | Yerevan | Embassy | | |
| Azerbaijan | Baku | Embassy | | |
| China | Beijing | Embassy | Countries: Mongolia | |
| China | Guangzhou | Consulate-General | Countries: Mongolia | |
| China | Shanghai | Consulate-General | Countries: Mongolia | |
| Georgia | Tbilisi | Embassy | | |
| India | New Delhi | Embassy | Countries: Bangladesh; Maldives; Nepal; Sri Lanka; Consular jurisdiction only: Bhutan (Note: Bhutan is listed under the consular jurisdiction of the Ukrainian embassy in New Delhi; the two countries have yet to establish formal diplomatic relations.) | |
| India | Mumbai | Consulate-General | Countries: Bangladesh; Maldives; Nepal; Sri Lanka; Consular jurisdiction only: Bhutan | |
| Indonesia | Jakarta | Embassy | Countries: Papua New Guinea; Multilateral Organizations: Association of Southeast Asian Nations | |
| Iran | Tehran | Embassy | | |
| Iraq | Baghdad | Embassy | | |
| Israel | Tel Aviv | Embassy | | |
| Japan | Tokyo | Embassy | Countries: Marshall Islands; Micronesia; Palau | |
| Jordan | Amman | Embassy | | |
| Kazakhstan | Astana | Embassy | | |
| Kuwait | Kuwait City | Embassy | | |
| Kyrgyzstan | Bishkek | Embassy | | |
| Lebanon | Beirut | Embassy | Countries: Syria | |
| Malaysia | Kuala Lumpur | Embassy | Countries: Timor-Leste | |
| Oman | Muscat | Embassy | | |
| Pakistan | Islamabad | Embassy | | |
| Palestine | Ramallah | Representative office | | |
| Philippines | Manila | Embassy | | |
| Qatar | Doha | Embassy | | |
| Saudi Arabia | Riyadh | Embassy | Countries: Yemen | |
| Singapore | Singapore | Embassy | Countries: Brunei | |
| South Korea | Seoul | Embassy | | |
| Tajikistan | Dushanbe | Embassy | Countries: Afghanistan | |
| Thailand | Bangkok | Embassy | Countries: Laos; Myanmar | |
| Turkey | Ankara | Embassy | | |
| Turkey | Istanbul | Consulate-General | | |
| Turkey | Antalya | Consulate (Note: To be elevated into a consulate-general.) | | |
| Turkmenistan | Ashgabat | Embassy | | |
| United Arab Emirates | Abu Dhabi | Embassy | Countries: Bahrain; Multilateral Organizations: International Renewable Energy Agency | |
| United Arab Emirates | Dubai | Consulate | Countries: Bahrain; Multilateral Organizations: International Renewable Energy Agency | |
| Uzbekistan | Tashkent | Embassy | | |
| Vietnam | Hanoi | Embassy | Countries: Cambodia | |

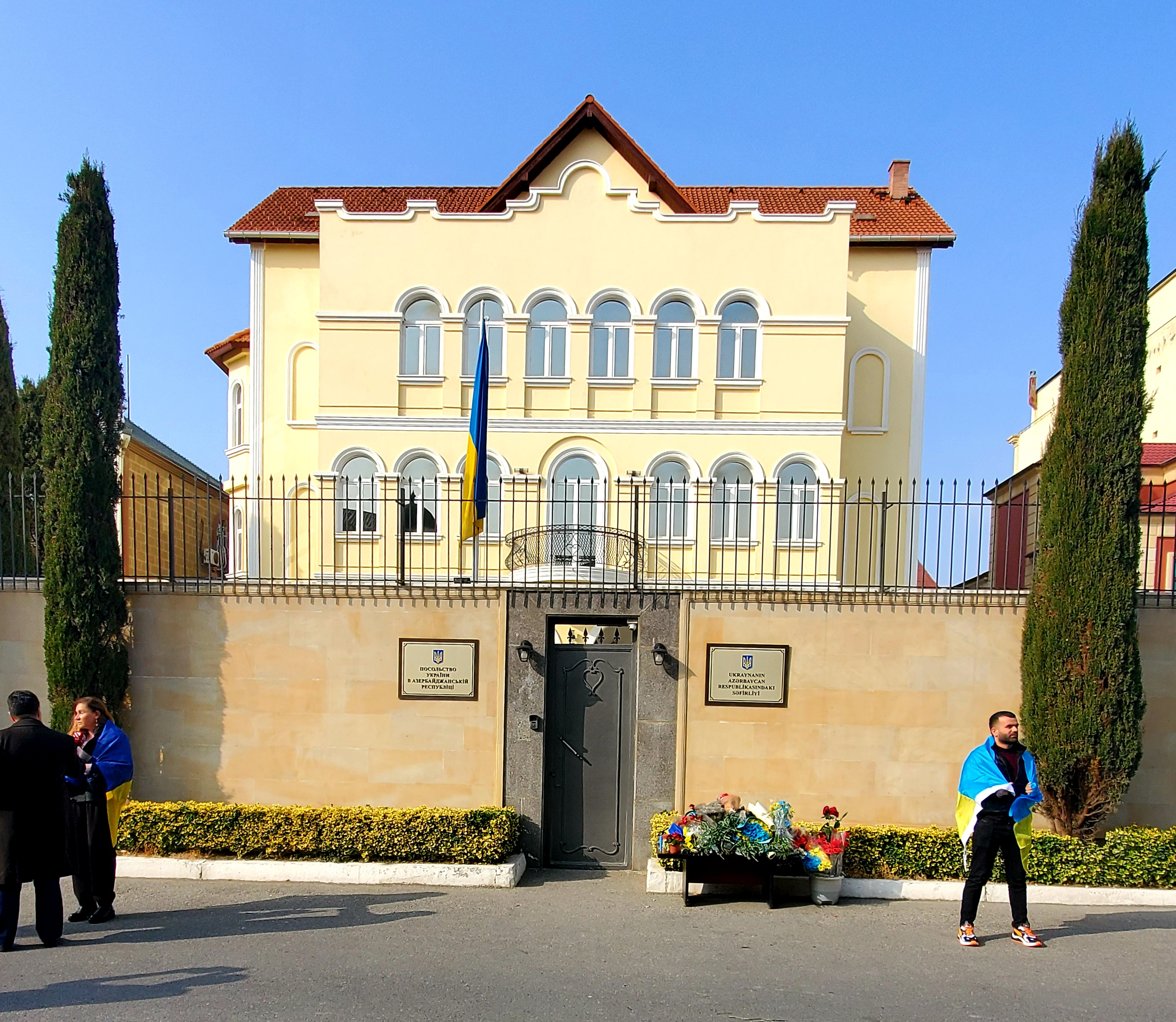
Embassy in Baku

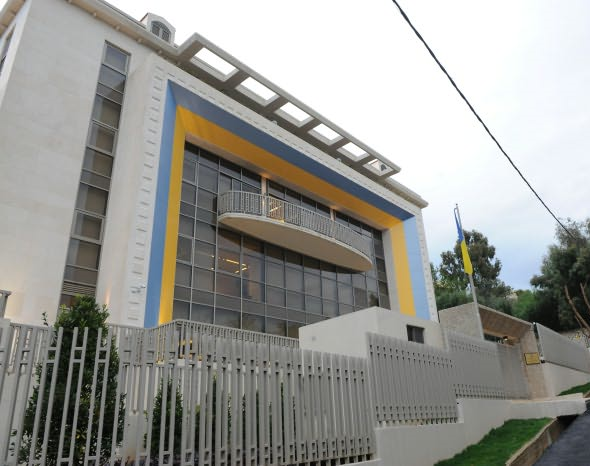
Embassy in Beirut

Building hosting the Embassy in Manila

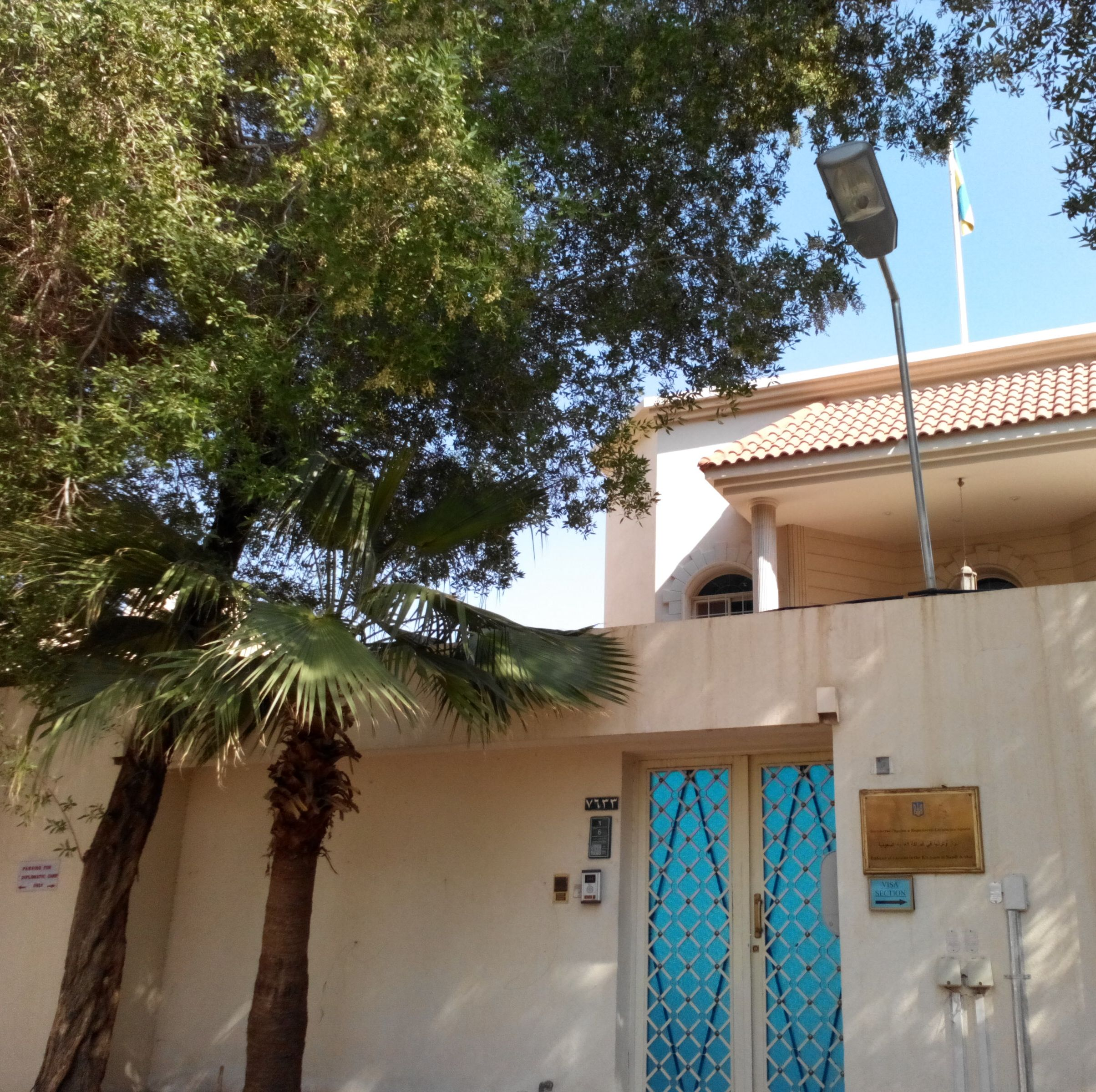
Embassy in Riyadh

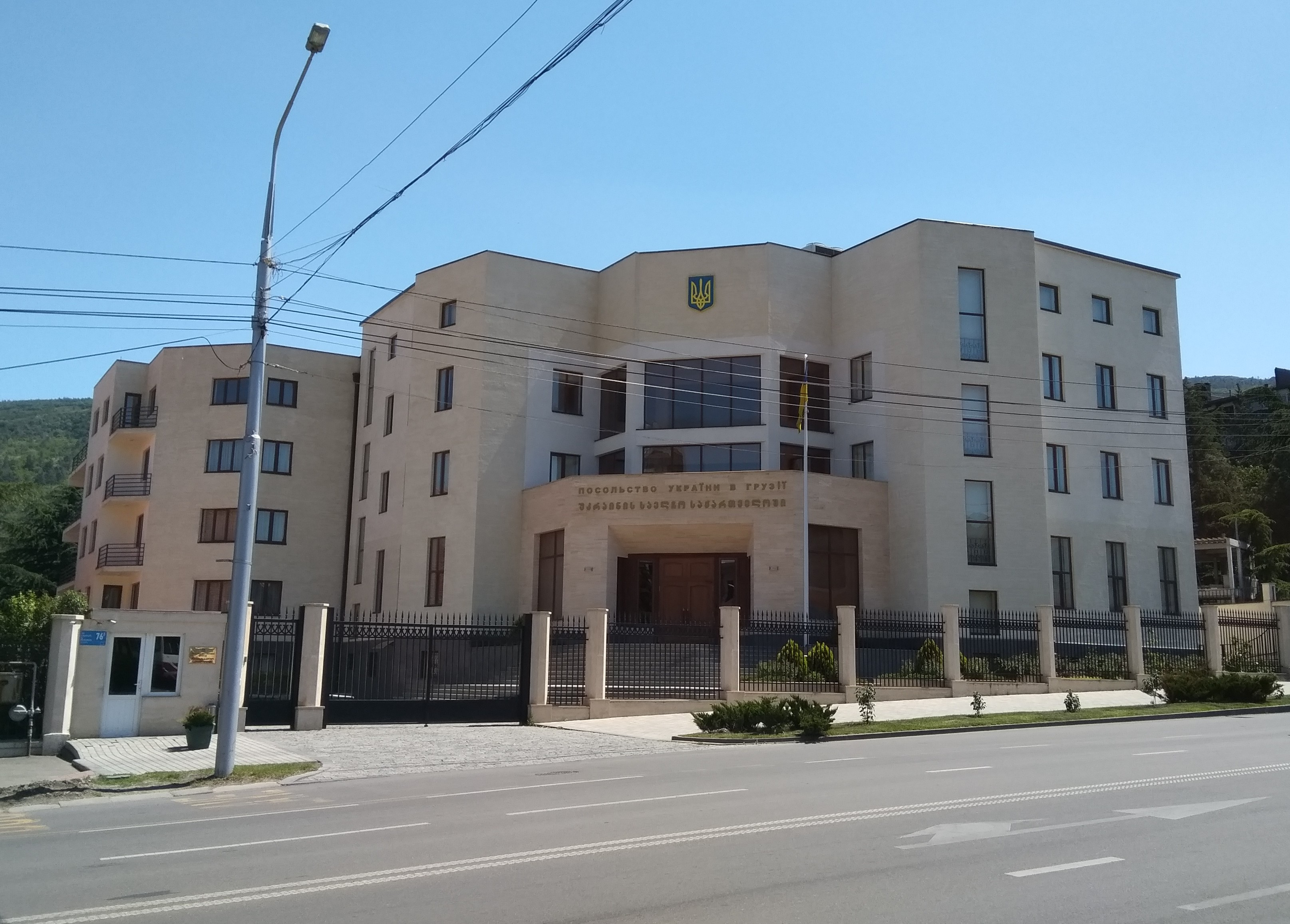
Embassy in Tbilisi

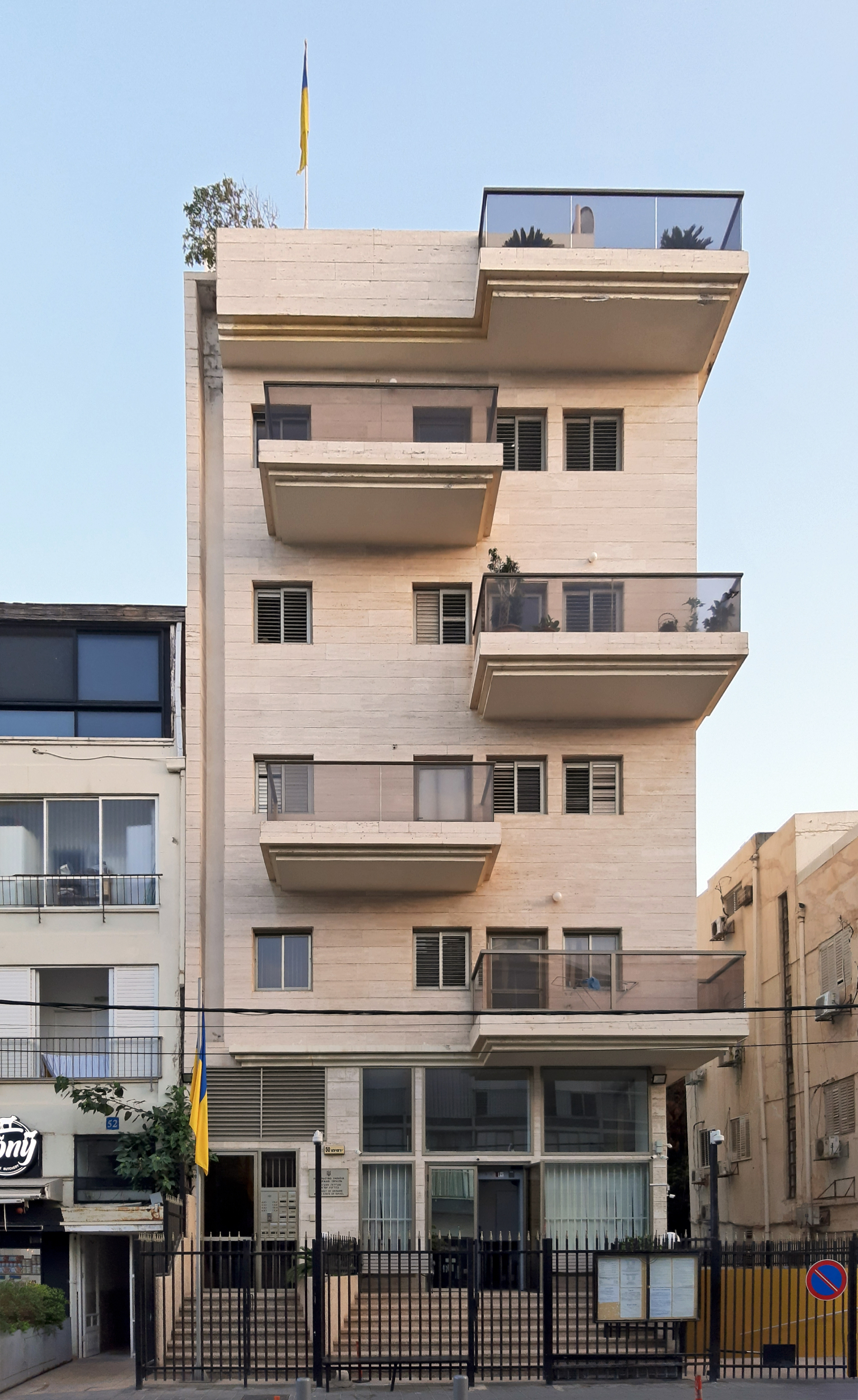
Embassy in Tel Aviv

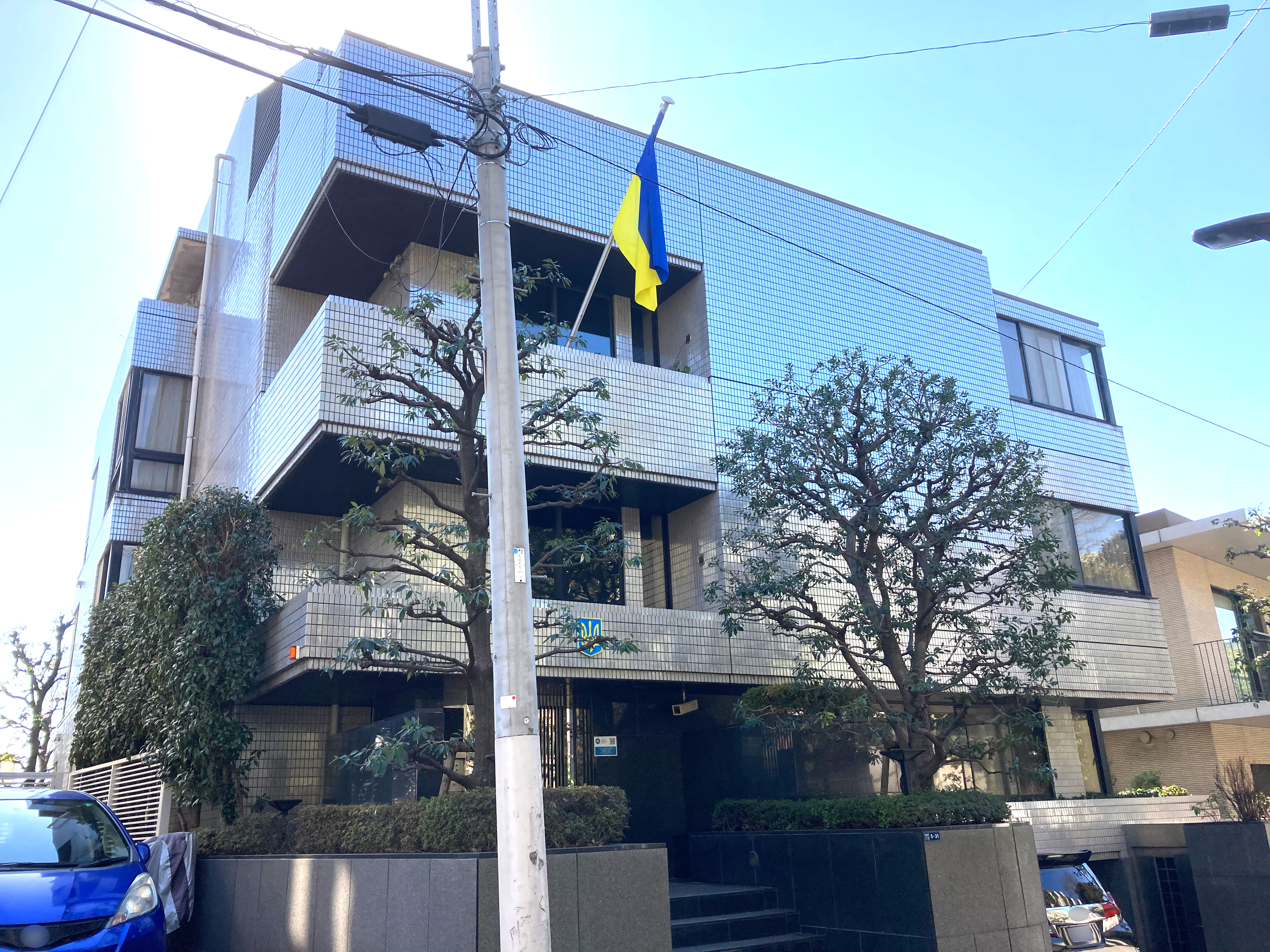
Embassy in Tokyo

=== Europe ===
| Host country | Host city | Mission | Concurrent accreditation | Ref. |
|---|---|---|---|---|
| Albania | Tirana | Embassy | | |
| Austria | Vienna | Embassy | | |
| Belarus | Minsk | Embassy | | |
| Belgium | Brussels | Embassy | Countries: Luxembourg | |
| Bosnia and Herzegovina | Sarajevo | Embassy | | |
| Bulgaria | Sofia | Embassy | | |
| Croatia | Zagreb | Embassy | Countries: Bosnia and Herzegovina | |
| Cyprus | Nicosia | Embassy | | |
| Czechia | Prague | Embassy | | |
| Czechia | Brno | Consulate | | |
| Denmark | Copenhagen | Embassy | | |
| Estonia | Tallinn | Embassy | | |
| Finland | Helsinki | Embassy | Countries: Iceland | |
| France | Paris | Embassy | Countries: Haiti; Monaco | |
| France | Lyon | Consulate-General | Countries: Haiti; Monaco | |
| Germany | Berlin | Embassy | | |
| Germany | Düsseldorf | Consulate-General | | |
| Germany | Frankfurt | Consulate-General | | |
| Germany | Hamburg | Consulate-General | | |
| Germany | Munich | Consulate-General | | |
| Greece | Athens | Embassy | | |
| Greece | Thessaloniki | Consulate | | |
| Holy See (Note: The Ukrainian Embassy to the Holy See is located outside Vatican territory in Rome.) | Rome | Embassy | Sovereign entity: Sovereign Military Order of Malta | |
| Hungary | Budapest | Embassy | | |
| Hungary | Nyíregyháza | Consulate | | |
| Ireland | Dublin | Embassy | | |
| Italy | Rome | Embassy | Countries: Malta; San Marino; Multilateral Organizations: Food and Agriculture Organization; International Fund for Agricultural Development; World Food Programme | |
| Italy | Milan | Consulate-General | Countries: Malta; San Marino; Multilateral Organizations: Food and Agriculture Organization; International Fund for Agricultural Development; World Food Programme | |
| Italy | Naples | Consulate-General | Countries: Malta; San Marino; Multilateral Organizations: Food and Agriculture Organization; International Fund for Agricultural Development; World Food Programme | |
| Latvia | Riga | Embassy | | |
| Lithuania | Vilnius | Embassy | | |
| Montenegro | Podgorica | Embassy | | |
| Netherlands | The Hague | Embassy | Multilateral Organizations: Organisation for the Prohibition of Chemical Weapons | |
| North Macedonia | Skopje | Embassy | | |
| Moldova | Chişinău | Embassy | | |
| Moldova | Bălţi | Consulate | | |
| Norway | Oslo | Embassy | | |
| Poland | Warsaw | Embassy | | |
| Poland | Gdańsk | Consulate-General | | |
| Poland | Kraków | Consulate-General | | |
| Poland | Lublin | Consulate-General | | |
| Poland | Wrocław | Consulate-General | | |
| Portugal | Lisbon | Embassy | Countries: Cape Verde; São Tomé and Príncipe | |
| Portugal | Porto | Consulate | Countries: Cape Verde; São Tomé and Príncipe | |
| Romania | Bucharest | Embassy | | |
| Serbia | Belgrade | Embassy | | |
| Slovakia | Bratislava | Embassy | | |
| Slovakia | Prešov | Consulate-General | | |
| Slovenia | Ljubljana | Embassy | | |
| Spain | Madrid | Embassy | Countries: Andorra; Equatorial Guinea | |
| Spain | Barcelona | Consulate-General | Countries: Andorra; Equatorial Guinea | |
| Spain | Málaga | Consulate | Countries: Andorra; Equatorial Guinea | |
| Sweden | Stockholm | Embassy | | |
| Switzerland | Bern | Embassy | Countries: Liechtenstein | |
| United Kingdom | London | Embassy | Countries: Barbados; Dominica; Grenada; Saint Kitts and Nevis; Saint Lucia; Saint Vincent and the Grenadines; Multilateral Organizations: International Maritime Organization | |
| United Kingdom | Edinburgh | Consulate | Countries: Barbados; Dominica; Grenada; Saint Kitts and Nevis; Saint Lucia; Saint Vincent and the Grenadines; Multilateral Organizations: International Maritime Organization | |

Embassy in Athens

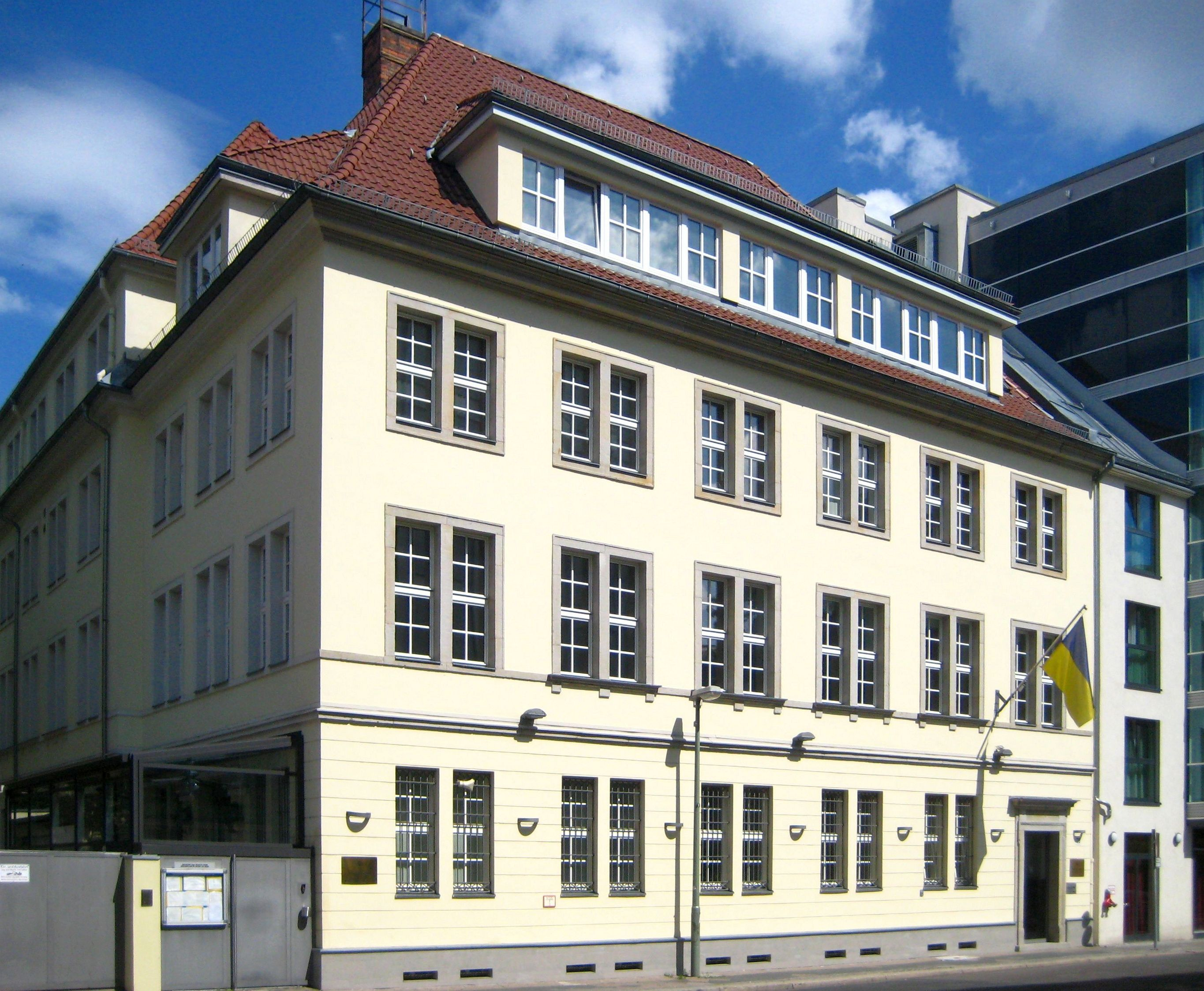
Embassy in Berlin

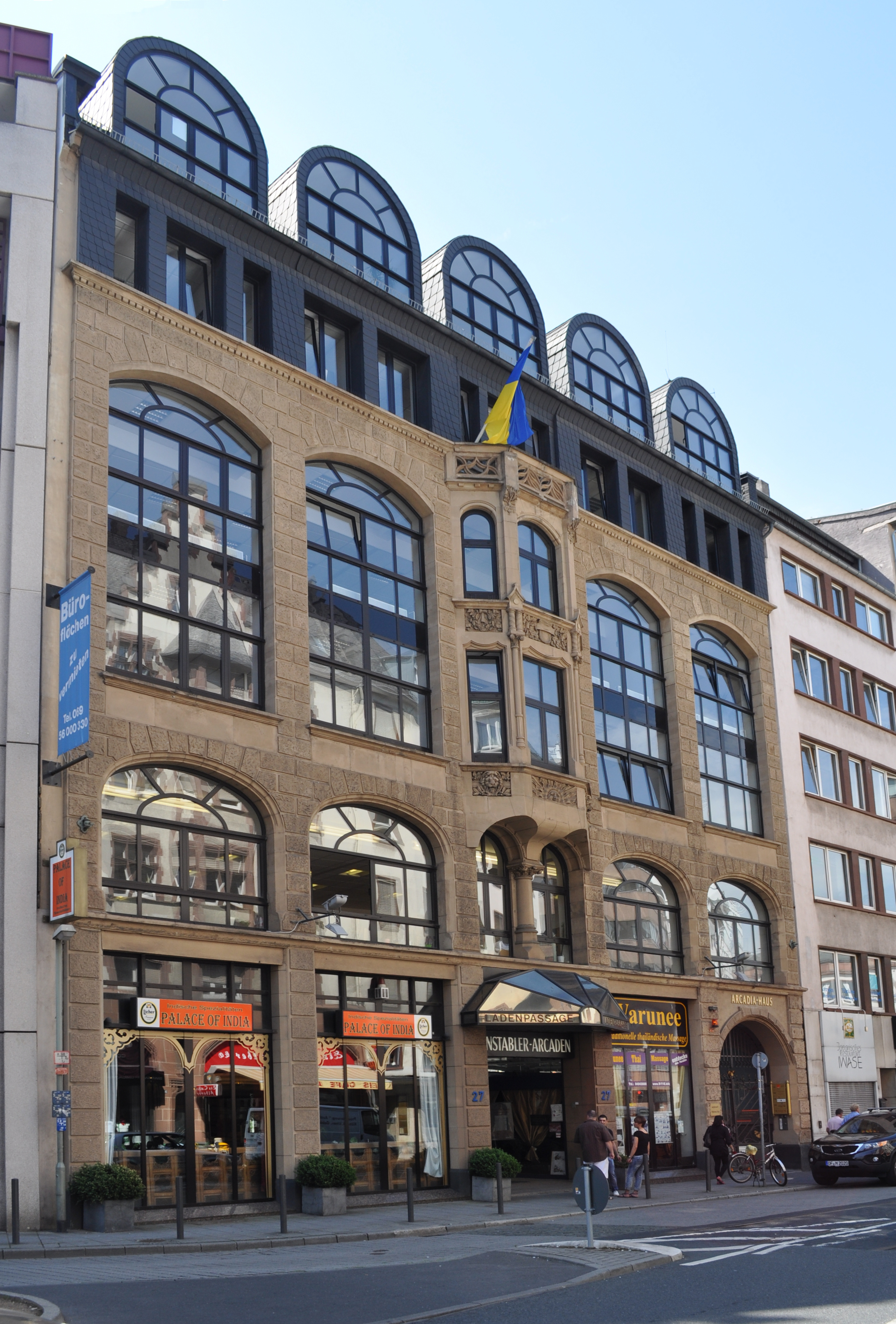
Building hosting the Consulate-General in Frankfurt

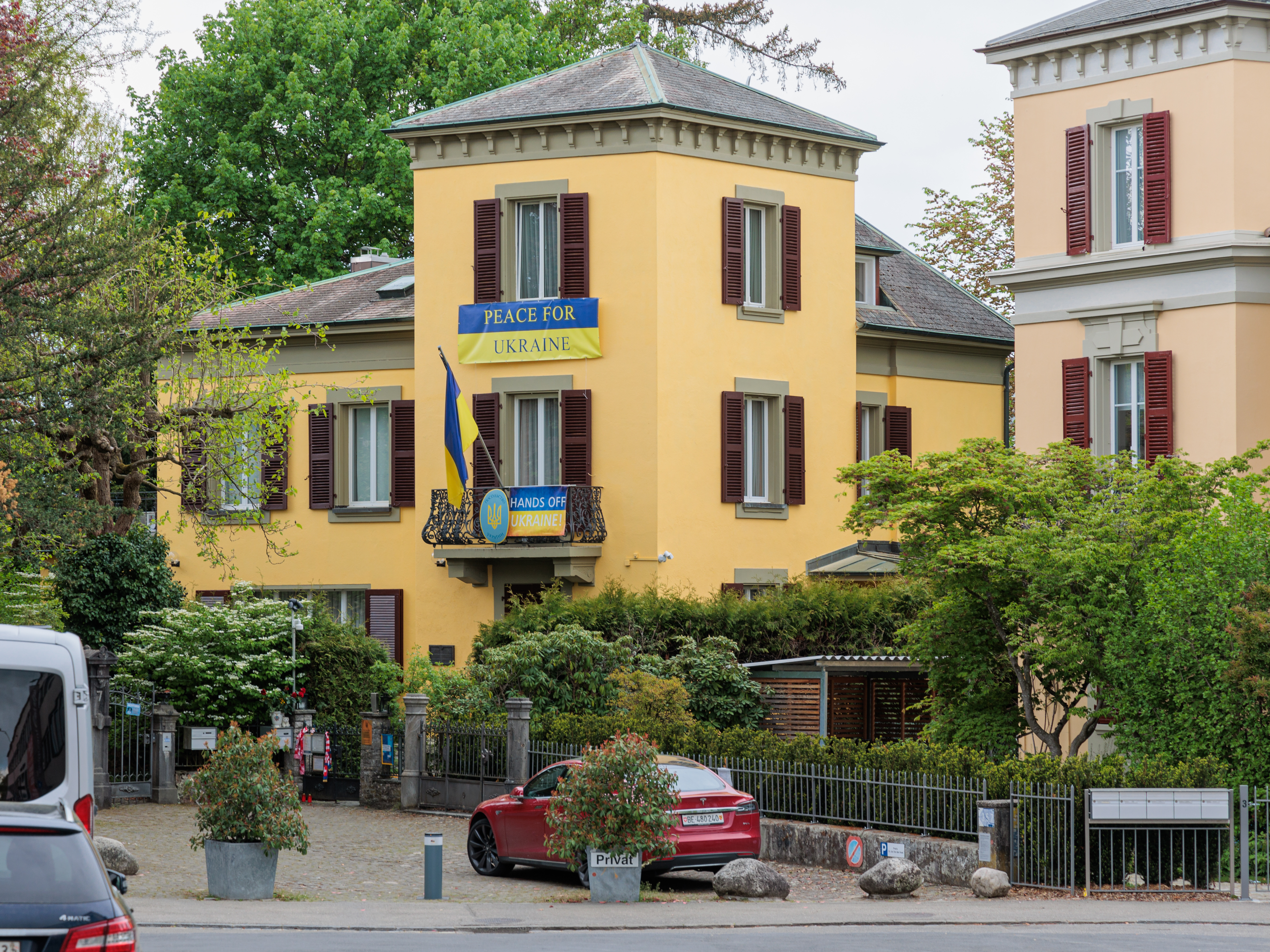
Embassy in Bern

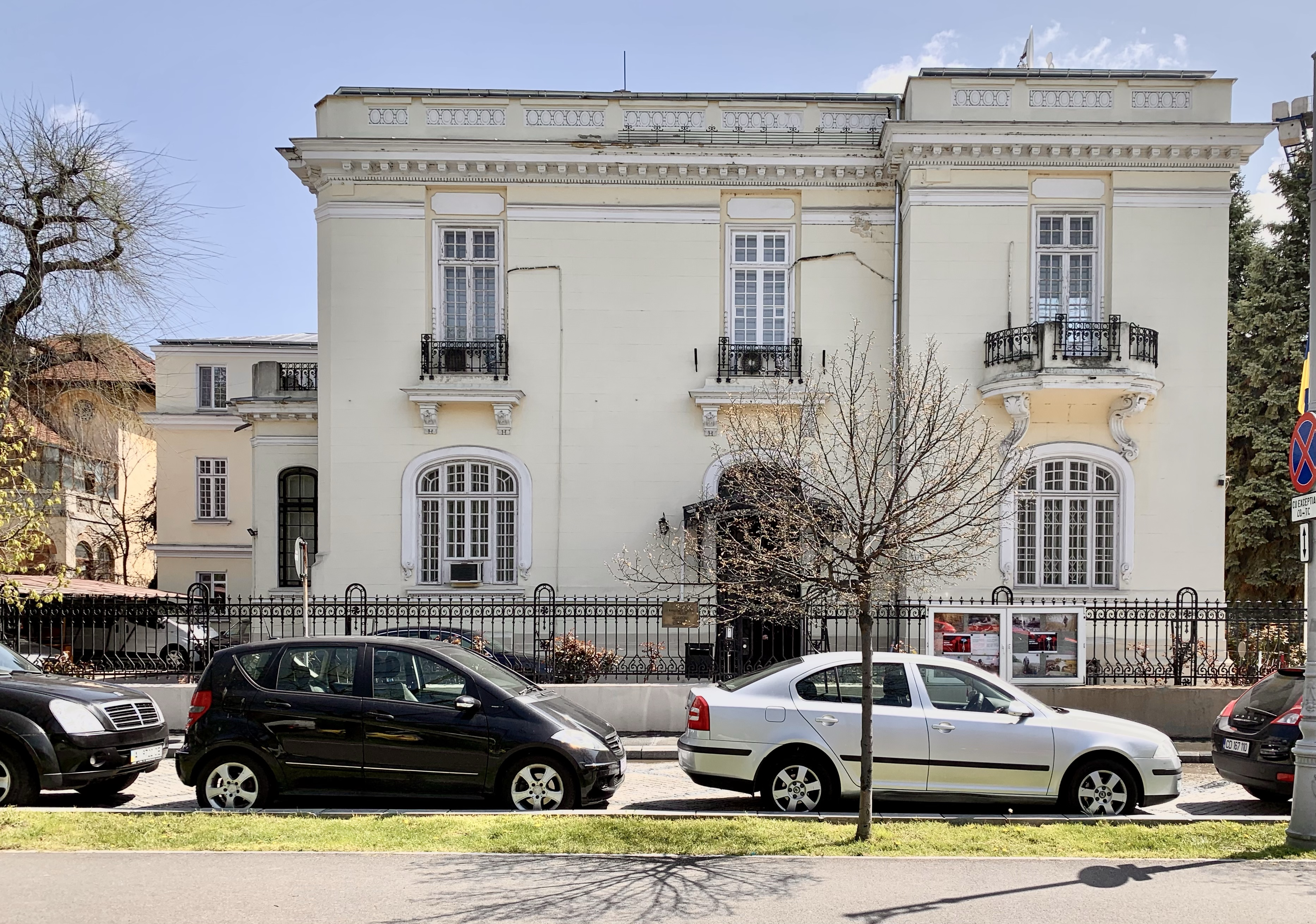
Embassy in Bucharest

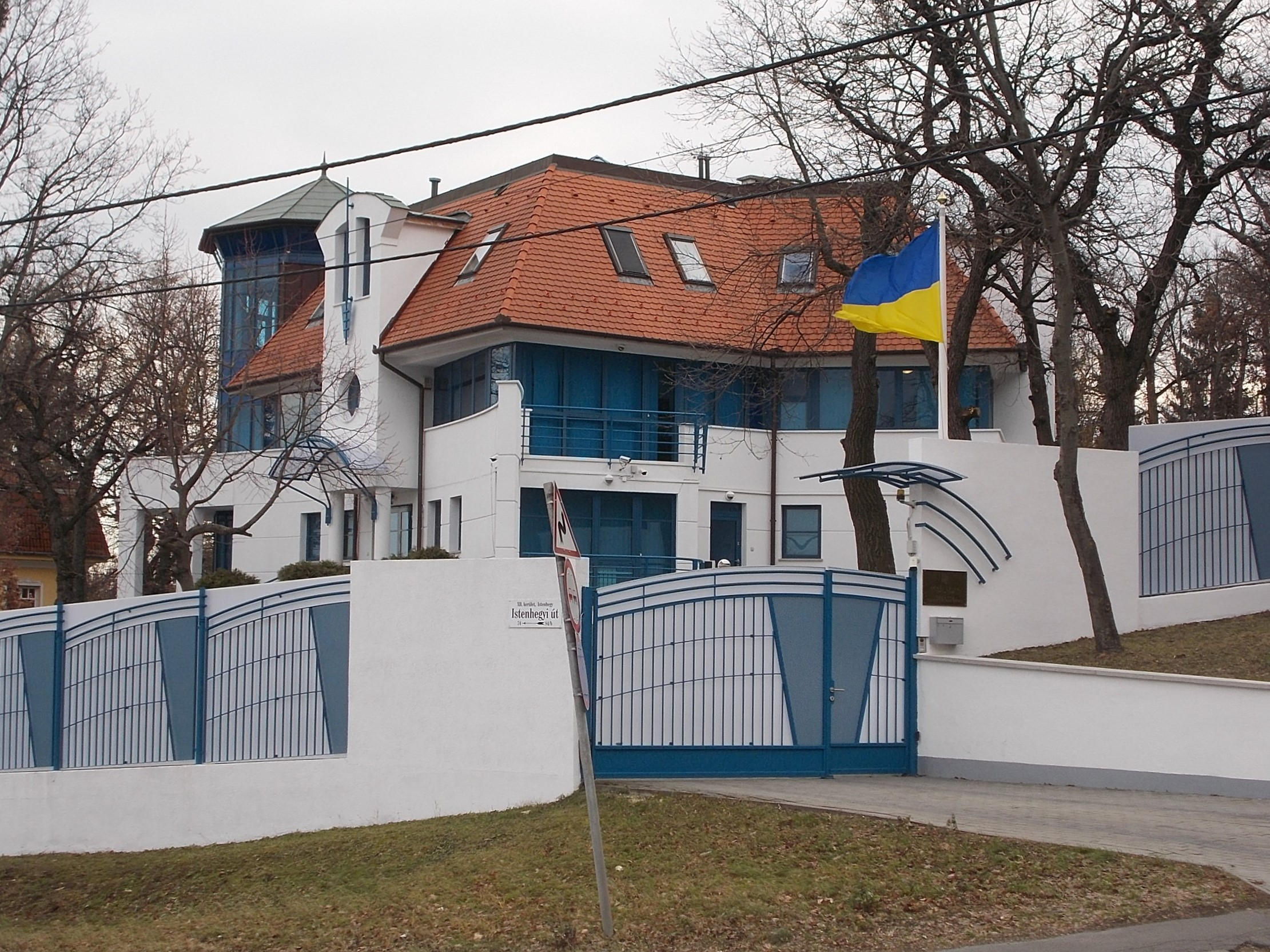
Embassy in Budapest

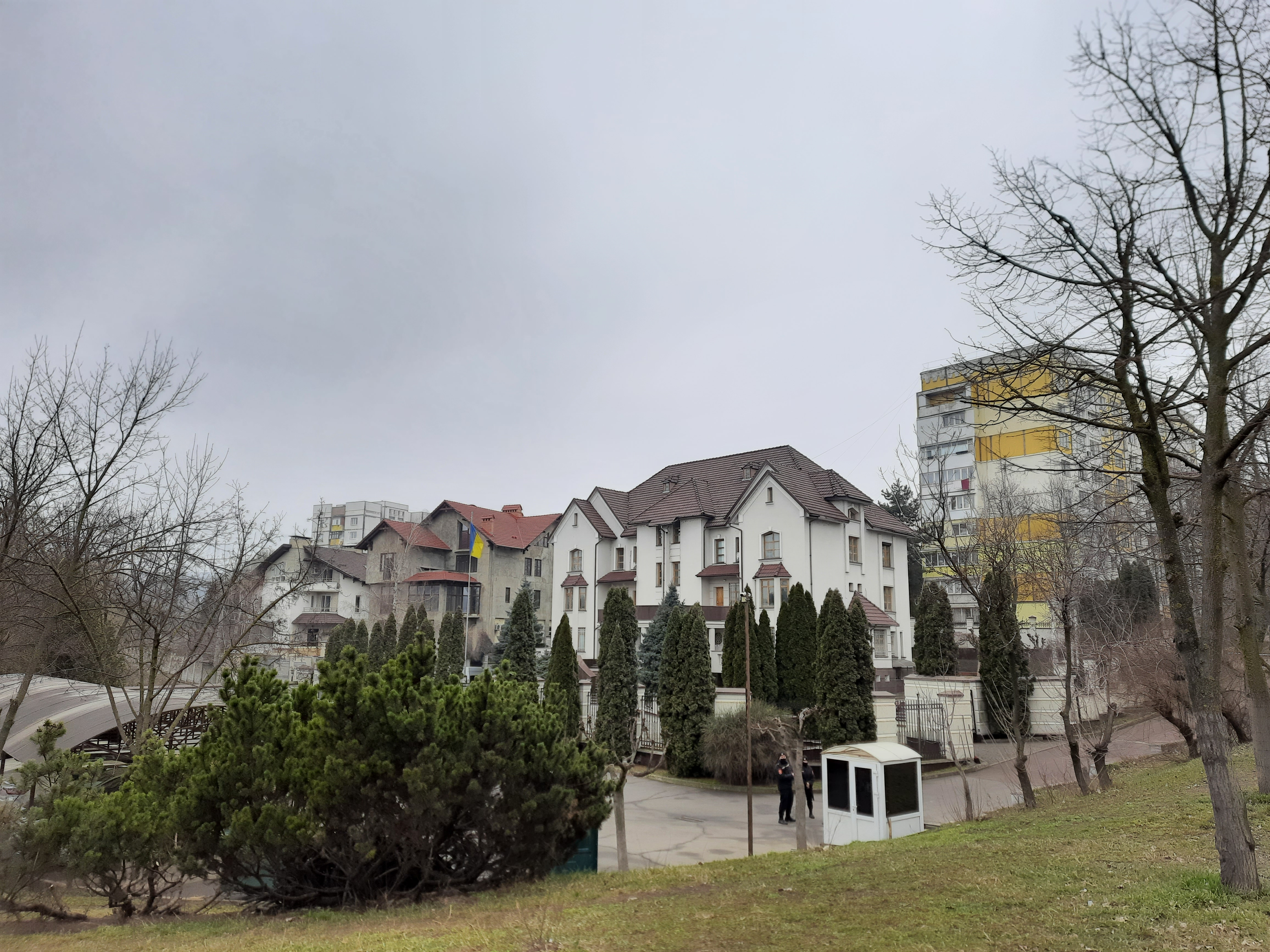
Embassy in Chișinău

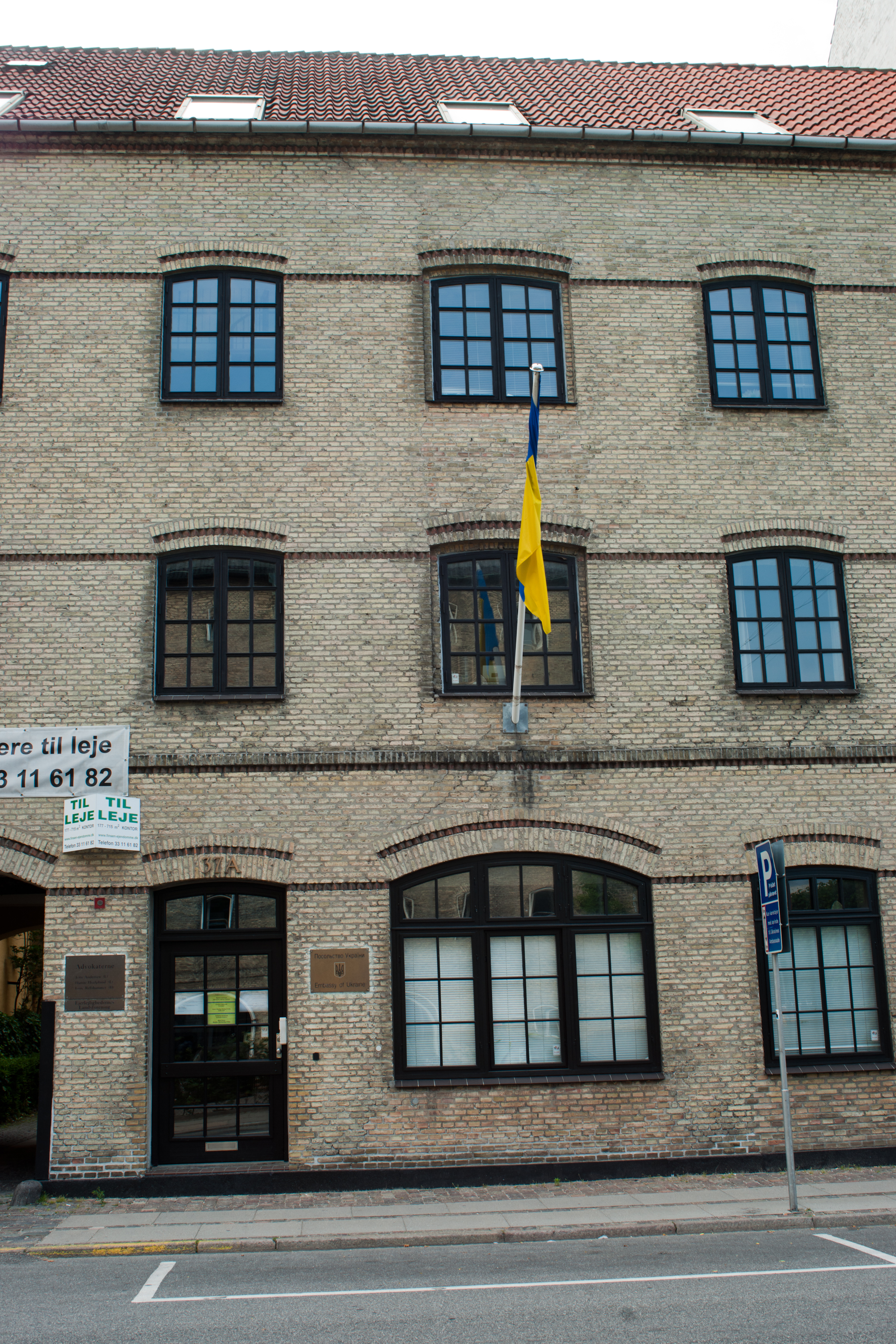
Embassy in Copenhagen

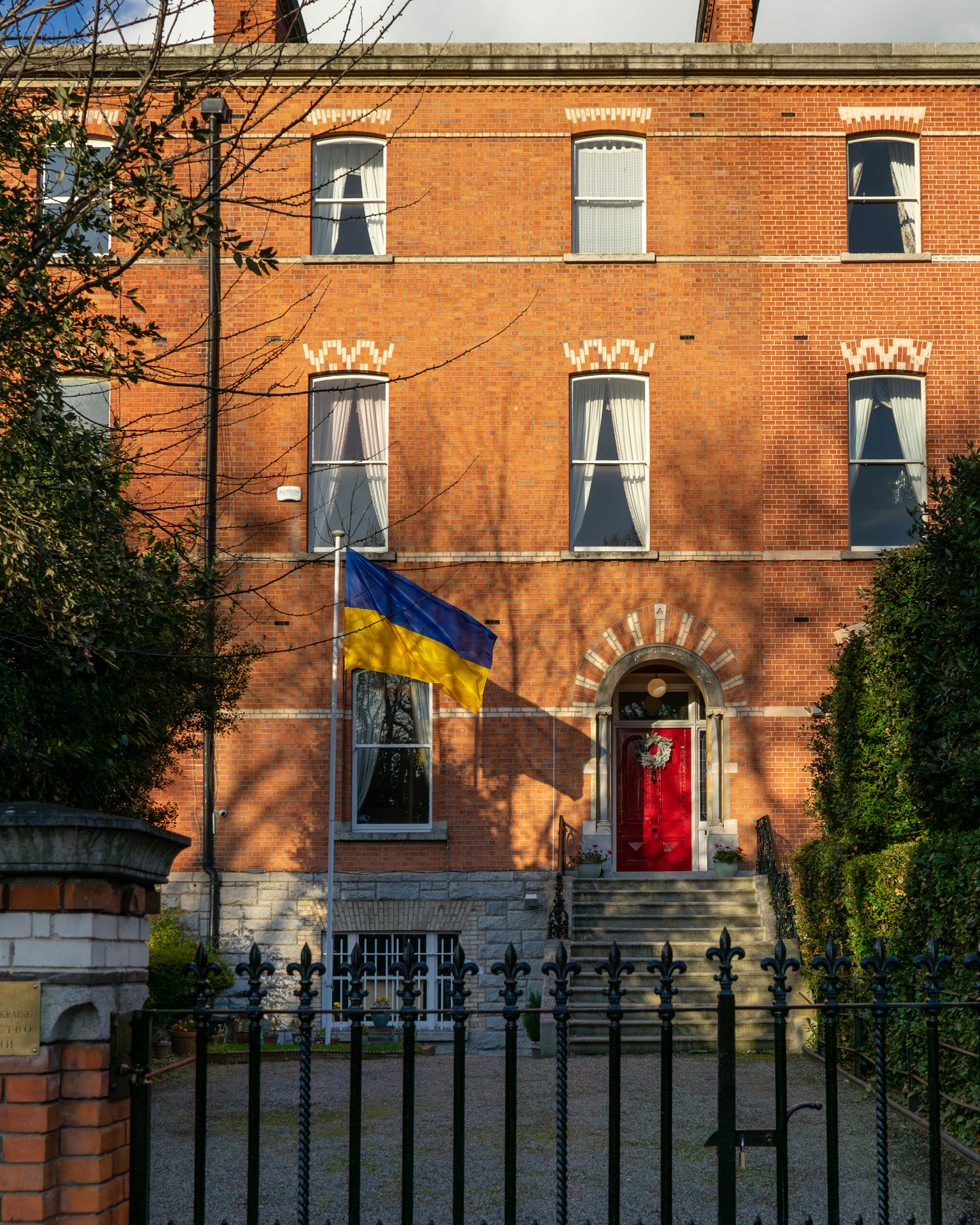
Embassy in Dublin

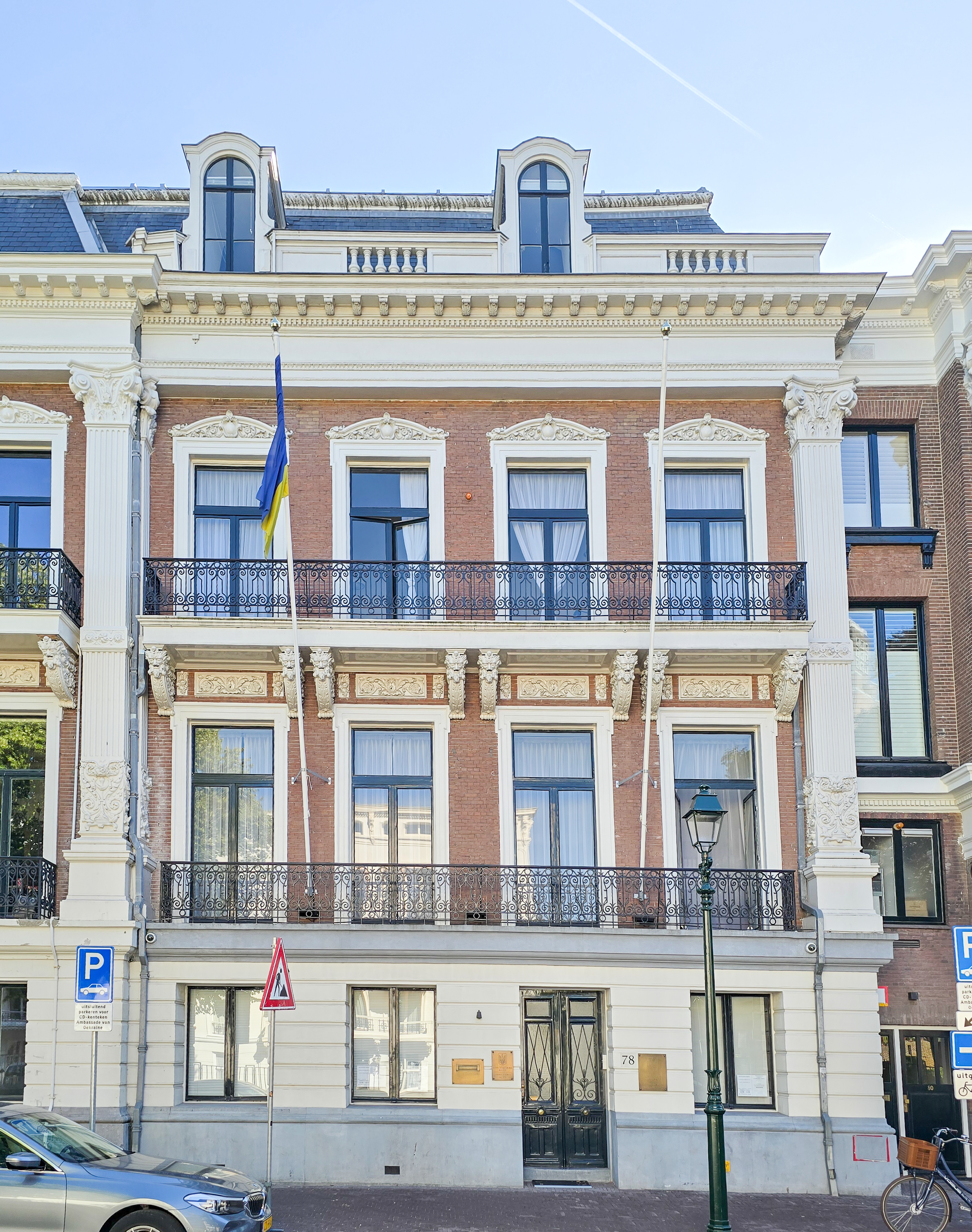
Embassy in The Hague

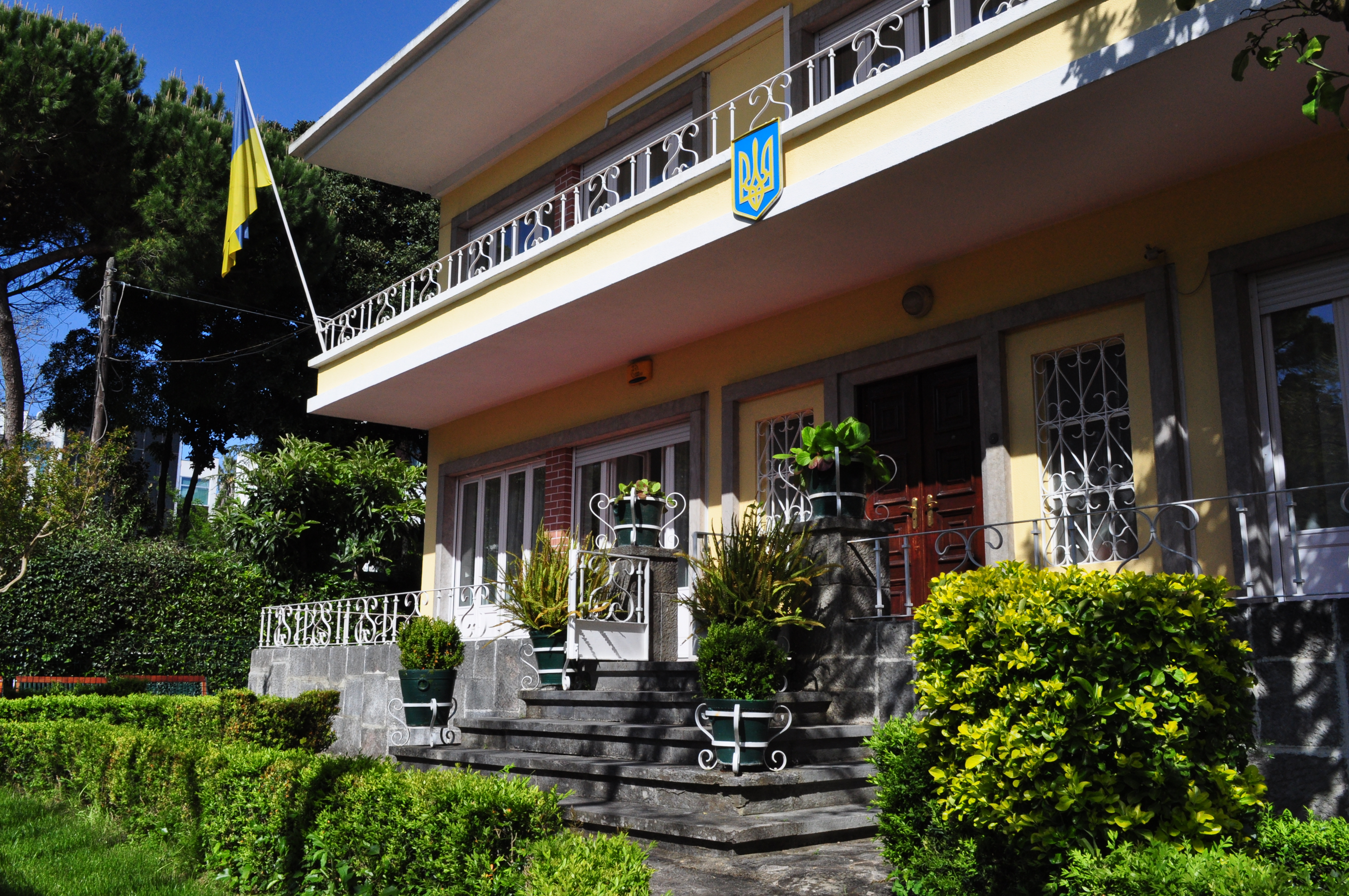
Embassy in Lisbon

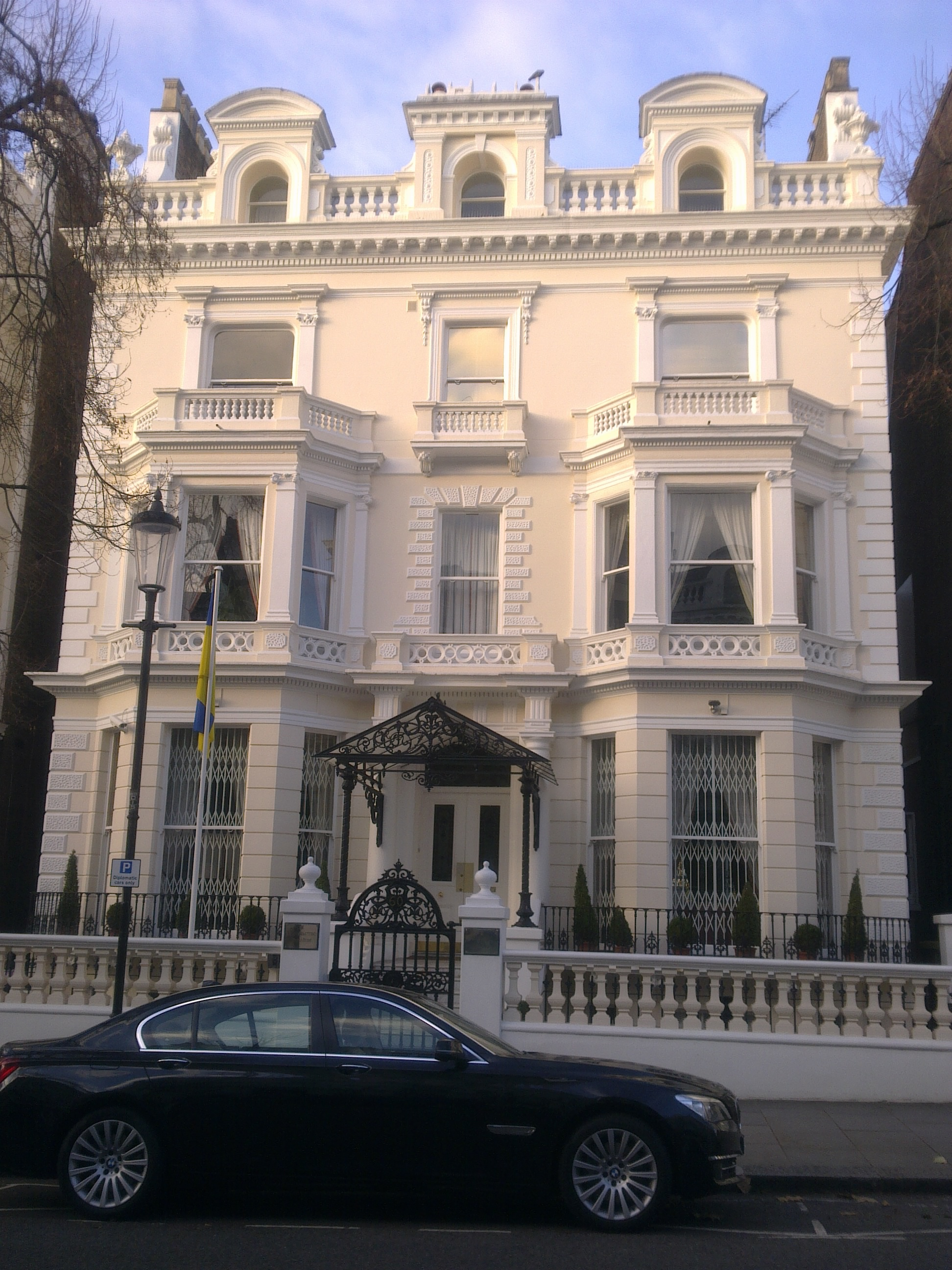
Embassy in London

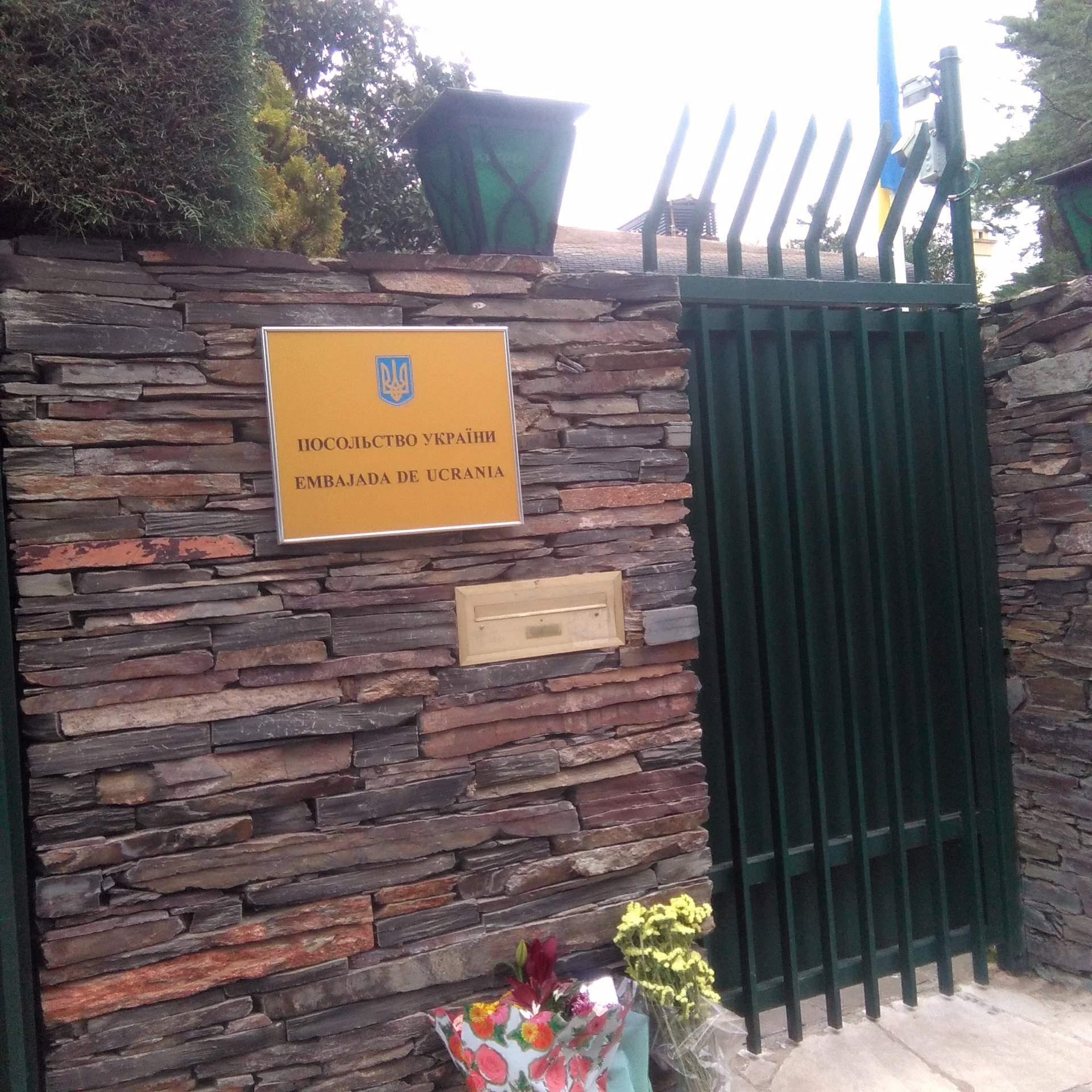
Embassy in Madrid

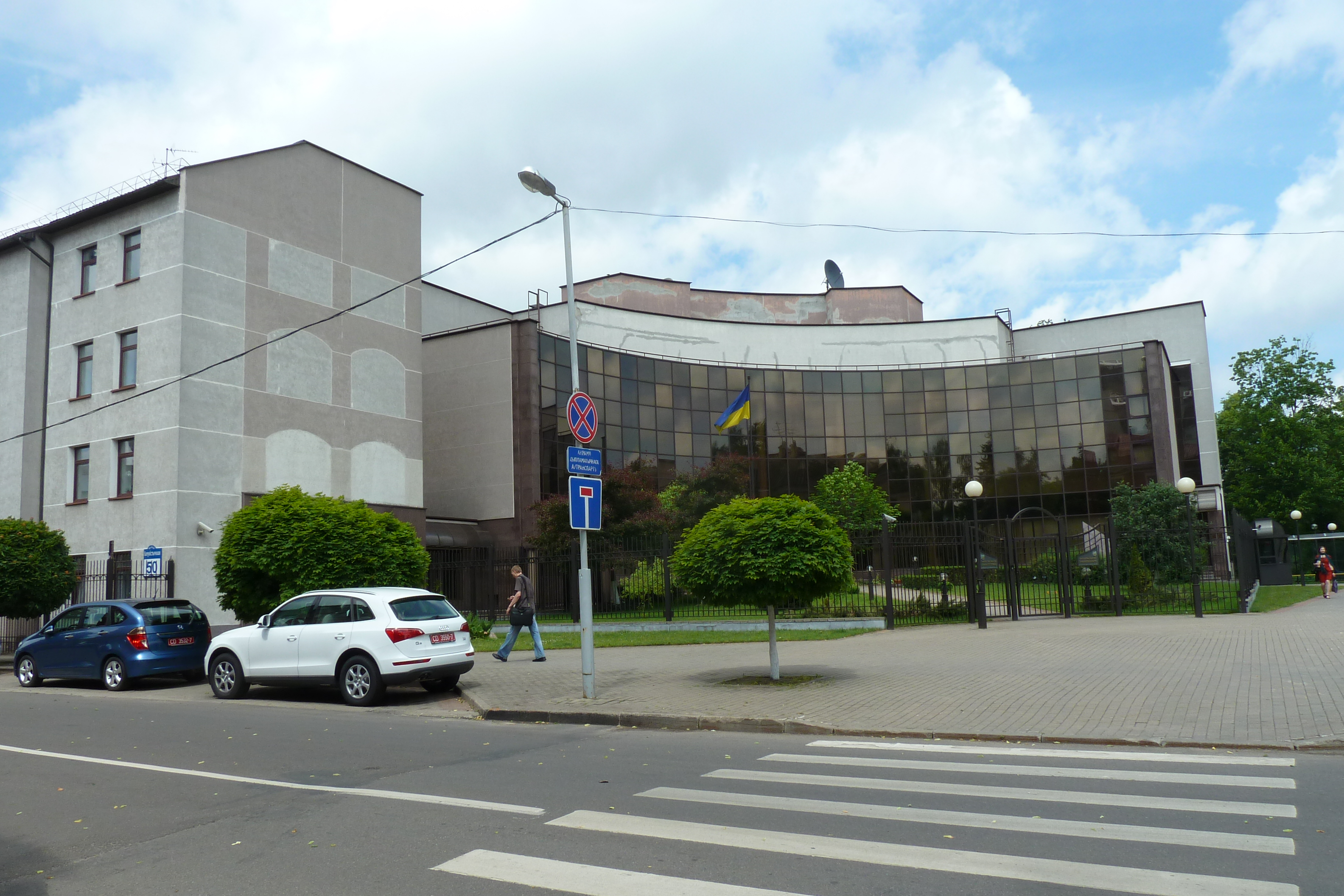
Embassy in Minsk

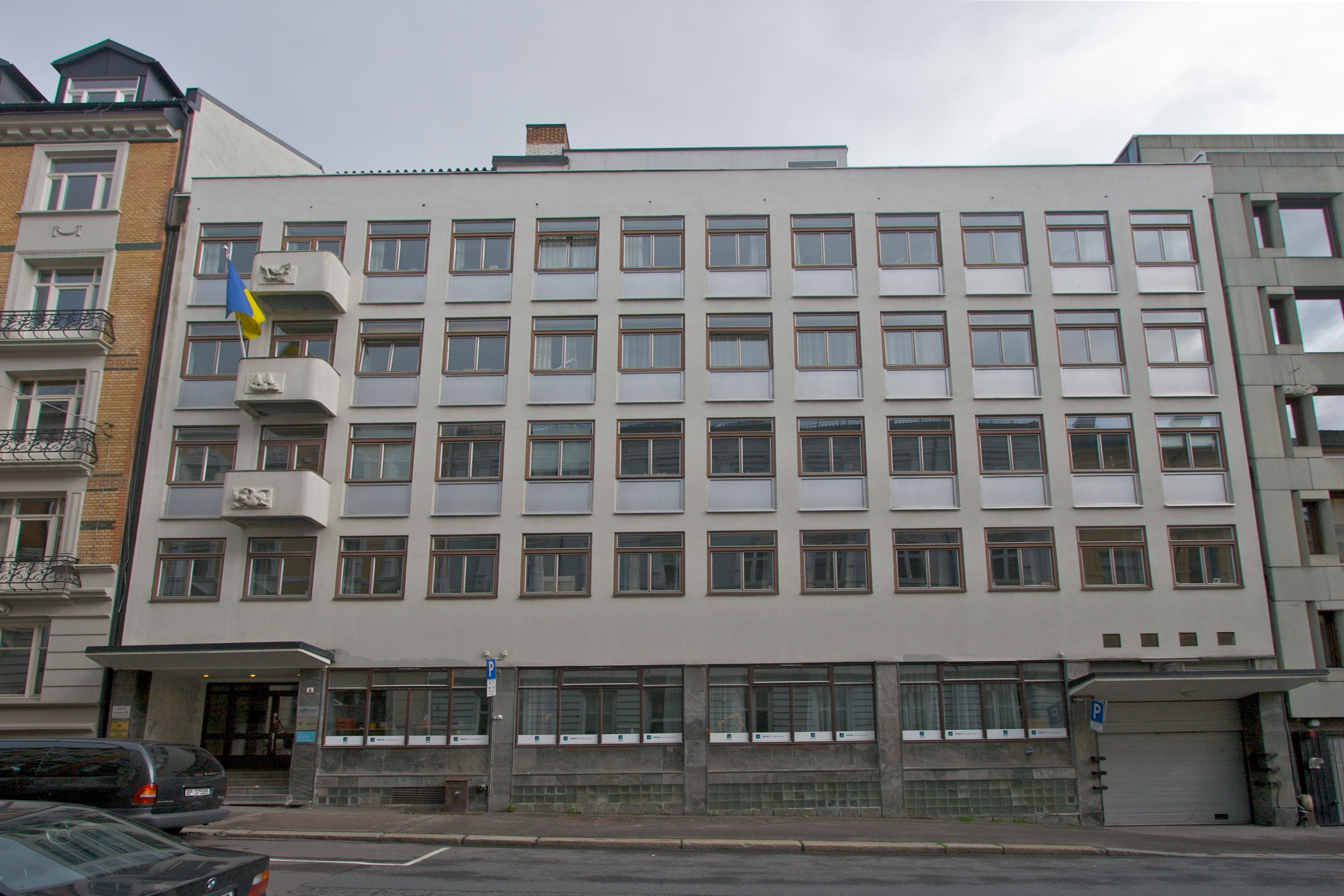
Building hosting the Embassy in Oslo

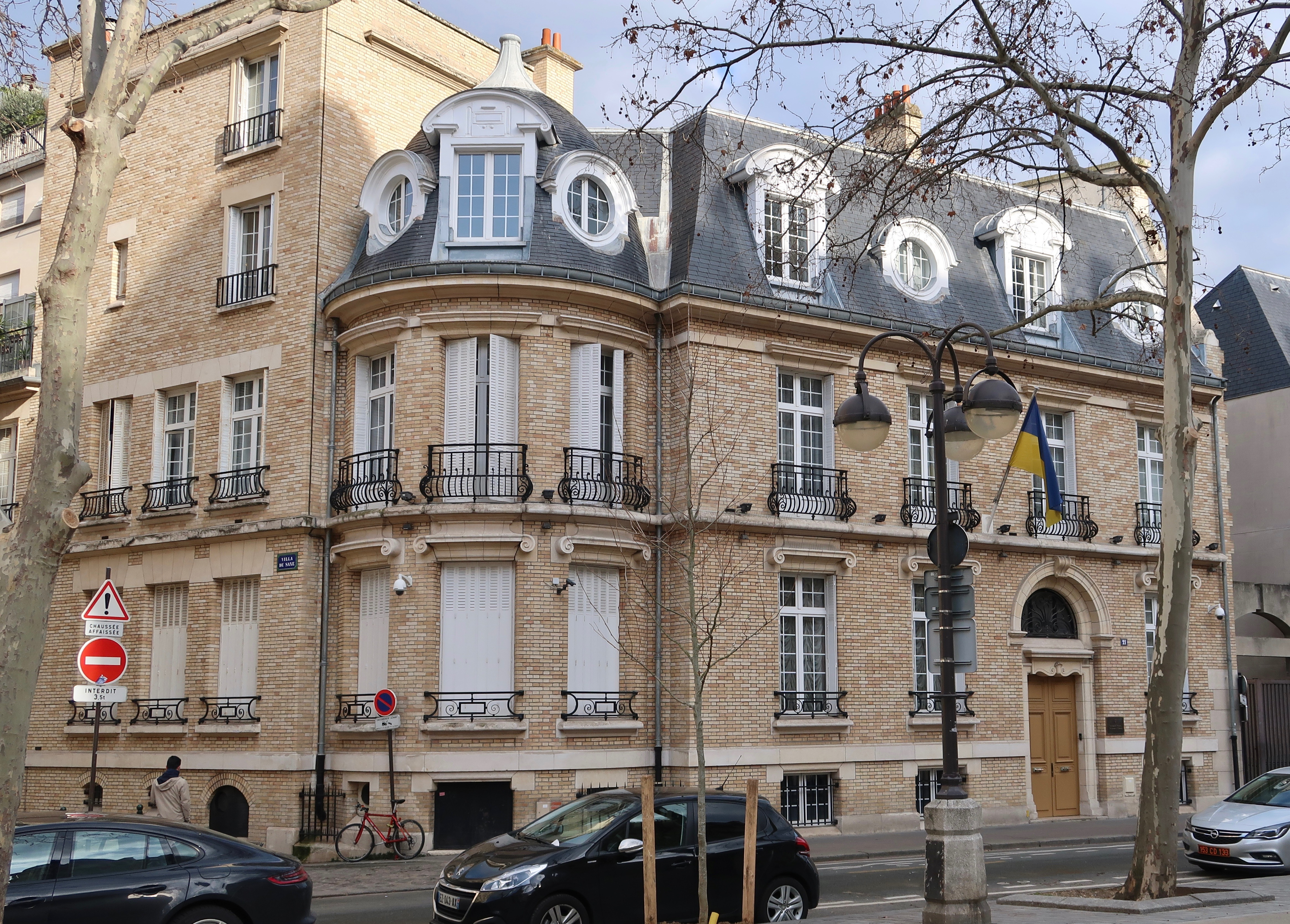
Embassy in Paris

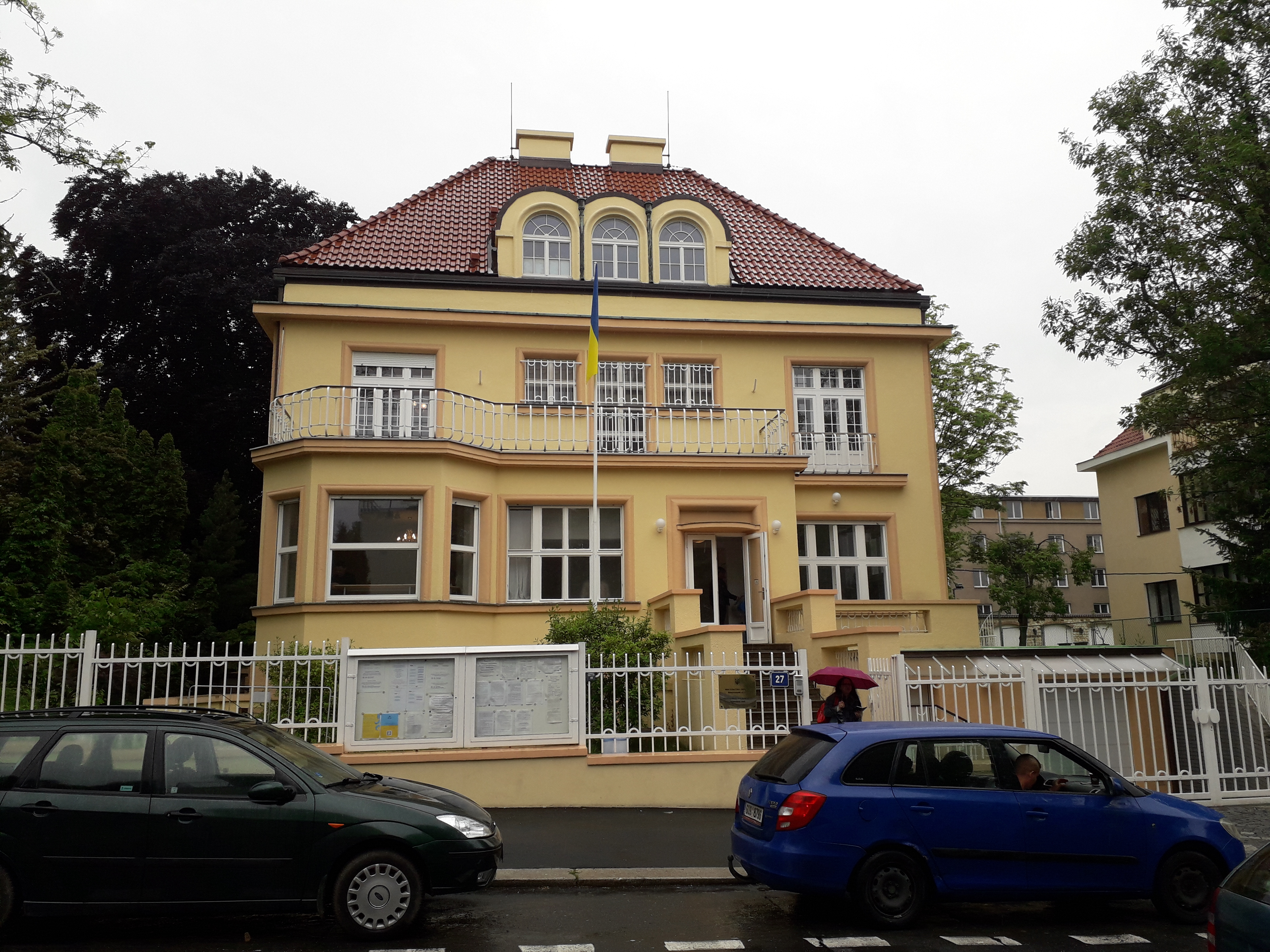
Embassy in Prague

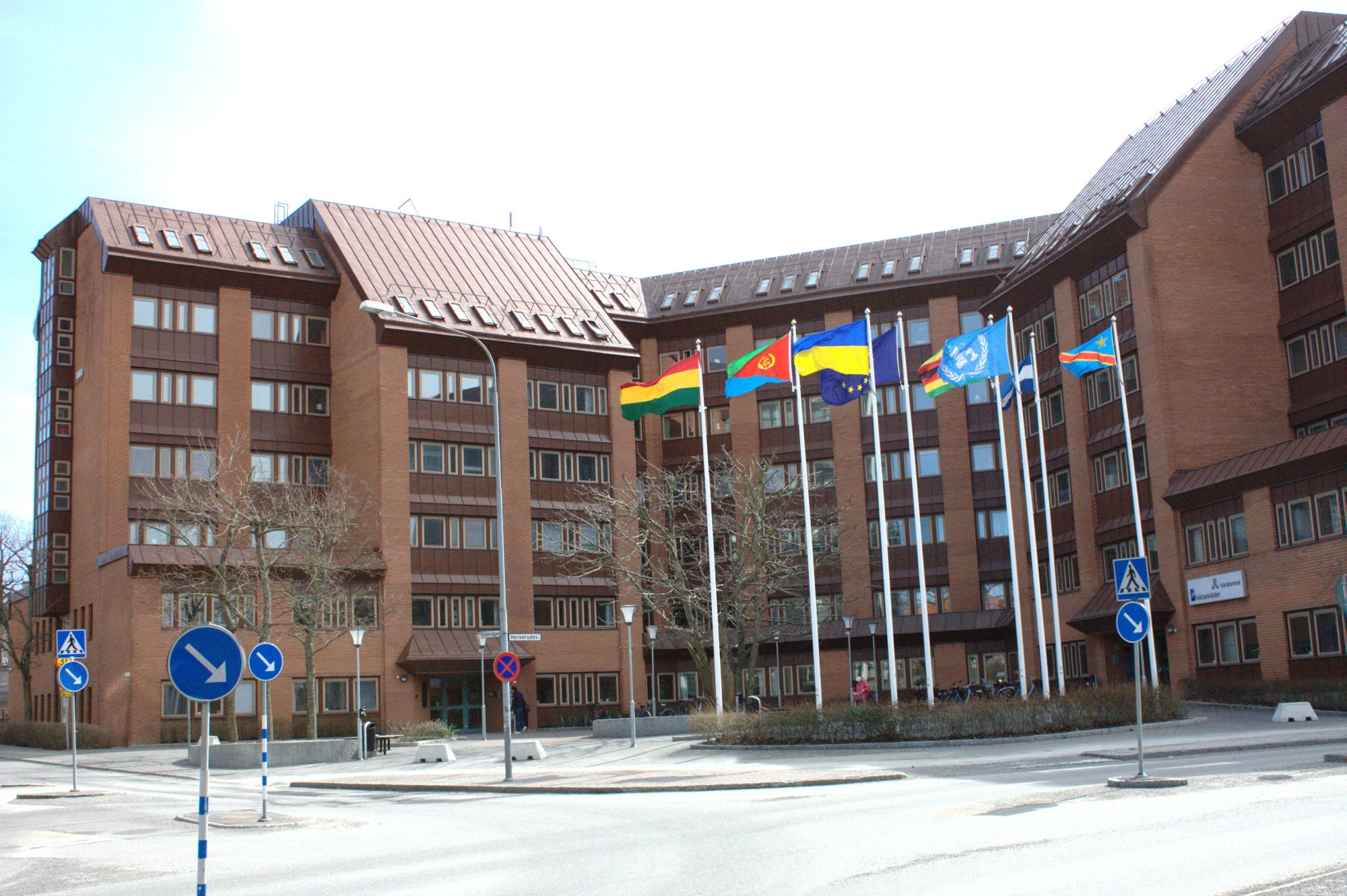
Building hosting the Embassy in Stockholm

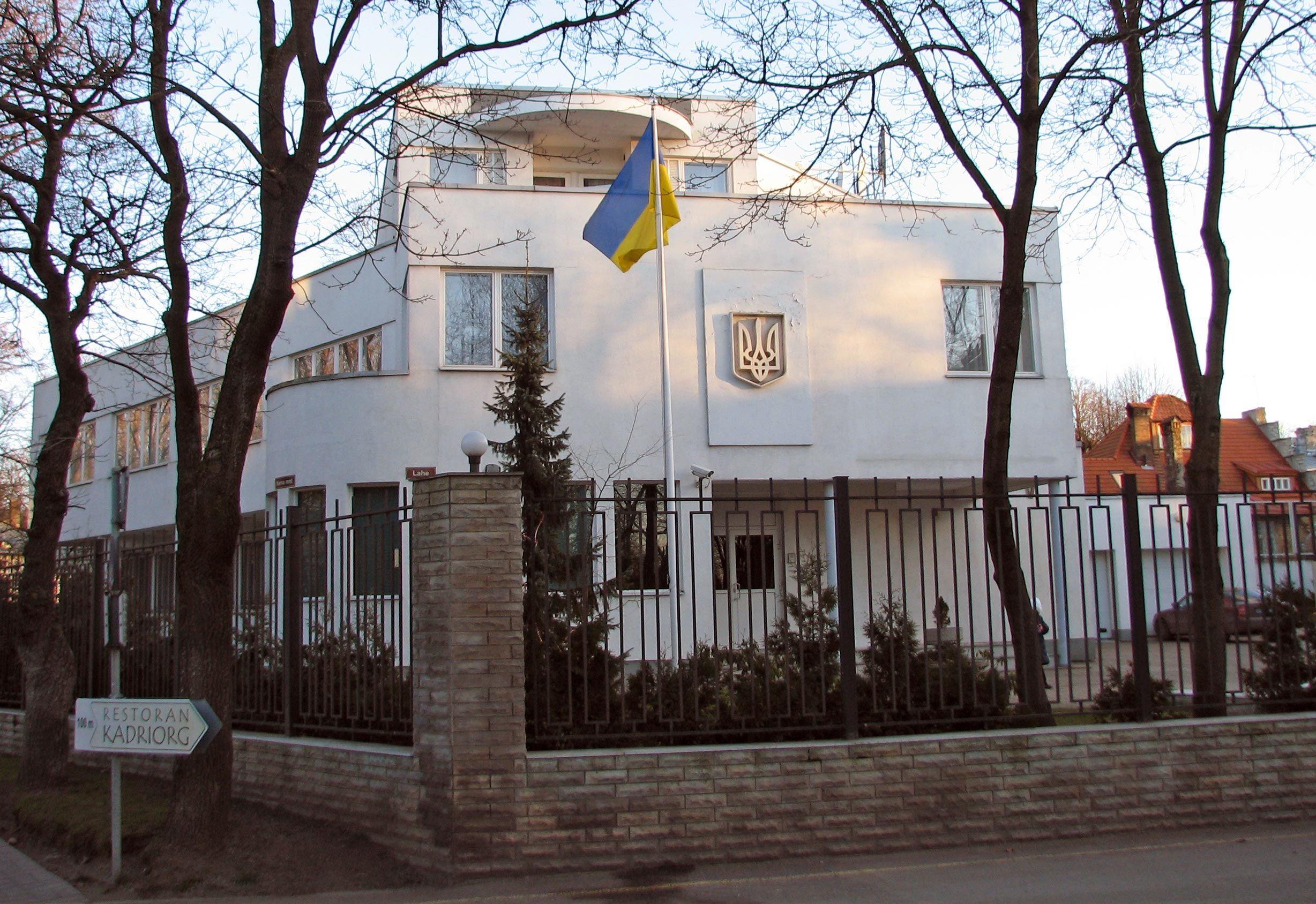
Embassy in Tallinn

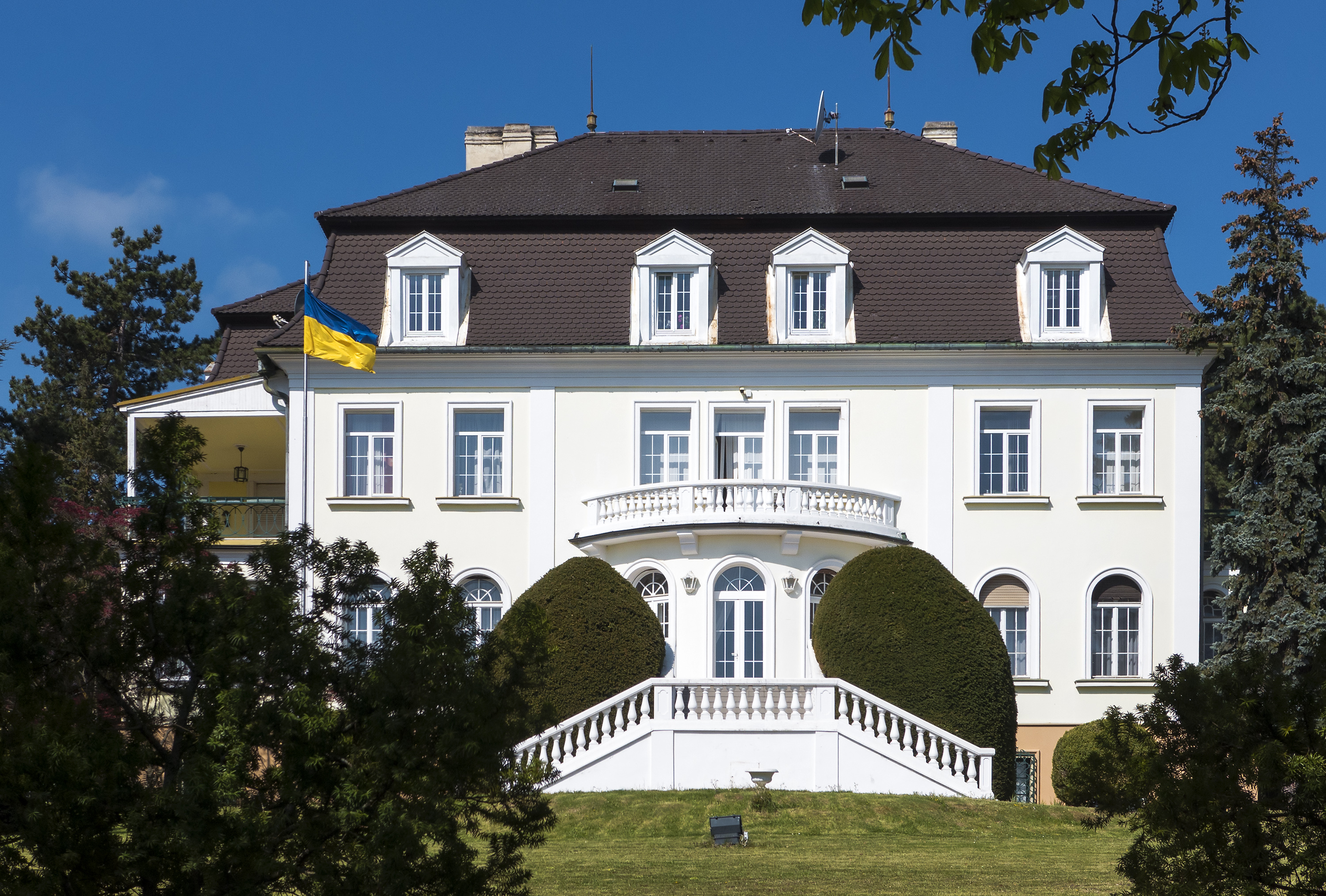
Embassy in Vienna

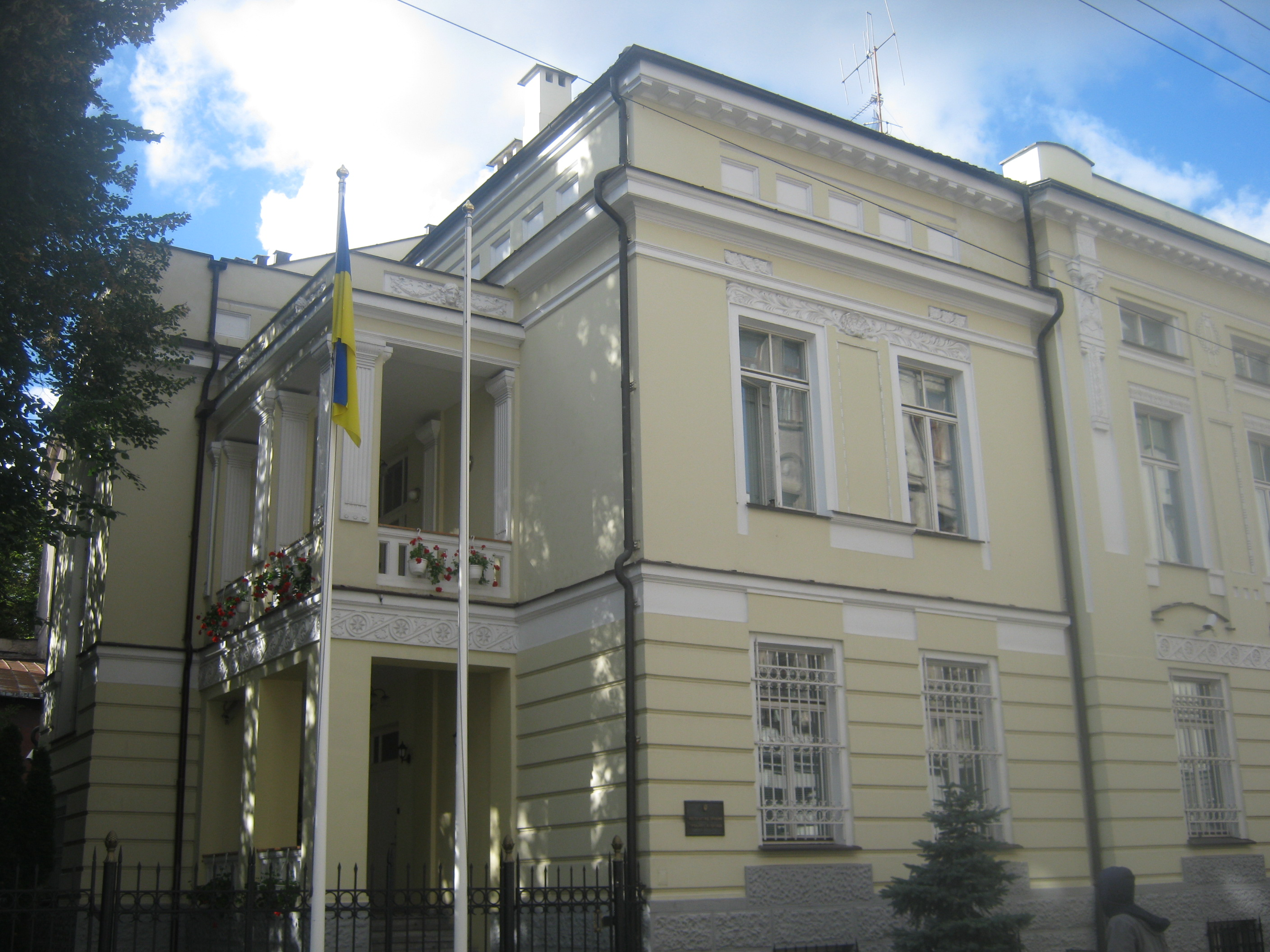
Embassy in Vilnius

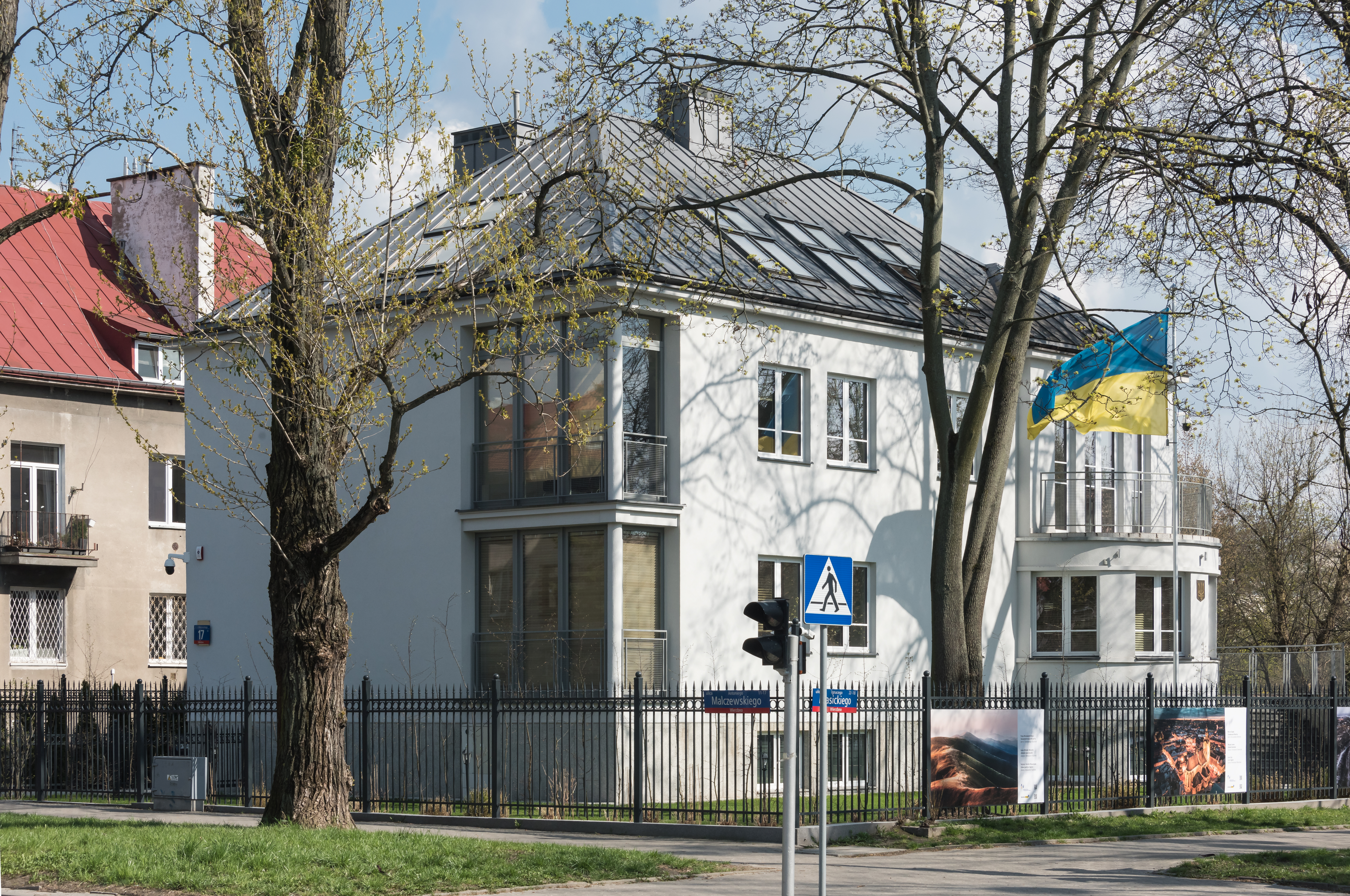
Embassy in Warsaw

=== Oceania ===
| Host country | Host city | Mission | Concurrent accreditation | Ref. |
|---|---|---|---|---|
| Australia | Canberra | Embassy | Countries: Fiji; New Zealand; Samoa; Solomon Islands; Tuvalu; Vanuatu; Consular jurisdiction only: (Note: The following countries are listed only under the consular jurisdiction of the Ukrainian Embassy in Canberra. As of 2023, Ukraine has yet to establish formal diplomatic relations with any of them.); Kiribati; Nauru; Tonga | |

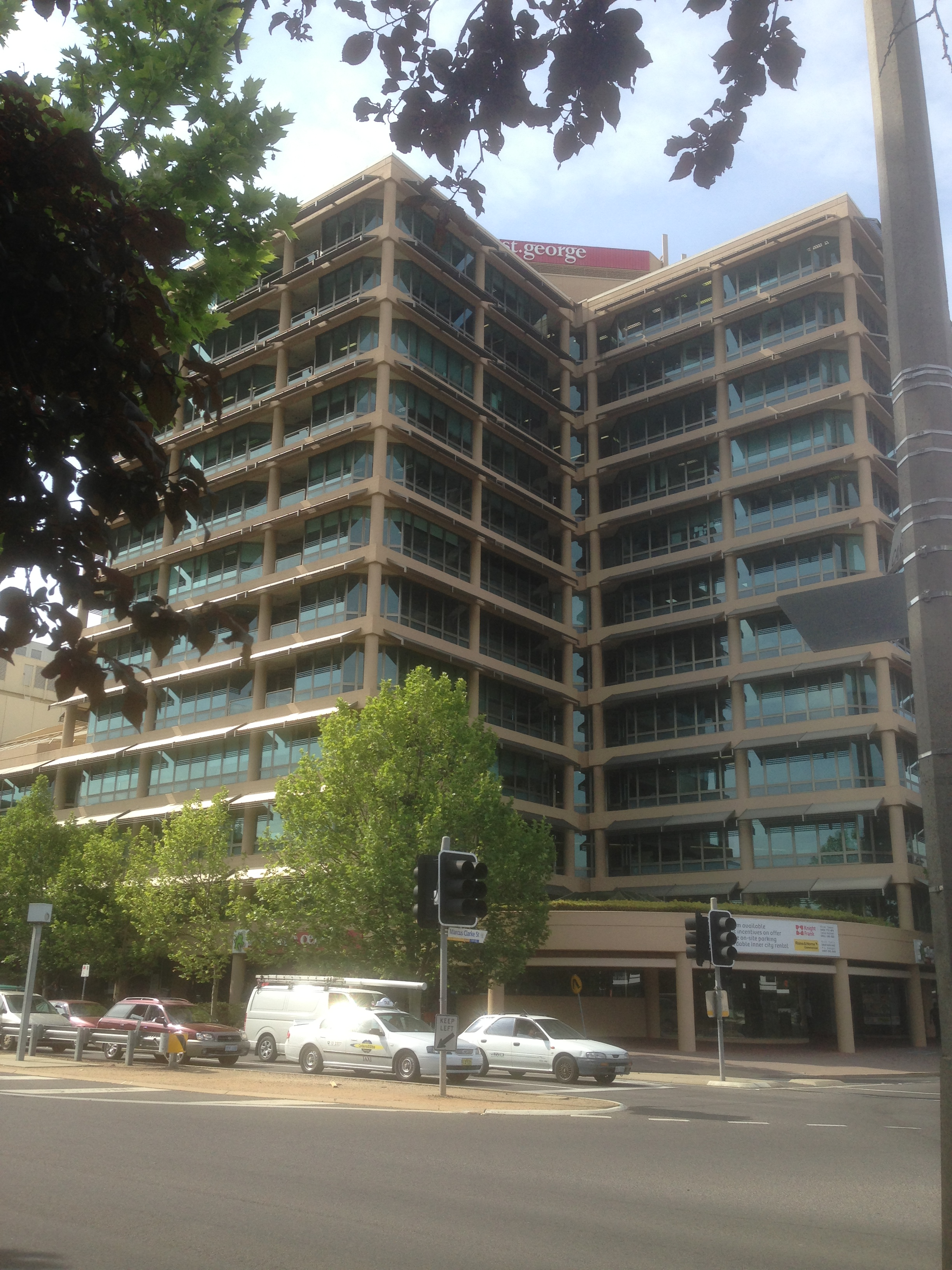
Building hosting the Embassy in Canberra

=== Multilateral organizations ===
| Organization | Host city | Host country | Mission | Concurrent accreditation | Ref. |
|---|---|---|---|---|---|
| Council of Europe | Strasbourg | France | Permanent Mission | | |
| European Union | Brussels | Belgium | Mission | | |
| NATO | Brussels | Belgium | Mission | | |
| United Nations | New York City | United States | Permanent Mission | Countries: Bahamas; Trinidad and Tobago | |
| United Nations | Geneva | Switzerland | Permanent Mission | Multilateral Organizations: Conference on Disarmament; World Health Organization; World Trade Organization | |
| United Nations | Vienna | Austria | Permanent Mission | Multilateral Organizations: International Atomic Energy Agency; OSCE; UNIDO; UNODC | |
| UNESCO | Paris | France | Permanent Mission | | |

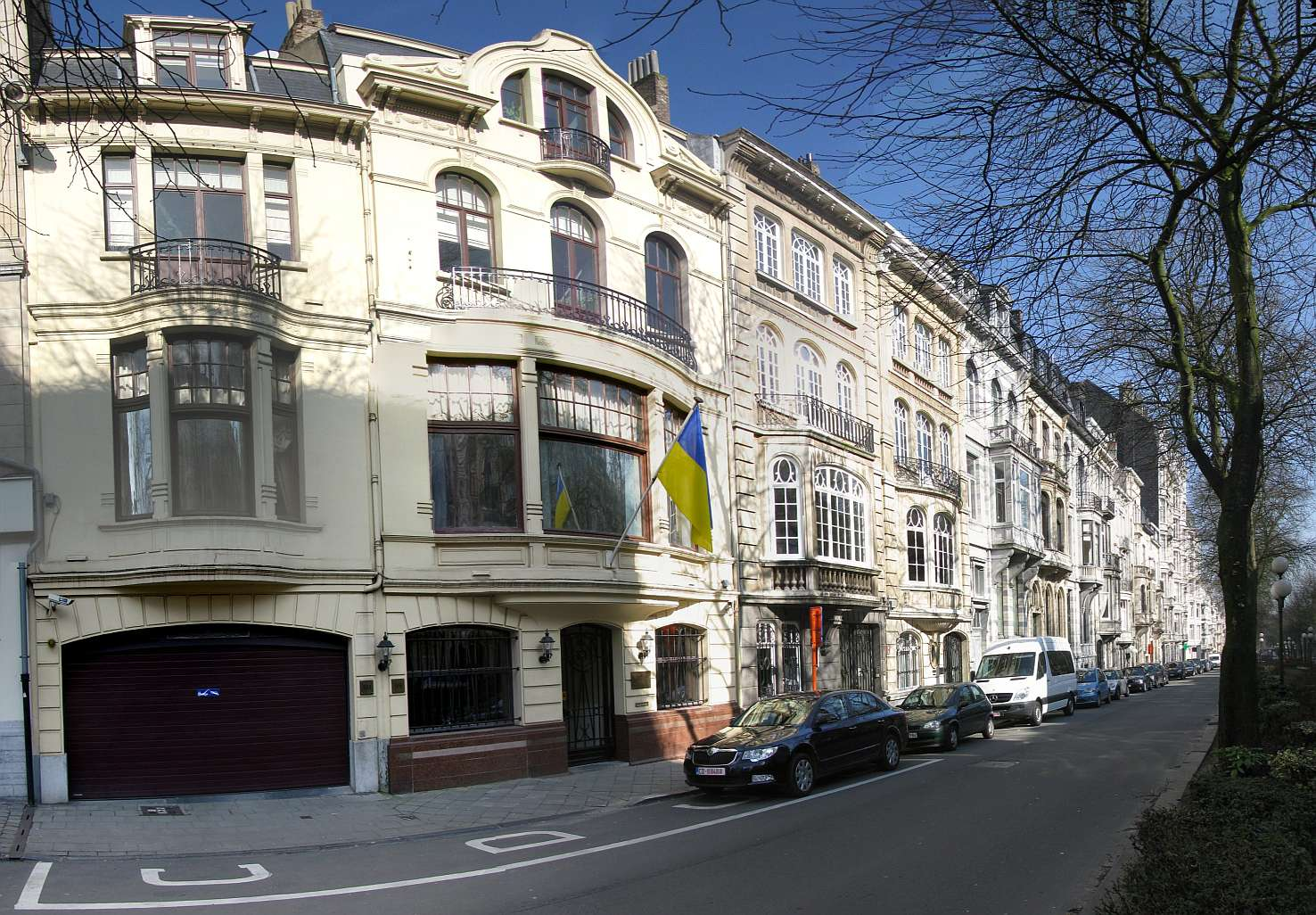
Mission to the European Union in Brussels

== Closed missions ==
=== Africa ===
| Host country | Host city | Mission | Year closed | Ref. |
|---|---|---|---|---|
| Gabon | Libreville | Embassy | 2012 | |
| Guinea | Conakry | Embassy | Unknown | |
| Libya | Tripoli | Embassy (Note: To be reopened.) | 2015 | |

=== Americas ===
| Host country | Host city | Mission | Year closed | Ref. |
|---|---|---|---|---|
| Brazil | Curitiba | Consulate | 2014 | |
| Cuba | Havana | Embassy | 2025 | |

=== Asia ===
| Host country | Host city | Mission | Year closed | Ref. |
|---|---|---|---|---|
| Georgia | Batumi | Consular agency | 2014 | |
| Israel | Haifa | Consulate-General | 2014 | |
| Kazakhstan | Almaty | Consulate-General | 2014 | |
| Syria | Damascus | Embassy | 2016 | |

=== Europe ===
| Host country | Host city | Mission | Year closed | Ref. |
|---|---|---|---|---|
| Belarus | Brest | Consulate-General | 2022 | |
| Bulgaria | Varna | Consulate-General | 2014 | |
| France | Marseille | Consulate | 2014 | |
| Germany | Bonn | Embassy branch office | 2005 | |
| Romania | Suceava | Consulate-General | 2014 | |
| Russia | Moscow | Embassy | 2022 | |
| Russia | Nizhny Novgorod | Consulate-General | 2014 | |
| Russia | Rostov-on-Don | Consulate-General | 2022 | |
| Russia | Saint Petersburg | Consulate-General | 2022 | |
| Russia | Novosibirsk | Consulate | 2022 | |
| Russia | Yekaterinburg | Consulate | 2022 | |

== Missions to open ==
| Host country | Host city | Mission | Ref. |
|---|---|---|---|
| Colombia | Bogotá | Embassy | |
| Dominican Republic | Santo Domingo | Embassy | |
| Guyana | Georgetown | Embassy | |
| Iraq | Erbil | Consulate-General | |
| Libya | Tripoli | Embassy | |
| Paraguay | Asunción | Embassy | |
| South Africa | Cape Town | Consulate-General | |
| Syria | Damascus | Embassy | |
| Uruguay | Montevideo | Embassy | |
| Zambia | Lusaka | Embassy | |

== See also ==
- Foreign relations of Ukraine
- List of diplomatic missions in Ukraine
- Visa policy of Ukraine
