= Results of the 2012 Ukrainian parliamentary election in the foreign electoral district =

2012 Ukrainian parliamentary election in the foreign electoral district
← 2007	28 October 2012	2014 →
- Registered: 424,536 (▼8,406)
- Turnout: 4.85% (▼1.15pp)
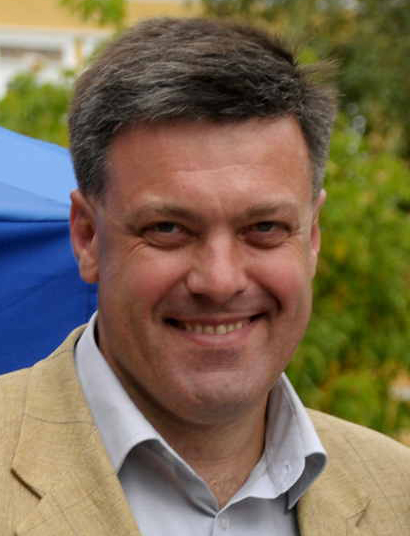

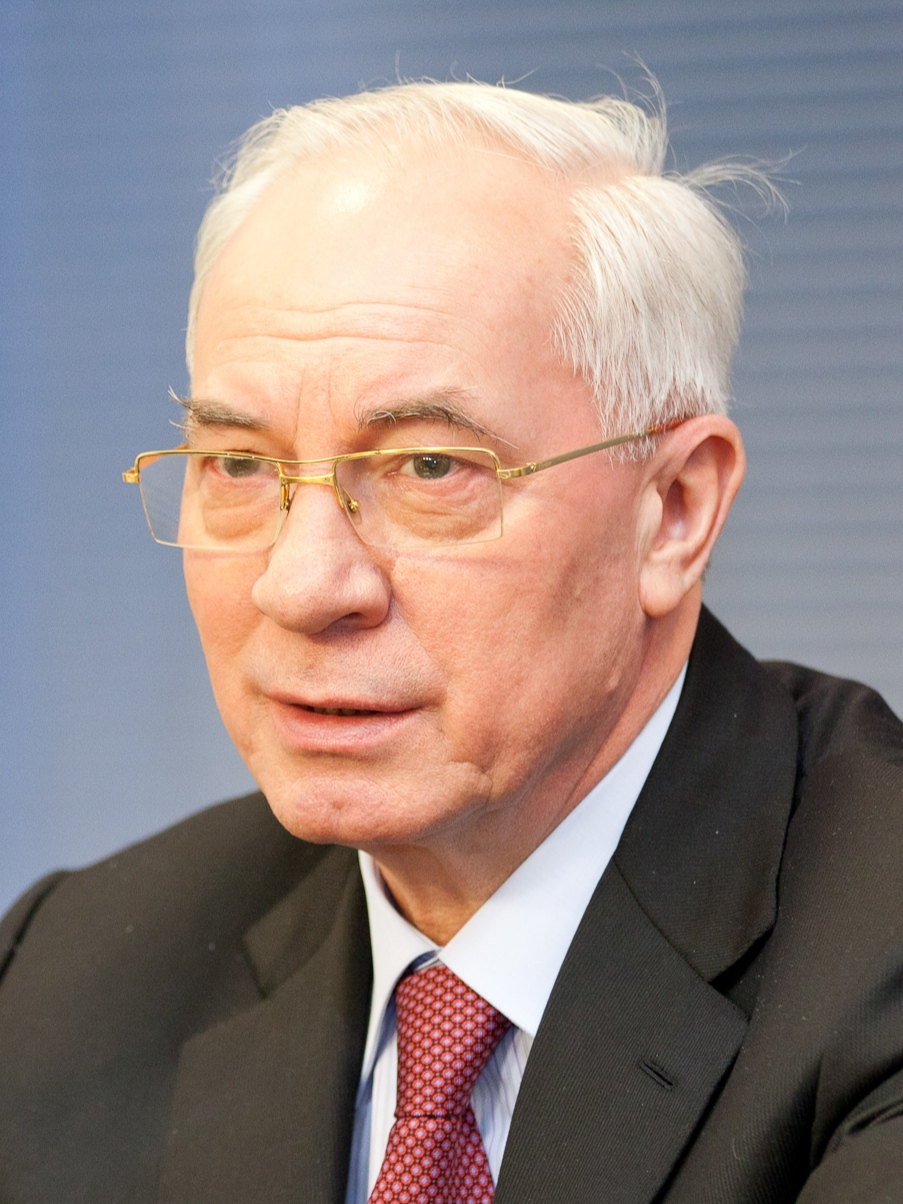

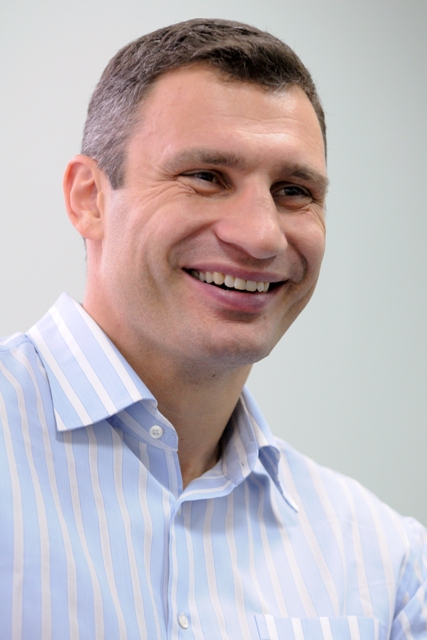

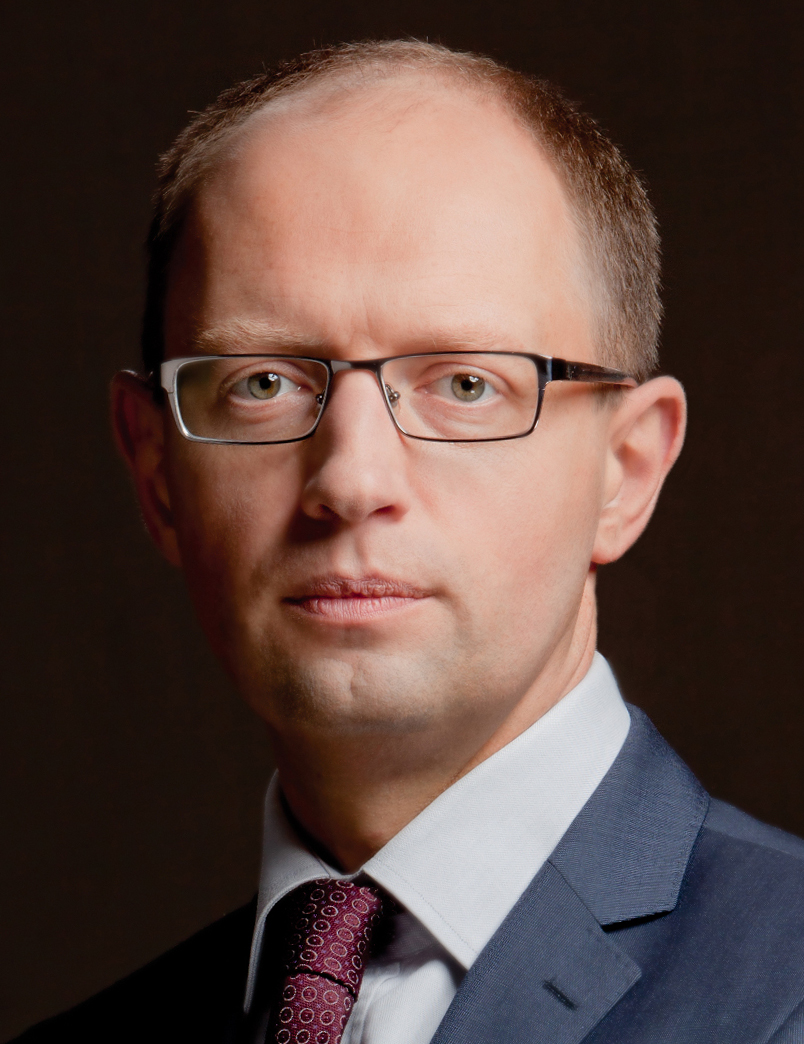

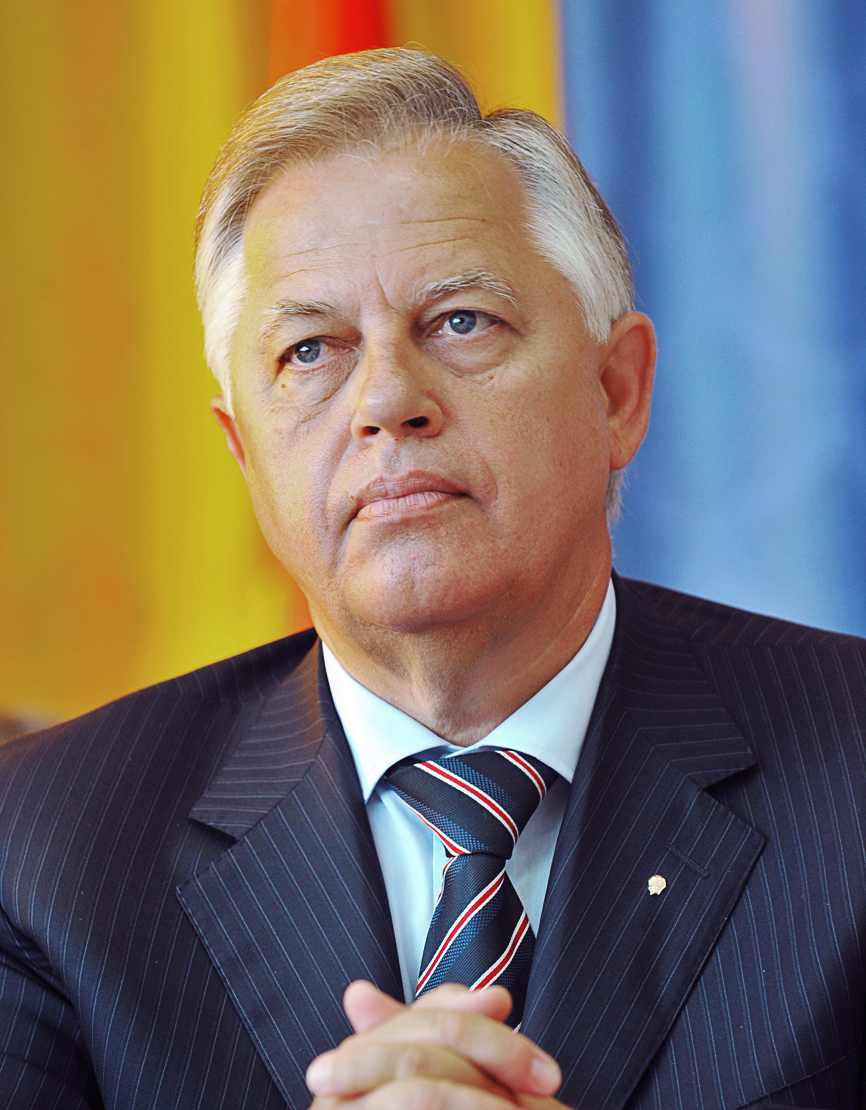

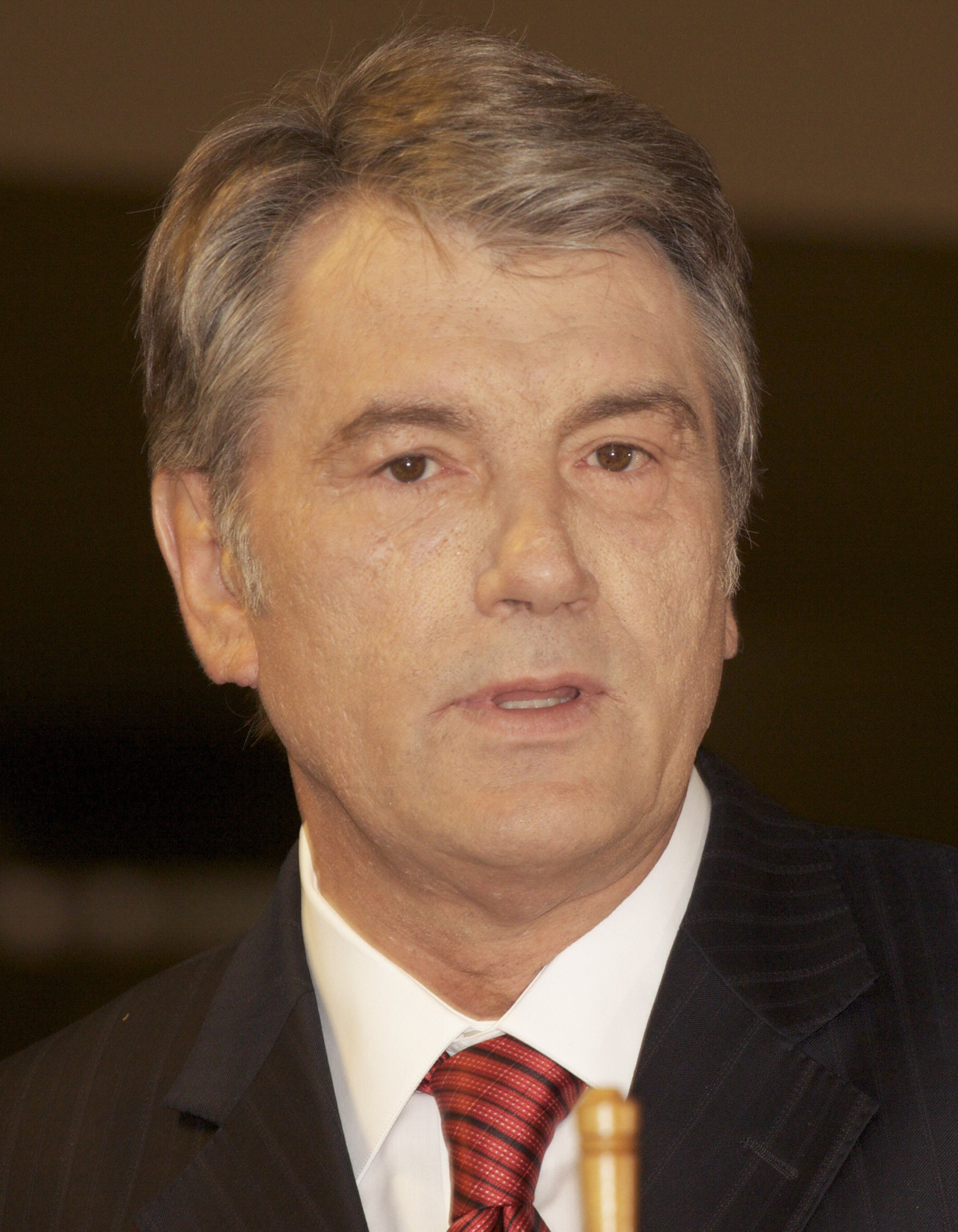
	First party	Second party	Third party
Leader	Oleh Tyahnybok	Mykola Azarov	Vitali Klitschko
Party	Svoboda	Party of Regions	UDAR
Popular vote	4,827	4,753	4,517
Percentage	23.63%	23.27%	22.11
Swing	▲21.35pp	▼3.18pp	New
	Fourth party	Fifth party	Sixth party
Leader	Arseniy Yatsenyuk (Note: Technically leader, as the No.1 on the list, Yulia Tymoshenko, was imprisoned at the time.)	Petro Symonenko	Viktor Yushchenko
Party	Batkivshchyna	KPU	Our Ukraine
Popular vote	4,054	707	428
Percentage	19.85	3.46	2.09
Swing	▼13.28pp	▲1.82pp	▼23.43pp
- Election results per polling stations
Prime Minister before election
Mykola Azarov
Party of Regions
Elected Prime Minister
Mykola Azarov
Party of Regions

The 2012 Ukrainian parliamentary election was held on 28 October 2012, where 424,536 diaspora voters could vote.

The foreign electoral district in Ukraine doesn't attribute seats to the diaspora, and overseas citizens could vote only in the party-list section of the election, which is responsible for choosing half of the Verkhovna Rada composition, which is 225 seats.

== Background ==
Ukraine has approximately 10 million of its citizens living abroad with a right to vote in the presidential and parliamentary elections. However, Ukrainian electoral law does not allow, nor does it have any mechanisms for postal or early voting, which complicates voting for people in countries without embassies or consulates, resulting in low turnout each election. Both the government and political parties usually ignore and neglect overseas voters, with the latter refusing to campaign and mobilize diaspora. Still, pro-European and nationalist forces usually overperform in the expatriate voting, compared to nationwide overall results.

== Results ==
Party	Votes	%	+/–
Svoboda	4,827	23.64	+21.35
Party of Regions	4,753	23.27	-3.18
Ukrainian Democratic Alliance for Reform	4,517	22.12	New
Batkivshchyna	4,054	19.85	-13.28
Communist Party of Ukraine	707	3.46	+1.82
Our Ukraine	428	2.10	-23.43
Ukraine – Forward!	204	1.00	New
Party of Pensioners of Ukraine	171	0.84	+0.52
Russian Bloc	142	0.70	New
Socialist Party of Ukraine	129	0.63	-0.52
Green Planet	79	0.39	New
Greens	69	0.34	New
Party of Greens of Ukraine	68	0.33	-0.30
Ukraine of the Future	51	0.25	New
Radical Party of Oleh Liashko	45	0.22	New
Native Homeland	36	0.18	New
Ukrainian National Assembly	35	0.17	New
People's Labor Union of Ukraine	31	0.15	New
New Politics	28	0.14	New
Liberal Party of Ukraine	25	0.12	New
Hromada	23	0.11	New
Total	20,422	100.00	–
Valid votes	20,422	99.28	
Invalid/blank votes	148	0.72	
Total votes	20,570	100.00	
Registered voters/turnout	424,536	4.85	
Source: CEC

== Results per polling stations/embassies ==
In 2012, the foreign electoral district was composed of 117 polling stations in 77 countries, however, some polling stations have been a home for voters from multiple countries, e.g. the Embassy of Ukraine to Singapore, where Ukrainians living in Singapore, Indonesia and Brunei could vote.

Below is the result of the election in the numerical order of the polling stations, with some countries' stations, like Italy, which has three separate ones, combined into a single result table.

=== Polling station in Canberra ===
Australia and New Zealand
Party	Votes	%
Svoboda	13	30.23
Batkivshchyna	10	23.26
Party of Regions	8	18.60
Ukrainian Democratic Alliance for Reform	5	11.63
Our Ukraine	3	6.98
Russian Bloc	3	6.98
Communist Party of Ukraine	1	2.33
Others	0	0.00
Total	43	100.00
Valid votes	43	100.00
Invalid/blank votes	0	0.00
Total votes	43	100.00
Registered voters/turnout	1,999	2.15
Source: CEC

=== Polling station in Vienna ===
Austria
Party	Votes	%
Ukrainian Democratic Alliance for Reform	96	27.20
Svoboda	95	26.91
Batkivshchyna	86	24.36
Party of Regions	49	13.88
Our Ukraine	10	2.83
Communist Party of Ukraine	6	1.70
Ukrainian National Assembly	4	1.13
Ukraine – Forward!	2	0.57
Socialist Party of Ukraine	3	0.85
Party of Pensioners of Ukraine	1	0.28
Radical Party of Oleh Liashko	1	0.28
Others	0	0.00
Total	353	100.00
Valid votes	353	99.72
Invalid/blank votes	1	0.28
Total votes	354	100.00
Registered voters/turnout	5,071	6.98
Source: CEC

=== Polling station in Baku ===
Azerbaijan
Party	Votes	%
Party of Regions	25	35.71
Ukrainian Democratic Alliance for Reform	19	27.14
Batkivshchyna	11	15.71
Svoboda	5	7.14
Our Ukraine	2	2.86
Socialist Party of Ukraine	2	2.86
Party of Pensioners of Ukraine	1	1.43
Russian Bloc	1	1.43
Green Planet	1	1.43
Party of Greens of Ukraine	1	1.43
Communist Party of Ukraine	1	1.43
Ukraine – Forward!	1	1.43
Others	0	0.00
Total	70	100.00
Valid votes	70	98.59
Invalid/blank votes	1	1.41
Total votes	71	100.00
Registered voters/turnout	219	32.42
Source: CEC

=== Polling station in Algiers ===
Algeria
Party	Votes	%
Party of Regions	21	42.86
Ukrainian Democratic Alliance for Reform	6	12.24
Batkivshchyna	5	10.20
Ukraine – Forward!	4	8.16
Svoboda	3	6.12
Our Ukraine	3	6.12
Ukraine of the Future	1	2.04
New Politics	1	2.04
Russian Bloc	1	2.04
Green Planet	1	2.04
Party of Pensioners of Ukraine	1	2.04
Radical Party of Oleh Liashko	1	2.04
Communist Party of Ukraine	1	2.04
Others	0	0.00
Total	49	100.00
Valid votes	49	96.08
Invalid/blank votes	2	3.92
Total votes	51	100.00
Registered voters/turnout	187	27.27
Source: CEC

=== Polling station in Buenos Aires ===
Argentina, Chile, Paraguay and Uruguay
Party	Votes	%
Svoboda	21	28.77
Ukrainian Democratic Alliance for Reform	18	24.66
Party of Regions	9	12.33
Batkivshchyna	5	6.85
Communist Party of Ukraine	4	5.48
Our Ukraine	3	4.11
Ukrainian National Assembly	2	2.74
Russian Bloc	2	2.74
People's Labor Union of Ukraine	2	2.74
Hromada	1	1.37
Greens	1	1.37
Party of Greens of Ukraine	1	1.37
Party of Pensioners of Ukraine	1	1.37
Green Planet	1	1.37
Ukraine of the Future	1	1.37
Socialist Party of Ukraine	1	1.37
Others	0	0.00
Total	73	100.00
Valid votes	73	98.65
Invalid/blank votes	1	1.35
Total votes	74	100.00
Registered voters/turnout	807	9.17
Source: CEC

=== Polling station in Brussels ===
Belgium and Luxembourg
Party	Votes	%
Ukrainian Democratic Alliance for Reform	125	33.24
Batkivshchyna	96	25.53
Svoboda	65	17.29
Party of Regions	60	15.96
Communist Party of Ukraine	5	1.33
Our Ukraine	5	1.33
Socialist Party of Ukraine	4	1.06
Russian Bloc	3	0.80
Party of Greens of Ukraine	3	0.80
Greens	3	0.80
Ukraine of the Future	3	0.80
Party of Pensioners of Ukraine	2	0.53
Green Planet	1	0.27
Ukraine – Forward!	1	0.27
Others	0	0.00
Total	376	100.00
Valid votes	376	97.66
Invalid/blank votes	9	2.34
Total votes	385	100.00
Registered voters/turnout	1,998	19.27
Source: CEC

=== Polling stations in Minsk and Brest ===
Belarus
Party	Votes	%
Party of Regions	112	31.20
Batkivshchyna	69	19.22
Ukrainian Democratic Alliance for Reform	68	18.94
Svoboda	28	7.80
Communist Party of Ukraine	27	7.52
Ukraine – Forward!	13	3.62
Our Ukraine	9	2.51
Socialist Party of Ukraine	6	1.67
Party of Pensioners of Ukraine	5	1.39
Party of Greens of Ukraine	3	0.84
New Politics	3	0.84
Russian Bloc	3	0.84
Ukraine of the Future	2	0.56
People's Labor Union of Ukraine	2	0.56
Hromada	2	0.56
Green Planet	2	0.56
Radical Party of Oleh Liashko	2	0.56
Native Homeland	1	0.28
Ukrainian National Assembly	1	0.28
Greens	1	0.28
Liberal Party of Ukraine	0	0.00
Total	359	100.00
Valid votes	359	99.72
Invalid/blank votes	1	0.28
Total votes	360	100.00
Registered voters/turnout	11,296	3.19
Source: CEC

=== Polling station in Sofia ===
Bulgaria
Party	Votes	%
Party of Regions	85	37.12
Ukrainian Democratic Alliance for Reform	63	27.51
Batkivshchyna	28	12.23
Svoboda	12	5.24
Communist Party of Ukraine	10	4.37
Socialist Party of Ukraine	6	2.62
Ukraine – Forward!	5	2.18
Party of Pensioners of Ukraine	3	1.31
Ukrainian National Assembly	3	1.31
Russian Bloc	2	0.87
Hromada	2	0.87
Our Ukraine	2	0.87
Greens	2	0.87
Green Planet	1	0.44
Liberal Party of Ukraine	1	0.44
Party of Greens of Ukraine	1	0.44
Native Homeland	1	0.44
People's Labor Union of Ukraine	1	0.44
New Politics	1	0.44
Others	0	0.00
Total	229	100.00
Valid votes	229	99.57
Invalid/blank votes	1	0.43
Total votes	230	100.00
Registered voters/turnout	2,975	7.73
Source: CEC

=== Polling station in Brasília ===
Brazil, Bolivia, Guyana and Suriname
Party	Votes	%
Party of Regions	15	38.46
Ukrainian Democratic Alliance for Reform	10	25.64
Batkivshchyna	6	15.38
Svoboda	4	10.26
Ukraine – Forward!	1	2.56
Russian Bloc	1	2.56
Greens	1	2.56
Green Planet	1	2.56
Others	0	0.00
Total	39	100.00
Valid votes	39	100.00
Invalid/blank votes	0	0.00
Total votes	39	100.00
Registered voters/turnout	110	35.45
Source: CEC

=== Polling station in Hanoi ===
Vietnam
Party	Votes	%
Party of Regions	11	42.31
Ukrainian Democratic Alliance for Reform	9	34.62
Svoboda	3	11.54
Batkivshchyna	2	7.69
Communist Party of Ukraine	1	3.85
Others	0	0.00
Total	26	100.00
Valid votes	26	100.00
Invalid/blank votes	0	0.00
Total votes	26	100.00
Registered voters/turnout	113	23.01
Source: CEC

=== Polling stations in London and Edinburgh ===
United Kingdom
Party	Votes	%
Svoboda	135	35.25
Batkivshchyna	109	28.46
Ukrainian Democratic Alliance for Reform	83	21.67
Party of Regions	47	12.27
Ukraine of the Future	3	0.78
Communist Party of Ukraine	2	0.52
Our Ukraine	2	0.52
Greens	1	0.26
Party of Greens of Ukraine	1	0.26
Others	0	0.00
Total	383	100.00
Valid votes	383	99.22
Invalid/blank votes	3	0.78
Total votes	386	100.00
Registered voters/turnout	1,156	33.39
Source: CEC

=== Polling station in Yerevan ===
Armenia
Party	Votes	%
Party of Regions	45	51.72
Ukrainian Democratic Alliance for Reform	12	13.79
Batkivshchyna	10	11.49
Socialist Party of Ukraine	4	4.60
Our Ukraine	4	4.60
Communist Party of Ukraine	3	3.45
Svoboda	3	3.45
Russian Bloc	3	3.45
Party of Greens of Ukraine	1	1.15
Party of Pensioners of Ukraine	1	1.15
People's Labor Union of Ukraine	1	1.15
Others	0	0.00
Total	87	100.00
Valid votes	87	100.00
Invalid/blank votes	0	0.00
Total votes	87	100.00
Registered voters/turnout	344	25.29
Source: CEC

=== Polling stations in Athens and Thessaloniki ===
Greece
Party	Votes	%
Batkivshchyna	233	30.94
Svoboda	228	30.28
Ukrainian Democratic Alliance for Reform	144	19.12
Party of Regions	64	8.50
Our Ukraine	24	3.19
Green Planet	14	1.86
Communist Party of Ukraine	13	1.73
Ukraine – Forward!	7	0.93
Ukraine of the Future	7	0.93
Party of Pensioners of Ukraine	4	0.53
Russian Bloc	3	0.40
Socialist Party of Ukraine	3	0.40
Greens	3	0.40
Liberal Party of Ukraine	1	0.13
Radical Party of Oleh Liashko	1	0.13
Ukrainian National Assembly	1	0.13
People's Labor Union of Ukraine	1	0.13
Hromada	1	0.13
New Politics	1	0.13
Others	0	0.00
Total	753	100.00
Valid votes	753	99.08
Invalid/blank votes	7	0.92
Total votes	760	100.00
Registered voters/turnout	4,468	17.01
Source: CEC

=== Polling stations in Tbilisi and Batumi ===
Georgia
Party	Votes	%
Party of Regions	88	34.11
Ukrainian Democratic Alliance for Reform	72	27.91
Batkivshchyna	35	13.57
Svoboda	22	8.53
Communist Party of Ukraine	11	4.26
Our Ukraine	10	3.88
Ukraine – Forward!	6	2.33
Russian Bloc	4	1.55
Native Homeland	2	0.78
Hromada	2	0.78
Green Planet	2	0.78
Ukraine of the Future	1	0.39
Socialist Party of Ukraine	1	0.39
Liberal Party of Ukraine	1	0.39
Party of Greens of Ukraine	1	0.39
Others	0	0.00
Total	258	100.00
Valid votes	258	99.61
Invalid/blank votes	1	0.39
Total votes	259	100.00
Registered voters/turnout	488	53.07
Source: CEC

=== Polling station in Copenhagen ===
Denmark
Party	Votes	%
Ukrainian Democratic Alliance for Reform	37	32.46
Svoboda	32	28.07
Batkivshchyna	27	23.68
Party of Regions	9	7.89
Ukraine – Forward!	2	1.75
Communist Party of Ukraine	2	1.75
Party of Greens of Ukraine	1	0.88
Native Homeland	1	0.88
Party of Pensioners of Ukraine	1	0.88
Our Ukraine	1	0.88
Socialist Party of Ukraine	1	0.88
Others	0	0.00
Total	114	100.00
Valid votes	114	99.13
Invalid/blank votes	1	0.87
Total votes	115	100.00
Registered voters/turnout	1,248	9.21
Source: CEC

=== Polling station in Tallinn ===
Estonia
Party	Votes	%
Party of Regions	395	51.23
Ukrainian Democratic Alliance for Reform	107	13.88
Communist Party of Ukraine	61	7.91
Batkivshchyna	55	7.13
Svoboda	41	5.32
Our Ukraine	29	3.76
Party of Pensioners of Ukraine	20	2.59
Socialist Party of Ukraine	11	1.43
Ukraine – Forward!	10	1.30
Russian Bloc	9	1.17
Radical Party of Oleh Liashko	5	0.65
Native Homeland	5	0.65
Ukraine of the Future	5	0.65
Green Planet	5	0.65
New Politics	4	0.52
People's Labor Union of Ukraine	3	0.39
Party of Greens of Ukraine	3	0.39
Greens	2	0.26
Ukrainian National Assembly	1	0.13
Others	0	0.00
Total	771	100.00
Valid votes	771	99.10
Invalid/blank votes	7	0.90
Total votes	778	100.00
Registered voters/turnout	4,178	18.62
Source: CEC

=== Polling station in Cairo ===
Egypt, Sudan, Comoros and Ethiopia
Party	Votes	%
Party of Regions	23	38.33
Ukrainian Democratic Alliance for Reform	15	25.00
Batkivshchyna	12	20.00
Svoboda	4	6.67
Liberal Party of Ukraine	1	1.67
Russian Bloc	1	1.67
Our Ukraine	1	1.67
Party of Greens of Ukraine	1	1.67
Communist Party of Ukraine	1	1.67
Radical Party of Oleh Liashko	1	1.67
Others	0	0.00
Total	60	100.00
Valid votes	60	96.77
Invalid/blank votes	2	3.23
Total votes	62	100.00
Registered voters/turnout	503	12.33
Source: CEC

=== Polling stations in Tel Aviv and Haifa ===
Israel
Party	Votes	%
Party of Regions	783	62.69
Ukrainian Democratic Alliance for Reform	157	12.57
Batkivshchyna	124	9.93
Communist Party of Ukraine	57	4.56
Party of Pensioners of Ukraine	37	2.96
Svoboda	24	1.92
Our Ukraine	13	1.04
Socialist Party of Ukraine	8	0.64
Ukraine – Forward!	8	0.64
Russian Bloc	8	0.64
Ukraine of the Future	5	0.40
People's Labor Union of Ukraine	4	0.32
Party of Greens of Ukraine	4	0.32
New Politics	4	0.32
Liberal Party of Ukraine	4	0.32
Green Planet	3	0.24
Ukrainian National Assembly	2	0.16
Radical Party of Oleh Liashko	2	0.16
Greens	1	0.08
Native Homeland	1	0.08
Others	0	0.00
Total	1,249	100.00
Valid votes	1,249	98.66
Invalid/blank votes	17	1.34
Total votes	1,266	100.00
Registered voters/turnout	51,762	2.45
Source: CEC

=== Polling station in New Delhi ===
India, Bangladesh, Sri Lanka, Nepal and Maldives
Party	Votes	%
Party of Regions	18	40.91
Ukrainian Democratic Alliance for Reform	9	20.45
Batkivshchyna	8	18.18
Svoboda	4	9.09
Greens	2	4.55
Party of Greens of Ukraine	1	2.27
Our Ukraine	1	2.27
New Politics	1	2.27
Others	0	0.00
Total	44	100.00
Valid votes	44	100.00
Invalid/blank votes	0	0.00
Total votes	44	100.00
Registered voters/turnout	112	39.29
Source: CEC

=== Polling station in Tehran ===
Iran
Party	Votes	%
Party of Regions	23	45.10
Ukrainian Democratic Alliance for Reform	12	23.53
Batkivshchyna	6	11.76
Svoboda	5	9.80
Russian Bloc	1	1.96
Our Ukraine	1	1.96
Party of Greens of Ukraine	1	1.96
Communist Party of Ukraine	1	1.96
Ukraine – Forward!	1	1.96
Others	0	0.00
Total	51	100.00
Valid votes	51	100.00
Invalid/blank votes	0	0.00
Total votes	51	100.00
Registered voters/turnout	203	25.12
Source: CEC

=== Polling station in Dublin ===
Ireland
Party	Votes	%
Svoboda	23	30.26
Batkivshchyna	22	28.95
Ukrainian Democratic Alliance for Reform	17	22.37
Party of Regions	8	10.53
Our Ukraine	3	3.95
Green Planet	2	2.63
Socialist Party of Ukraine	1	1.32
Others	0	0.00
Total	76	100.00
Valid votes	76	100.00
Invalid/blank votes	0	0.00
Total votes	76	100.00
Registered voters/turnout	198	38.38
Source: CEC

=== Polling stations in Madrid, Barcelona and Málaga ===
Spain
Party	Votes	%
Svoboda	742	51.00
Batkivshchyna	403	27.70
Ukrainian Democratic Alliance for Reform	193	13.26
Party of Regions	52	3.57
Our Ukraine	35	2.41
Communist Party of Ukraine	6	0.41
Russian Bloc	3	0.21
Ukrainian National Assembly	3	0.21
Party of Pensioners of Ukraine	3	0.21
New Politics	3	0.21
Native Homeland	2	0.14
People's Labor Union of Ukraine	1	0.07
Ukraine of the Future	1	0.07
Liberal Party of Ukraine	1	0.07
Radical Party of Oleh Liashko	1	0.07
Green Planet	1	0.07
Party of Greens of Ukraine	1	0.07
Greens	1	0.07
Socialist Party of Ukraine	1	0.07
Hromada	1	0.07
Ukraine – Forward!	1	0.07
Total	1,455	100.00
Valid votes	1,455	98.85
Invalid/blank votes	17	1.15
Total votes	1,472	100.00
Registered voters/turnout	8,751	16.82
Source: CEC

=== Polling stations in Rome, Milan and Naples ===
Italy, Malta and San Marino
Party	Votes	%
Svoboda	511	43.34
Batkivshchyna	357	30.28
Ukrainian Democratic Alliance for Reform	180	15.27
Our Ukraine	45	3.82
Party of Regions	44	3.73
Ukraine – Forward!	9	0.76
Communist Party of Ukraine	7	0.59
Ukraine of the Future	3	0.25
Native Homeland	3	0.25
Party of Pensioners of Ukraine	3	0.25
Radical Party of Oleh Liashko	2	0.17
Greens	2	0.17
Ukrainian National Assembly	2	0.17
Socialist Party of Ukraine	2	0.17
Hromada	2	0.17
Green Planet	2	0.17
Liberal Party of Ukraine	2	0.17
New Politics	1	0.08
Party of Greens of Ukraine	1	0.08
Russian Bloc	1	0.08
People's Labor Union of Ukraine	0	0.00
Total	1,179	100.00
Valid votes	1,179	99.66
Invalid/blank votes	4	0.34
Total votes	1,183	100.00
Registered voters/turnout	8,751	13.52
Source: CEC

=== Polling station in Amman ===
Jordan and Iraq
Party	Votes	%
Party of Regions	41	41.84
Ukrainian Democratic Alliance for Reform	17	17.35
Svoboda	9	9.18
Batkivshchyna	9	9.18
Communist Party of Ukraine	8	8.16
Party of Pensioners of Ukraine	6	6.12
Ukraine – Forward!	3	3.06
People's Labor Union of Ukraine	1	1.02
Russian Bloc	1	1.02
Our Ukraine	1	1.02
Green Planet	1	1.02
Greens	1	1.02
Others	0	0.00
Total	98	100.00
Valid votes	98	100.00
Invalid/blank votes	0	0.00
Total votes	98	100.00
Registered voters/turnout	560	17.50
Source: CEC

=== Polling stations in Astana and Almaty ===
Kazakhstan
Party	Votes	%
Ukrainian Democratic Alliance for Reform	37	34.91
Party of Regions	22	20.75
Svoboda	17	16.04
Batkivshchyna	12	11.32
Ukraine – Forward!	4	3.77
Our Ukraine	3	2.83
Party of Pensioners of Ukraine	2	1.89
Russian Bloc	2	1.89
Green Planet	2	1.89
Communist Party of Ukraine	1	0.94
Greens	1	0.94
Socialist Party of Ukraine	1	0.94
Party of Greens of Ukraine	1	0.94
Native Homeland	1	0.94
Others	0	0.00
Total	106	100.00
Valid votes	106	100.00
Invalid/blank votes	0	0.00
Total votes	106	100.00
Registered voters/turnout	1,074	9.87
Source: CEC

=== Polling stations in Ottawa and Toronto ===
Canada
Party	Votes	%
Svoboda	206	49.05
Batkivshchyna	98	23.33
Ukrainian Democratic Alliance for Reform	56	13.33
Party of Regions	23	5.48
Communist Party of Ukraine	13	3.10
Our Ukraine	11	2.62
Greens	3	0.71
Socialist Party of Ukraine	3	0.71
Party of Pensioners of Ukraine	2	0.48
Radical Party of Oleh Liashko	2	0.48
Ukraine – Forward!	1	0.24
Party of Greens of Ukraine	1	0.24
Hromada	1	0.24
Others	0	0.00
Total	420	100.00
Valid votes	420	99.76
Invalid/blank votes	1	0.24
Total votes	421	100.00
Registered voters/turnout	5,916	7.12
Source: CEC

=== Polling stations in Nairobi ===
Kenya, Tanzania, Rwanda, Malawi and Burundi
Party	Votes	%
Party of Regions	18	60.00
Ukrainian Democratic Alliance for Reform	5	16.67
Batkivshchyna	4	13.33
Russian Bloc	2	6.67
Svoboda	1	3.33
Others	0	0.00
Total	30	100.00
Valid votes	30	100.00
Invalid/blank votes	0	0.00
Total votes	30	100.00
Registered voters/turnout	48	62.50
Source: CEC

=== Polling stations in Bishkek ===
Kyrgyzstan
Party	Votes	%
Party of Regions	21	52.50
Ukrainian Democratic Alliance for Reform	8	20.00
Russian Bloc	3	7.50
Party of Pensioners of Ukraine	2	5.00
Batkivshchyna	2	5.00
Communist Party of Ukraine	2	5.00
Ukraine – Forward!	2	5.00
Others	0	0.00
Total	40	100.00
Valid votes	40	97.56
Invalid/blank votes	1	2.44
Total votes	41	100.00
Registered voters/turnout	126	32.54
Source: CEC

=== Polling stations in Beijing and Shanghai ===
China and Mongolia
Party	Votes	%
Ukrainian Democratic Alliance for Reform	43	39.09
Party of Regions	28	25.45
Batkivshchyna	21	19.09
Svoboda	8	7.27
Communist Party of Ukraine	4	3.64
Russian Bloc	2	1.82
Our Ukraine	1	0.91
People's Labor Union of Ukraine	1	0.91
Party of Greens of Ukraine	1	0.91
Ukraine – Forward!	1	0.91
Others	0	0.00
Total	110	100.00
Valid votes	110	98.21
Invalid/blank votes	2	1.79
Total votes	112	100.00
Registered voters/turnout	486	23.05
Source: CEC

=== Polling station in Nicosia ===
Cyprus
Party	Votes	%
Party of Regions	14	28.00
Batkivshchyna	12	24.00
Ukrainian Democratic Alliance for Reform	12	24.00
Svoboda	5	10.00
Our Ukraine	2	4.00
Communist Party of Ukraine	2	4.00
Green Planet	1	2.00
Party of Greens of Ukraine	1	2.00
Socialist Party of Ukraine	1	2.00
Others	0	0.00
Total	50	100.00
Valid votes	50	98.04
Invalid/blank votes	1	1.96
Total votes	51	100.00
Registered voters/turnout	181	28.18
Source: CEC

=== Polling station in Seoul ===
South Korea
Party	Votes	%
Batkivshchyna	13	30.95
Party of Regions	9	21.43
Ukrainian Democratic Alliance for Reform	8	19.05
Svoboda	4	9.52
Ukraine – Forward!	3	7.14
Our Ukraine	2	4.76
Socialist Party of Ukraine	1	2.38
Communist Party of Ukraine	1	2.38
Green Planet	1	2.38
Others	0	0.00
Total	42	100.00
Valid votes	42	100.00
Invalid/blank votes	0	0.00
Total votes	42	100.00
Registered voters/turnout	104	40.38
Source: CEC

=== Polling station in Havana ===
Cuba, Venezuela, Dominican Republic, Nicaragua, El Salvador and Honduras
Party	Votes	%
Party of Regions	15	15.62
Communist Party of Ukraine	13	13.54
Our Ukraine	12	12.50
Ukrainian Democratic Alliance for Reform	12	12.50
Party of Pensioners of Ukraine	9	9.38
Batkivshchyna	8	8.33
Russian Bloc	5	5.21
Socialist Party of Ukraine	5	5.21
Ukraine – Forward!	5	5.21
Svoboda	3	3.12
Party of Greens of Ukraine	2	2.08
Green Planet	2	2.08
Native Homeland	2	2.08
New Politics	1	1.04
Greens	1	1.04
Hromada	1	1.04
Others	0	0.00
Total	96	100.00
Valid votes	96	100.00
Invalid/blank votes	0	0.00
Total votes	96	100.00
Registered voters/turnout	369	26.02
Source: CEC

=== Polling station in Kuwait City ===
Kuwait
Party	Votes	%
Party of Regions	17	35.42
Ukrainian Democratic Alliance for Reform	13	27.08
Batkivshchyna	6	12.50
Svoboda	4	8.33
Party of Greens of Ukraine	2	4.17
Russian Bloc	2	4.17
Greens	1	2.08
Ukraine – Forward!	1	2.08
Communist Party of Ukraine	1	2.08
Socialist Party of Ukraine	1	2.08
Others	0	0.00
Total	48	100.00
Valid votes	48	100.00
Invalid/blank votes	0	0.00
Total votes	48	100.00
Registered voters/turnout	135	35.56
Source: CEC

=== Polling station in Riga ===
Latvia
Party	Votes	%
Party of Regions	97	37.16
Ukrainian Democratic Alliance for Reform	58	22.22
Batkivshchyna	39	14.94
Communist Party of Ukraine	23	8.81
Svoboda	20	7.66
Our Ukraine	7	2.68
Ukraine – Forward!	5	1.92
Ukrainian National Assembly	3	1.15
Socialist Party of Ukraine	2	0.77
Party of Pensioners of Ukraine	2	0.77
Green Planet	1	0.38
Russian Bloc	1	0.38
People's Labor Union of Ukraine	1	0.38
Greens	1	0.38
Radical Party of Oleh Liashko	1	0.38
Others	0	0.00
Total	261	100.00
Valid votes	261	98.12
Invalid/blank votes	5	1.88
Total votes	266	100.00
Registered voters/turnout	1,816	14.65
Source: CEC

=== Polling station in Vilnius ===
Lithuania
Party	Votes	%
Party of Regions	41	34.17
Ukrainian Democratic Alliance for Reform	24	20.00
Svoboda	19	15.83
Batkivshchyna	17	14.17
Communist Party of Ukraine	8	6.67
Ukraine – Forward!	2	1.67
Radical Party of Oleh Liashko	2	1.67
Russian Bloc	2	1.67
Socialist Party of Ukraine	1	0.83
Party of Pensioners of Ukraine	1	0.83
Our Ukraine	1	0.83
Ukrainian National Assembly	1	0.83
Green Planet	1	0.83
Others	0	0.00
Total	120	100.00
Valid votes	120	100.00
Invalid/blank votes	0	0.00
Total votes	120	100.00
Registered voters/turnout	1,305	9.20
Source: CEC

=== Polling station in Beirut ===
Lebanon
Party	Votes	%
Party of Regions	32	37.21
Batkivshchyna	13	15.12
Ukrainian Democratic Alliance for Reform	12	13.95
Communist Party of Ukraine	10	11.63
Svoboda	6	6.98
Ukraine – Forward!	5	5.81
Socialist Party of Ukraine	2	2.33
Party of Pensioners of Ukraine	1	1.16
Our Ukraine	1	1.16
Russian Bloc	1	1.16
Green Planet	1	1.16
Greens	1	1.16
Radical Party of Oleh Liashko	1	1.16
Others	0	0.00
Total	86	100.00
Valid votes	86	98.85
Invalid/blank votes	1	1.15
Total votes	87	100.00
Registered voters/turnout	1,486	5.85
Source: CEC

=== Polling station in Tripoli ===
Libya
Party	Votes	%
Ukrainian Democratic Alliance for Reform	15	31.91
Svoboda	14	29.79
Batkivshchyna	10	21.28
Party of Regions	6	12.77
Party of Pensioners of Ukraine	1	2.13
Ukraine – Forward!	1	2.13
Others	0	0.00
Total	47	100.00
Valid votes	47	97.92
Invalid/blank votes	1	2.08
Total votes	48	100.00
Registered voters/turnout	139	34.53
Source: CEC

=== Polling station in Skopje ===
North Macedonia
Party	Votes	%
Party of Regions	8	21.05
Svoboda	8	21.05
Ukrainian Democratic Alliance for Reform	7	18.42
Batkivshchyna	5	13.16
Ukraine – Forward!	3	7.89
Russian Bloc	3	7.89
Communist Party of Ukraine	2	5.26
Hromada	1	2.63
Our Ukraine	1	2.63
Others	0	0.00
Total	38	100.00
Valid votes	38	95.00
Invalid/blank votes	2	5.00
Total votes	40	100.00
Registered voters/turnout	76	52.63
Source: CEC

=== Polling station in Kuala Lumpur ===
Malaysia
Party	Votes	%
Ukrainian Democratic Alliance for Reform	7	30.43
Party of Regions	7	30.43
Batkivshchyna	6	26.09
Svoboda	3	13.04
Others	0	0.00
Total	23	100.00
Valid votes	23	100.00
Invalid/blank votes	0	0.00
Total votes	23	100.00
Registered voters/turnout	42	54.76
Source: CEC

=== Polling station in Rabat ===
Morocco, Mauritania and Guinea
Party	Votes	%
Party of Regions	11	24.44
Ukrainian Democratic Alliance for Reform	11	24.44
Batkivshchyna	10	22.22
Svoboda	7	15.56
Communist Party of Ukraine	2	4.44
Socialist Party of Ukraine	2	4.44
Green Planet	1	2.22
Russian Bloc	1	2.22
Others	0	0.00
Total	45	100.00
Valid votes	45	97.83
Invalid/blank votes	1	2.17
Total votes	46	100.00
Registered voters/turnout	290	15.86
Source: CEC

=== Polling station in Mexico City ===
Mexico, Panama, Guatemala and Costa Rica
Party	Votes	%
Party of Regions	11	28.95
Ukrainian Democratic Alliance for Reform	10	26.32
Batkivshchyna	8	21.05
Svoboda	4	10.53
Communist Party of Ukraine	4	10.53
Ukraine – Forward!	1	2.63
Others	0	0.00
Total	38	100.00
Valid votes	38	100.00
Invalid/blank votes	0	0.00
Total votes	38	100.00
Registered voters/turnout	129	29.46
Source: CEC

=== Polling stations in Chișinău and Bălți ===
Moldova
Party	Votes	%
Party of Regions	502	62.21
Communist Party of Ukraine	90	11.15
Ukrainian Democratic Alliance for Reform	63	7.81
Svoboda	42	5.20
Batkivshchyna	42	5.20
Ukraine – Forward!	15	1.86
Our Ukraine	11	1.36
Russian Bloc	10	1.24
Party of Pensioners of Ukraine	8	0.99
Socialist Party of Ukraine	5	0.62
Greens	5	0.62
Radical Party of Oleh Liashko	2	0.25
Ukrainian National Assembly	2	0.25
Hromada	2	0.25
Green Planet	2	0.25
Liberal Party of Ukraine	2	0.25
Native Homeland	1	0.12
New Politics	1	0.12
People's Labor Union of Ukraine	1	0.12
Party of Greens of Ukraine	1	0.12
Ukraine of the Future	0	0.00
Total	807	100.00
Valid votes	807	99.02
Invalid/blank votes	8	0.98
Total votes	815	100.00
Registered voters/turnout	70,093	1.16

=== Polling station in Abuja ===
Nigeria, Benin, Angola and Gabon
Party	Votes	%
Party of Regions	11	42.31
Ukrainian Democratic Alliance for Reform	7	26.92
Batkivshchyna	3	11.54
Ukraine – Forward!	2	7.69
Liberal Party of Ukraine	1	3.85
Our Ukraine	1	3.85
Svoboda	1	3.85
Others	0	0.00
Total	26	100.00
Valid votes	26	100.00
Invalid/blank votes	0	0.00
Total votes	26	100.00
Registered voters/turnout	199	13.07

=== Polling station in The Hague ===
Netherlands
Party	Votes	%
Ukrainian Democratic Alliance for Reform	37	31.90
Batkivshchyna	31	26.72
Svoboda	28	24.14
Party of Regions	13	11.21
Communist Party of Ukraine	4	3.45
Our Ukraine	1	0.86
Liberal Party of Ukraine	1	0.86
Socialist Party of Ukraine	1	0.86
Others	0	0.00
Total	116	100.00
Valid votes	116	100.00
Invalid/blank votes	0	0.00
Total votes	116	100.00
Registered voters/turnout	1,102	10.53

=== Polling stations in Berlin, Bohn, Hamburg, Munich and Frankfurt ===
Germany
Party	Votes	%
Ukrainian Democratic Alliance for Reform	748	36.68
Batkivshchyna	470	23.05
Svoboda	371	18.20
Party of Regions	299	14.66
Communist Party of Ukraine	61	2.99
Our Ukraine	21	1.03
Ukraine – Forward!	16	0.78
Party of Pensioners of Ukraine	13	0.64
Russian Bloc	9	0.44
Socialist Party of Ukraine	6	0.29
Radical Party of Oleh Liashko	6	0.29
Green Planet	4	0.20
Party of Greens of Ukraine	4	0.20
Ukrainian National Assembly	2	0.10
New Politics	2	0.10
Liberal Party of Ukraine	2	0.10
Native Homeland	1	0.05
Ukraine of the Future	1	0.05
Hromada	1	0.05
People's Labor Union of Ukraine	1	0.05
Greens	1	0.05
Total	2,039	100.00
Valid votes	2,039	99.46
Invalid/blank votes	11	0.54
Total votes	2,050	100.00
Registered voters/turnout	99,103	2.07

=== Polling station in Oslo ===
Norway
Party	Votes	%
Ukrainian Democratic Alliance for Reform	21	34.43
Batkivshchyna	14	22.95
Svoboda	10	16.39
Our Ukraine	7	11.48
Communist Party of Ukraine	4	6.56
Party of Regions	3	4.92
Radical Party of Oleh Liashko	1	1.64
Socialist Party of Ukraine	1	1.64
Others	0	0.00
Total	61	100.00
Valid votes	61	100.00
Invalid/blank votes	0	0.00
Total votes	61	100.00
Registered voters/turnout	238	25.63

=== Polling stations in Abu Dhabi and Dubai ===
United Arabic Emirates, Qatar and Bahrain
Party	Votes	%
Party of Regions	40	33.06
Ukrainian Democratic Alliance for Reform	25	20.66
Batkivshchyna	20	16.53
Svoboda	20	16.53
Russian Bloc	4	3.31
Our Ukraine	3	2.48
Communist Party of Ukraine	3	2.48
Green Planet	2	1.65
Ukraine – Forward!	2	1.65
Socialist Party of Ukraine	1	0.83
Party of Pensioners of Ukraine	1	0.83
Others	0	0.00
Total	121	100.00
Valid votes	121	99.18
Invalid/blank votes	1	0.82
Total votes	122	100.00
Registered voters/turnout	339	35.99

=== Polling station in Islamabad ===
United Arabic Emirates, Qatar and Bahrain
Party	Votes	%
Party of Regions	10	45.45
Ukrainian Democratic Alliance for Reform	4	18.18
Communist Party of Ukraine	3	13.64
Batkivshchyna	2	9.09
Svoboda	2	9.09
Party of Greens of Ukraine	1	4.55
Others	0	0.00
Total	22	100.00
Valid votes	22	100.00
Invalid/blank votes	0	0.00
Total votes	22	100.00
Registered voters/turnout	35	62.86

=== Polling station in Lima ===
Peru, Ecuador and Colombia
Party	Votes	%
Party of Regions	15	23.81
Batkivshchyna	14	22.22
Ukrainian Democratic Alliance for Reform	12	19.05
Our Ukraine	6	9.52
Russian Bloc	3	4.76
Native Homeland	3	4.76
Svoboda	2	3.17
Party of Pensioners of Ukraine	2	3.17
Communist Party of Ukraine	2	3.17
Ukrainian National Assembly	1	1.59
Socialist Party of Ukraine	1	1.59
Greens	1	1.59
Green Planet	1	1.59
Others	0	0.00
Total	63	100.00
Valid votes	63	100.00
Invalid/blank votes	0	0.00
Total votes	63	100.00
Registered voters/turnout	181	34.81

=== Polling station in Pretoria ===
South Africa, Zambia and Namibia
Party	Votes	%
Ukrainian Democratic Alliance for Reform	10	25.64
Batkivshchyna	9	23.08
Party of Regions	9	23.08
Svoboda	7	17.95
Hromada	2	5.13
Our Ukraine	1	2.56
Party of Greens of Ukraine	1	2.56
Others	0	0.00
Total	39	100.00
Valid votes	39	100.00
Invalid/blank votes	0	0.00
Total votes	39	100.00
Registered voters/turnout	190	20.53

=== Polling stations in Warsaw, Gdańsk, Kraków and Lublin ===
Poland
Party	Votes	%
Ukrainian Democratic Alliance for Reform	328	37.23
Batkivshchyna	250	28.38
Svoboda	189	21.45
Party of Regions	58	6.58
Our Ukraine	24	2.72
Communist Party of Ukraine	17	1.93
Green Planet	3	0.34
Party of Pensioners of Ukraine	3	0.34
Ukraine – Forward!	3	0.34
Native Homeland	2	0.23
Party of Greens of Ukraine	1	0.11
Ukraine of the Future	1	0.11
Greens	1	0.11
Ukrainian National Assembly	1	0.11
Others	0	0.00
Total	881	100.00
Valid votes	881	99.55
Invalid/blank votes	4	0.45
Total votes	885	100.00
Registered voters/turnout	6,604	13.40

=== Polling stations in Lisbon and Porto ===
Portugal
Party	Votes	%
Svoboda	219	41.01
Batkivshchyna	150	28.09
Ukrainian Democratic Alliance for Reform	88	16.48
Party of Regions	38	7.12
Our Ukraine	10	1.87
Communist Party of Ukraine	10	1.87
Party of Pensioners of Ukraine	3	0.56
Russian Bloc	3	0.56
Socialist Party of Ukraine	3	0.56
Ukraine – Forward!	2	0.37
Radical Party of Oleh Liashko	2	0.37
Green Planet	2	0.37
New Politics	1	0.19
People's Labor Union of Ukraine	1	0.19
Greens	1	0.19
Ukraine of the Future	1	0.19
Others	0	0.00
Total	534	100.00
Valid votes	534	100.00
Invalid/blank votes	0	0.00
Total votes	534	100.00
Registered voters/turnout	3,475	15.37

=== Polling stations in Moscow, Rostov-on-Don, Saint Petersburg, Nizhniy Novgorod, Yekaterinburg and Novosibirsk ===
Russia
Party	Votes	%
Party of Regions	252	34.24
Ukrainian Democratic Alliance for Reform	134	18.21
Batkivshchyna	124	16.85
Svoboda	103	13.99
Communist Party of Ukraine	54	7.34
Ukraine – Forward!	15	2.04
Russian Bloc	12	1.63
Socialist Party of Ukraine	8	1.09
Our Ukraine	7	0.95
Party of Greens of Ukraine	5	0.68
Greens	4	0.54
Radical Party of Oleh Liashko	4	0.54
Party of Pensioners of Ukraine	4	0.54
People's Labor Union of Ukraine	3	0.41
Ukraine of the Future	3	0.41
Native Homeland	2	0.27
Liberal Party of Ukraine	1	0.14
Ukrainian National Assembly	1	0.14
Others	0	0.00
Total	736	100.00
Valid votes	736	99.33
Invalid/blank votes	5	0.67
Total votes	741	100.00
Registered voters/turnout	54,759	1.35

=== Polling stations in Bucharest and Suceava ===
Romania
Party	Votes	%
Party of Regions	71	66.98
Ukrainian Democratic Alliance for Reform	10	9.43
Svoboda	10	9.43
Batkivshchyna	9	8.49
Party of Greens of Ukraine	1	0.94
Party of Pensioners of Ukraine	1	0.94
Our Ukraine	1	0.94
Communist Party of Ukraine	1	0.94
Greens	1	0.94
Socialist Party of Ukraine	1	0.94
Others	0	0.00
Total	106	100.00
Valid votes	106	98.15
Invalid/blank votes	2	1.85
Total votes	108	100.00
Registered voters/turnout	364	29.67

=== Polling station in Riyadh ===
Saudi Arabia, Oman and Yemen
Party	Votes	%
Party of Regions	11	37.93
Communist Party of Ukraine	4	13.79
Ukrainian Democratic Alliance for Reform	4	13.79
Batkivshchyna	3	10.34
Ukraine – Forward!	2	6.90
Svoboda	2	6.90
Socialist Party of Ukraine	2	6.90
Russian Bloc	1	3.45
Others	0	0.00
Total	29	100.00
Valid votes	29	100.00
Invalid/blank votes	0	0.00
Total votes	29	100.00
Registered voters/turnout	102	28.43

=== Polling stations in Belgrade and Sojevo ===
Serbia (Note: Sojevo, or Sojevë is a village near the Camp Bondsteel military base in Kosovo, where Ukrainian troops are located. Since Ukraine does not recognise Kosovo, the result of the vote has been accounted to Serbia.)
Party	Votes	%
Party of Regions	81	41.97
Ukrainian Democratic Alliance for Reform	53	27.46
Batkivshchyna	15	7.77
Svoboda	14	7.25
Communist Party of Ukraine	9	4.66
Socialist Party of Ukraine	3	1.55
Party of Greens of Ukraine	3	1.55
Our Ukraine	3	1.55
Russian Bloc	2	1.04
Green Planet	1	0.52
People's Labor Union of Ukraine	1	0.52
Liberal Party of Ukraine	1	0.52
Party of Pensioners of Ukraine	1	0.52
Ukraine – Forward!	1	0.52
Greens	1	0.52
Ukrainian National Assembly	1	0.52
Ukraine of the Future	1	0.52
Hromada	1	0.52
New Politics	1	0.52
Others	0	0.00
Total	193	100.00
Valid votes	193	100.00
Invalid/blank votes	0	0.00
Total votes	193	100.00
Registered voters/turnout	434	44.47

=== Polling station in Singapore ===
Singapore, Brunei and Indonesia
Party	Votes	%
Ukrainian Democratic Alliance for Reform	15	27.78
Batkivshchyna	14	25.93
Party of Regions	13	24.07
Svoboda	5	9.26
Green Planet	1	1.85
Ukraine of the Future	1	1.85
People's Labor Union of Ukraine	1	1.85
Party of Greens of Ukraine	1	1.85
Native Homeland	1	1.85
Communist Party of Ukraine	1	1.85
Ukraine – Forward!	1	1.85
Others	0	0.00
Total	54	100.00
Valid votes	54	100.00
Invalid/blank votes	0	0.00
Total votes	54	100.00
Registered voters/turnout	160	33.75

=== Polling stations in Bratislava and Prešov ===
Slovakia
Party	Votes	%
Party of Regions	59	36.88
Svoboda	38	23.75
Ukrainian Democratic Alliance for Reform	35	21.88
Batkivshchyna	16	10.00
Communist Party of Ukraine	5	3.12
Our Ukraine	4	2.50
Party of Pensioners of Ukraine	1	0.62
Ukraine – Forward!	1	0.62
Russian Bloc	1	0.62
Others	0	0.00
Total	160	100.00
Valid votes	160	99.38
Invalid/blank votes	1	0.62
Total votes	161	100.00
Registered voters/turnout	2,294	7.02

=== Polling station in Ljubljana ===
Slovenia
Party	Votes	%
Ukrainian Democratic Alliance for Reform	14	37.84
Party of Regions	9	24.32
Svoboda	7	18.92
Batkivshchyna	4	10.81
Our Ukraine	1	2.70
Hromada	1	2.70
Ukraine – Forward!	1	2.70
Others	0	0.00
Total	37	100.00
Valid votes	37	97.37
Invalid/blank votes	1	2.63
Total votes	38	100.00
Registered voters/turnout	211	18.01

=== Polling stations in Washington D.C., New York, San Francisco and Chicago ===
United States and Antigua and Barbuda
Party	Votes	%
Svoboda	736	58.27
Ukrainian Democratic Alliance for Reform	232	18.37
Batkivshchyna	193	15.28
Party of Regions	52	4.12
Communist Party of Ukraine	15	1.19
Our Ukraine	15	1.19
Party of Pensioners of Ukraine	5	0.40
Green Planet	5	0.40
Ukraine – Forward!	3	0.24
Greens	2	0.16
Ukrainian National Assembly	1	0.08
Hromada	1	0.08
Ukraine of the Future	1	0.08
Socialist Party of Ukraine	1	0.08
Russian Bloc	1	0.08
Others	0	0.00
Total	1,263	100.00
Valid votes	1,263	99.53
Invalid/blank votes	6	0.47
Total votes	1,269	100.00
Registered voters/turnout	3,475	36.52

=== Polling station in Bangkok ===
Thailand, Myanmar and Laos
Party	Votes	%
Svoboda	8	28.57
Batkivshchyna	8	28.57
Party of Regions	6	21.43
Ukrainian Democratic Alliance for Reform	5	17.86
Our Ukraine	1	3.57
Others	0	0.00
Total	28	100.00
Valid votes	28	96.55
Invalid/blank votes	1	3.45
Total votes	29	100.00
Registered voters/turnout	90	32.22

=== Polling station in Tunis ===
Tunisia
Party	Votes	%
Svoboda	8	15.69
Ukrainian Democratic Alliance for Reform	9	17.65
Batkivshchyna	11	21.57
Party of Regions	18	35.29
Ukraine – Forward!	2	3.92
Socialist Party of Ukraine	1	1.96
Communist Party of Ukraine	1	1.96
Greens	1	1.96
Others	0	0.00
Total	51	100.00
Valid votes	51	100.00
Invalid/blank votes	0	0.00
Total votes	51	100.00
Registered voters/turnout	231	22.08

=== Polling stations in Ankara and Istanbul ===
Turkey
Party	Votes	%
Party of Regions	34	36.96
Ukrainian Democratic Alliance for Reform	30	32.61
Svoboda	10	10.87
Batkivshchyna	8	8.70
Communist Party of Ukraine	4	4.35
Party of Greens of Ukraine	3	3.26
Ukraine of the Future	1	1.09
Ukraine – Forward!	1	1.09
Greens	1	1.09
Others	0	0.00
Total	92	100.00
Valid votes	92	100.00
Invalid/blank votes	0	0.00
Total votes	92	100.00
Registered voters/turnout	248	37.10

=== Polling station in Ashgabat ===
Turkmenistan and Afghanistan
Party	Votes	%
Party of Regions	259	62.11
Ukrainian Democratic Alliance for Reform	52	12.47
Svoboda	38	9.11
Batkivshchyna	34	8.15
Communist Party of Ukraine	10	2.40
Party of Pensioners of Ukraine	5	1.20
Our Ukraine	5	1.20
Ukraine – Forward!	4	0.96
Green Planet	2	0.48
People's Labor Union of Ukraine	2	0.48
Ukraine of the Future	1	0.24
Russian Bloc	1	0.24
Party of Greens of Ukraine	1	0.24
Greens	1	0.24
Socialist Party of Ukraine	1	0.24
Native Homeland	1	0.24
Others	0	0.00
Total	417	100.00
Valid votes	417	98.35
Invalid/blank votes	7	1.65
Total votes	424	100.00
Registered voters/turnout	652	65.03

=== Polling stations in Budapest and Nyíregyháza ===
Hungary
Party	Votes	%
Ukrainian Democratic Alliance for Reform	97	34.28
Party of Regions	71	25.09
Batkivshchyna	48	16.96
Svoboda	31	10.95
Communist Party of Ukraine	10	3.53
Our Ukraine	6	2.12
Russian Bloc	4	1.41
Greens	4	1.41
Ukraine – Forward!	3	1.06
Ukrainian National Assembly	2	0.71
Party of Pensioners of Ukraine	2	0.71
Native Homeland	1	0.35
Green Planet	1	0.35
Ukraine of the Future	1	0.35
Socialist Party of Ukraine	1	0.35
Party of Greens of Ukraine	1	0.35
Others	0	0.00
Total	283	100.00
Valid votes	283	99.30
Invalid/blank votes	2	0.70
Total votes	285	100.00
Registered voters/turnout	5,312	5.37

=== Polling station in Tashkent ===
Uzbekistan and Tajikistan
Party	Votes	%
Party of Regions	45	26.63
Ukrainian Democratic Alliance for Reform	42	24.85
Communist Party of Ukraine	19	11.24
Socialist Party of Ukraine	11	6.51
Russian Bloc	8	4.73
Our Ukraine	7	4.14
Batkivshchyna	7	4.14
Ukraine – Forward!	6	3.55
Party of Pensioners of Ukraine	5	2.96
Svoboda	4	2.37
Liberal Party of Ukraine	2	1.18
People's Labor Union of Ukraine	2	1.18
Party of Greens of Ukraine	2	1.18
Greens	2	1.18
Radical Party of Oleh Liashko	2	1.18
Green Planet	2	1.18
Ukraine of the Future	1	0.59
New Politics	1	0.59
Native Homeland	1	0.59
Others	0	0.00
Total	169	100.00
Valid votes	169	99.41
Invalid/blank votes	1	0.59
Total votes	170	100.00
Registered voters/turnout	1,285	13.23

=== Polling station in Helsinki ===
Finland
Party	Votes	%
Batkivshchyna	37	32.74
Ukrainian Democratic Alliance for Reform	30	26.55
Svoboda	16	14.16
Party of Regions	12	10.62
Communist Party of Ukraine	7	6.19
Russian Bloc	3	2.65
Green Planet	2	1.77
Our Ukraine	1	0.88
Radical Party of Oleh Liashko	1	0.88
Party of Greens of Ukraine	1	0.88
Greens	1	0.88
Socialist Party of Ukraine	1	0.88
Ukraine – Forward!	1	0.88
Others	0	0.00
Total	113	100.00
Valid votes	113	99.12
Invalid/blank votes	1	0.88
Total votes	114	100.00
Registered voters/turnout	1,258	9.06

=== Polling stations in Paris and Marseille ===
France and Monaco
Party	Votes	%
Batkivshchyna	71	28.40
Ukrainian Democratic Alliance for Reform	70	28.00
Svoboda	61	24.40
Party of Regions	23	9.20
Our Ukraine	9	3.60
Communist Party of Ukraine	6	2.40
Party of Pensioners of Ukraine	2	0.80
Russian Bloc	2	0.80
Ukraine – Forward!	1	0.40
Greens	1	0.40
New Politics	1	0.40
Liberal Party of Ukraine	1	0.40
Party of Greens of Ukraine	1	0.40
Socialist Party of Ukraine	1	0.40
Others	0	0.00
Total	250	100.00
Valid votes	250	100.00
Invalid/blank votes	0	0.00
Total votes	250	100.00
Registered voters/turnout	1,836	13.62

=== Polling station in Zagreb ===
Croatia and Bosnia and Herzegovina
Party	Votes	%
Ukrainian Democratic Alliance for Reform	15	30.61
Party of Regions	14	28.57
Batkivshchyna	9	18.37
Svoboda	5	10.20
Communist Party of Ukraine	3	6.12
Russian Bloc	1	2.04
Our Ukraine	1	2.04
Ukraine – Forward!	1	2.04
Others	0	0.00
Total	49	100.00
Valid votes	49	100.00
Invalid/blank votes	0	0.00
Total votes	49	100.00
Registered voters/turnout	197	24.87

=== Polling stations in Prague and Brno ===
Czech Republic
Party	Votes	%
Svoboda	355	32.60
Ukrainian Democratic Alliance for Reform	345	31.68
Batkivshchyna	256	23.51
Party of Regions	57	5.23
Communist Party of Ukraine	31	2.85
Our Ukraine	19	1.74
Ukraine of the Future	4	0.37
Party of Pensioners of Ukraine	4	0.37
Russian Bloc	3	0.28
Socialist Party of Ukraine	2	0.18
Native Homeland	2	0.18
Party of Greens of Ukraine	2	0.18
Radical Party of Oleh Liashko	2	0.18
Liberal Party of Ukraine	2	0.18
Green Planet	2	0.18
Ukraine – Forward!	2	0.18
New Politics	1	0.09
Others	0	0.00
Total	1,089	100.00
Valid votes	1,089	99.54
Invalid/blank votes	5	0.46
Total votes	1,094	100.00
Registered voters/turnout	10,504	10.42

=== Polling station in Podgorica ===
Montenegro
Party	Votes	%
Party of Regions	17	51.52
Communist Party of Ukraine	3	9.09
Ukrainian Democratic Alliance for Reform	3	9.09
Batkivshchyna	3	9.09
Svoboda	2	6.06
Ukraine – Forward!	2	6.06
Our Ukraine	2	6.06
Green Planet	1	3.03
Others	0	0.00
Total	33	100.00
Valid votes	33	100.00
Invalid/blank votes	0	0.00
Total votes	33	100.00
Registered voters/turnout	112	29.46

=== Polling station in Bern ===
Switzerland and Liechtenstein
Party	Votes	%
Batkivshchyna	42	33.60
Ukrainian Democratic Alliance for Reform	30	24.00
Svoboda	23	18.40
Party of Regions	16	12.80
Our Ukraine	8	6.40
Communist Party of Ukraine	2	1.60
Liberal Party of Ukraine	1	0.80
Party of Greens of Ukraine	1	0.80
Greens	1	0.80
Ukraine – Forward!	1	0.80
Others	0	0.00
Total	125	100.00
Valid votes	125	100.00
Invalid/blank votes	0	0.00
Total votes	125	100.00
Registered voters/turnout	697	17.93

=== Polling station in Stockholm ===
Sweden
Party	Votes	%
Svoboda	42	38.89
Batkivshchyna	26	24.07
Ukrainian Democratic Alliance for Reform	24	22.22
Party of Regions	11	10.19
Socialist Party of Ukraine	2	1.85
Communist Party of Ukraine	1	0.93
Ukraine – Forward!	1	0.93
Hromada	1	0.93
Others	0	0.00
Total	108	100.00
Valid votes	108	99.08
Invalid/blank votes	1	0.92
Total votes	109	100.00
Registered voters/turnout	621	17.55

=== Polling station in Tokyo ===
Japan
Party	Votes	%
Batkivshchyna	24	33.33
Svoboda	16	22.22
Ukrainian Democratic Alliance for Reform	14	19.44
Party of Regions	10	13.89
Our Ukraine	3	4.17
Radical Party of Oleh Liashko	2	2.78
Native Homeland	1	1.39
Party of Greens of Ukraine	1	1.39
Communist Party of Ukraine	1	1.39
Others	0	0.00
Total	72	100.00
Valid votes	72	100.00
Invalid/blank votes	0	0.00
Total votes	72	100.00
Registered voters/turnout	428	16.82

=== Polling stations in Goma and Bunia ===
DR Congo (Note: Both polling stations are located in Goma and Bunia's military bases of the 18th Helicopter Detachment of the MONUSCO and does not cover the whole territory of DR Congo)
Party	Votes	%
Party of Regions	57	37.25
Ukrainian Democratic Alliance for Reform	32	20.92
Svoboda	26	16.99
Batkivshchyna	24	15.69
Communist Party of Ukraine	6	3.92
Party of Greens of Ukraine	2	1.31
Socialist Party of Ukraine	2	1.31
Ukraine of the Future	1	0.65
Our Ukraine	1	0.65
Green Planet	1	0.65
Greens	1	0.65
Others	0	0.00
Total	153	100.00
Valid votes	153	99.35
Invalid/blank votes	1	0.65
Total votes	154	100.00
Registered voters/turnout	165	93.33

=== Polling station in Monrovia ===
Liberia (Note: Polling station is located on the military bases of the 56th Helicopter Detachment of the UNMIL and does not cover the whole territory of Liberia)
Party	Votes	%
Party of Regions	137	47.24
Ukrainian Democratic Alliance for Reform	65	22.41
Batkivshchyna	48	16.55
Svoboda	13	4.48
Communist Party of Ukraine	6	2.07
Ukraine – Forward!	6	2.07
Greens	4	1.38
Party of Pensioners of Ukraine	2	0.69
Ukraine of the Future	1	0.34
Green Planet	1	0.34
Our Ukraine	1	0.34
Radical Party of Oleh Liashko	1	0.34
Party of Greens of Ukraine	1	0.34
Ukrainian National Assembly	1	0.34
Socialist Party of Ukraine	1	0.34
People's Labor Union of Ukraine	1	0.34
Native Homeland	1	0.34
Others	0	0.00
Total	290	100.00
Valid votes	290	99.66
Invalid/blank votes	1	0.34
Total votes	291	100.00
Registered voters/turnout	293	99.32

=== Polling station in Dakar ===
Senegal
Party	Votes	%
Party of Regions	5	27.78
Greens	4	22.22
Batkivshchyna	3	16.67
Svoboda	2	11.11
Ukrainian Democratic Alliance for Reform	2	11.11
Party of Greens of Ukraine	1	5.56
Ukraine – Forward!	1	5.56
Others	0	0.00
Total	18	100.00
Valid votes	18	100.00
Invalid/blank votes	0	0.00
Total votes	18	100.00
Registered voters/turnout	51	35.29
