= Verkhovna Rada of Crimea =

Former parliament of Crimea in Ukraine

Coordinates: 44°57′6″N 34°5′49″E

Verkhovna Rada of Crimea: Верховна Рада Криму; Верховный Совет Крыма; Qırım Muhtar Cumhuriyetiniñ Yuqarı Radası; Къырым Мухтар Джумхуриетининъ Йукъары Радасы

Type
- Type: Unicameral

History
- Founded: 18 October 1921; 104 years ago (historical) 6 May 1992; 34 years ago (modern)
- Disbanded: 15 March 2014; 12 years ago
- Succeeded by: State Council of Crimea

Leadership
- Chairman: Vladimir Konstantinov (last)

Structure
- Seats: 100
- Political groups: Government (80): Party of Regions (80); Opposition (20): Communist Party of Ukraine (5); Qurultai-Rukh (5); Soyuz (5); Russian Unity (3); Strong Ukraine (2)

Elections
- Voting system: Mixed-member proportional representation
- First election: 21 July 1938 (historical) 27 March 1994 (modern)
- Last election: 31 October 2010

Meeting place
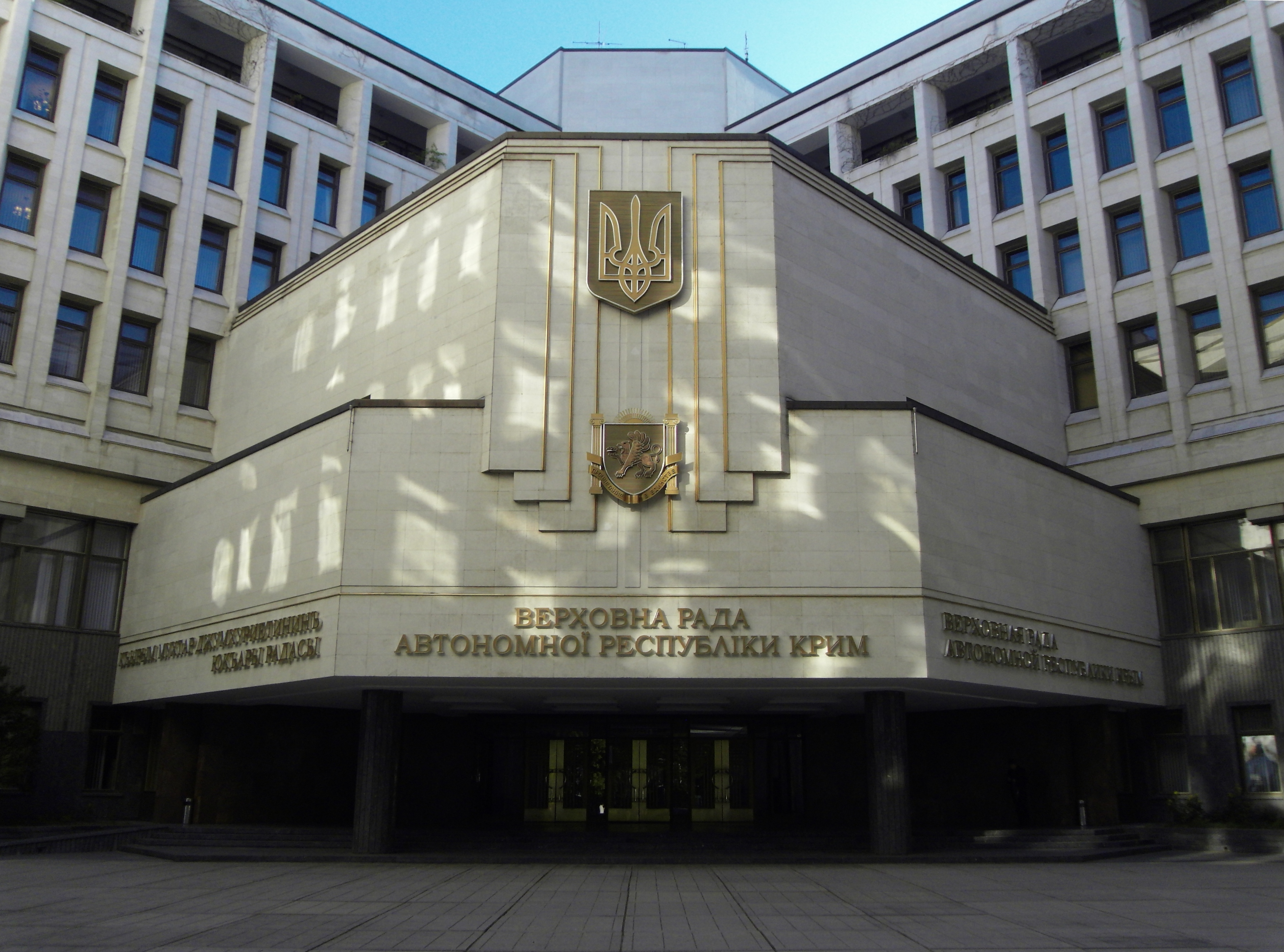
- Building of the Supreme Council of Crimea, Simferopol

Website
- rada.crimea.ua (Archived)

Constitution
- Constitution of the Autonomous Republic of Crimea

Verkhovna Rada of Crimea or the Supreme Council of Crimea, officially the Supreme Council of the Autonomous Republic of Crimea, (Note: Ukrainian: Верховна Рада Автономної Республіки Крим, romanized: Verkhovna Rada Avtonomnoï Respubliky Krym; Russian: Верховный Совет Автономной Республики Крым, romanized: Verkhovny Sovet Avtonomnoy Respubliki Krym; Crimean Tatar: Qırım Muhtar Cumhuriyetiniñ Yuqarı Radası/Къырым Мухтар Джумхуриетининъ Йукъары Радасы) was the Ukrainian legislative body for the Autonomous Republic of Crimea before the annexation of Crimea by Russia in 2014.

The last election of parliament took place on 31 October 2010 (see 2010 Crimean parliamentary election) and was won by the Party of Regions and the Communist Party of Ukraine.

On 27 February 2014, unidentified armed men took over the parliament and hoisted the flag of Russia over it. On 15 March 2014 the Verkhovna Rada of Ukraine officially dissolved the parliament. On 17 March 2014, one day before the Russian annexation of Crimea, the State Council of Crimea was established in place of the Verkhovna Rada of Crimea.

== History ==
The first session of the first convocation of the Supreme Soviet of the Crimean Autonomous Soviet Socialist Republic as part of the Russian SFSR took place on 21 July 1938. On 25 June 1946, the Crimean ASSR was abolished and the Crimean region was established as part of the Russian SFSR (in April 1954 it was transferred to the Ukrainian SSR).

On 22 March 1991, after the re-establishment of the Crimean ASSR, the Crimean Regional Council of People's Deputies was transformed into the Supreme Soviet of the Crimean ASSR in accordance with the law of the Ukrainian SSR of 12 February 1991 "On the restoration of the Crimean Autonomous Soviet Socialist Republic". After the collapse of the USSR in December 1991, the autonomy became part of independent Ukraine. On 26 February 1992, by the decision of the Supreme Council of Autonomy, the Crimean ASSR was renamed the Republic of Crimea, and on 6 May of the same year, the Crimean Constitution was adopted, which confirmed this name, the parliament of the republic became officially called the Supreme Council of Crimea or the Verkhovna Rada of Crimea.

On 21 September 1994, the Supreme Council of Ukraine renamed the Crimean autonomy the Autonomous Republic of Crimea, and the Supreme Council of Crimea became known as the Supreme Council of the Autonomous Republic of Crimea.

=== Since 2014 ===
Following the 2014 Russian annexation of Crimea, the supreme council was proclaimed to have been unilaterally disbanded by Russian occupation officials and replaced by the State Council of Crimea, although the Council continues de jure as the city's parliament in Ukraine.

== Last election ==
Party	Votes	%	Seats		
Party	Votes	%	Party-list	Constituency	Total
Party of Regions	357,030	50.44	32	48	80
Communist Party of Ukraine	54,172	7.65	5	0	5
Qurultai-Rukh	51,253	7.24	5	0	5
Soyuz	38,514	5.44	3	2	5
Russian Unity	29,343	4.15	3	0	3
Strong Ukraine	26,515	3.75	2	0	2
Batkivshchyna	19,589	2.77	0	0	0
Progressive Socialist Party of Ukraine	12,614	1.78	0	0	0
Party of Pensioners of Ukraine	11,133	1.57	0	0	0
Front for Change	8,281	1.17	0	0	0
Ukrainian Peasant Democratic Party	7,268	1.03	0	0	0
People's Party	4,563	0.64	0	0	0
Socialist Party of Ukraine	2,909	0.41	0	0	0
Party of Greens of Ukraine	2,493	0.35	0	0	0
All-Ukrainian Party "Children of War"	2,030	0.29	0	0	0
Justice Party	1,822	0.26	0	0	0
Greens	1,699	0.24	0	0	0
Peasant Party of Ukraine	1,396	0.20	0	0	0
Motherland	1,395	0.20	0	0	0
Svoboda	1,361	0.19	0	0	0
New Politics	1,291	0.18	0	0	0
United Centre	1,278	0.18	0	0	0
Ukrainian Social Democratic Party	1,240	0.18	0	0	0
Union of Left Forces	1,177	0.17	0	0	0
Ukrainian People's Party	1,114	0.16	0	0	0
Agrarian Party of Ukraine	980	0.14	0	0	0
People's Power Party	934	0.13	0	0	0
New Generation Party	904	0.13	0	0	0
Socialist Ukraine	878	0.12	0	0	0
Social Democratic Party of Ukraine (united)	803	0.11	0	0	0
People's Labor Union of Ukraine	745	0.11	0	0	0
Ukrainian Republican Party "Sobor"	743	0.10	0	0	0
Congress of Ukrainian Nationalists	702	0.10	0	0	0
Democratic Party of Ukraine	625	0.09	0	0	0
Liberal Democratic Party of Ukraine	624	0.09	0	0	0
Hromada	452	0.06	0	0	0
European Party of Ukraine	432	0.06	0	0	0
Against all	57,552	8.13	–	–	–
Total	707,854	100.00	50	50	100
Valid votes	707,854	97.01			
Invalid/blank votes	21,794	2.99			
Total votes	729,648	100.00			
Registered voters/turnout	1,522,000	47.94			
Source: Government of Crimea

	Party (Shading indicates majority caucus)							Total	Vacant
	Party of Regions	Qurultai-Rukh	Soyuz	Russian Unity	Communists	Strong Ukraine	Non-affiliated	Total	Vacant
End of previous convocation	44	8	10	DNP	9	DNP	DNP	100	0
Begin	80	5	5	3	5	2	-	100	0
February 20, 2013	80	4	4	3	3	-	3	100	3
November 27, 2013	82	4	4	3	3	-	3	100	1
Latest voting share	82.0%	4.0%	4.0%	3.0%	3.0%	N/A	3.0%		

== Chairpersons ==
=== Regional executive committee ===
- Mikhail Kuzmenko (1954–1956)
- Ivan Filippov (1956–1959)
- Vladimir Druzhynin (1959–1963)
- Vladimir Druzhynin (1963–1964, industrial)
- Nikolai Moiseev (1963–1964, agrarian)
- Vladimir Druzhynin (1964–1965)
- Trofim Chemodurov (1966–1979)
- Yuri Bakhtin (1979–1985)
- Alexander Roshchupkin (1985–1989)
- Vitaly Kurashik (1989–1991)

=== Regional council ===
- Mykola Bahrov (1991–1994)
- Sergei Tsekov (1994–1995)
- Yevhen Suprunyuk (1995–1996)
- Vasily Kiselev (1996–1997)
- Anatoliy Hrytsenko (1997–1998)
- Leonid Hrach (1998–2002)
- Boris Deich (2002–2006)
- Anatoliy Hrytsenko (2006–2010)
- Vladimir Konstantinov (2010–2014)

== See also ==
- State Council of Crimea
