= 2010 Crimean parliamentary election =

- 31 October 2010
- All 100 seats in the Verkhovna Rada of Crimea; 51 seats needed for a majority
Party	Vote %	Seats	+/–
Party of Regions	50.44	80	+36
KPU	7.65	5	−4
Qurultai-Rukh	7.24	5	−3
Soyuz	5.44	5	−5
Russian Unity	4.15	3	New
Strong Ukraine	3.75	2	New
This lists parties that won seats. See the complete results below.
Chairman of the Council before	Chairman of the Council after
Anatoliy Hrytsenko; Party of Regions	Vladimir Konstantinov; Party of Regions

The 2010 Crimean parliamentary election was held on 31 October 2010 as a part of the general 2010 Ukrainian local elections. Unlike the previous election to the Verkhovna Rada of Crimea, they were conducted on the mixed-member proportional representation system. In order to gain representation in the Parliament of the Autonomous Republic of Crimea, a party or bloc had to garner at least 3 percent of the total vote. The Party of Regions won the elections with an overwhelming majority. This was the last parliamentary election in Crimea before it was annexed by Russia.

== Background ==
Prior to 2009 amendments to the Crimean Constitution, the parliament's term was limited to four years. It has since been increased to five after Ukrainian President Viktor Yushchenko signed the amendments into law in April 2009.

New elections where set for October 31, 2010 by the Supreme Council on August 4, 2010. In June 2010 the parliament had failed to fix the election date on October 31. The resolution was voted against by a number of coalition factions, including the ruling For Yanukovych! electoral bloc (that included the Party of Regions). Early July 2010, the Verkhovna Rada (Ukraine's national parliament) supported by the Party of Regions’ initiative, announced local elections on the last day of October 2010.

== Results ==
Party	Votes	%	Seats		
Party	Votes	%	Party-list	Constituency	Total
Party of Regions	357,030	50.44	32	48	80
Communist Party of Ukraine	54,172	7.65	5	0	5
Qurultai-Rukh	51,253	7.24	5	0	5
Soyuz	38,514	5.44	3	2	5
Russian Unity	29,343	4.15	3	0	3
Strong Ukraine	26,515	3.75	2	0	2
Batkivshchyna	19,589	2.77	0	0	0
Progressive Socialist Party of Ukraine	12,614	1.78	0	0	0
Party of Pensioners of Ukraine	11,133	1.57	0	0	0
Front for Change	8,281	1.17	0	0	0
Ukrainian Peasant Democratic Party	7,268	1.03	0	0	0
People's Party	4,563	0.64	0	0	0
Socialist Party of Ukraine	2,909	0.41	0	0	0
Party of Greens of Ukraine	2,493	0.35	0	0	0
All-Ukrainian Party "Children of War"	2,030	0.29	0	0	0
Justice Party	1,822	0.26	0	0	0
Greens	1,699	0.24	0	0	0
Peasant Party of Ukraine	1,396	0.20	0	0	0
Motherland	1,395	0.20	0	0	0
Svoboda	1,361	0.19	0	0	0
New Politics	1,291	0.18	0	0	0
United Centre	1,278	0.18	0	0	0
Ukrainian Social Democratic Party	1,240	0.18	0	0	0
Union of Left Forces	1,177	0.17	0	0	0
Ukrainian People's Party	1,114	0.16	0	0	0
Agrarian Party of Ukraine	980	0.14	0	0	0
People's Power Party	934	0.13	0	0	0
New Generation Party	904	0.13	0	0	0
Socialist Ukraine	878	0.12	0	0	0
Social Democratic Party of Ukraine (united)	803	0.11	0	0	0
People's Labor Union of Ukraine	745	0.11	0	0	0
Ukrainian Republican Party "Sobor"	743	0.10	0	0	0
Congress of Ukrainian Nationalists	702	0.10	0	0	0
Democratic Party of Ukraine	625	0.09	0	0	0
Liberal Democratic Party of Ukraine	624	0.09	0	0	0
Hromada	452	0.06	0	0	0
European Party of Ukraine	432	0.06	0	0	0
Against all	57,552	8.13	–	–	–
Total	707,854	100.00	50	50	100
Valid votes	707,854	97.01			
Invalid/blank votes	21,794	2.99			
Total votes	729,648	100.00			
Registered voters/turnout	1,522,000	47.94			
Source: Government of Crimea
