= Russian Bloc (party) =

Banned political party in Ukraine

Russian Bloc Руський блок Русский блок
- Leader: Gennady Basov
- Founded: March 2001
- Banned: 17 June 2014
- Ideology: Russification; Pan-Slavism; Federation with Russia

Website
- rusblok.net (defunct)

Russian Bloc (Ukrainian: Руський блок, romanized: Ruskyi blok; Russian: Русский блок, romanized: Russky blok) is a currently (since 13 May 2014) banned political party in Ukraine that was registered in March 2001.

The party associates itself with the Russian Federation and employs the Russian tricolor. It promotes the idea of a united, Pan-East-Slavic state. The former name of the party is the Party For One Rus' (Ukrainian: За Русь єдину, Russian: За Русь единую).

== History ==
The history of the party began with the creation in June 1999 of the "Russian Movement of Ukraine". It was formally registered as a political party in March 2001 under the name "For One Rus".

During the 2002 Ukrainian parliamentary election the party (still called "For One Rus'") was part of the Russian Bloc that got 0.73% of the votes and no seats. It did not participate in National elections until 2012. In the Verkhovna Rada of Crimea the party was represented after the 2006 Crimean parliamentary election as it is part of the Crimean political alliance "For Yanukovych!" with the Party of Regions. In the 2010 Crimean parliamentary election the Party of Regions and the Russian Bloc run separately. During this election the party won representatives in municipalities and did particularly well in Sevastopol. In the 2012 Ukrainian parliamentary election the party won 0.31% of the national votes and no constituencies (it had competed in 10 constituencies) and thus failed to win parliamentary representation. The parties best results were in constituency 233 (in Sevastopol) with 27.80%, constituency 223 (in Kyiv) with 8.22% and in constituency 43 (in Donetsk) with 4.23% of the votes.

=== Banning ===
The Ministry of Justice of Ukraine filed a lawsuit at the District Administrative Court in Kyiv for the ban of activities of the party (and also for a ban on the party Russian Unity) on 23 April 2014. On 20 March 2014 in Odesa local party leader Valery Kaurov was arrested on suspicion of separatism during the 2014 pro-Russian conflict in Ukraine.

On 13 May 2014 the District Administrative Court in Kyiv banned the party "in connection with calls to overthrow the constitutional order and the violation of the territorial integrity of Ukraine". The party appealed the sentence, but on 17 June 2014 the Kyiv Court of Appeals confirmed the decision and terminated the party.
