= Qurultai-Rukh =

Political party in Crimea

Qurultai-Rukh Курултай-Рух
- Leader: Mustafa Dzhemilev (Note: Leader of the Mejlis of the Crimean Tatar People.)
- Secretary: Remzi İlyasov
- Founded: 2006
- Ideology: Pro-Europeanism; Crimean Tatar rights
- National affiliation: People's Movement of Ukraine

The Qurultai-Rukh (Ukrainian: Курултай-Рух) is a regional organization of the People's Movement of Ukraine and a regional council's faction that consists of members from the Qurultay of the Crimean Tatar People in the Supreme Council of Crimea. The association of Crimean Tatars with the People's Movement of Ukraine started back in 1998. The faction supported the signing of the Ukrainian association with the European Union.

As a faction it was created after the 2006 Crimean parliamentary election and received eight seats in the Supreme Council of Crimea.

It was once again created as a faction after the 2010 Crimean parliamentary election and received five seats in the Crimean Council.
