= Bloc of the Party of Pensioners of Ukraine =

Ukrainian political bloc

The Bloc of the Party of Pensioners of Ukraine (Ukrainian: Блок партії пенсіонерів України) was a political alliance in Ukraine led by Feliks Petrosyan.

The bloc had been organized for participation in the 2007 parliamentary election. At the 2007 parliamentary elections the bloc failed to enter the parliament, winning 0.14% of the votes.

The Bloc consists of:

- Party of Pensioners of Ukraine
- Party of Protection of Pensioners of Ukraine
