= Russian Unity =

- Ukrainian name: Руська Єдність
- Russian name: Русское Единство
- Chairman: Sergey Aksyonov
- Founder: Maksym Kovalenko
- Founded: 28 October 2008
- Dissolved: 5 May 2014
- Merged into: United Russia
- Headquarters: 27th Building, Kirova Avenue, Simferopol, Republic of Crimea, Russia / Autonomous Republic of Crimea, Ukraine
- Youth wing: "Youth for Russian Unity" (Молодые за Русское Единство)
- Ideology: Russian nationalism Russian irredentism Russian conservatism Russophilia
- Political position: Right-wing
- Colours: Blue; White; Red

Website
- russ-edin.org (inactive) russkoe-edinstvo.com

The Russian Unity (Ukrainian: Руська Єдність, romanized: Ruska Yednist; Russian: Русское Единство, romanized: Russkoye Yedinstvo) was a political party in Crimea, registered in October 2008. A district court in Kyiv banned the party "from activity on the territory of Ukraine" on 30 April 2014. Party leader Sergey Aksyonov was instrumental in making possible the annexation of Crimea by the Russian Federation. The party was based in Crimea, which has a Russian-speaking majority. The party was dissolved on 5 May 2014.

Although the party took positions on a number of issues, the party's main focus was Russian language rights and promoting Ukrainian relations with Russia before the 2014 Crimean Crisis, in which it became supportive of secession from Ukraine to join Russia; after this occurred, it merged into the Russian political party United Russia.

== History ==
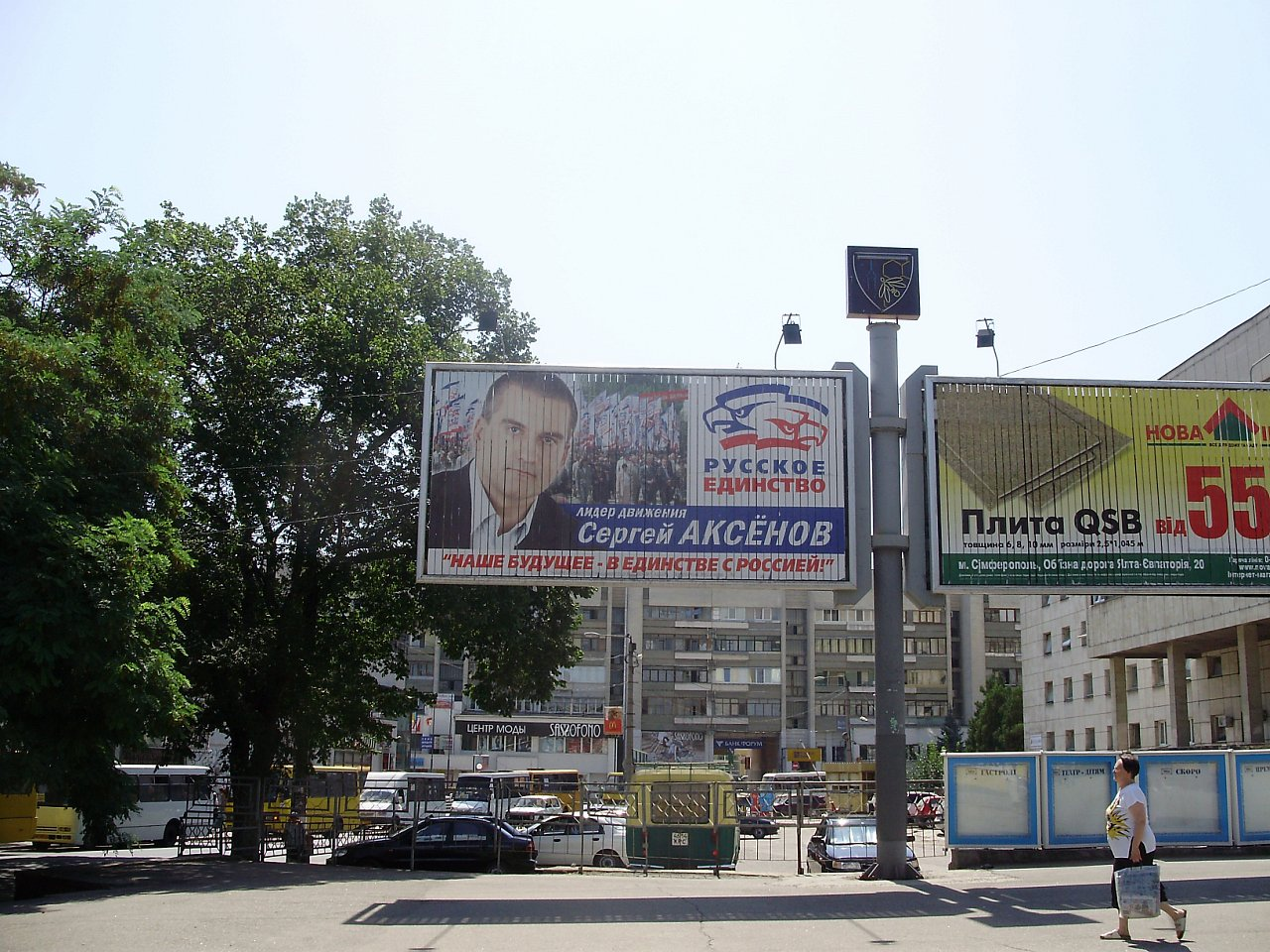
Big board of "Russian Unity" in Simferopol 2010

The party was founded in Simferopol under the original name Vanguard (Ukrainian: Авангард) and registered by the Ukrainian Ministry of Justice in October 2008. In August 2010 they were renamed Russian Unity. It won 3 seats (of the 100 in total) during the 2010 Crimean parliamentary election in the Supreme Council of Crimea.

In the 2012 Ukrainian parliamentary election the party competed in/for 4 constituencies (seats), all of them located in the Autonomous Republic of Crimea; but it won in none and thus missed parliamentary representation. The party's best result was in constituency 1 (located in Simferopol) with 9.12%. In constituency 2 (also located in Simferopol) it scored 4.12%, in constituency 6 (in Feodosiya) 4.11% and in constituency 10 (in Bakhchysarai) 2.28%.

In 2014 the party was involved in protests and the seizure of government buildings, including the Supreme Council of Crimea (the parliament of the Autonomous Republic of Crimea), during the 2014 Crimean crisis. Party leader Sergey Aksyonov was named Prime Minister of Crimea on 27 February 2014, and then called for a referendum on Crimea's autonomy. On 11 March Crimea adopted a declaration of independence and held on 17 March the 2014 Crimean status referendum that lead to the 21 March 2014 annexation of Crimea by the Russian Federation.

The Ministry of Justice of Ukraine filed a lawsuit at the District Administrative Court in Kyiv for the ban of activities of the party (and also for a ban on the party Russian Bloc) on 23 April 2014. On 30 April (2014) the Court banned the party "from activity on the territory of Ukraine". The Court stated that the signing of Aksenov of the treaty that formally sealed the annexation of Crimea by the Russian Federation was evidence of "encroachment on the territorial integrity of Ukraine".

In August 2014 the party signed a cooperation agreement with Latvian Russian Union, a Russian political party in Latvia, to "strengthen the unity of the Russian world."

The party was dissolved and merged into United Russia on 5 May 2014.

== Party leaders ==
- 2008–2010: Maksym Kovalenko
- 2010–2014: Sergey Aksyonov
