= Russian Bloc =

Former Ukrainian political alliance

The Russian Bloc (Ukrainian: Руський блок, Russian: Русский блок) was a former political alliance in Ukraine.

It consisted of:

- Rus'-Ukrainian Union
- Union Party
- For Russian Unity

At the 2002 Ukrainian parliamentary election, it won 0.73% of the popular vote and no seats.
