= People Bloc =

Ukrainian political party

The People Bloc (Ukrainian: "Народний блок", romanized: Narodnyi blok), formerly Party of Protection of Pensioners of Ukraine (Ukrainian: Партія Захисту Пенсіонерів України, romanized: Partiia Zakhystu Pensioneriv Ukrainy), is a political party in Ukraine registered in January 1998.

== History ==
Its first election was the Ukrainian 2006 parliamentary elections, the party failed as part of the electoral alliance "Power to the People" to gain any seats, winning 0.09% of the votes.

In the 30 September 2007 elections, the party failed again as part of the Bloc of the Party of Pensioners of Ukraine to win parliamentary representation.

The party renamed itself People Bloc in August 2009.

The party did not participate in the 2012, 2014, or 2019 Ukrainian parliamentary elections, rendering it electorally defunct.
