= Embassy of Ukraine, Belgrade =

Embassy of Ukraine in Belgrade

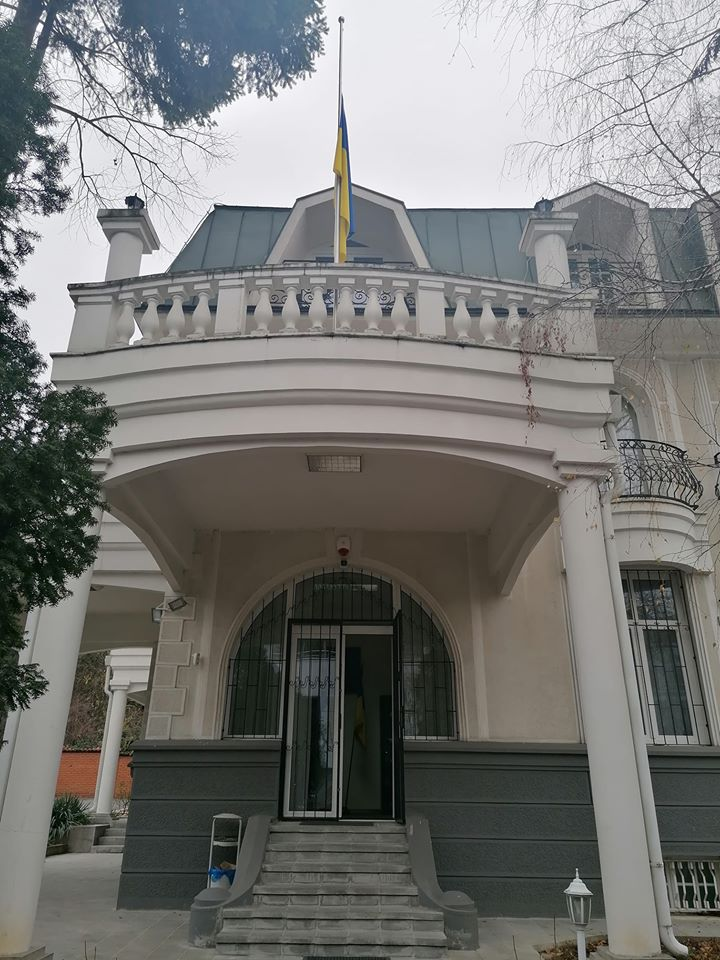
- Ukraianian Embassy
- Location: Belgrade, Serbia
- Address: Paje Adamova 4
- Coordinates: 44°46′23″N 20°27′41″E
- Ambassador: Volodymyr Tolkach
- Website: https://serbia.mfa.gov.ua/

The Embassy of Ukraine in Belgrade is a diplomatic mission of Ukraine in Serbia, located in the capital city Belgrade.

== Tasks ==
The main task of the Embassy of Ukraine in Belgrade is to represent the interests of Ukraine, promote the development of political, economic, cultural, scientific and other ties, as well as protect the rights and interests of citizens and legal entities of Ukraine located in Serbia.

The embassy promotes the development of interstate relations between Ukraine and Serbia at all levels to ensure the harmonious development of mutual relations and cooperation on issues of mutual interest. The embassy also performs consular functions.

In July 2020, the embassy responded to protests in Serbia on Ukrainian political matters and asking it not to interfere in Ukrainian internal affairs.

In Dec 2020, the embassy inquired into a seized shipment of Bronze Age, Byzantine period, Middle Ages, and artefacts of ancient Slavs and Celts crossing from Ukraine Serbia.

== History ==
The first Ambassador of Ukraine to Yugoslavia was Vadym Prymachenko, accredited in August 1996, who was previously General Counsel of Ukraine to Yugoslavia from 1993 until 1995 and Charge d'Affairs of Ukraine from 1995 until August 1996.

Diplomatic relations at the embassy level between Ukraine and the Federal Republic of Yugoslavia (FRY) were established on 15 April 1994. In 1995, the first Embassy of Ukraine in the Federal Republic of Yugoslavia was inaugurated. The embassy was located in Josip Slavenski Street. Subsequently, the embassy moved to new premises, Bulevar Oslobođenja 87. On 1 December 2009, the Government of Ukraine purchased a new building for the Embassy of Ukraine in Belgrade at Paje Adamova Street 4.

Up to 2018 Ukrainian-Serbian has 73 bilateral documents, including 4 interstate, 18 intergovernmental, 23 interministerial, 6 regional agreements, 10 memoranda and 12 protocols. Four signed agreements wait for ratification.

== Ambassadors ==
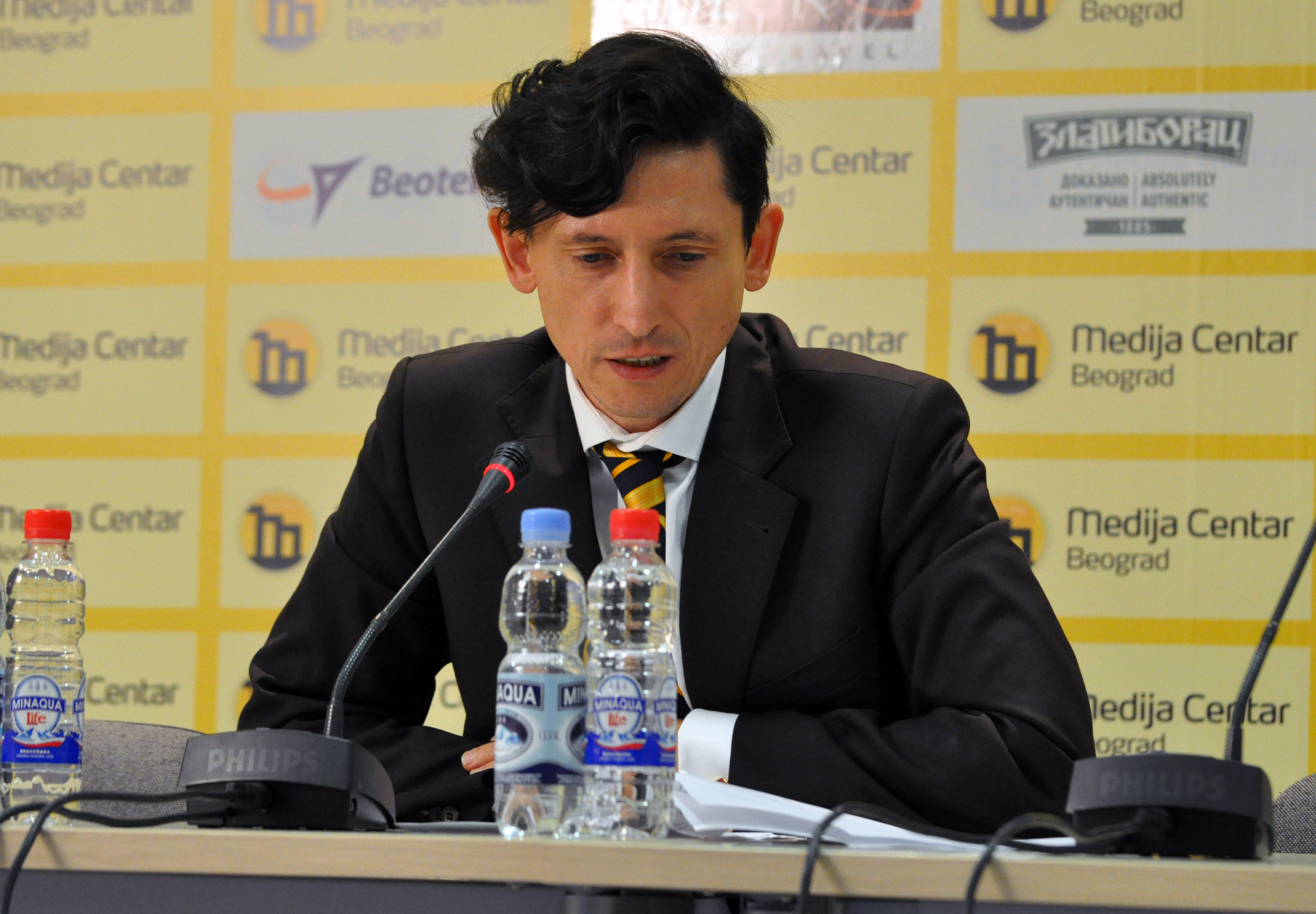
Oleksandr Aleksandrovych

- Vadym Prymachenko, 1993-1996
- Volodymyr Furkalo, 1998-2001
- Anatoliy Shostak, 2001-2003
- Ruslan Demchenko, 2003-2005
- Anatoliy Oliynik, 2005-2009
- Victor Nedopas, 2009-2015
- Oleksandr Aleksandrovych, 2015-2021
- Volodymyr Tolkach, from 13 December 2021

== Trade and economic cooperation between Ukraine and Serbia ==
According to the State Statistics Service of Ukraine data, bilateral trade in goods and services between Ukraine and the Republic of Serbia totalled 245 million USD.

· export of goods totalled 107,8 million USD;

· import of goods totalled 124,8 million USD;

· export of services totalled 9,9 million USD;

· import of services totaled 3,3 million USD;

According to the State Statistics Service of Ukraine, as of 31 December 2019, the volume of Serbian investments in the Ukrainian economy amounted to 33.2 million dollars. USD, which is 0.6 million less than the previous year.

According to the Ministry of Finance of the Republic of Serbia, about one thousand business entities cooperate with Ukraine.

According to the Agency for Registration of Business Entities, in 2020, 152 business entities were registered in Serbia, the majority owners of Ukraine or Ukrainian legal entities, most of which are engaged in retail trade and trade in auto parts, processing industry.

== See also ==
- Serbia-Ukraine relations
- List of diplomatic missions in Serbia
- Foreign relations of Serbia
- Foreign relations of Ukraine
