= Embassy of Ukraine, Athens =

Embassy of Ukraine to the Hellenic Republic

Embassy of Ukraine to the Hellenic Republic
- Embassy of Ukraine in Athens
- Location: Athens, Greece
- Address: 2, Stephanou Delta Str. – 152 37 Filothei.
- Coordinates: 38.0157°N 23.7843°E
- Ambassador: Sergii Shutenko since 2018
- Website: Official Website

Embassy of Ukraine in Greece (Ukrainian: Посольство України в Греції) is the diplomatic mission of Ukraine in Athens, Greece.

== History of the diplomatic relations ==
Greece recognized the independence of Ukraine on December 31, 1991. Diplomatic relations between two countries were established on January 26, 1992. In May 1992, Ukraine opened an Honorary Consulate in the Hellenic Republic. Embassy of Ukraine in Athens was opened in June 1993. From September 2018 to December 2024, Shutenko Sergii had been working as the Ambassador Extraordinary and Plenipotentiary of Ukraine to the Hellenic Republic. As of 2025, the head of the mission is Charge d'affaires a.i. of Ukraine Volodymyr Liashenko.

== See also ==
- Greece–Ukraine relations
- List of diplomatic missions in Greece
- Foreign relations of Greece
- Foreign relations of Ukraine
