= Embassy of Ukraine, Riga =

Embassy of Ukraine in the Republic of Latvia

Embassy of Ukraine in Latvia
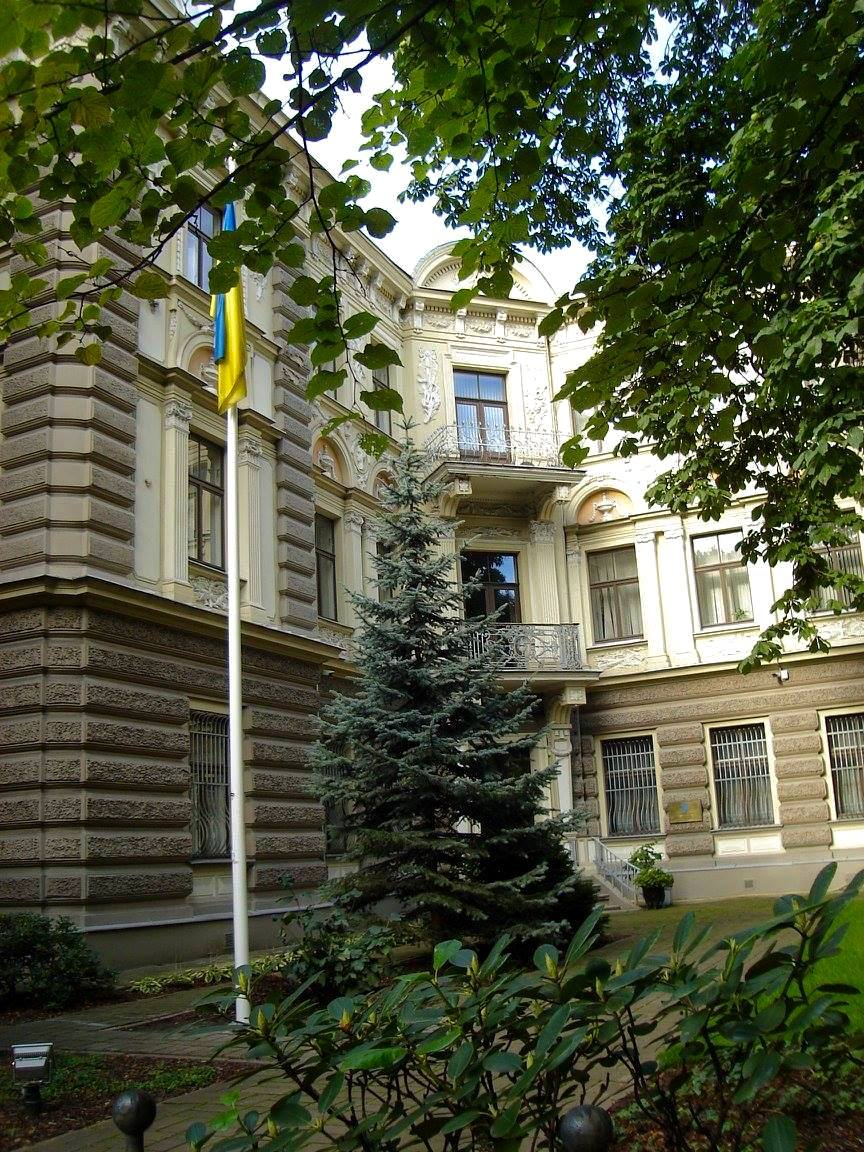
- Embassy of Ukraine in Riga
- Location: Riga, Latvia
- Address: LV-1010, 3 Kalpaka bulvaris
- Coordinates: 56°57′29″N 24°06′25″E
- Ambassador: Anatolii Kutsevol since 2022
- Website: latvia.mfa.gov.ua/en

Embassy of Ukraine in Latvia (Ukrainian: Посольство України в Латвії) is the diplomatic mission of Ukraine in Riga, Latvia. Since February 27, 2019, Ambassador Extraordinary and Plenipotentiary of Ukraine to the Republic of Latvia is Anatolii Kutsevol.

== History of the diplomatic relations ==
On August 26, 1991, Ukraine recognized independence of the Republic of Latvia. On December 4, 1991, Latvia recognized independence of Ukraine. Diplomatic relations between two countries were established on February 12, 1992. The Embassy of Ukraine has been functioning in Riga since 1993. The inauguration of the Embassy took place in 1995, in the presence of the President of Ukraine Leonid Kuchma and the President of Latvia Guntis Ulmanis.

== See also ==
- Latvia–Ukraine relations
- List of diplomatic missions in Latvia
- Foreign relations of Latvia
- Foreign relations of Ukraine
