= Embassy of Ukraine, The Hague =

Embassy of Ukraine in the Kingdom of the Netherlands

Embassy of Ukraine in the Kingdom of the Netherlands
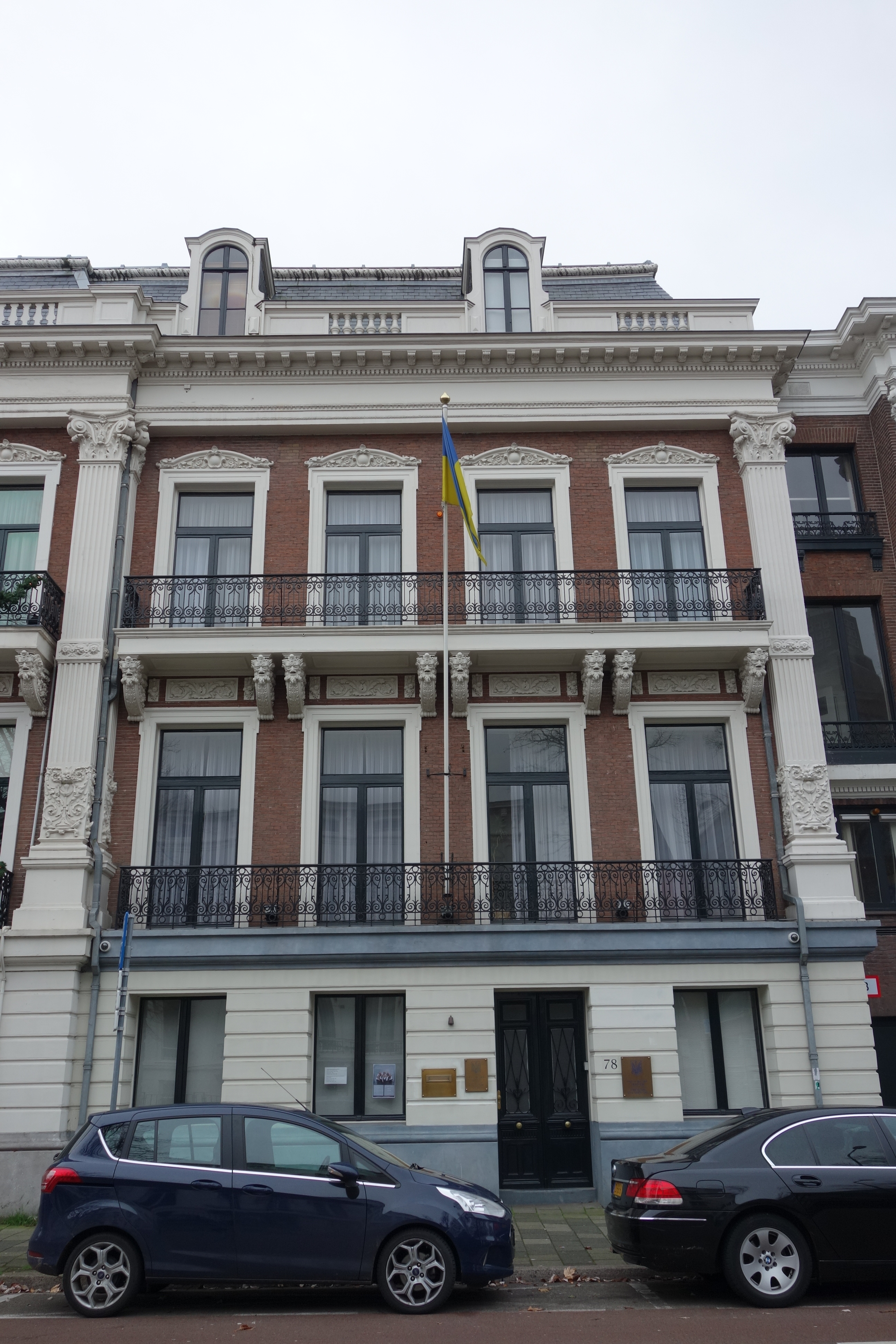
- Embassy of Ukraine in The Hague
- Location: The Hague, Netherlands
- Address: Zeestraat, 782518 AD
- Coordinates: 52°5′9″N 4°18′6″E
- Ambassador: Oleksandr Karasevych
- Website: Official Website

Embassy of Ukraine in the Netherlands (Ukrainian: Посольство України в Нідерландах) is the diplomatic mission of Ukraine in The Hague, Netherlands. Since 2023, Oleksandr Karasevych is the Ambassador Extraordinary and Plenipotentiary of Ukraine to the Kingdom of the Netherlands.

== History of the diplomatic relations ==
The Kingdom of the Netherlands recognized the independence of Ukraine on December 31, 1991. Diplomatic relations between two countries were established on April 1, 1992, by exchange of diplomatic notes. In mid 1993 the Embassy of Ukraine in the states of Benelux was opened in Brussels, covering also relations with the Netherlands. The full-fledged diplomatic mission of Ukraine to the Kingdom of the Netherlands began its activities in The Hague in May 2002.

== See also ==
- Netherlands–Ukraine relations
- List of diplomatic missions in Netherlands
- Foreign relations of Netherlands
- Foreign relations of Ukraine
