= Vladimir Druzhynin =

Soviet Ukrainian partisan and politician (1907–1976)

Vladimir Nikolaevich Druzhinin (Russian: Владимир Николаевич Дружинин; 25 December 1907, in Moscow – 20 August 1976, in Kyiv) was a Soviet state and party leader, a Hero of the Soviet Union during World War II and an active participant in the partisan movement in Ukraine through the Chernihiv Commissioner-Volyn. In February 1940, Druzhinin was elected second secretary of the Communist Party's Ternopil oblast committee, a post in which he served until July 1941. By a Decree of the Presidium of the Supreme Soviet of the USSR dated 4 January 1944, for organizing a guerrilla movement behind enemy lines against the Nazis, Druzhinin was named a Hero of the Soviet Union with the Order of Lenin and Gold Star number 2884.

== Biography ==
Druzhinin was born in Moscow into a working-class family on 24 December 1907. Orphaned with his seven brothers, he lived in orphanages in Moscow, Kursk and Putivl until 1923. At age fifteen Druzhinin entered the Komsomol (the All-Union Leninist Young Communist League), and in 1923 the Komsomol sent him to work in the Donbas mines.

In 1926, Druzhinin became a member of the CPSU (Communist Party of the Soviet Union). Between 1926 and 1930 he was the Division Head, District Secretary and a District Committee member of the LCYU (Local Communist Youth Union) in Hlukhiv, Ukraine. Druzhinin studied Marxist–Leninist teachings in 1930-31, after which his career continued to progress. From 1931 to 1938 he was Department Head, Deputy Secretary and Secretary of the Communist Party's first district committee of Ukraine for the Chernihiv oblast. Beginning in 1938, Druzhinin was Head of the Department of Organization and Instruction of the Communist Party's Chernihiv Oblast Committee in Ukraine.

== World War II ==
At the beginning of the World War II fighting on Germany's Eastern Front with the Soviet Union, Druzhinin was sent to the Red Army senior instructor political division, infantry division. In September 1941, the Kiev troops were surrounded. Druzhinin's staff destroyed documents and broke through the ring in the forest surrounding the Chernihiv and Sumy oblasts to connect to the Red Army. After 20 days, a group led by Druzhinin met a guerrilla group under the command of M. Popudrenko on 16 October, and he was appointed Commissioner of the Cavalry Group. On 28 July 1942, Druzhinin was appointed commander during a series of forest battles lasting from 27 July to 4 August in which the guerrilla partisans prevailed.

In early 1943, Ukrainian Partisan Movement Headquarters ordered a raid in Shchors district of Chernihiv oblast, with heavy fighting against the Nazis. On 5 March, the guerrilla troops were divided into two partisan groups. A. F. Fedorov was appointed Commander of the Chernihiv-Volyn guerrilla groups, and Druzhinin was appointed Commissioner. On 11 March 1943, the Chernihiv-Volyn partisan formations moving into the right bank of the Ubort River, where it remained until departing by train from Kovel in May. In July the partisans implemented an order from the Supreme Command of the Red Army, sabotaging railways and seizing manpower and equipment. After reforming the partisan formation in May 1944, Druzhinin was elected second secretary of the Ternopil oblast committee of the Communist Party (Bolshevik) of Ukraine.

== Post-war period ==
From February 1948 until 1951 Druzhinin was First Secretary of the Ternopil Oblast Committee of the Communist Party of Ukraine, and later served on its Central Committee. Beginning in 1954, he became the first secretary of the Kherson and Drohobych oblast committees. In 1966, Druzhinin was appointed Deputy and then First Deputy Minister of the Food Industry of the Ukrainian SSR. He spent the last years of his career as director of the Institute of Professional Training of Food Industry Experts of the USSR.

Druzhinin was deputy of the Supreme Soviet of the USSR III-VI and the second convocation of the Verkhovna Rada. From the 18th to the 22nd congresses of the Communist Party of Ukraine, he was a member of the Central Committee.

Druzhinin lived in Kiev, where he died on 20 August 1976. He is buried in the Baykove cemetery in Kiev.

== Honours and awards ==
- Hero of the Soviet Union
- Order of Lenin (three)
- Order of the October Revolution
- Order of the Red Banner
- Order of the Red Banner of Labour (two)
- Order of the Patriotic War (first class)
- Order of the Red Star
- Medal "Partisan of the Patriotic War" (first class)
- Medal "For the Victory over Germany in the Great Patriotic War 1941–1945"
