= People's Power Party (Ukraine) =

The People’s Power party (Ukrainian: Народна Партія Влади) is a former political party in Ukraine registered on September 1, 2004. The party merged into the (then) new party United Left and Peasants in December 2011.

The party never competed in a national election. The party’s aim was to develop democracy and a Ukraine without oligarchs. The last party leader was former transport minister in the second Tymoshenko Government Yosyp Vinsky.
