= Socialist Ukraine =

Socialist Ukraine Соціалістична Україна
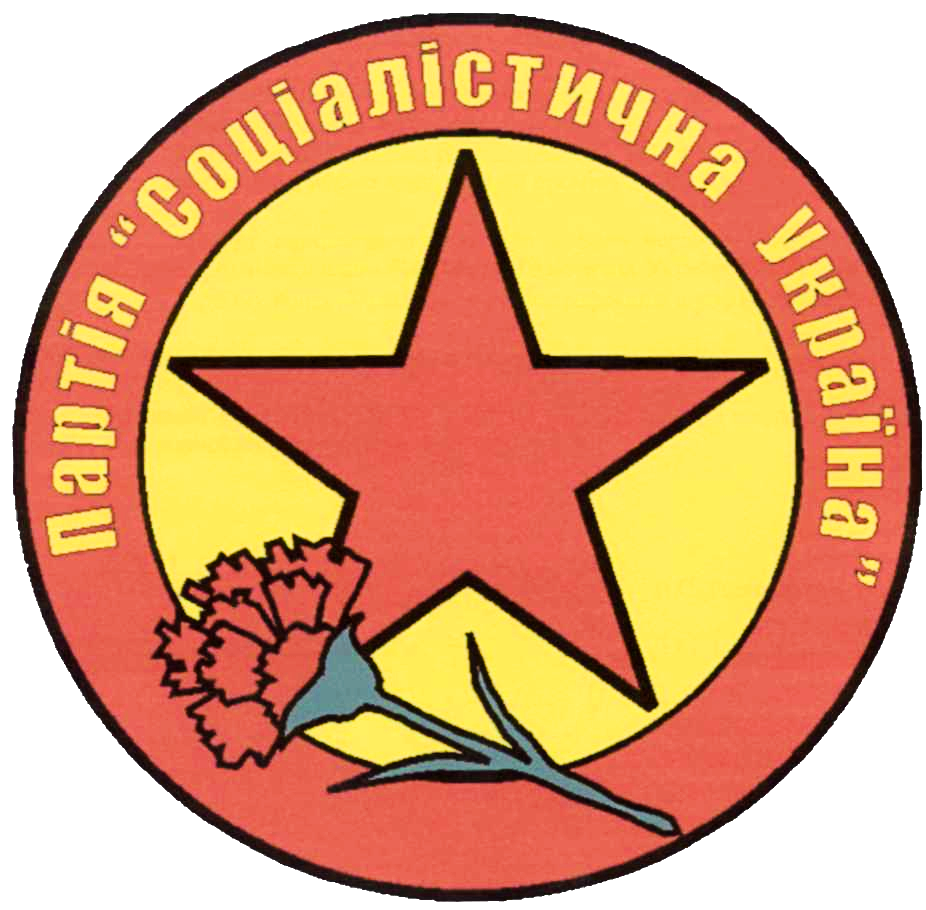
- Leader: Volodymyr Serhiyovych Hoshovskyi
- Founder: Vladimir Goshovsky
- Founded: 12 October 2005
- Registered: 15 September 2004 (as People's Choice Party)
- Preceded by: People's Choice Party
- Merged into: Socialist Party of Ukraine (Allegedly)
- Headquarters: 01001, Kyiv, str. Bazhova, 9
- Ideology: Social democracy Democratic socialism
- Political position: Centre-left
- Colours: Red
- Verkhovna Rada: 0 / 450
- Regions: 0 / 43,122
- Kyiv City Council: 0 / 120

Party flag
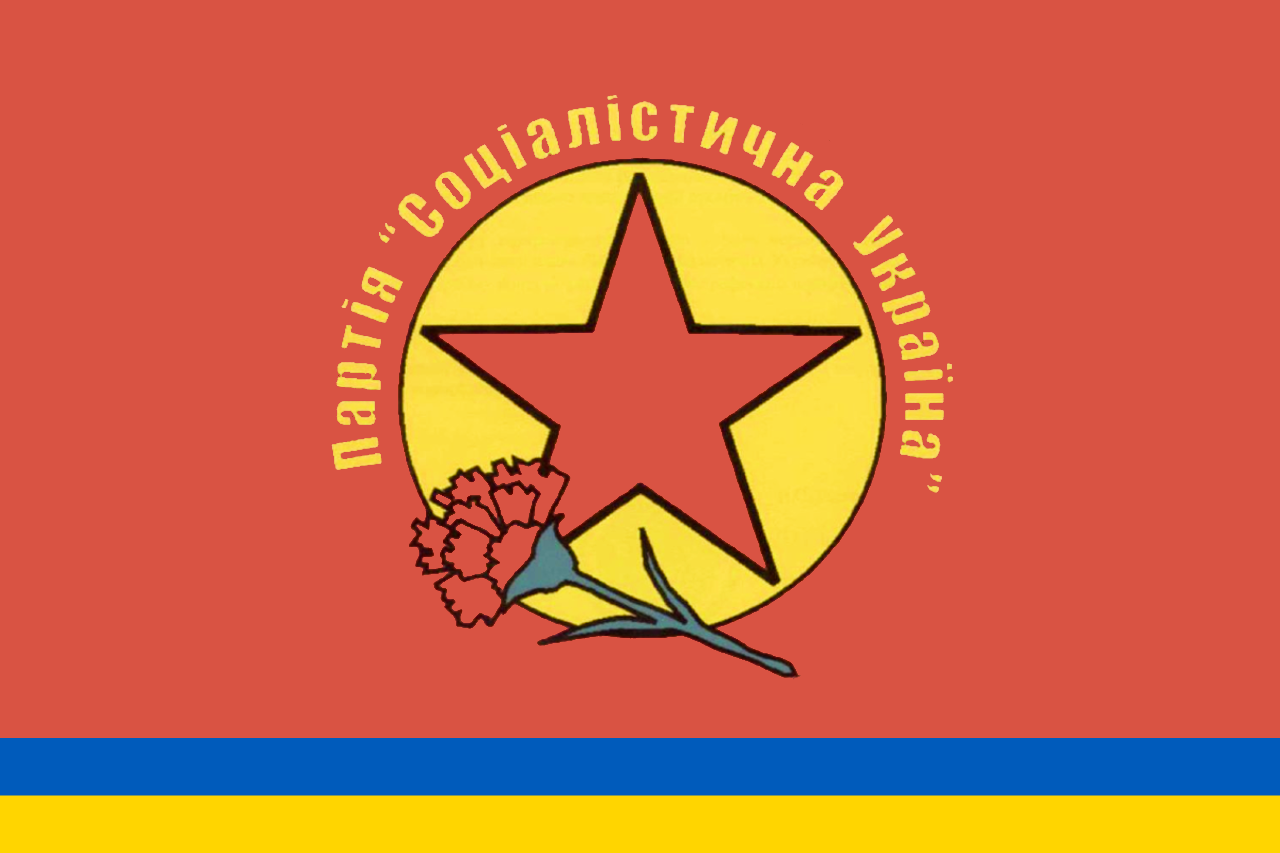

Website
- Official Facebook page

Socialist Ukraine (Ukrainian: Соціалістична Україна, romanized: Sotsialistychna Ukrayina) is a political party in Ukraine. The first head of the party is Victor Blyzniuk. The location of the central statutory bodies was the city of Kharkiv. The party was launched on October 12, 2005 by Vladimir Goshovsky, an expelled MP from the Socialist Party of Ukraine (SPU). Goshovsky accused the SPU of corruption and said it was 'an oligarch party, created for one leader'.

== History ==
Socialist Ukraine officially registered on September 15, 2004 as the People's Choice Party at the Constituent Party Congress in Kharkiv. Registered by the Ministry of Justice of Ukraine on December 23, 2004 (registration number 103-p.p.). Prior to that In 2002, the party participated in the Elections of People's Deputy of Ukraine in a multi-mandate district as part of the Electoral Bloc of political parties "Unity" (Ukrainian: Єдність). Representatives of the bloc did not receive deputy mandates.

At the 2nd congress of the party, held on September 24, 2005, a decision was made on the re-election of the governing bodies (Vladimir Goshovsky was elected as the head of the party at this time). Then changes were made to the statute and program, and the name of the party was changed to the Party "Socialist Ukraine". And on December 15, 2005, a new version of the party's program was approved at the III Party Congress.

In 2006, the party took part in the Elections of People's Deputies of Ukraine in a multi-mandate electoral district as part of the Electoral bloc of political parties "For Union" (Ukrainian: ЗА СОЮЗ). According to the voting results, the bloc's representatives did not enter the parliament as the bloc won 0.20% of the votes.

On December 18, 2011, at the unifying congress of five political forces, the party announced its joining the Socialist Party of Ukraine. But even so, the last national election the party took part in was the 2012 Ukrainian parliamentary election. In this election, the party had 10 candidates in constituencies, but none won a parliamentary seat.

== Party policies and program ==
The main goal of the party was to promote the implementation of popular sovereignty, which is based on the constitutional provision that the only source of power in Ukraine is the Ukrainian people. The main tasks are to promote the development and adoption of effective legislative acts of Ukraine that correspond to and serve to achieve the goal of the creation and activity of the party; participation in the development of civil society, political culture; promoting the implementation of progressive reforms in Ukraine, aimed at the real transformation of Ukraine into a legal, social, democratic state and its integration into the world community; assistance in the development of state policy, the development and implementation of state-building projects and economic reforms that enable the implementation of the principle of people's sovereignty.
