= Hromada (political party) =

Political party in Ukraine

Hromada Громада
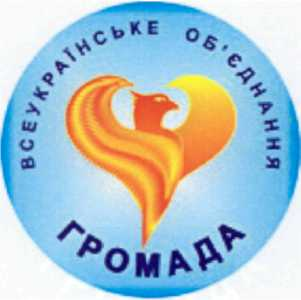
- Leader: Pavlo Lazarenko
- Founder: Pavlo Lazarenko; Oleksandr Turchynov
- Founded: 1994; 32 years ago
- Headquarters: Kyiv
- Ideology: Left-wing populism; Anti-Kuchma
- Political position: Centre-left
- Colours: Orange
- Verkhovna Rada: 0 / 450
- Regions: 3 / 43,122

All-Ukrainian Association "Community" (Ukrainian: Всеукраїнське об'єднання «Громада», romanized: Vseukrayins'ke ob'iednannia «Hromada»), often simply known as Hromada, is a Ukrainian political party registered in March 1994 and reregistered in March 2005. The party's leader was formerly Prime Minister of Ukraine Pavlo Lazarenko.

The party was present in the Verkhovna Rada from 1998 to 2002. Since then, it has unsuccessfully participated in national elections. It has not participated in national elections since the 2012 Ukrainian parliamentary election.

== History ==
In 1994, Hromada was created by Oleksandr Turchynov and Pavlo Lazarenko.

During the 1998 elections the party won 24 seats in the Verkhovna Rada, mainly because of its good results in the Dnipropetrovsk Oblast. The party won 4.7% of the vote and 26 seats in the Verkhovna Rada, 16 proportional and 8 individual.

When Lazarenko fled to the United States in the spring of 1999 to avoid investigations for embezzlement, various faction members left the party to join other parliamentary factions, including Lazarenko's close ally and future Prime Minister of Ukraine Yulia Tymoshenko who set up the Batkivshchyna faction.

The Hromada faction was disbanded in the Verkhovna Rada on 29 February 2000 because it was unable to meet the minimum requirement of fourteen members.

The party did not participate in the 2002 elections.

=== Lazarenko Bloc ===
In the 2006 Ukrainian parliamentary election, Hromada participated in the "Lazarenko Bloc" (Ukrainian: Блок Лазаренка), which consisted of Hromada, the Social Democratic Union, and the Social Democratic Party of Ukraine, but this bloc was supported by only 76,950 voters, or 0.30%, and therefore did not make it to parliament. But the block reached third place in the Dnipropetrovsk Oblast council elections of 2006. Pavlo Lazarenko's brother, Ivan Lazarenko, is vice-chairman of Dnipropetrovsk Oblast council and the party itself governed the city in an alliance with the Party of Regions.

In the 2007 elections the party did not take part because the Central Election Commission of Ukraine refused to register candidates of Hromada as candidates because Hromada did not notify the Central Election Commission of the right date of its congress. The party planned to participate in the elections (again) in an election bloc with the Social Democratic Union. Social Democratic Union did not participate in the 2007 election either.

=== Since 2007 ===
During the 2010 Ukrainian local elections, the party won 2 representatives in the Dnipropetrovsk Oblast Council. In the Dnipropetrovsk City Council, however, the party lost all its seats. In the 2012 Ukrainian parliamentary election, the party won 0.08% of the national votes, and none of the four constituencies it had competed in, thus failing to win parliamentary representation. The Central Election Commission of Ukraine had refused Pavlo Lazarenko's registration for this election.

The party did participate in the 2012 Ukrainian parliamentary election, in 4 simple majority constituencies, but did not win parliamentary representation.

The party did not participate in the 2014 Ukrainian parliamentary election nor the 2019 Ukrainian parliamentary election.

== Election results ==
Parliamentary elections since 1998
| Year | Votes | % | Mandates |
|---|---|---|---|
| 1998 | 1,242,235 | 4.82 | 24 |
| 2002 | Did not participate | | 0 |
| 2006 | As part of Lazarenko Bloc | | 0 |
| 2007 | Did not participate | | 0 |
| 2012 | Did not participate | | 0 |
| 2014 | Did not participate | | 0 |
| 2019 | Did not participate | | 0 |
