= New Politics (Ukraine) =

New Politics Нова політика
- Leader: Volodymyr Semynozhenko
- Founded: 14 February 2001
- Headquarters: Kyiv
- National affiliation: Opposition Bloc (2014–2018)
- Verkhovna Rada (2014) (Note: Part of the Opposition Bloc until 2018.): 29 / 450
- Regions: 39 / 43,122

Website
- http://new-politics.org.ua/

New Politics (Ukrainian: Нова політика) is a political party in Ukraine registered in February 2001. The party is led by former Party of Regions lawmaker and former Vice Premier Minister in the Azarov Government Volodymyr Semynozhenko.

== History ==
Until 2012, the party did not take part in national elections. In March 2009 Semynozhenko was elected party leader of the party. In the 2012 Ukrainian parliamentary election the party won 0.10% of the national votes and no constituencies (it had competed in 26 constituencies) and thus failed to win parliamentary representation.

In the 2014 Ukrainian parliamentary election members of the party took part in the elections on the party list of Opposition Bloc; Opposition Bloc won 29 seats.

The party did not take part in the 2019 Ukrainian parliamentary election

In the 2020 Ukrainian local elections the party gained 39 deputies (0.09% of all available mandates).
