= People's Labor Union of Ukraine =

Political party

Party's banner reminiscent with the flag of Galicia after the 1848 Revolution in Europe

People's Labor Union of Ukraine, NTSU (Ukrainian: Народно-трудовий союз України, romanized: Narodno-trudovyi soiuz Ukrainy) is a political party of Ukraine of center-left type that was officially registered in 2006. It was not until 2012 the party started to participate in parliamentary elections. The party's flag is similar to the flag of Kingdom of Galicia and Lodomeria.

The party was registered right after its constituent congress that took place on April 11, 2006.

The second party congress took place in Luhansk on August 21, 2010. The congress elected Valentyn Zubov as the party's leader. Zubov had been elected to parliament in the 2002 Ukrainian parliamentary election, 2006 Ukrainian parliamentary election and 2007 Ukrainian parliamentary election for Yulia Tymoshenko Bloc.

People's Labor Union of Ukraine took part in the 2010 Ukrainian local elections in Vinnytsia Oblast, Zhytomyr Oblast and Cherkasy Oblast, but won no seats.

The third party congress was planning to take place in March 2011 in preparation to the 2012 Ukrainian parliamentary elections. In this election the party gained 22,854 votes (0.11% of the total vote) and no seats. The party has not taken part in elections since.
