= Greens (Ukraine) =

Greens (Ukrainian: Зелені) is a political party of Ukraine that before 2010 was known as Volia (Ukrainian: Воля). The party was created in 2008.

The party participated in the 2012 Ukrainian parliamentary elections and obtained vote of 51,386 people, which is 0.25%. Greens did not earn any seats in parliament.

== History ==
The Greens Party was registered by the Ministry of Justice of Ukraine on October 16, 2008. It was originally called Volia, and was based in Kharkiv. Businessman Hennadiy Anatoliyovych Fedorovsky was elected the head of the organization.

At the end of 2009, the party chairman resigned, and Oleksandr Prognimak, a well-known Kyiv businessman and official, a former member of the Party of Regions faction in the Verkhovna Rada, was elected as a new leader. At the same time, the party changed its name to "Green" and officially moved from Kharkiv to Kyiv.

In the parliamentary elections to the Verkhovna Rada of Ukraine in 2012 the party received 0.25% (51,369 votes) and did not get into parliament.
