= Party of Pensioners of Ukraine =

Political party

The Party of Pensioners of Ukraine (Ukrainian: Партія Пенсіонерів України, romanized: Partiia Pensioneriv Ukrainy) is a political party in Ukraine registered in November 1999. Although the party plays no role nationwide, it enjoys popularity in Kharkiv Oblast.

== History ==
The party was not allowed to participate in the electoral alliance "Rainbow" in the Ukrainian 2002 parliamentary elections.

The party ran independently in the 2006 parliamentary elections winning 0.20% of the votes and no seats.

In the 30 September 2007 elections, the party failed again as part of the Bloc of the Party of Pensioners of Ukraine to win parliamentary representation.

Amram Petrosyan headed the party between 2010 and 2012. Under his leadership, the party achieved the highest success in its history, taking the 9th place in the 2012 Ukrainian parliamentary elections. Despite its rank increase, the party won 0.56% of the national votes and no constituencies (it had competed in 6 constituencies) and thus failed once more to win parliamentary representation.

The party did participate in the 2014 Ukrainian parliamentary election; but again won no seats. The party did participate in the 2019 Ukrainian parliamentary election (only) in selected single-mandate constituencies, but won no votes.
