= Head of the Republic of Crimea =

Highest-ranking official in Crimea

- Глава Республики Крым (Russian); Глава Республіки Крим (Ukrainian); Къырым Джумхурийетининъ Къафа (Crimean Tatar)
- Coat of arms of Crimea

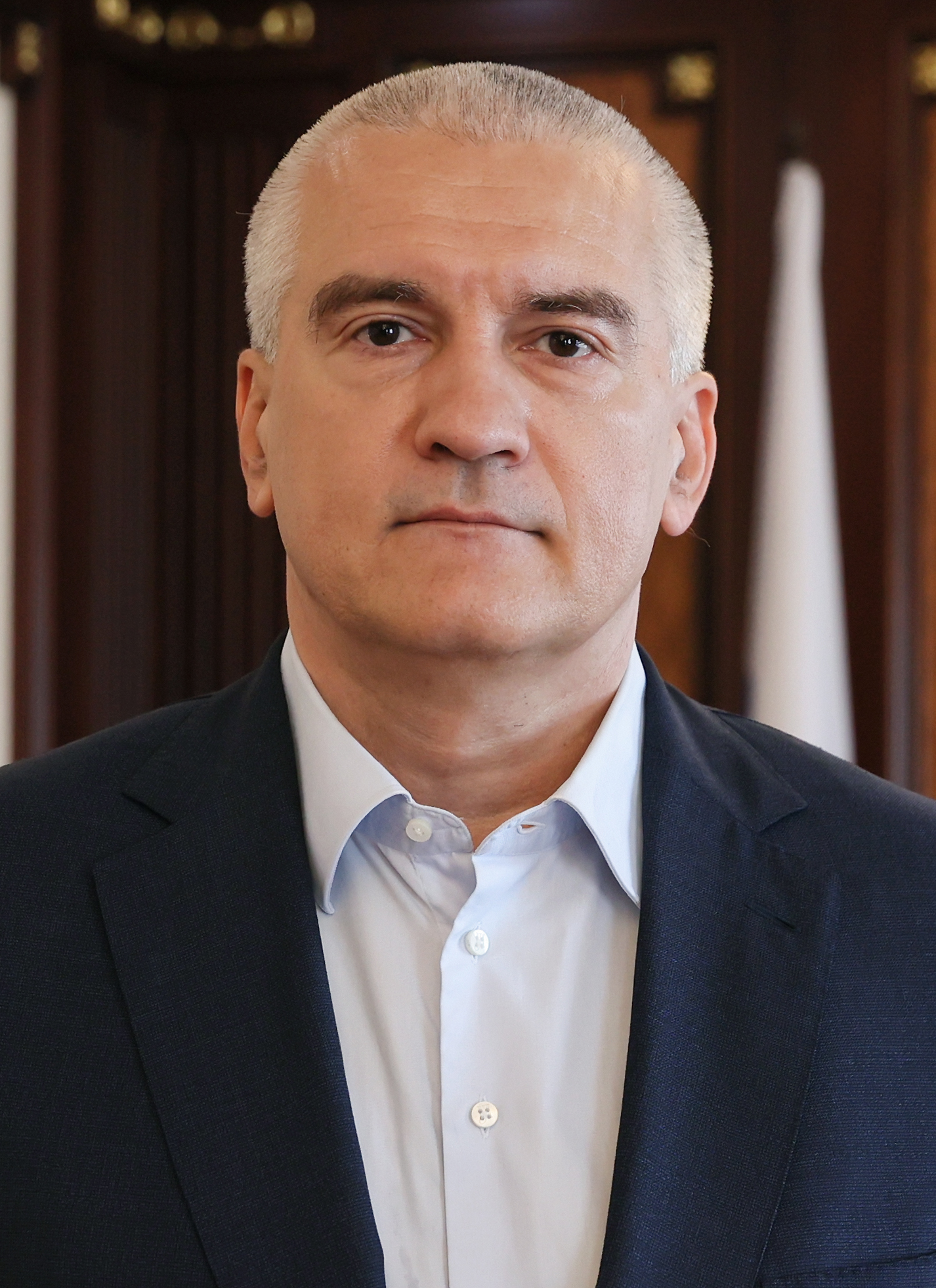
- Incumbent; Sergey Aksyonov since 9 October 2014 (Note: The transition from the Ukrainian to the Russian administration lasted a week, from 11 to 18 March 2014. In those days, although formally it was still part of Ukraine, the Crimean government already legislated autonomously, with acts recognized by the Russian Federation, but not Ukraine. Sergey Aksyonov, the last president of the Ukrainian Council of Ministers of Crimea, continued to exercise his role as interim head of government until 14 April, and then governed as interim head of state until the elections held on 9 October 2014, in which his mandate was confirmed.)
- Executive branch of the Republic of Crimea
- Style: His Excellency; The Honorable
- Type: Governor; Head of state; Head of government
- Residence: Simferopol
- Nominator: President of the Russian Federation
- Appointer: State Council
- Term length: Five years, no more than two consecutive terms
- Precursor: President of Crimea
- Formation: 9 October 2014
- First holder: Sergey Aksyonov
- Website: Official website

The Head of the Republic of Crimea is the highest official and the head of the executive power of the Republic of Crimea, an internationally disputed federal subject of the Russian Federation located on the Crimean Peninsula.

Crimean Head's policy is to ensure compliance with the Constitution and federal laws and the Constitution and laws of the Republic of Crimea, as well as the equality of nations and the rights and freedoms of man and citizen, and the preservation of the coordinated functioning of state bodies of the Republic. Person under 30 cannot be a head of the Republic.

Term of office is five years. Appointed by the State Council of the Republic on nomination of President of the Russian Federation. Interim Head of the Republic is appointed directly by President.

The current Head of the Republic Sergey Aksyonov was elected in 2014 and re-elected in 2019.

== History ==
=== Background ===
The Crimean Peninsula, historically part of Imperial Russia and later an Autonomous Soviet Socialist Republic, was ceded in 1954 to Ukraine, which administered it until its annexation by Russia in 2014.

=== Ukrainian President of Crimea ===
Under Ukrainian rule, an equivalent post, named President of the Republic of Crimea (Russian: Президент Республики Крым, romanized: Prezident Respubliki Krym), was provided by the 1992 Constitution of the Republic of Crimea (de facto a special statute), with jurisdiction over the autonomous city of Sevastopol too. The first presidential elections took place in 1994, won by the pro-Russian separatist Yuriy Meshkov (leader of a coalition named "Russia"), but on 17 March 1995 the Ukrainian parliament, as part of a wider process of reduction of the Crimean autonomy, unilaterally abolished both the statute and the post of President of Crimea.

=== From Ukraine to the Russian Federation ===
In the immediate aftermath of the revolution of Dignity, on 27 February 2014, Russian special forces without insignia stormed the Crimean parliament. A few hours later, pro-Russian deputy Sergey Aksyonov came into the parliament, and asked some of the other deputies to come as well. After the deputies summoned by Aksyonov were let in by the Russian soldiers guarding the parliament building, two votes were held. The first one appointed Aksyonov as the new Prime Minister of Crimea, and the second called for a referendum on Crimea's secession from Ukraine. The results for both of these votes were unanimous. One week later, Aksyonov and other deputies held another vote, resulting in an appeal for Russia to annex Crimea.

On 16 March, a referendum on Crimea's status was held, with the results being overwhelmingly in favor of joining Russia. The next day, 17 March 2014, Crimea's newly installed authorities declared independence and requested to join Russia. On the same day, Russia recognized the Republic of Crimea as a sovereign state.

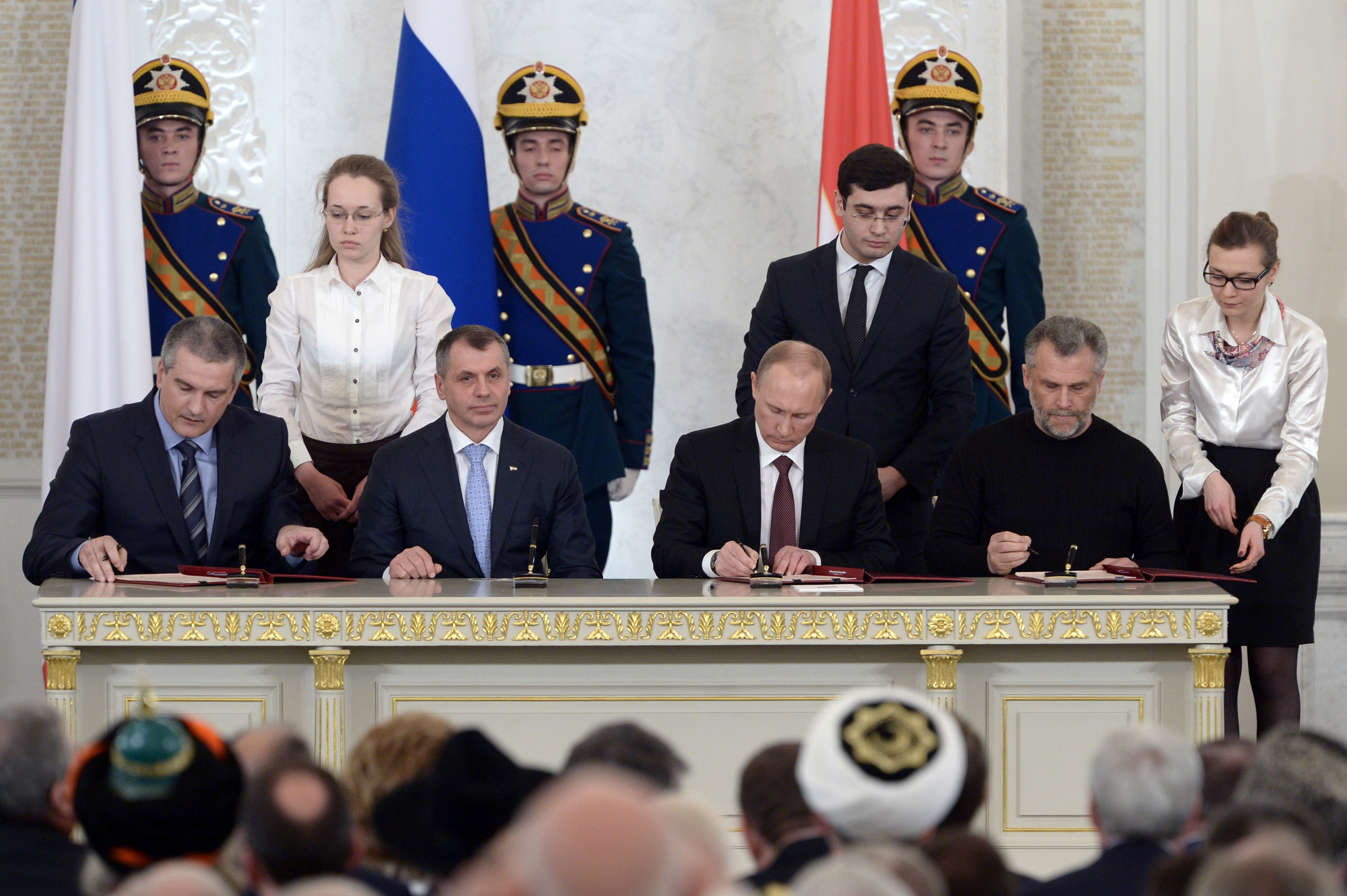
Left to right: Aksyonov, Konstantinov, Putin and Chaly, signing the Treaty on Accession of the Republic of Crimea to Russia

On 18 March, the Crimean authorities signed the accession treaty to the Russian Federation, thus forming the Crimean Federal District, subsequently merged into the Southern Federal District.

On 11 April, the State Council of the Republic of Crimea consequently ratified a new constitution, providing for the post of Head of the Republic of Crimea, effective from 14 April of the same year.

== Eligibility and authorities ==
Under article 62 of the Constitution of the Republic of Crimea, approved by the State Council on 11 April 2014 and entered into force the following day, any Russian citizen who has reached the age of thirty can take up the post, provided that he has not been subjected to restrictions on civil and political rights.

Formally a head of state, the head of the republic is actually a governor, subordinate to the president of the Russian Federation; he oversees the executive, and has the right to legislative initiative in the State Council, which he can also convene exceptionally.

Furthermore, under articles 61–65 of the Constitution, he:

- appoints and dismisses, with the consent of the State Council, the Chairman of the Council of Ministers, without prejudice to the possibility of simultaneously holding both posts, as well as the ministers and other senior officials of the Republic;
- represents the Republic of Crimea in relations with the central government and other local authorities of the Russian Federation, as well as with foreign economic representatives; and signs treaties in the name of the Republic;
- signs and promulgates the laws of the Republic of Crimea; and adopts presidential decrees.

=== Presidential appointed officials ===
- Prosecutor General: Natalia Poklonskaya, appointed by Sergey Aksyonov on 11 March 2014 (although the right of appointment has passed to the Prosecutor General of the Russian Federation, her mandate was confirmed ad interim on 25 March and definitively on 2 May 2014 by Yury Chaika, ending on 6 October 2016);
- Representative to the Federation Council: Olga Kovitidi, appointed by Sergey Aksyonov on 15 April 2014;
- Prime Minister: Yury Gotsanyuk, appointed by Sergey Aksyonov on 20 September 2019.
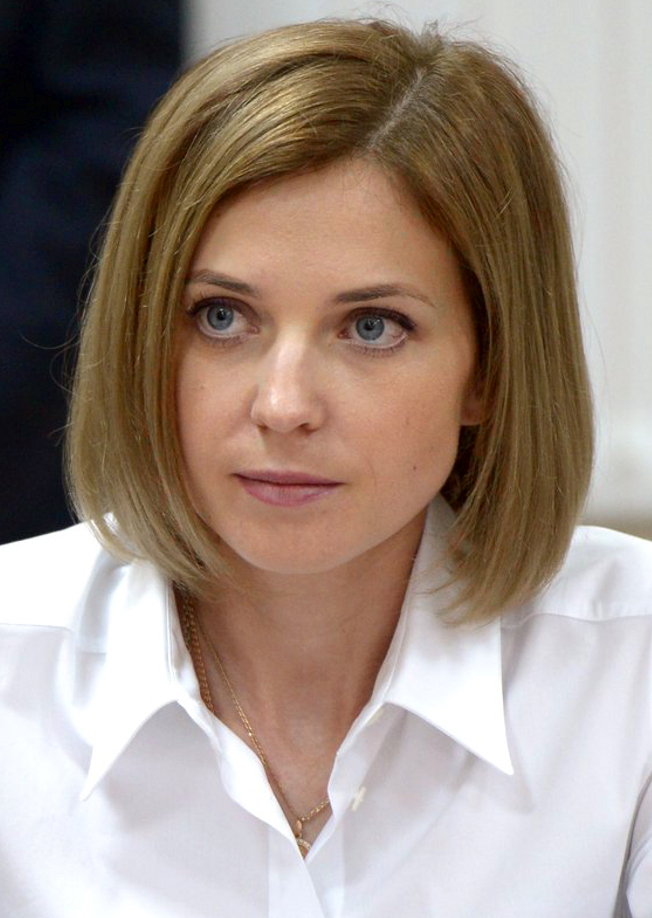
Natalia Vladimirovna Poklonskaya

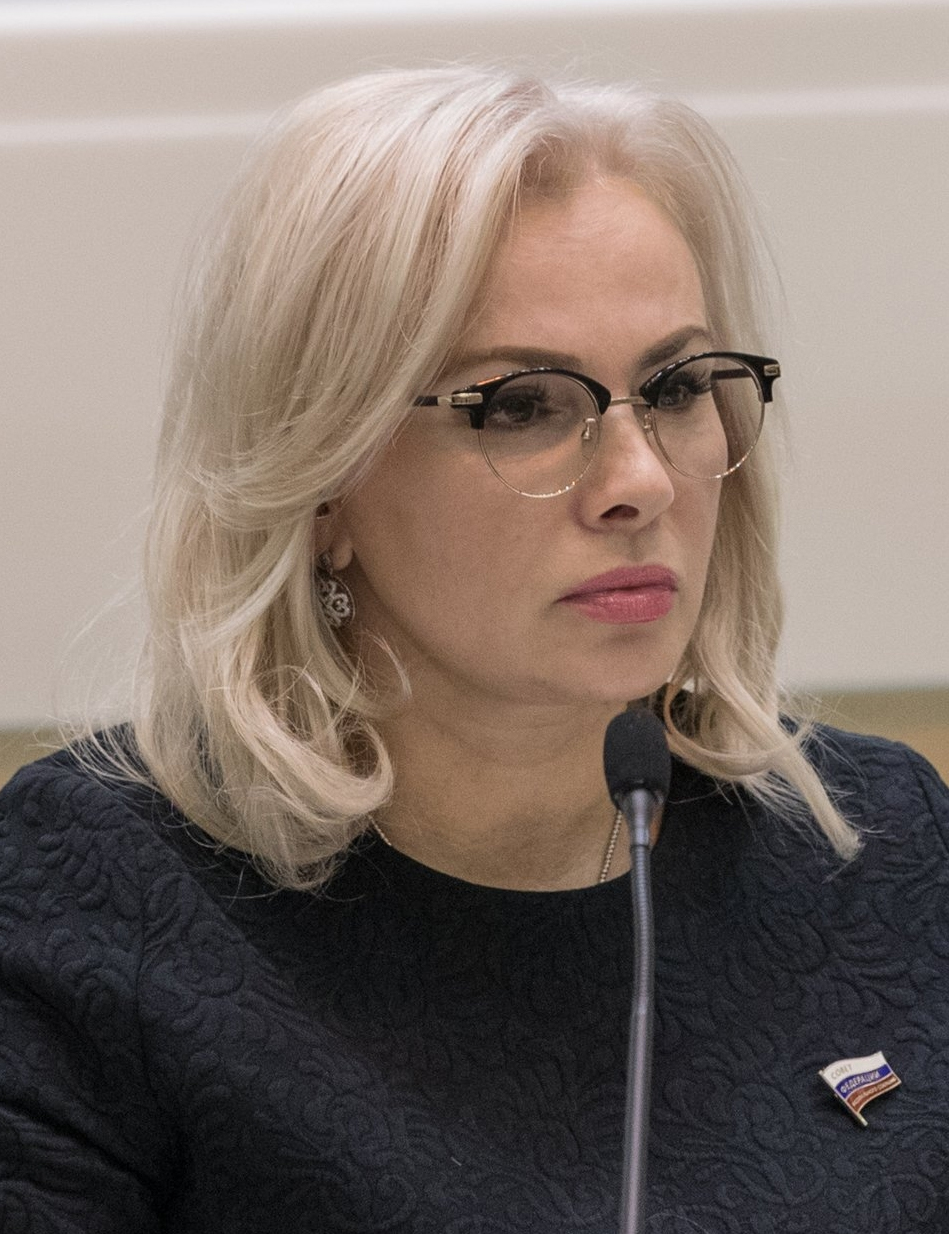
Olga Fyodorovna Kovitidi

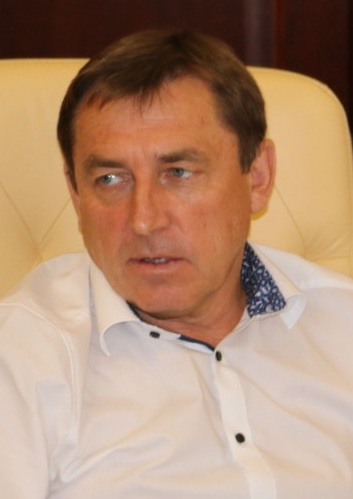
Yury Mikhailovich Gotsanyuk

== List ==
No.	Portrait	Name	Political party	Election	Term of office			Prime minister(s)	Ref.
No.	Portrait	Name	Political party	Election	Took office	Left office	Time in office	Prime minister(s)	Ref.
1		Sergey Aksyonov; 26 November 1972 (age 53)	United Russia	— (Note: Appointed by the President of the Russian Federation as interim Head of Republic.)	14 April 2014	9 October 2014	178 days	Himself	
1		Sergey Aksyonov; 26 November 1972 (age 53)	United Russia	2014	9 October 2014	19 September 2019	11 years, 333 days	Himself	
1		Sergey Aksyonov; 26 November 1972 (age 53)	United Russia	2019	20 September 2019	Incumbent	11 years, 333 days	Yury Gotsanyuk	

== Elections ==
=== 2014 ===
Three candidates were nominated for the election:

- Sergey Aksyonov, interim Head of the Republic;
- Gennady Naraev, Minister of Ecology and Natural Resources of Crimea;
- Alexander Terentyev, Deputy of the State Duma.

Candidate	Party	Votes	%
Sergey Aksyonov	United Russia	75	100
Gennady Narayev	United Russia	0	0
Alexander Terentyev	A Just Russia	0	0
Total		75	100
Source:ТАСС

=== 2019 ===
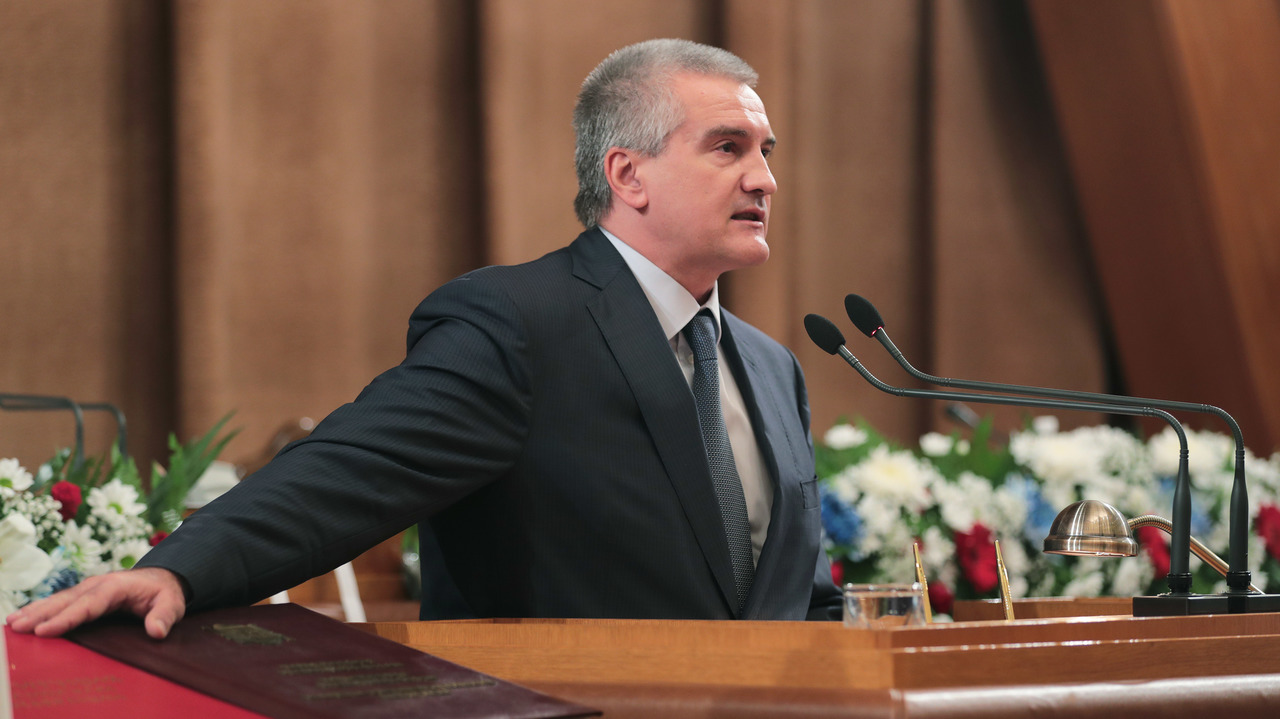
2019 inauguration of Aksyonov

Three candidates were nominated for the election:

- Sergey Aksyonov, incumbent Head of the Republic;
- Pavel Shperov, Deputy of the State Duma;
- Sergey Bogatyrenko, Deputy of the State Council of Crimea.

Candidate	Party	Votes	%
Sergey Aksyonov	United Russia	74	98.7
Pavel Shperov	Liberal Democratic Party	0	0
Sergey Bogatyrenko	Communist Party	0	0
Total		75	100
Source:ТАСС
