= Mikhail Sheremet =

Russian and former Ukrainian politician

- Михаил Шеремет
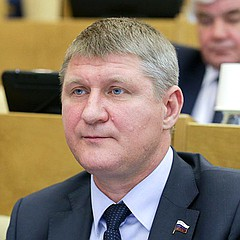

Member of the State Duma
- Incumbent
- Assumed office 5 October 2016

First Deputy Chairman of the Council of Ministers of the Republic of Crimea
- In office 20 March 2014 – 5 October 2016

Personal details
- Born: Mikhail Sergeyevich Sheremet; 23 May 1971 (age 55) Dzhankoy, Crimean Oblast, Ukrainian SSR, Soviet Union
- Party: United Russia (since 2014)
- Other political affiliations: Russian Unity (2010–2014)

Mikhail Sergeyevich Sheremet (Russian: Михаил Сергеевич Шеремет; Ukrainian: Михайло Сергійович Шеремет, romanized: Mykhailo Serhiiovych Sheremet; born 23 May 1971) is a Russian and former Ukrainian politician serving as a member of the State Duma and a member of the State Duma Committee on Energy since 5 October 2016. Previously, he served as First Deputy Chairman of the Council of Ministers of Crimea from 2014 to 2016.

== Biography ==
Mikhail Sheremet was born on 23 May 1971 in Dzhankoy, which was then part of the Crimean Oblast of the Ukrainian Soviet Socialist Republic. From 1988 to 1989, he worked at the Dzhankoi Machine-building Plant as an apprentice turner. In 1993, he received a higher military education, graduating from the Simferopol Higher Military-Political Construction School. In 1995, he graduated from the retraining specialty "Financier" at the International Institute of Management, Business and Law of the International Academy of Sciences of San Marino (the institute was located in the city of Sloviansk, Ukraine and closed in 1996).

After graduating from a military school, he served in the Ukrainian Army until 2002. After dismissal from military service from 2002 to 2004, he worked in the Simferopol branch of the producer of wine and vodka products "Soyuz-Victan Ltd." as a security officer. From 2004 to 2009, he worked at the Tavrida Corporation as Deputy President of the Corporation for Security and Safety. From May to October 2009 he worked at Monolit-Plus LLC as a deputy director. From 2009 to 2010, he worked in the open joint-stock company I. M. Kuibyshev Simferopol Automobile Repair Plant as deputy director for General Issues. From 2010 to 2014, he worked in the Ukrainian pro-Russian political party "Russian Unity", leading the Simferopol city chapter of the party.

In 2014, Sheremet collaborated with the Russian occupational forces and was the commander of the 'people's militia" of the breakaway Republic of Crimea. From 2014 to 2016, Sheremet worked in the Russian Council of Ministers of Crimea, as he hold the position of deputy chairman, then promoted First Deputy Chairman of the Council of Ministers. He was also sanctioned by the British government.

In April 2014, he joined the United Russia party.

In 2018, he underwent retraining at the Russian Presidential Academy of National Economy and Public Administration.

Following the Crocus City Hall attack in March 2024, Shreremet called for the introduction of a total ban on immigration until Russia finishes its "special military operation," as the Kremlin calls its invasion of Ukraine. According to Sheremet, any foreigner entering Russia could be suspected to be a terrorist or a saboteur.

=== Legislative activity ===
From 2016 to 2019, during the term of office of a deputy of the State Duma of the VII convocation, he co-authored 136 legislative initiatives and amendments to draft federal laws.

== Legal issues ==
In February 2019, Sheremet was accused of beating a disabled person. He himself denied all charges, stating that he was far from the victim, Igor Nikitenko. In turn, Sheremet said that the visitor not only hit him, but also doused him with green stuff. The police were called to the scene. Currently, the Investigative Committee of Russia is examining the circumstances of the incident.
