= Constitution of Crimea =

Constitution of Crimea may refer to:

- Constitution of the Autonomous Republic of Crimea, the 'de jure' republic of Ukraine
- Constitution of the Republic of Crimea, the 'de facto' republic of Russia since 2014
