= Republic of Crimea (Russia) =

First-level administrative division of Russia, annexed territory of Ukraine

Republic of Crimea: Республика Крым (Russian); Республіка Крим (Ukrainian); Къырым Джумхуриети (Crimean Tatar)
- Republic (Note: Sovereignty disputed by Ukraine as the Autonomous Republic of Crimea)
- Flag Coat of arms
- Anthem: Славься, Крым, отчий дом Slavsya, Krym, otchyy dom (Russian); Glory to Crimea, our ancestral home"
- Location of the Republic of Crimea (Russia) (red) in Russia (light yellow)

- Location of the Republic of Crimea (Russia) (light yellow) in the Crimean Peninsula
- Coordinates: 45°18′N 34°24′E
- Federal district: Southern
- Economic region: North Caucasus
- Capture of the Crimean parliament by Russian forces: 27 February 2014
- Annexation by Russia: 18 March 2014
- Administrative centre: Simferopol

Government
  - Body: State Council
  - Head: Sergey Aksyonov
  - Prime Minister: Yury Gotsanyuk

Area
  - Total: 26,081 km^{2} (10,070 sq mi)

Population (2021)
  - Total: 1,934,630
  - Density: 74.178/km^{2} (192.12/sq mi)

Languages
  - Official: Russian; Ukrainian; Crimean Tatar
- Time zone: UTC+03:00 (MSK)
- License plates: 82
- Website: rk.gov.ru

The Republic of Crimea (Note: /kraɪˈmiːə, krɪˈmiːə/ kry-MEE-ə, krim-EE-ə; Russian: Республика Крым, romanized: Respublika Krym, IPA: [rʲɪsˈpublʲɪkə ˈkrɨm]; Ukrainian: Республіка Крим, romanized: Respublika Krym, IPA: [resˈpubl⁽ʲ⁾ikɐ ˈkrɪm]; Crimean Tatar: Къырым Джумхуриети, romanized: Qırım Cumhuriyeti.) is a republic of Russia, comprising most of the Crimean Peninsula, but excluding Sevastopol. Its territory corresponds to the pre-2023 territory of the Autonomous Republic of Crimea, a de jure subdivision of Ukraine. Russia occupied and annexed the peninsula in 2014, although the annexation remains internationally unrecognized.

The capital and largest city located within its borders is Simferopol, which is the second-largest city on the Crimean Peninsula. As of the 2021 Russian census, the Republic of Crimea had a population of 1,934,630.

== History ==
=== 2014 annexation ===
In February 2014, following the 2014 Ukrainian revolution that ousted the Ukrainian President, Viktor Yanukovych, the Russian leadership decided to "start working on returning Crimea to Russia" (i.e. envisaged the annexation of the peninsula), and after a takeover of Crimea by Russian armed forces without insignias and pro-Russian separatists, the territory within weeks came under Russian effective control.

To facilitate the annexation politically, on 6 March the Crimean parliament and the Sevastopol City Council announced a referendum on the issue of joining Russia. This referendum, the holding of which was a violation of the Ukrainian Constitution, was to be held on 16 March. The upcoming vote allowed citizens to vote on whether Crimea should apply to join Russia as a federal subject of the Russian Federation, or restore the 1992 Crimean constitution and Crimea's status as a part of Ukraine. The available choices did not include keeping the status quo of Crimea and Sevastopol as they were at the time the referendum was held.

On 11 March 2014, the Crimean parliament and the Sevastopol City Council jointly issued a letter of intent to unilaterally declare independence from Ukraine in the event of a "Yes" vote in the upcoming referendum, citing the "Kosovo precedent" in the lead part. The envisaged process was so designed to allow Russia to claim that "it did not annex Crimea from Ukraine, rather the Republic of Crimea exercised its sovereign powers in seeking a merge with Russia".

On 16 March 2014, according to the organizers of Crimean status referendum, a large majority (reported as 96.77% of the 81.36% of the population of Crimea who voted) voted in favour of independence of Crimea from Ukraine and joining Russia as a federal subject. The referendum was not recognized by most of the international community and the reported results were disputed by numerous independent observers. The BBC reported that most of the Crimean Tatars that they interviewed were boycotting the vote. Reports from the UN criticised the circumstances surrounding the referendum, especially the presence of paramilitaries, self-defence groups and unidentifiable soldiers. The European Union, Canada, Japan and the United States condemned the vote as illegal.

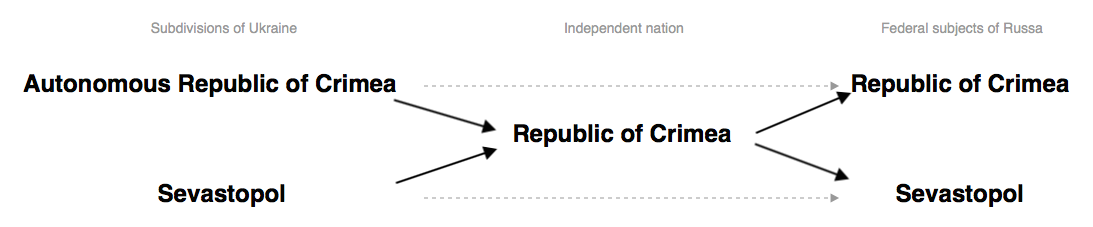
Diagram showing the merge, short-lived independence, and separation of the Autonomous Republic of Crimea and Sevastopol that led to the Republic of Crimea becoming a federal subject of Russia.

After the referendum, Crimean lawmakers formally voted both to secede from Ukraine and applied for their admission into Russia. The Sevastopol City Council, however, requested the port's separate admission as a federal city. On the same day Russia formally approved the draft treaty on absorption of the self-proclaimed Republic of Crimea, and on 18 March 2014 the political process of annexation was formally concluded, with the self-proclaimed independent Republic of Crimea signing a treaty of accession to the Russian Federation. The accession was granted but separately for each the former regions that composed it: one accession for the Autonomous Republic of Crimea as the Republic of Crimea—the same name as the short-lived self-proclaimed independent republic—and another accession for Sevastopol as a federal city. A post-annexation transition period, during which Russian authorities were to resolve the issues of integration of the new subjects "in the economic, financial, credit and legal system of the Russian Federation", was set to last until 1 January 2015.

The change of status of Crimea was only recognised internationally by a few states with most regarding the action as illegal. Ukraine refused to accept the annexation, however the Ukrainian military began to withdraw from Crimea on 19 March, and by 26 March, Russia had acquired complete military control of Crimea, so the annexation was essentially complete.

=== Post-annexation integration ===
The post-annexation integration process started within days. On 24 March, the Russian ruble went into official circulation with parallel circulation of the Ukrainian hryvnia permitted until 1 January 2016, however, taxes and fees were to be paid in rubles only, and the wages of employees at budget-receiving organisations were to be paid out in rubles as well. On 29 March, the clocks in Crimea were moved forward to Moscow time. Also on 31 March, the Russian Foreign Ministry declared that foreign citizens visiting Crimea needed to apply for a visa to the Russian Federation at one of Russian diplomatic missions or its consulates.

On 3 April 2014, Moscow sent a diplomatic note to Ukraine on terminating the actions of agreements concerning the deployment of the Russian Federation's Black Sea Fleet on the territory of Ukraine. As part of the agreements, Russia used to pay the Ukrainian government $530 million annually for the base, and wrote off nearly $100 million of Kyiv's debt for the right to use Ukrainian waters. Ukraine also received a discount of $100 on each 1,000 cubic meters of natural gas imported from Russia, which was provided for by cutting export duties on the gas, money that would have gone into the Russian state budget. The Kremlin explained that because the base was no longer located in Ukraine, the discount was no longer legally justifiable. Crimea and the city of Sevastopol became part of Russia's Southern Military District.

On 11 April 2014, the parliament of Crimea approved a new constitution, with 88 out of 100 lawmakers voting in favor of its adoption. The new constitution confirms the Republic of Crimea as a democratic state within the Russian Federation and declares both territories united and inseparable. The Crimean parliament would become smaller and have 75 members instead of the current 100. According to the Kommersant newspaper, the authorities, including the State Council chair Vladimir Konstantinov, unofficially promised that certain quotas would be reserved for Crimean Tatars in various government bodies. On the same day, a new revision of the Russian Constitution was officially published, with the Republic of Crimea and the federal city of Sevastopol included in the list of federal subjects of the Russian Federation.

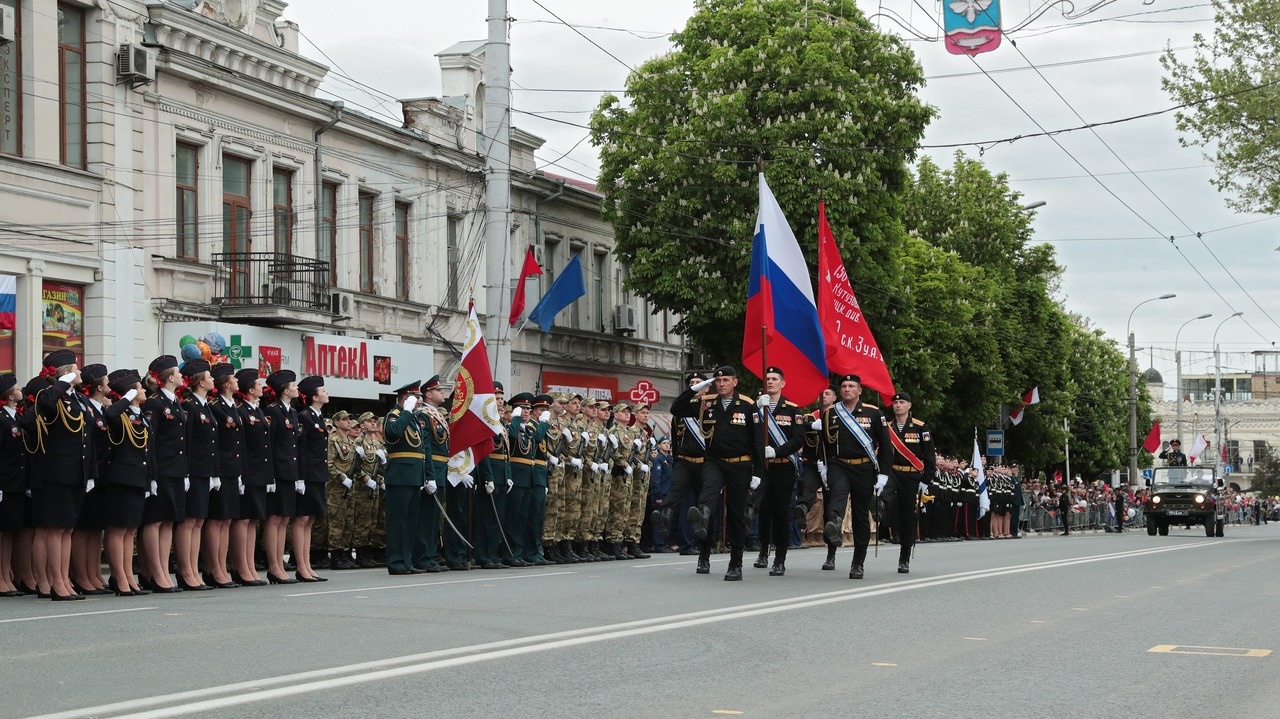
Simferopol, Crimea, 9 May 2019, the celebration of the Victory Day

On 12 April 2014, the Constitution of the Republic of Crimea, adopted at the session of the State Council on 11 April, entered into legal force. The constitution was published by the Krymskiye Izvestiya newspaper, becoming law on the publication date, the State Council of Crimea said. The Constitution consists of 10 chapters and 95 articles; its main regulations are analogous to the articles of the Constitution of the Russian Federation. The text proclaims the Republic of Crimea is a democratic, legal state within the Russian Federation and an equal subject of the Russian Federation. The source of power in the Crimean Republic is its people, which constitutes to the multinational nation of the Russian Federation. It is noted that the supreme direct manifestation of the power of the people is referendum and free elections; seizure of power and appropriation of power authorization are unacceptable.

On 1 June 2014, Crimea officially switched over to the Russian ruble as its only form of legal tender.

On 7 May 2015, Crimea switched its phone codes (Ukrainian number system) to the Russian number system.

In July 2015, Russian Prime Minister, Dmitry Medvedev, declared that Crimea had been fully integrated into Russia, similar statements were also expressed at the Russian Security Council.

In July 2016, Crimea ceased to be a separate federal district of the Russian Federation and was included into the Southern federal district instead.

Russia has since the annexation supported large migration into Crimea, and the Office of the Federal State Statistics Service in Crimea and Sevastopol records as of 2021 since 2014 205,559 Russians have moved to Crimea. Ukrainian Ministry and Crimean Human Rights Group say the real number could unofficially be many times higher.

=== Infrastructure ===
On 31 March 2014, the Russian Prime Minister Dmitry Medvedev announced a series of programmes aimed at swiftly incorporating the territory into Russia's economy and infrastructure. The creation of a new Ministry of Crimean Affairs was announced too. After 2014 the Russian government invested heavily in the peninsula's infrastructure—repairing roads, modernizing hospitals and building the Crimean Bridge that links the peninsula to the Russian mainland.

In 2017 the Russian government also began modernising the Simferopol International Airport, which opened its new terminal in April 2018.

Russia provides electricity to Crimea via a cable beneath the Kerch Strait. In June 2018 there was a full electrical outage for all of Crimea, but the power grid company Rosseti reported to have fixed the outage in approximately one hour.

On 28 December 2018, Russia completed a high-tech security fence marking the border between Crimea and Ukraine.

=== Ukrainian reaction ===
Once Ukraine lost control of the territory in 2014, it shut off the water supply of the North Crimean Canal which supplies 85% of the peninsula's freshwater needs from the Dnieper river, the nation's main waterway. Development of new sources of water was undertaken, with huge difficulties, to replace closed Ukrainian sources. In 2022, Russia conquered portions of Kherson Oblast, which allowed it to unblock the North Crimean canal by force, resuming water supply into Crimea.

On 15 April 2014, the Ukrainian Parliament declared Crimea and the city of Sevastopol "occupied territories".

In 2021, Ukraine launched the Crimea Platform, a diplomatic initiative aimed at protecting the rights of Crimean inhabitants and ultimately reversing the illegal annexation of Crimea.

== Government and politics ==
The State Council of Crimea is a legislative body with a 75-seat parliament. The polling held on 14 September 2014 resulted in United Russia securing 70 of the 75 members elected.

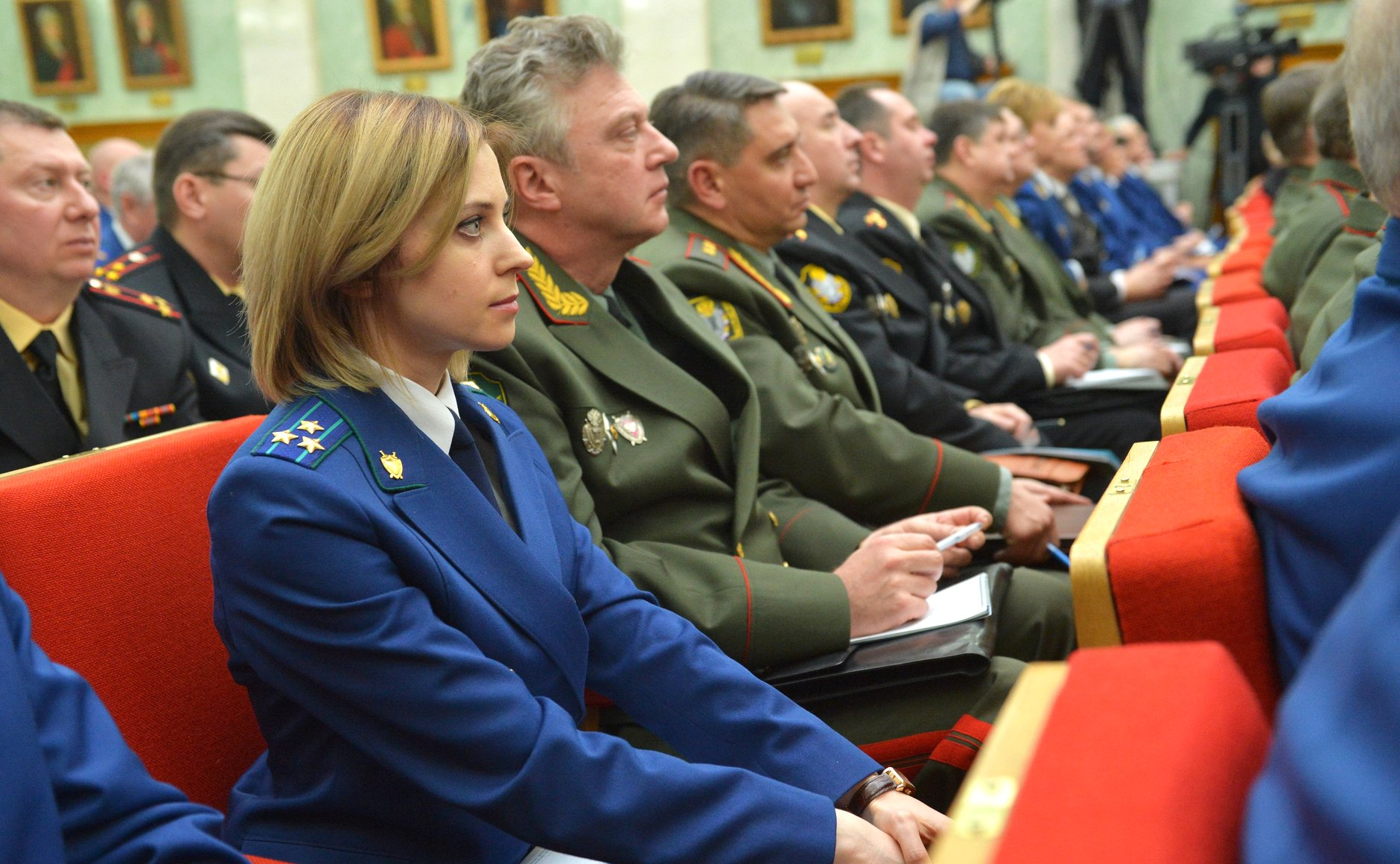
Natalia Poklonskaya, Prosecutor of the Republic of Crimea, March 2015

Justice is administered by courts, as part of the judiciary of Russia. Under Russian law, all decisions delivered by the Crimean branches of the judiciary of Ukraine up to its annexation remain valid. This includes sentences (for "encroaching on Ukraine's territorial integrity and inviolability") for pre-2014 calls for an incorporation of Crimea into Russia.

The executive power is represented by the Council of Ministers, headed either by the Prime Minister of Crimea or by the Head of the Republic of Crimea. The authority and operation of the State Council and the Council of Ministers of Crimea are determined by the Constitution of the Republic of Crimea and other Crimean laws, as well as by regular decisions carried out by the Council.

Crimeans who refused to take Russian citizenship are barred from holding government positions or municipal jobs.

By July 2015, 20,000 Crimeans had renounced their Ukrainian citizenship. From the time of Russia's annexation until October 2016, more than 8,800 Crimean residents received Ukrainian passports.

From the 2016 Russian legislative election onwards, the whole of Crimea has participated in elections to the Russian State Duma with the Republic of Crimea having 3 of the 225 constituencies: Simferopol constituency, Kerch constituency and Yevpatoria constituency.

=== Military ===
- Marine Corps of the Russia "little green men"
- Baherove (air base)
- Theodosius-13
- Southern Naval Base

=== Administrative divisions ===
The Republic of Crimea continues to use the administrative divisions previously used by the Autonomous Republic of Crimea before 2020, which is subdivided into 25 regions: 14 districts (raions) and 11 city municipalities (gorodskoj sovet or gorsovet), officially known as territories governed by city councils.

== Geography and demographics ==
Crimea's only land boundary is with Kherson region which is internationally recognised as part of Ukraine though Russia annexed it in September 2022. These crossings have been under the control of Russian troops since at least mid-March 2014.

Crimea has no land connection to Russia. In 2014–2019, Russia built the Crimean Bridge, a multibillion-dollar road–rail fixed link across the Kerch Strait. The link has been open for road traffic since 2018, and for rail traffic since 2019 (passenger) and 2020 (freight). During the 2022 Russian invasion of Ukraine it became an important logistical link for Russian forces. In October 2022 it was badly damaged by an explosion.

=== Life expectancy ===
According to the Russian occupation authorities, the best result in life expectancy the Republic of Crimea had in 2019, it reached 72.71 years. But during two years the COVID-19 pandemic the region had one of the largest summary fall in life expectancy in Russia, and in 2021 it became 69.70 years (65.31 for males and 73.96 for females)

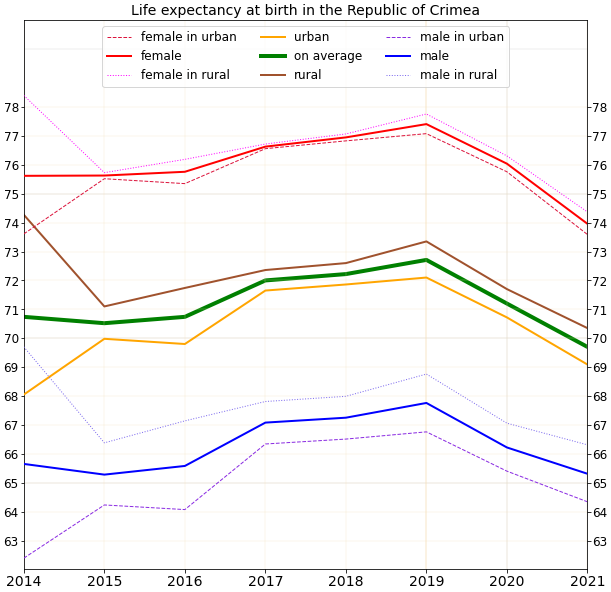
Life expectancy in the Republic of Crimea

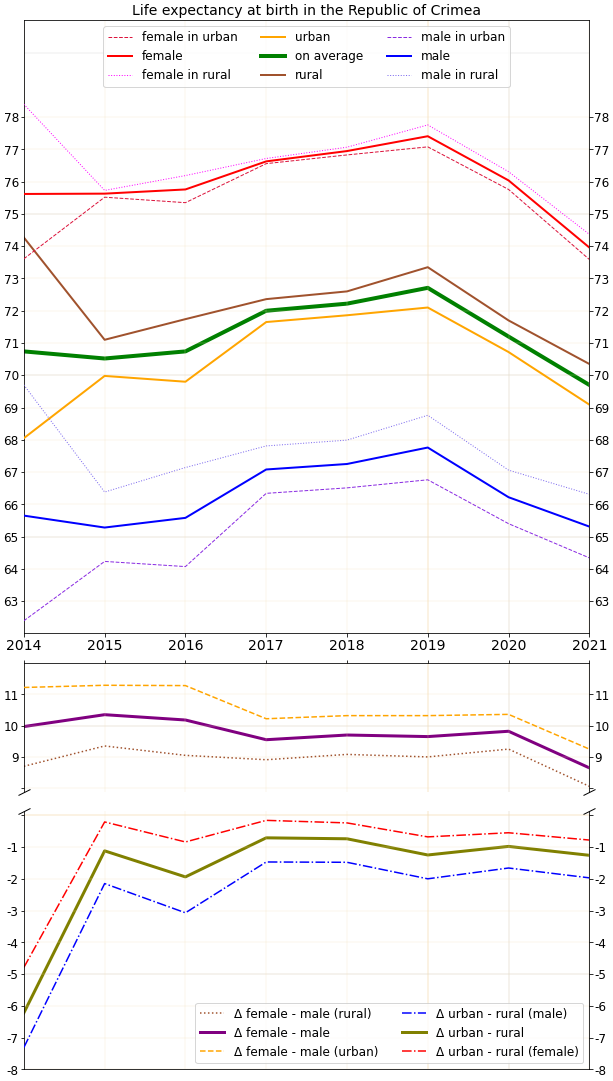
Life expectancy with calculated differences

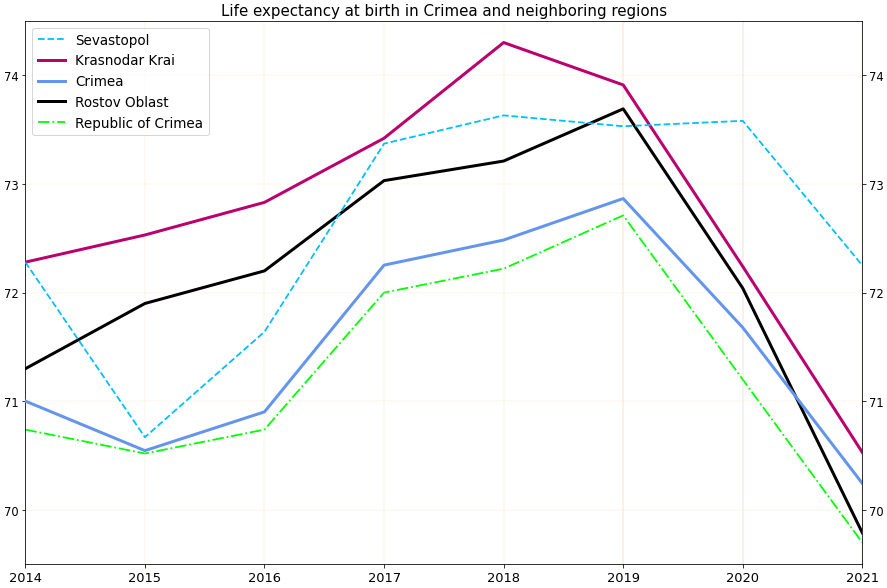
Life expectancy in the Republic of Crimea in comparison with Crimea on average and neighboring regions of the country

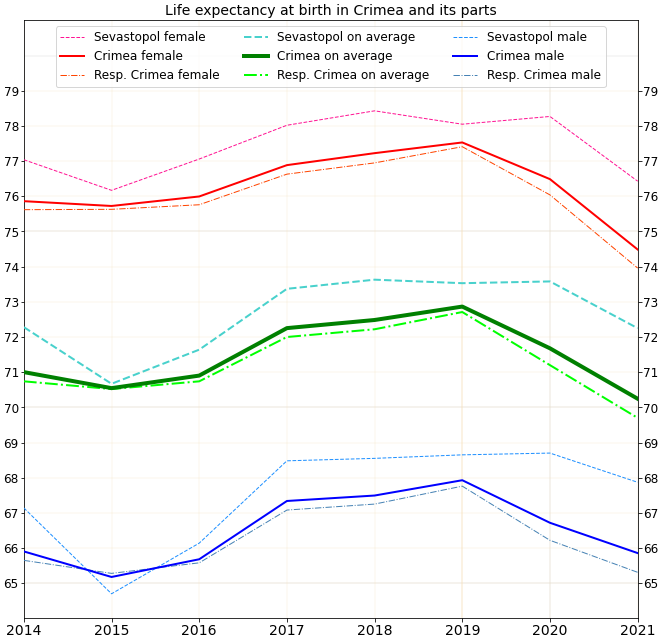
Life expectancy in the Republic of Crimea in comparison with Crimea on average (in detail)

=== Languages ===
According to the Constitution of the Republic of Crimea:

Article 10

1. Official languages of the Republic of Crimea are Russian, Ukrainian and Crimean Tatar.

According to the 2014 census by occupation authorities, 84% of Crimean inhabitants named Russian as their native language; 7.9% named Crimean Tatar; 3.7% Tatar and 3.3% Ukrainian. The previous census was held more than decade ago in 2001, when Crimea was still controlled by Ukraine.

According to the Republic of Crimea Ministry of Education, Science, and Youth, most primary and secondary school pupils have decided to study in Russian in 2015.

- In Russian – 96.74%
- In Crimean Tatar – 2.76%. 5083 pupils (+188 to 2014 year) study in Crimean Tatar language in 53 schools in 17 districts. 37 1st grade classes of primary school have been opened.
- In Ukrainian – 0.5%. 949 pupils study in Ukrainian language in 22 schools in 13 districts. 2 1st grade classes of primary school have been opened.

Its Education Minister Natalia Goncharova announced mid-August 2014 that (since no parents of first-graders wrote an application for learning Ukrainian) Crimea had decided not to form Ukrainian language classes in its primary schools. Goncharova said that since more than a quarter of parents at the Ukrainian gymnasium in Simferopol had written an application to teach children in Ukrainian; this school might have Ukrainian language classes. Goncharova also added that the parents of first-graders had written application for learning the Russian language, and (in areas inhabited by Crimean Tatars) for learning Crimean Tatar. Goncharova stated on 10 October 2014 that at that time Crimea had 20 schools where all subjects were conducted in Ukrainian.

A report (realised in the summer of 2015) of the Organization for Security and Cooperation in Europe (OSCE) stated that the Republic of Crimea had the aim to "end the teaching of Ukrainian" by "pressure on school administrations, teachers, parents, and children".

=== Religion ===
Religion in Crimea (2013)
1. Orthodox (58.0%)
2. Muslim (15.0%)
3. Belief without religion (10.0%)
4. Atheist (2.00%)
5. Other religion (2.00%)
6. Not stated (13.0%)

In 2013, before the Russian occupation, the majority of the Crimean population adhered to the Orthodox Church, with the Crimean Tatars forming a Sunni Muslim minority, besides smaller Roman Catholic, Ukrainian Greek Catholic, Armenian Apostolic and Jewish minorities. In 2013, Orthodox Christians made up 58% of the Crimean population, followed by Muslims (15%, mainly Tatars) and believers without religion (10%).

Since 2014, the United Nations has reported a regime of human-rights violations imposed by the Russian occupation authorities, including targeting religious minority groups and individuals.

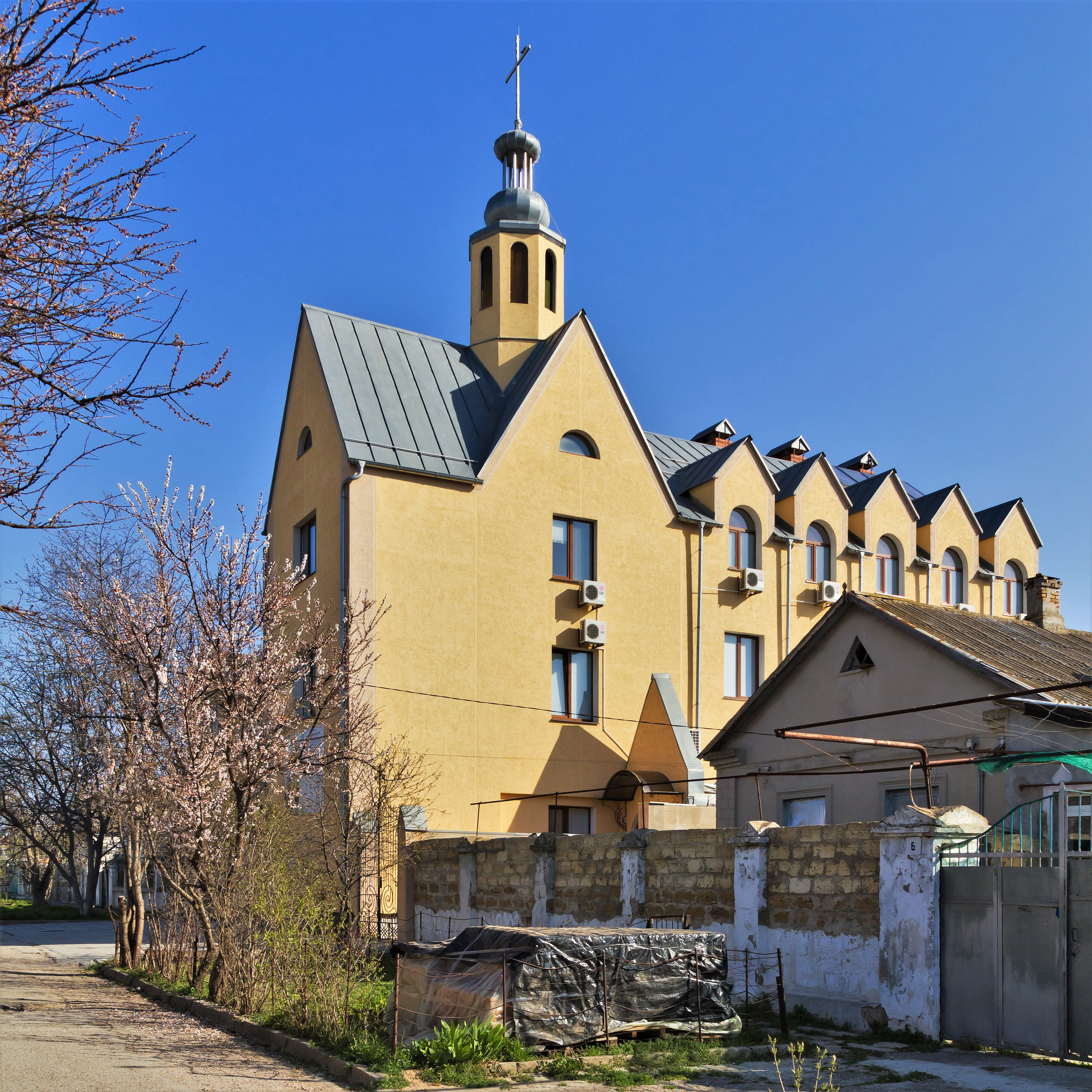
Catholic church in Yevpatoria

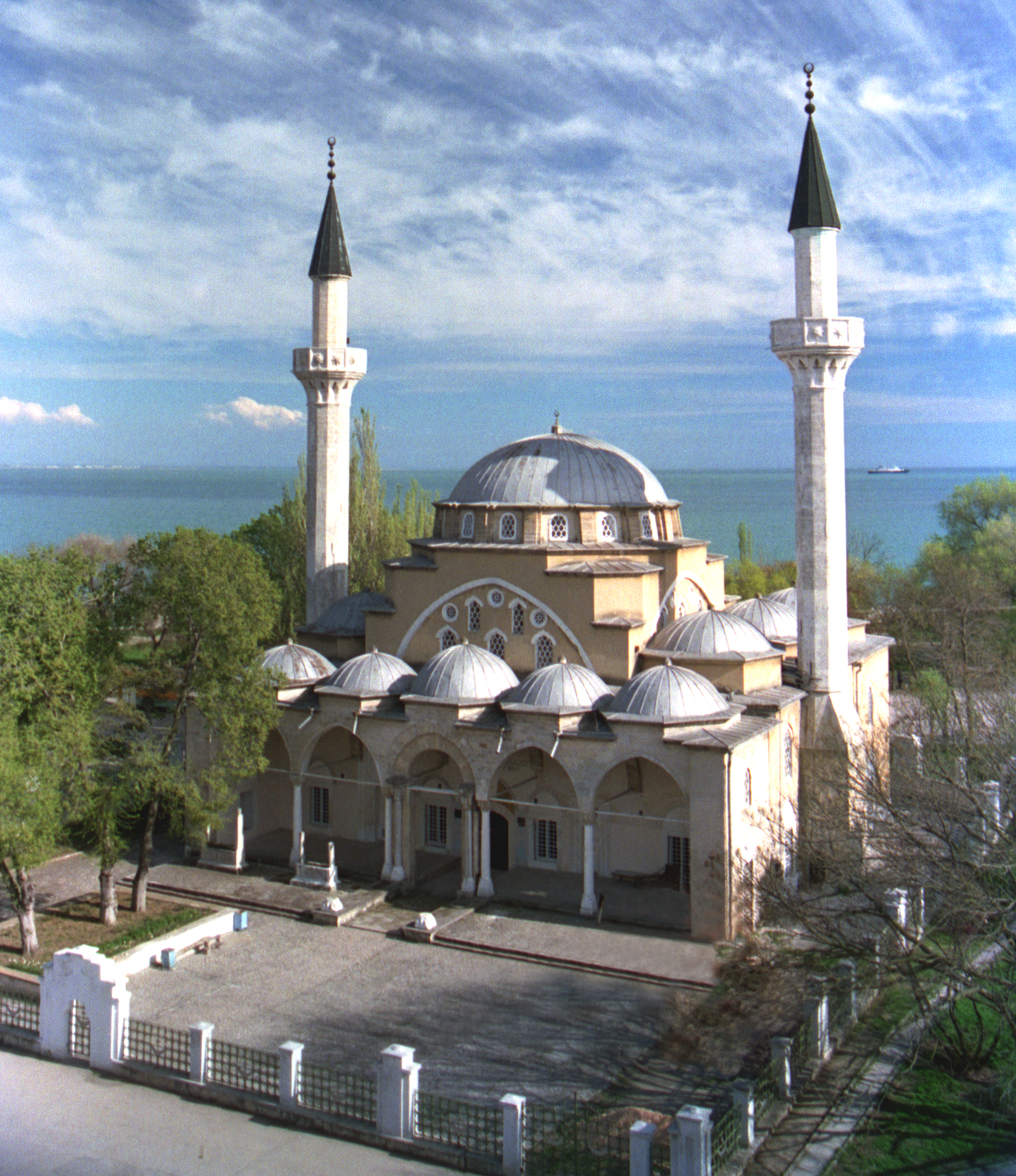
A Sunni mosque in Yevpatoria

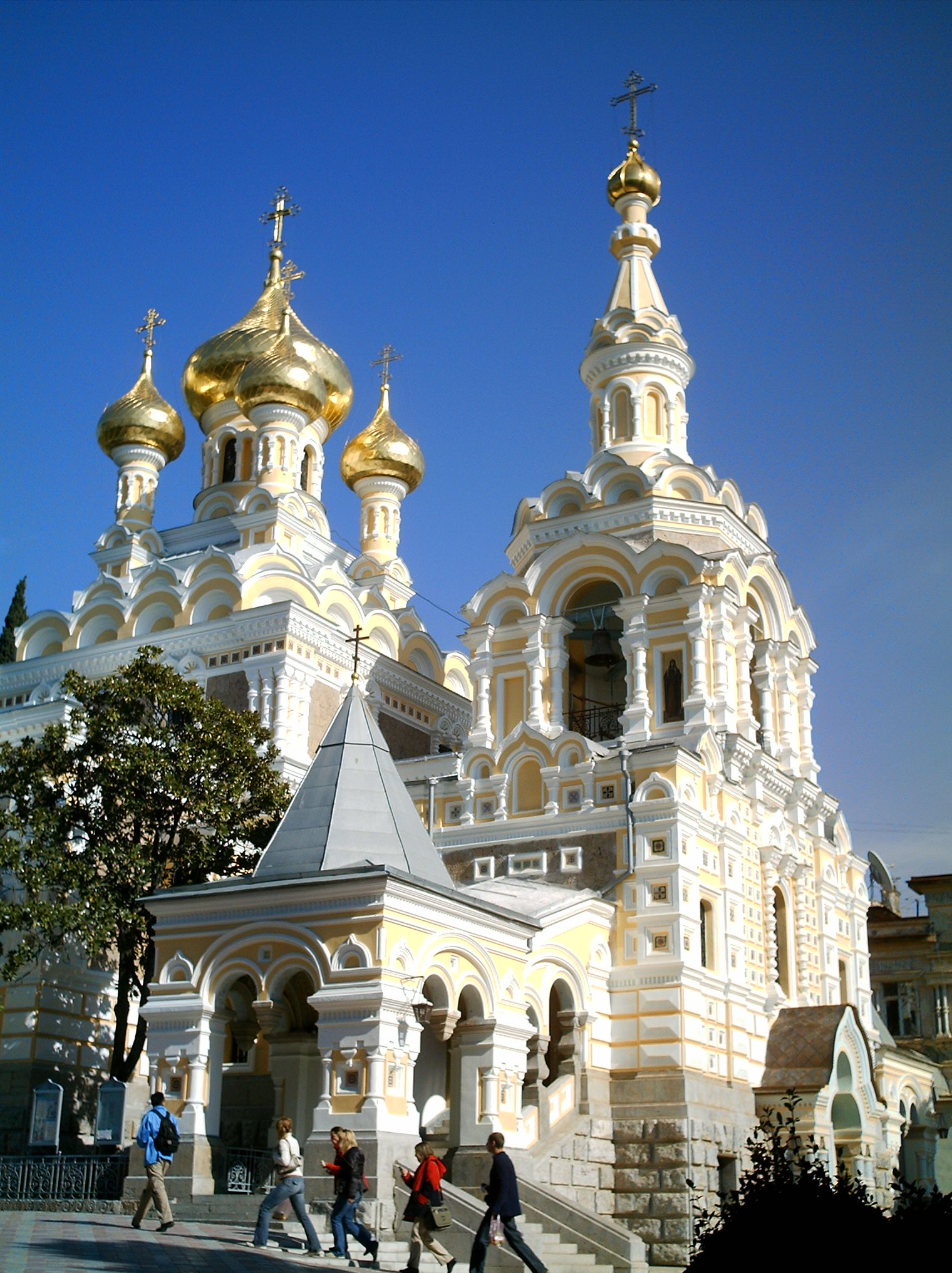
Orthodox church in Yalta

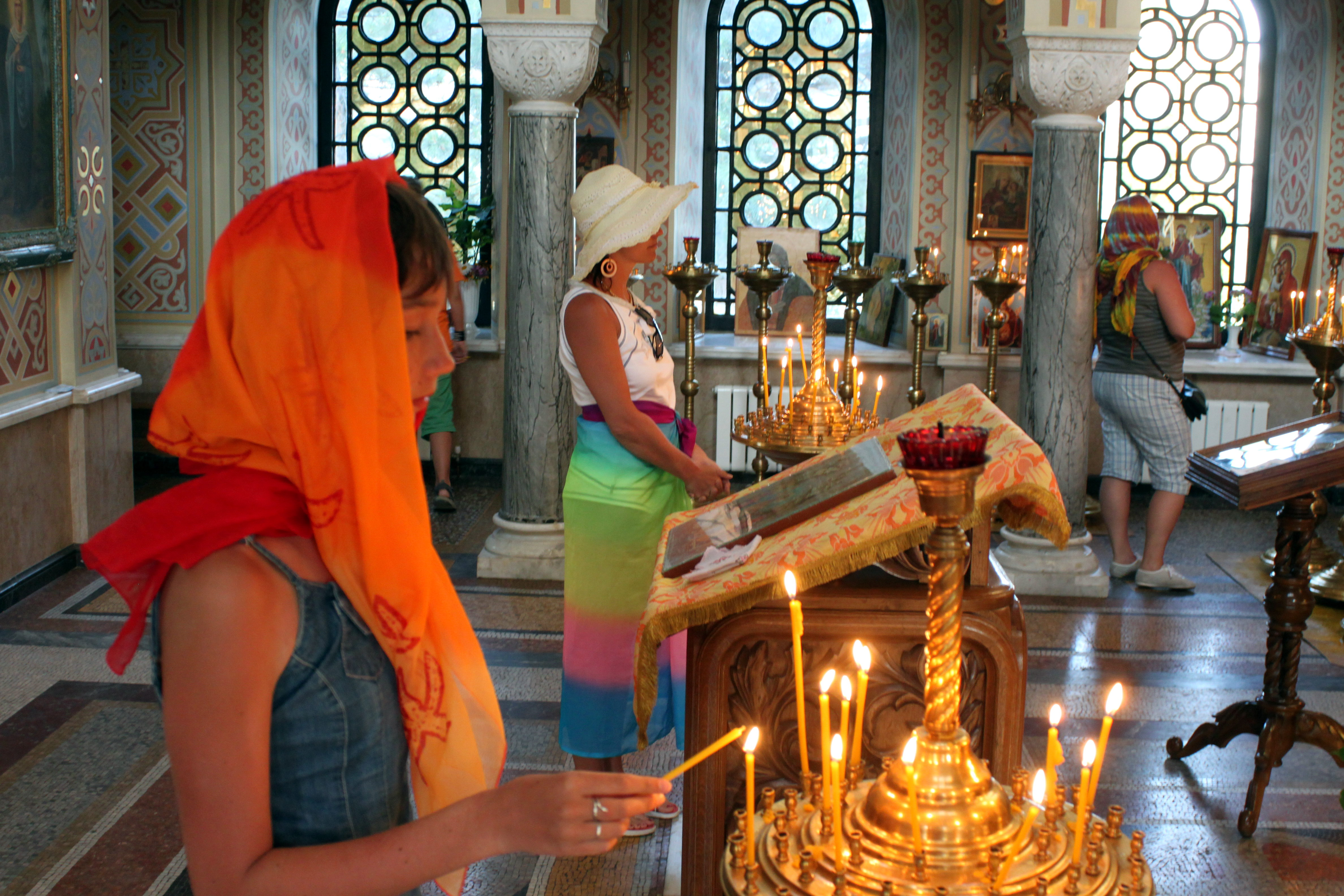
Interior of the Church of the Resurrection of Christ in Yalta

== Economy ==
Peninsula economy is based on tourism, agriculture (wines, fruits, wheat, rice and further crops), fishing, pearls, mining and natural resources (mainly iron, titanium, aluminium, manganese, calcite, sandstone, quartz and silicates, amethyst, other), metallurgical and steel industry, shipbuilding and repair, oil gas and petrochemical, chemical industry, electronics and devices machinery, instruments making, glass, electronics and electric parts devices, materials and building.

=== Overview ===
After annexation of the peninsula, Russia doubled payments to about 560,000 pensioners and 200,000 public workers (in Crimea). Those raises were cut back in April 2015.

In June 2015, The Economist estimated that the average salary in Crimea was about two-thirds of the average salary in Russia. According to Russian statistics by March 2015 the inflation in Crimea was 80%. According to the Crimean authorities local food prices have grown 2.5 times since Russia's annexation. Since then the peninsula now has to import most of its food from Russia.

After the annexation, Russian Crimean authorities started nationalization of what they called strategically important enterprises, which included not only transportation and energy production enterprises, but also, for example, a wine factory in Massandra. The enterprises which belonged to Russian citizens were nationalized against financial reimbursement, which was, however, much lower than the actual value; those which belonged to Ukrainian citizens, for example, PrivatBank owned by Ihor Kolomoyskyi or Ukrtelecom owned by Rinat Akhmetov, were expropriated without any reimbursement. The future of the nationalized enterprises is decided by the government. Reasons given for this were (among others) "the company helped to finance military operations against Donetsk People's Republic and Luhansk People's Republic" and "the resort complex illegally blocked public access to nearby park lands". The government can nationalise assets considered to have "particular social, cultural, or historical value". In the case of the Zalyv Shipbuilding yard, Crimean "self-defense" forces stormed the company's headquarters to demand nationalization. Head of the Republic Sergey Aksyonov claimed that in at least one case "Employees established control of the enterprise on their own, we just helped them a little". The nationalization of Ihor Kolomoyskyi's assets was, according to Aksyonov, "totally justified due to the fact that he is one of the initiators and financiers of the special anti-terrorist operation in the Eastern Ukraine where Russian citizens are being killed".

By late October 2014, 90% of the heads of Crimean government-owned corporation were fired as part of a supposed anti-corruption campaign, although no charges have been filed against anyone. Human rights activists in the region have described the seizures as lacking a legal basis and dismissed the "anti-corruption" rationale. In June 2015 the Federal Security Service (FSB) started several anti-corruption criminal cases against high ranking Crimean officials. According to Aksyonov the FSB had opened these criminal cases because it was "interested in destabilizing the situation in Crimea".

On 6 May 2014, the National Bank of Ukraine ordered Ukrainian banks to cease operations in Crimea; the following weeks the Central Bank of Russia closed all Ukrainian banks in the peninsula because "they had failed to meet their obligations to creditors". Eight months after the 21 March 2014 formal annexation of Crimea by Russia, it became impossible for clients of Ukrainian banks to access their deposits and most of them did not pay interest (on loans). A "Fund for the Protection of Depositors in Crimea", as part of Russia's Deposit Insurance Agency, was set up by Russia to compensate Crimeans. By 6 November 2014 it paid out more than $500 million to 196,400 depositors; the fund has a limit of about $15,000 per bank account. In July 2015, 25 banks were operating in Crimea while prior to the Russian annexation there were 180 banks.

While many international businesses left the region, in 2015 only a few Russian companies are reported to have invested in Crimea, fearing sanctions.

Under the international sanctions Crimea's once bustling IT-sector shrunk to a few IT companies.

Russia invests significantly in Crimea, according to "The Federal Target Program for the Development of the Republic of Crimea and Sevastopol" they plan to invest one trillion Russian rubles (15.3 billion dollars) before 2022 The Russian government claims that those investments are necessary because Ukrainian mismanagement of the Crimean territory caused losses of 2.5 trillion Russian rubles (38.3 billion dollars) to the Autonomous Republic of Crimea and Sevastopol Meanwhile, Ukraine estimates their losses due to Russian annexation of the peninsula to 100 billion dollars.

==== Banks ====
- JSC GENBANK
- JSC Bank CHBDR
- Russian National Commercial Bank

Gross regional product:

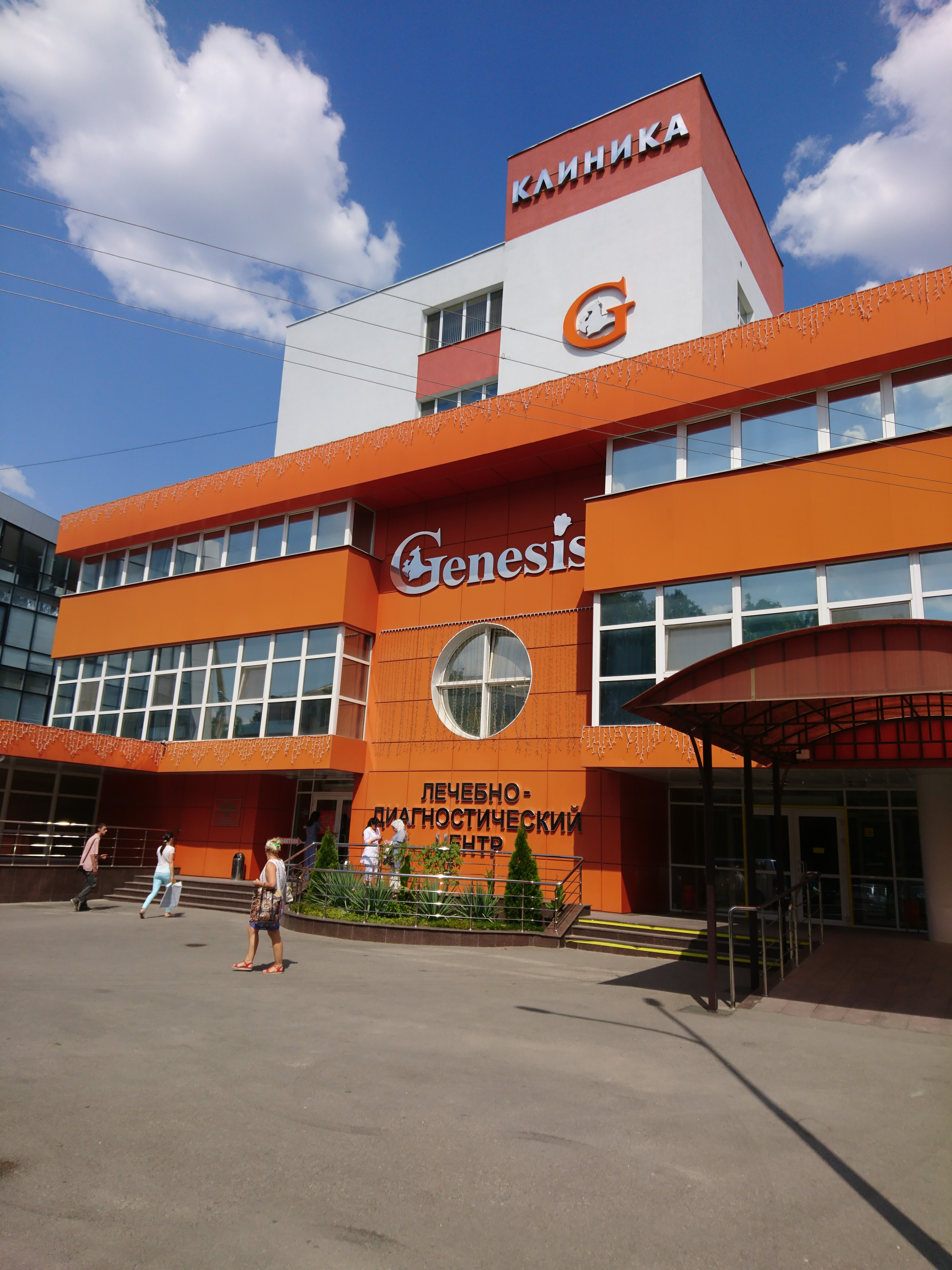
Commercial Medical Clinic in the Republic of Crimea

- Wholesale and retail trade, repair of motor vehicles, motorcycles, personal and household goods – 13%
- Transport and Telecom – 10%
- Real estate, renting and business activities – 10%
- Health care and social services – 10%
- Public administration, defense, compulsory social security – 8%
- Agriculture, hunting and forestry – 10%
- Other – 39%

=== Tourism ===
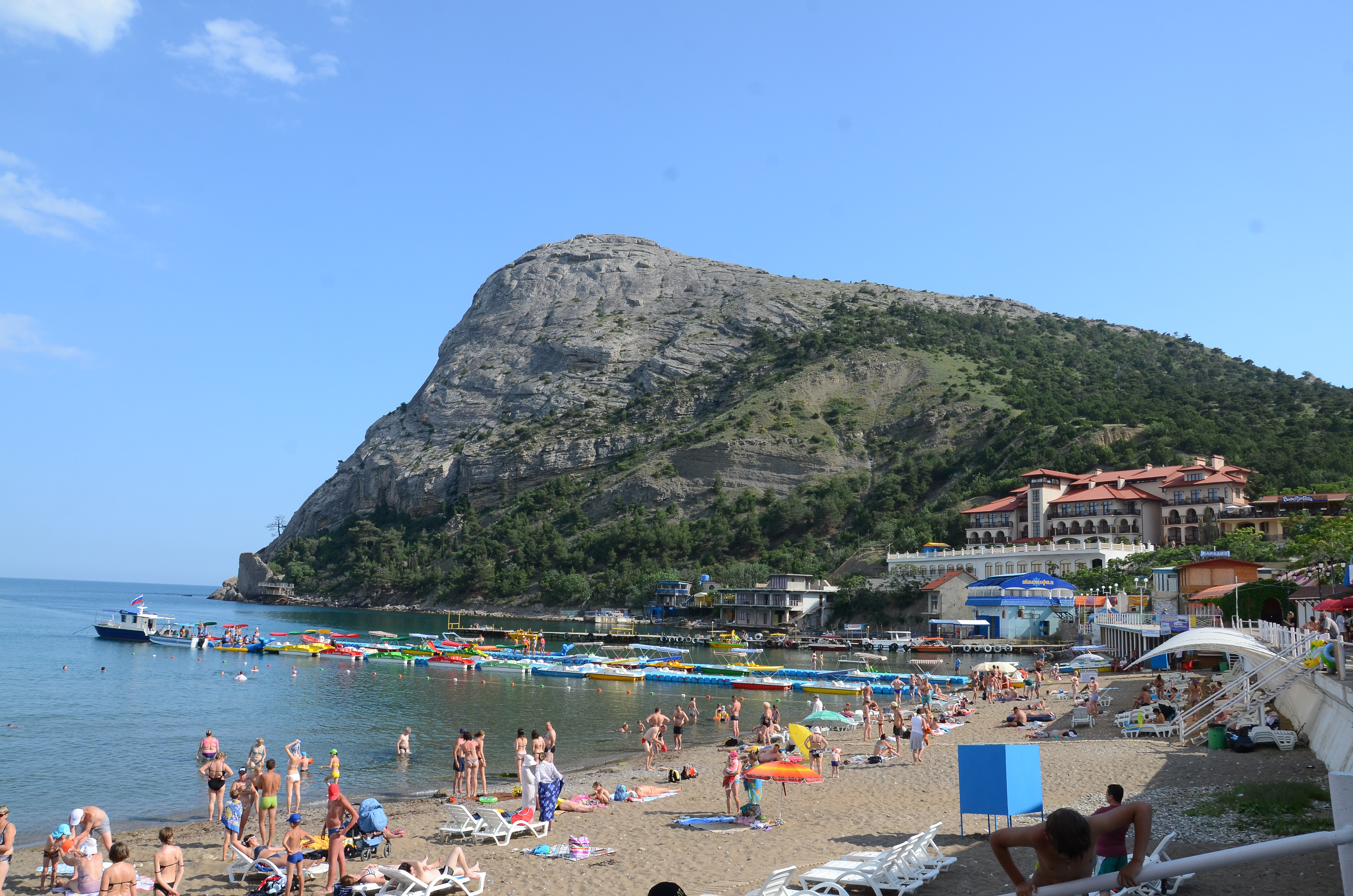
Tourists in Crimea in June 2015

In 2014 about two million tourists holidayed in Crimea, including 300,000 Ukrainians. In 2013 3.5 million Ukrainian and 1.5 million Russian tourists visited Crimea. Tourism is the mainstay of the Crimean economy. In August 2014 Head of the Republic Aksyonov was confident that in 2015 Crimea would welcome "at least five million visitors – I have no doubts about that". Early August 2015 the press service of his government stated that in 2015 2.02 million tourists had visited Crimea (16.5% more than in 2014). They stated in January 2016 (that in 2015) more than 4 million tourists had vacationed in the peninsula. Over 6.4 million tourists visited Crimea in 2018, according to occupation authorities. Some tourists went home after an airbase attack in August 2022. Crimean Bridge explosion also influenced the tourists.

=== Museums and art galleries ===
- Aivazovsky National Art Gallery
- Alexander Grin house museum
- Feodosia Money Museum
- Lapidarium, Kerch
- Livadia Palace
- Massandra Palace
- Simferopol Art Museum
- Museum of Vera Mukhina
- Vorontsov Palace (Alupka)
- White Dacha

=== Industrial Park ===
- Feodosia Industrial Park
- Bakhchysarai Industrial Park

== Telecommunication ==
The internet connection goes via Krasnodar Krai.

In Crimea Peninsula worked four mobile operators already offers voice and mobile data for 2G, 3G and 4G users.

== Transport ==
=== Aviation ===
Simferopol is an air transport hub of the Republic of Crimea.

- Simferopol International Airport

=== Rail ===
- Crimea Railway

=== Trolleybus Line ===
Crimean trolleybus line length of 86 kilometres (53 mi) long of service «Krymtrolleybus».

Routes: Airport Simferopol — Simferopol — Alushta — Yalta

=== Roads ===
- European route E105 – Syvash – Dzhankoy – North Crimean Canal – Simferopol – Alushta – Yalta
- Tavrida Highway A291: Kerch — Feodosia — Belogorsk — Simferopol — Bakhchisarai — Sevastopol.
- European route E97: Dzhankoy – Feodosiya – Kerch.
- Novorossiysk — Kerch highway A290: Crimean Bridge — Kerch
- Highway H19 (Ukraine) – Yalta – Sevastopol
- Highway M18 (Ukraine) – Yalta – Simferopol – Dzhankoy
- Highway H05 (Ukraine) – Simferopol – Simferopol International Airport – Krasnoperekopsk.

=== Water ===
- Kerch Strait ferry line (until 2020), Kerch–Yenikale Canal

== Education ==
Although Russian, Ukrainian and Crimean Tatar languages have official status, reports say that Ukrainian and Crimean Tatar education is being squeezed.

== Sport ==
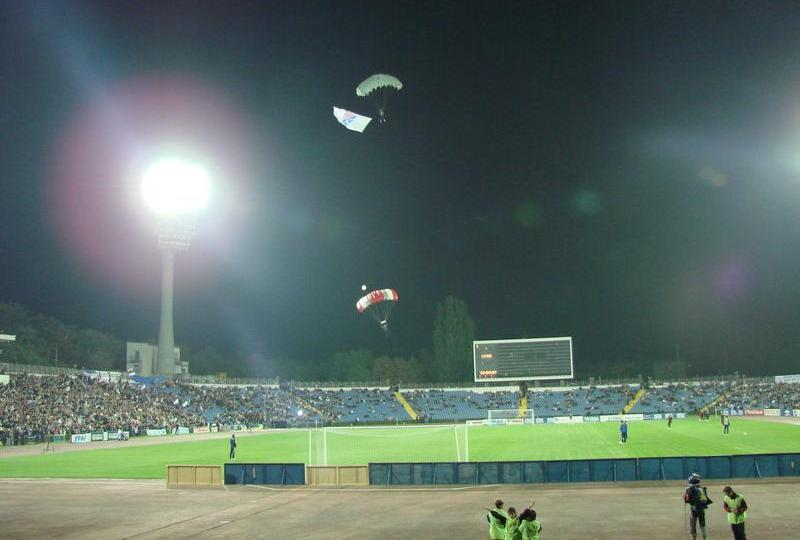
Lokomotiv Republican Sports Complex in Simferopol.

=== Football clubs ===
- FC Kyzyltash Bakhchisaray
- FC Rubin Yalta
- FC TSK Simferopol
- FC Krymteplytsia Molodizhne
- FC Ocean Kerch

== Human rights ==
United Nations monitors (who had been in Crimea from 2 April to 6 May 2014) said they were concerned about treatment of journalists, sexual, religious and ethnic minorities and AIDS patients. The monitors had found that journalists and activists who had opposed the 2014 Crimean referendum had been harassed and abducted. They also reported that Crimeans who had not applied for Russian citizenship faced harassment and intimidation. Russia said that it did not support the deployment of human rights monitors in Crimea. The (new) Crimean authorities vowed to investigate the reports of human rights violations.

According to Human Rights Watch "Russia has violated multiple obligations it has as an occupying power under international humanitarian law – in particular in relation to the protection of civilians' rights."

In its November 2014 report on Crimea, Human Rights Watch stated that "The de facto authorities in Crimea have limited free expression, restricted peaceful assembly, and intimidated and harassed those who have opposed Russia's actions in Crimea". According to the report, 15 persons went missing since March 2014; according to Ukrainian authorities 21 people disappeared. Head of the Republic Sergey Aksyonov pledged to find the missing persons as well as the culprits behind the kidnappings. Aksyonov regularly meets with a group of parents, whose children have gone missing, and human rights activists. These parents and human rights activists have complained that rotation of the team of investigators into these missing persons has harmed these investigations.

=== Crimean Tatars ===
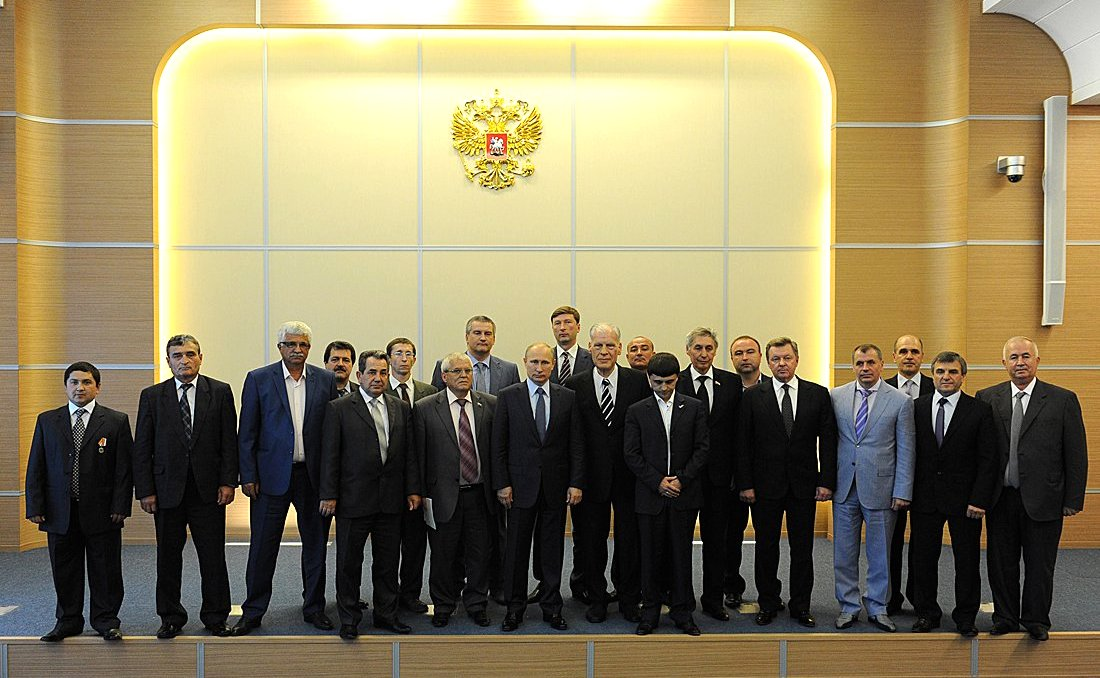
Vladimir Putin meeting with representatives of the Crimean Tatars, 16 May 2014

The Mejlis of the Crimean Tatar People has come under the scrutiny of the Russian Federal Security Service, which reportedly took control of the building where the Mejlis meets and searched it on 16 September 2014. Crimean Tatar media said FSB officers also searched the office of the Avdet newspaper, which is based inside the Mejlis building. Several members of the Mejlis were also reportedly subjected to FSB searches at their homes. Several Crimean Tatar opposition figures were banned from entering Crimea for five years. Since Russia annexed Crimea, several Crimean Tatars have disappeared or have been found dead after being reported missing. Crimean authorities state these deaths and disappearances are connected to "smoking an unspecified substance" and volunteers for the Syrian civil war; human rights activists claim the disappearances are part of a repression campaign against Crimean Tatars.

In February 2016, human rights defender Emir-Usein Kuku from Crimea was arrested and accused of belonging to the Islamist organization Hizb ut-Tahrir, although he denies any involvement in this organization. Amnesty International has called for his immediate liberation.

In May 2018, Server Mustafayev, the founder and coordinator of the human rights movement Crimean Solidarity, was imprisoned by Russian authorities and charged with "membership of a terrorist organisation". Amnesty International and Front Line Defenders demand his immediate release.

== International status ==
The status of the republic is disputed, as Russia and some other states recognised the annexation, whilst most other nations do not. Ukraine still considers both the Autonomous Republic and Sevastopol as subdivisions of Ukraine under Ukrainian territory and subject to Ukrainian law.

The United States, European Union, and Australia all claim to not issue visas to residents of Crimea with Russian passports. However, Russian media has claimed that several member states of the Schengen Area have issued visas to Crimeans with Russian passports.

On 21 March 2014, Armenia recognised the Crimean referendum, which led to Ukraine recalling its ambassador to that country. The unrecognized Nagorno-Karabakh Republic also recognised the referendum earlier that week on 17 March. On 22 March 2014, President Hamid Karzai of Afghanistan told a U.S. delegation that he recognised and supported the Crimean referendum and "respects the free will of the people of Crimea and Sevastopol to decide their own future". On 23 March 2014, Alexander Lukashenko, the President of Belarus stated that Crimea was de facto part of Russia, but the country did not officially recognise the Russian claim until November 2021. On 27 March 2014, Nicaragua unconditionally recognised the incorporation of Crimea into Russia.

Results of the United Nations General Assembly vote about the territorial integrity of Ukraine in March 2014. Note that Crimea is shown as part of Ukraine. In favour Against Abstentions Absent

On 27 March 2014, the UN General Assembly voted on a non-binding resolution claiming that the referendum was invalid and reaffirming Ukraine's territorial integrity, by a vote of 100 to 11, with 58 abstentions and 24 absent. Australia, Canada, Chile, France, Germany, Italy, Indonesia, Japan, Mexico, United Kingdom, United States and 89 other countries voted for; Armenia, Belarus, Bolivia, Cuba, North Korea, Nicaragua, Sudan, Syria, Venezuela and Zimbabwe, as well as Russia, voted against. Among the abstaining countries were China, India, Pakistan, South Africa and Brazil. Israel was among the countries listed as absent. Reuters reported unnamed UN diplomats saying the Russian delegation threatened with punitive action against certain Eastern European and Central Asian countries if they supported the resolution. Subsequent United Nations General Assembly resolutions also reaffirmed non-recognition of the annexation and condemned "the temporary occupation of part of the territory of Ukraine—the Autonomous Republic of Crimea and the city of Sevastopol".

== See also ==
- Annexation of the Crimean Khanate by the Russian Empire
- Autonomous Republic of Crimea
- Crimea in the Soviet Union
- Russian occupation of Crimea
- Russian annexation of Donetsk, Kherson, Luhansk and Zaporizhzhia oblasts
  - Donetsk People's Republic
  - Luhansk People's Republic
  - Russian occupation of Kharkiv Oblast
  - Russian occupation of Kherson Oblast
  - Russian occupation of Mykolaiv Oblast
  - Russian occupation of Zaporizhzhia Oblast
