= Yury Gotsanyuk =

Crimean politician (born 1966)

- Юрий Гоцанюк
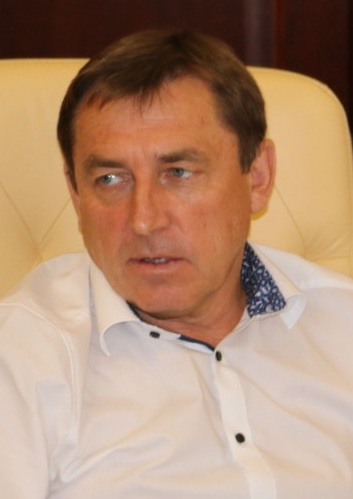
- Gotsanyuk in 2019

Prime Minister of Crimea
- Incumbent
- Assumed office 19 September 2019
- Preceded by: Sergey Aksyonov

Personal details
- Born: Yury Mikhailovich Gotsanyuk; 18 July 1966 (age 60) Nova Derevnia, Crimean Oblast, Ukrainian SSR, Soviet Union

Yury Mikhailovich Gotsanyuk (Russian: Юрий Михайлович Гоцанюк, Ukrainian: Юрій Михайлович Гоцанюк, romanized: Yuriy Mykhaylovych Hotsaniuk; born 18 July 1966) is a Russian politician who has been Prime Minister of Crimea since 2019.

== Early life and education ==
Yury Mikhailovich Gotsanyuk was born in Nova Derevnia, Crimean Oblast, Ukrainian SSR, Soviet Union, on 18 July 1966. He graduated from the Crimean Agrotechnological University in 1996, and the National Academy for Public Administration in 2007.

== Career ==
Gotsanyuk served in the Soviet Army from 1984 to 1986, and was a tractor driver at a collective farm in the Pervomaiske Raion from 1987 to 1990. At a collective farm he was an agronomist from 1990 to 1993, a manager from 1993 to 1995, and chief agronomist from 1995 to 2000. UNIS and K, an agricultural production cooperative, was chaired by Gotsanyuk from 2000 to 2003.

Gotsanyuk was deputy chair of the Pervomaiske Raion from 2003 to 2006, and chair of the district council from 2006 to 2013. From 2013 to 2014, he was chair of the Nyzhnohirskyi Raion.

Crimea was annexed by Russia in 2014. He was the acting head of the Pervomaiske Raion from October to December 2014, and then head from December 2014 to 19 August 2016. He became deputy chair of the Council of Ministers of Crimea on 24 August 2016, and then chair on 2 October 2019.

Sergey Aksyonov nominated Gotsanyuk as Prime Minister of Crimea in 2019, and the council of ministers approved his nomination. Gotsanyuk was sanctioned by the United States and United Kingdom in 2020 in relation to the Russo-Ukrainian War.

== Personal life ==
Gotsanyuk is married.

== Works cited ==
=== News ===
- "Премьер-министром Крыма стал Юрий Гоцанюк". Kommersant. 1 October 2019. Archived from the original on 1 October 2019.

=== Web ===
- "Юрий Михайлович". Republic of Crimea.
- "Treasury Sanctions Illegitimate Russian-Backed Crimean Officials and Railroad Company Linking Crimea to Russia". United States Department of the Treasury. 29 January 2020. Archived from the original on 5 July 2025.
