= Council of Ministers of Crimea =

Former subnational governmental body in Ukraine

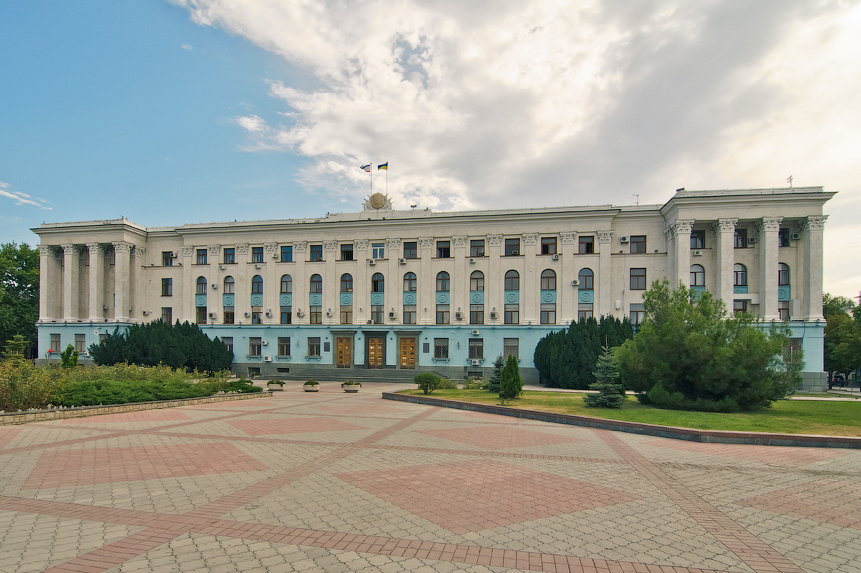
Building of Council of Ministers of Crimea

The Council of Ministers of the Autonomous Republic of Crimea (Ukrainian: Рада міністрів Автономної Республіки Крим; Russian: Совет министров Автономной Республики Крым), briefly SovMin, is the executive branch of government of the Autonomous Republic of Crimea, a republic within southern Ukraine that is currently suspended due to Russian occupation of the Crimean Peninsula since February 27, 2014. The Council of Ministers derived its authority from the Constitution and laws of Ukraine and normative acts of the Verkhovna Rada of Crimea which bring them into its competency.

The Chairman, who is appointed by the Verkhovna Rada (parliament) with approval of the President of Ukraine, headed the cabinet.

On 27 February 2014, during the 2014 Russian aggression against Ukraine, masked gunmen seized the building of the Council of Ministers and members of the Council. Under siege, the Supreme Council of Crimea, chaired by Vladimir Konstantinov, passed a motion of no confidence in the Council of Ministers of Crimea and adopted a resolution to terminate its powers. The parliament dismissed the chairman of the Crimean Council of Ministers Anatolii Mohyliov, and replaced him with a pro-Russian deputy Sergey Aksyonov, who was proclaimed the de facto leader by the ousted president Victor Yanukovych. The ensuing interim Crimean Parliament promptly scheduled a referendum on the independence of Crimea to be held on March 16, 2014.

== History ==
The Council of Ministers of Crimea was formed March 22, 1991 in connection with the re-creation of the USSR as part of the Crimean Autonomous Republic, by converting the executive committee of the Crimean regional council. In the years 1994–1997 the highest executive body of the Crimean autonomy of Crimea was called by the Government, with the February 3, 1997 – Council of Ministers of the Autonomous Republic of Crimea.

February 27, 2014 the Supreme Council of the Autonomous Republic of Crimea adopted a decision on "vote of no confidence to the Council of Ministers of Crimea and the termination of its activities", after which the then Prime Minister of Crimea, Anatolii Mohyliov, was dismissed, and the existing body appointed Sergey Aksenov. There was a total of 63 votes, 60 of which being in favor of the dissolution, with 0 against and 3 abstained from voting. Various media accounts have disputed whether there was a quorum of 50 deputies before the session convened that day, and some Crimean legislators who were registered as present have said they did not come near the building.

March 6, 2014 the Supreme Council of the Autonomous Republic of Crimea has decided to amend the system and structure of executive bodies. In accordance with the decree, republican authorities formed by the Supreme Council of Crimea by the Chairman of the Council of Ministers of Crimea, and appointment and dismissal of the heads of national authorities carried out the Crimean Parliament in accordance with the Constitution of the Autonomic Republic of Crimea.

March 17, 2014, based on the results of the referendum and adopted the All-Crimean March 11 Declaration of Independence was proclaimed an independent and sovereign Republic of Crimea. On the same day in accordance with the decision of the Crimean Parliament "On the official names of the authorities of the Republic of Crimea and other bodies" executive authority of the State is called the Council of Ministers of the Republic of Crimea.

After the adoption of the Crimean Republic of the Russian Federation 18 March 2014 the Council of Ministers of the Republic of Crimea has been transformed into an executive authority of the Russian Federation.

According to the Constitution of the Republic of Crimea, approved April 11, 2014, the Council of Ministers of Crimea headed directly or Head of the Republic of Crimea – the highest official of the Republic (in order to combine with the office of the Prime Minister) – Chairman of the Board or of Ministers appointed by the head of the Republic of Crimea with the consent of the State Council . Currently in force government was formed February 28, 2014.

On April 11, 2014 the Council of Ministers decided to establish the Ministry of Construction and Architecture of the Crimea to replace the existing National Committee for Construction and Architecture. Appointed minister Vladimir Nikolov.

== Powers and responsibilities ==
In accordance with Article 83 of the Constitution of the Republic of Crimea, the Council of Ministers of the Republic:

- Develop and implement measures to ensure an integrated socio-economic development of the Republic of Crimea;
- Provides within its powers the unified state policy in the field of finance, science, education, culture, health, physical culture and sports, social security, road safety and ecology;
- Carries within its authority measures for the implementation, maintenance and protection of the rights and freedoms of citizens, protect property and public order, fighting terrorism and extremism, and crime;
- Carries within its authority measures to ensure state guarantees the equality of rights, freedoms and legitimate interests of citizens regardless of race, nationality, language, religion, and other circumstances; prevent restriction of rights and discrimination on grounds of social, racial, national, linguistic or religious affiliation; preservation and development of ethnic and cultural diversity of the peoples of the Russian Federation, residing in the territory of the Republic of Crimea, their languages and cultures; Protection of National Minorities;
- Social and cultural integration of migrants; the prevention of interethnic (ethnic) conflict and the promotion of inter-ethnic and inter-religious harmony;
- Developed to represent the Head of the Republic of Crimea to the State Council of the Republic of Crimea draft budget of the Republic of Crimea and projects of socio-economic development of the Republic of Crimea;
- Ensures the implementation of the budget of the Republic of Crimea, is preparing a report on its implementation, as well as reports on the implementation of socio-economic development of the Republic of Crimea;
- Forms other executive bodies of the Republic of Crimea;
- Manages and disposes of the property of the Republic of Crimea in accordance with the laws of the Republic of Crimea, and manages federal property transferred Republic of Crimea in the management in accordance with federal laws and other normative legal acts of the Russian Federation;
- Holds the right to offer the local government body, elected or other official of local government to align with the legislation of the Russian Federation issued their legal acts if these acts contradict the Constitution of the Russian Federation, federal laws and other normative legal acts of the Russian Federation, the Constitution, laws and other normative legal acts of the Republic of Crimea, as well as the right to appeal these acts in a judicial order;
- Exercise other powers established by federal laws, the Constitution and laws of the Republic of Crimea, as well as agreements with the federal executive authorities, concluded in accordance with Article 78 of the Constitution of the Russian Federation.

In the limits of the powers of the government of the republic, they are binding on all its territory. Decisions and orders of the Council of Ministers of the Republic of Crimea shall not contradict the Constitution and laws of the Russian Federation and the Republic of Crimea, as well as decrees of the President of the Russian Federation and the Russian Federation Government Resolution.

== Composition during the annexation ==
Composition was disputed as none of the appointments were approved by the President of Ukraine, while voting for the new council is challenged by the Ukrainian parliament.

- Chairman – Sergey Aksyonov
- First Deputy – Rustam Temirgaliev
- Minister of Information – Dmitry Polonsky
- Minister of Defense – Valery Kuznetsov

== Dissolved Council ==
- Chairman – Anatolii Mohyliov
- First Deputy Chairman – Pavlo Burlakov
- Deputy Chairman/Minister of Economical Development and Trade – Kateryna Yurchenko
- Deputy Chairman/Minister of Resorts and Tourism – Heorhiy Psarev
- Deputy Chairman/Minister of Regional Development and Communal Living – Aziz Abdullayev
- Head of Office of Sovmin Affairs – Olha Udovina
- Minister of Finance – Mykola Skoryk
- Minister of Culture – Olena Plakida
- Minister of Agrarian Policy and Food – Valeriy Kravets
- Minister of Social Policy – Yelena Semichastna
- Minister of Education and Science, Youth and Sport – Vitalina Dzoz
- Minister of Healthcare – Ihor Shpak

== Previous Chairmen of Republican Committees ==
- In transportation and communication – Mykola Cherevkov
- In fuel, energy and innovation policy – Ihor Zosimov
- In land resources – Oleksandr Chabanov
- In construction – Andriy Lyashevsky
- In inter-ethnic relationships – Eduard Dudakov
- In protection of Cultural Heritage – Serhiy Tur
- In water management construction and land improvement – Ihor Vail
- In information – Vadym Volchenko
- In protection of Natural Environment – Yevhen Bubnov
- In forestry and hunting – Ihor Katsai

== Others ==
- Chief of MVS in Crimea is the Deputy Minister of Ministry of Internal Affairs of Ukraine
