= Constitution of the Republic of Crimea =

Supreme law of the Republic of Crimea, Russia

- Ratified: 11 April 2014 (Crimea)
- Purpose: Establishing Crimean status within Russia

The Constitution of the Republic of Crimea is the basic law of the Republic of Crimea as a claimed federal subject of Russia formed in the aftermath of the annexation of Crimea by the Russian Federation. It was ratified on 11 April 2014. Its purpose is to replace the Constitution of the Autonomous Republic of Crimea based on the premise that it was repealed by a referendum during the 2014 Crimean crisis. The Ukrainian government and the majority of the international community do not recognize the annexation of Crimea by Russia and regard the Constitution of the Autonomous Republic of Crimea as active.

== History ==
In March 2014, following the takeover of Crimea by pro-Russian separatists and Russian Armed Forces, a controversial referendum was held on the issue of reunification with Russia; the official result was that a large majority wished to join with Russia. Russia then annexed the Republic of Crimea and Sevastopol as federal subjects of Russia. The new Constitution was passed by Crimea's parliament on 11 April 2014.
