= Politics of Crimea =

The politics of Crimea today is that of the Republic of Crimea on one hand, and that of the federal city of Sevastopol on the other, within the context of the largely unrecognised annexation of Crimea by the Russian Federation in March 2014.

== Background ==
From 1991 to 2014, the politics of Crimea had been that of the Autonomous Republic of Crimea and of Sevastopol. However, following the ousting of the Ukrainian president Viktor Yanukovych during the Revolution of Dignity, Russia invaded Crimea. Following the Russian takeover, a referendum in Crimea on whether it should be independent or rejoin Russia was organized (unrecognized by most of the world, the referendum did not offer the option to stay within Ukraine). Days after the official results showed overwhelming support for the proposal, Russia signed a Treaty of Accession with the self-declared independent Republic of Crimea that annexed Crimea to the Russian Federation as two federal subjects.

While the Russian Federation both claims and administers the Republic of Crimea and the city of Sevastopol as two of its federal subjects, Ukraine continues to claim Crimea as integral part of its territory.

== Institutions ==
The Constitution of the Republic of Crimea is the basic law of the Republic of Crimea within the Russian Federation. It was ratified on 11 April 2014 and, de facto, replaced the previous Constitution of the Autonomous Republic of Crimea that was repealed by the Crimean status referendum. The Russian constitution was updated to list the Republic of Crimea and Sevastopol as the 84th and 85th Federal Subjects of the Russian Federation.

=== Parliament of Crimea ===
The 75-seat State Council of Crimea is the legislative branch of the Republic of Crimea. Elections are conducted under a system of mixed-member proportional representation, with 25 single-member constituencies and 50 seats filled through party-list PR. At the 2014 Crimean parliamentary election, United Russia won 70 seats, including all 25 single-member constituencies, with the Liberal Democratic Party of Russia winning 5 seats.

Before 2014, the 100-seat legislative branch of the Autonomous Republic of Crimea was called the Supreme Council of Crimea. This parliament had no right of legislative initiative. It was responsible for appointing the Council of Ministers. Following the decision of the Ukrainian parliament to dissolve the supreme council of Crimea in March 2014, the Supreme Council decided to rename itself as the State Council of Crimea, and to continue as the parliament of Crimea.

=== Government of Crimea ===
The Head of the Republic of Crimea is the highest office holder within the Republic of Crimea. This position replaced the post of Prime Minister of Crimea which is the head of the Council of Ministers according to the Constitution of the Autonomous Republic of Crimea.

After Russia's 2014 annexation most Crimean public officials weren't replaced.

=== Judiciary ===
The Judiciary is independent of the executive and the legislature branches and the responsibility of the national authorities.

In Russia, for serious and specific crimes (murder, kidnapping, rape with aggravating circumstances, child trafficking, gangsterism, large-scale bribery, treason, terrorism, public calls for violent change in the constitutional system or for the seizure of power, and select other crimes against the state), the accused have the option of a jury trial consisting of 12 jurors, who must be 25 years old, legally competent, and without a criminal record. In Ukraine, "jury trials" have 2 judges and 3 jurors, but there is confusion over whether or not these are jurors or lay judges. Russian juries are similar to common law juries, and unlike lay judges, in that they sit separately from the judges and decide questions of fact alone while the judge determines questions of law. (Russia used jury trials from 1864 to 1917, reintroduced the jury trial in 1993, and extended it to another 69 regions in 2003; Ukraine's first "jury trial" ended in October 2013 in Sumy).

=== Administrative divisions ===
The Republic of Crimea, just as the Autonomous Republic of Crimea, is subdivided into a total of 25 regions: 14 raions (districts) and 11 city municipalities. Though the City of Sevastopol is located on the Crimean peninsula, it is administratively separately from the Republic of Crimea as a federal city. The capital of the Republic of Crimea is the City of Simferopol, located in the interior of the peninsula.

== Elections and referendums ==
=== Under Soviet supervision ===
- 1991 Crimean sovereignty referendum

=== Under Ukrainian supervision ===
- 1994 Crimean referendum
- 1994 Crimean presidential election
- 1994 Crimean parliamentary election
- 1998 Crimean parliamentary election
- 2002 Crimean parliamentary election
- 2006 Crimean parliamentary election
- 2010 Crimean parliamentary election

=== Under Russian supervision ===
- 2014 Crimean status referendum
- 2014 Crimean parliamentary election
- 2016 Russian legislative election
- 2019 Crimean parliamentary election
- 2021 Russian legislative election
- 2024 Crimean parliamentary election
- 2026 Russian legislative election

== See also ==
- Political status of Crimea
- Annexation of Crimea by the Russian Federation
