= Lev Mirimsky =

Ukrainian politician and businessman (1960–2017)

- Лев Миримський
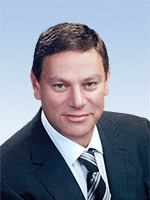
- An official portrait of him from 2012.

People's Deputy of Ukraine
- In office 27 March 1994 – 25 May 2006
- In office 28 October 2012 – 27 November 2014

Deputy of the Verkhovna Rada of Crimea
- In office September 2002 – 2003
- In office 2006–2012

Personal details
- Born: Lev Yuliyovych Mirimsky; 2 April 1960 Simferopol, Ukrainian SSR, Soviet Union
- Died: 27 April 2017 (aged 53) Kyiv, Ukraine
- Party: For United Ukraine! Labour Ukraine; Soyuz
- Education: Simferopol Technical School of Railway Transport; Moscow University of Management and Commerce; National Academy for Public Administration

Lev Yuliyovych Mirimsky (Ukrainian: Лев Юлійович Миримський; Russian: Лев Юльевич Миримский; 2 April 1960-27 April 2017) was a Ukrainian politician and businessman who served as a People's Deputy of Ukraine from 1994 to 2006 and again from 2012 to 2014, representing the 2nd, 3rd, 4th, and 7th convocations of the Verkhovna Rada. Mirimsky also served as a Deputy of the Verkhovna Rada of Crimea from 2002 to 2003 and again from 2006 to 2012. In addition, as the founder and leader of Soyuz, a pro-Russian and Crimean regionalist party, he was a longtime and prominent figure in Crimean politics, specifically in his native city of Simferopol. However, Mirimsky would ultimately oppose the 2014 Russian annexation of Crimea, despite past statements in support of a Union State with Russia and Belarus. Following the annexation, he left politics in Crimea and moved to Kyiv. In addition to his political career, Mirimsky was also the founder and director of Imperiya, a multi-sector business group that owned numerous enterprises within Crimea.

== Early life ==
Mirimsky was born on 2 April 1960 in the city of Simferopol, which was then part of the Ukrainian SSR in the Soviet Union. He was ethnically Jewish and was born into a family of employees. After graduating from secondary school, he pursued higher education, attending the Simferopol Technical School of Railway Transport in his hometown until 1979, when he graduated with a specialisation as a road technician. After graduation, he did his mandatory military service in the Soviet Army until 1981. In the army, he worked as a volunteer photographer in exchange for items. Upon his return to Crimea in 1981, he started working as a construction technician for the Municipal Public Services Complex of the city of Simferopol until 1983. He also began to produce and sell jewelry as a side job. For a year, until 1984, he then worked as a construction technician within the Food and Trade Department of the Kyivskyi District of Simferopol. He returned to his old job from 1981 in 1984, which he did until 1987.

In 1995, he also graduated from the Crimean branch of the Moscow University of Management and Commerce with a specialisation in economics. He followed this up in 2001 by graduating from the National Academy for Public Administration, where he received a Master's degree in public administration.

== Business career ==
In 1987, he founded and was director of the cooperative "Progress" in Simferopol. He later founded and directed "Leko", which was also based in the city. In 1993, he merged these two businesses to form the corporation "Imperiya", which he led. Imperiya was a multi-sector corporation that was involved in rental property, tourism, and an internet provider company, among other things. As of 2012, Imperiya holds LLC Fantaziya, the Restra insurance company, Grantor, Artrium (together with Valeriy Kudashev), and the car dealer Avtodel in Crimea. He also co-founded the following enterprises within Crimea: Krymtrikotazh, Kirov canning plant, Universal Bank of Development and Partnership, advertising association of Crimea, ITV, Business-Express, Krymskoe vremya, the travel agency Terra Tavrika, and the telecom company Optima Telecom-Crimea. He also later founded the commercial regional bank Aksi-Bank, which was either self-liquidated or, according to Mirimsky in interviews, was seized by then Crimean police chief Hennadiy Moskal after he accused it of being involved in organised crime.

Imperiya was also involved in operating the underpasses in Simferopol after he accused the city of not taking care of them, and also being retail pavilions around them. This practice first began in 1990, although eventually the city took over and tasked the communal enterprise with doing this task. Imperiya also ran a few public toilets around the city, and bought out land and buildings around Simferopol. Eventually, Mirimsky claimed he no longer worked with Imperiya, and that his wife handled the business while he handled politics. His wife was also in charge of the "MTS" company, although that was sold off in 2012 prior to the elections. However, Mirimsky at the same time also said his stake was sold under an attorney in 2012 without his involvement, and that it possibly went to Viktor Ageev. After 2014, Mirimsky kept doing his business in Crimea, traveling between there and Kyiv, after he retired from politics. He also allegedly offered to lease the North Crimean Canal and take over payments under the new authorities, although Boris Lozhkin declined, calling it a political issue.

=== Alleged ties with criminal organisations ===
Mirimsky was continuously accused during his career of having alleged ties to organised crime, although he consistently denied the claims and said they only came up during election seasons as a way to discredit him. Argument accused him of being closely tied to the regional gang "Bashmaki", and that he was the financier of it and gave legal aid to members of the gang through Soyuz, and that he was nicknamed "Leon Killer" for this. A commonly cited piece of evidence was Mirimsky being present at the birthday of Sergey Voronkov in 1994 and presenting him a present there. Voronkov was linked to the "Seilem" gang and was imprisoned from 2001 to 2008, but was later pardoned and eventually headed the boxing federation of Crimea. Mirimsky later responded to this claim by saying that, at the time, Voronkov was still a city councillor, that a variety of public officials attended the party, and that he was not friends with Voronkov himself. He also said he was shot in the neck in 1996 while another person was killed because he reportedly refused to pay money to gangs. Argument also says an assassination attempt happened on him five years earlier in November 1991, when unidentified people shot at him, killing another person with him, Kostiantyn Kravchenko.

In 2003, MP Hryhoriy Omelchenko (who was known for investigating political scandals, such as the death of Georgiy Gongadze) called for the opening of criminal cases against Mirimsky on allegations of his ties. Mirimsky responded by saying that Crimean police had been repeatedly investigating him, but that no case was opened, although other sources say that several were but were stalled at the Prosecutor General's Office. Mirimsky also said that the rumours had started in 1994 due to what he called "communists". By 2008, he was still called the "watcher" in Alushta, with people saying that little happened in the city without his consent.

== Political career ==
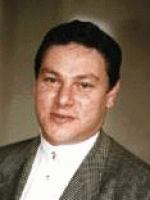
Mirimsky during an official portrait for the 3rd convocation in 1998, during his second term

=== Verkhovna Rada ===
Mirimsky first entered national politics in November of 1994, when he ran in the 1994 Ukrainian parliamentary elections for the Verkhovna Rada. He was ultimately elected from constituency No. 25, which represents the Kyivskyi district of Simferopol in the Autonomous Republic of Crimea. Upon entering the Rada, he joined the "Independents" group, and was thus non-partisan. After four years, he was re-elected during the 1998 Ukrainian parliamentary elections, but this time for his self-founded party of Soyuz in District No. 2 (also represented Simferopol). He founded Soyuz a year prior, which was formed on the basis of the defunct and banned regionalist party called the Crimean Party, with the first constituent congress of Soyuz being held on 15 March 1997, during which Svitlana Savchenko was voted its leader. Upon entering the Rada again, he sat with the Independents until 1999, when he joined the newly founded Labour Ukraine faction. During this time, he also chaired the Subcommittee on Legislative Support of Economic Law Enforcement and served on the Committee on Fighting Organised Crime and Corruption.

Mirimsky ran for a third time during the 2002 Ukrainian parliamentary elections, this time as a self-nominated candidate, although he again ran in District No. 2. He won the election with 32.76% against 10 other opponents. He then changed his party multiple times: going from United Ukraine (2002) to the small group of "Democracy" (2004, only as an authorised representative) to another small party of "People's Choice" (2004), and then back to Soyuz (2004-05, only as an authorised representative). During this time, he retained his membership of the Committee on Fighting Organised Crime and Corruption. After choosing not to re-run in the 2006 Ukrainian parliamentary elections, he left the Verkhovna Rada for six years to focus on regional politics in Crimea, until he finally decided to return in 2012. He said in June 2012 that he was about 70% sure that he would run in that election, and prior to it, on 6 August, he signed an election memorandum with Anatolii Mohyliov, the then Prime Minister of Crimea, which was mocked by the local press as a pact with "marginals".

Three weeks before the 2012 Ukrainian parliamentary election, the favoured likely candidate for District No. 2, Oleksandr Batalin, who was associated with the Party of Regions, unexpectedly withdrew from the race citing his health and pledged his support for Mirimsky. This led to various rumours about there being a deal between the two, although after Batalin withdrew, the Party of Regions announced that they would favour the Communist Party of Ukraine candidate in the district, and not Mirimsky. Dmytro Omelchuk, a political scientist, later said that the ledger for the Party of Regions showed Mirimsky for that campaign season. The subsequent election also proved to be controversial, with his main rival, Serhiy Kutsenko of the Youth Party of Ukraine, accusing Mirimsky's canvassers of threatening him, although Mirimsky himself denied this, and Mirimsky also sued several times against local Crimean media over libel, which he lost. Among the claims the media spread, particularly Zerkalo Nedeli, was that he had created Soyuz to help the Party of Regions in gaining seats. Despite the controversies, he ultimately won the election with 36.45% of the vote against 19 other opponents. Upon joining the Rada after many years, he joined the Independents group again and became Deputy Chairman of the Committee on Foreign Affairs. He said that the Party of Regions had offered him a spot in their party, but later retracted the offer after he did not support their candidate for the post of Chairman of the Verkhovna Rada, Volodymyr Rybak. Towards the end of his mandate, he joined the parliamentary group For Peace and Stability. The group had split mostly from the Party of Regions and Communist Party of Ukraine in response to Euromaidan. He did not run for re-election in the snap 2014 Ukrainian parliamentary elections, which was declared after the Rada dissolved early.

=== Verkhovna Rada of Crimea ===
Mirimsky claimed in later interviews that this was his first attempt to enter politics was in early 1994, when he ran for the Verkhovna Rada of Crimea in the first elections for it, but was defeated by a Russia Bloc candidate, with the party going on to win the majority of the parliament. In 2001, it was said he was one of four groups that competed to install their favoured Prime Minister of Crimea, alongside the communists, supporters of Anatoliy Franchuk, and supporters of Andriy Senchenko. Mirimsky later said that he had helped successfully elect Serhiy Kunitsyn to the post again after his previous premiership had collapsed in mid-2001 due to 83 deputies voting against it.

On 22 September 2002, he was elected to the Verkhovna Rada of Crimea in a by-election for constituency No. 25 with 63% of the vote (he was still a People's Deputy of Ukraine at the time). His having a dual mandate was extensively discussed at the time, as opponents like Vasyl Kiselyov, the then Deputy Chairman of the Council of Ministers of Crimea, argued that it was undue to have both parliamentary immunity from the Rada and be able to have influence in Crimea at the same time. According to opponents, the local laws made it clear that a person could not hold both a mandate as a People's Deputy of Ukraine as a Deputy of the Verkhovna Rada of Crimea. After the case went legal, the Election Commission of Crimea adopted a special resolution that Mirimsky was the winner of the 22 September election, but that he could not hold the mandate in Crimea at the same time, and that he had until 18 October to officially surrender his mandate as a People's Deputy of Ukraine or face expulsion from the Verkhovna Rada of Crimea. Mirimsky dismissed the commission's findings, calling it politically motivated and due to external pressure. After this, the Supreme Council of Crimea in a special session also voted to abide by the commission's findings and terminated his powers as a deputy, although technically he had not even received his mandate yet. This was reversed later when the Central District Court of Simferopol, under Kateryna Tymoshenko, invalidated the Supreme Council of Crimea's resolution, calling it a gross violation of the Constitution of Ukraine. Ultimately, he was able to be registered as a deputy and was given the certificate in November 2002. After retaining the deputyship for just a few months, his term ended in 2003.

In 2005, a leaked call from 31 October 2004 was published, in which Mirimsky and Oleksandr Melnyk, who was earlier accused by the Interior Ministry of Crimea of being part of "Seilem", discussed the 2004 Ukrainian presidential election. In the leaked call, he discussed quotas as part of a Spoils system if Viktor Yanukovych won the election, and said that Soyuz had 18 deputies at the time and that he supported Oleksiy Kostusyev becoming Soyuz's leader. Kostusyev was previously Chairman of the Antimonopoly Committee of Ukraine, although he had never been affiliated with Crimea, instead having been a politician in Odesa. He also said he would absorb politicians who were politically disgraced by other parties, like former deputy Sergei Ivanov, if it meant getting higher seats and getting ministerial quotas in Crimea. In 2006, upon leaving the Verkhovna Rada, he rejoined the Verkhovna Rada of Crimea. He did not run again in the Verkhovna Rada because his electoral bloc that combined Soyuz with the pro-Russian parties of the Slavic Party, Fatherland, and Socialist Ukraine, called "For Union," only won 0.20% of the national vote, which was not enough for a seat. In May 2010, while in parliament, it was announced that he would lead Soyuz in joining a majority coalition with other pro-Russian parties. His powers were terminated early in 2012 upon his entering the Verkhovna Rada due to the prohibition of dual mandates.

=== 2010 run for Mayor of Simferopol ===
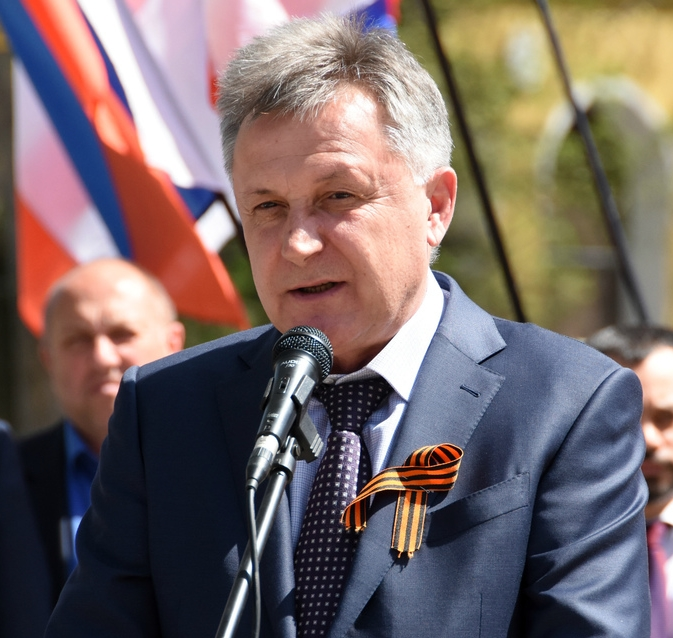
Ahyeyev in 2018. Mirimsky ran against him for the 2010 mayorship of Simferopol, but ultimately lost the election.

In 2010, upon Hennadiy Babenko's resignation as Mayor of Simferopol, Mirimsky announced he would run for the post against the Party of Regions candidate Viktor Ahyeyev. In an interview outlining his plans for Simferopol, he said that he would conduct a full audit of municipal finances that would be transparent, create a dedicated municipal hotline similar to Odesa, work on proper trash removal, and establish a local business council for private enterprises, modeled after Yuri Luzhkov's policy when he was Mayor of Moscow. His election would be marred by scandals, with news outlets accusing him of threatening the Chairman of the Election Commission, Natalia Kapvskaya, in front of voters at Polling Station No. 08004. He was also accused during the race of pressuring other competitors to help him get the post of mayor, although these statements remained unconfirmed. Exit polls a few days before the election had put Ahyeyev at 38.7% and Mirimsky at 15.8%, with 46.8% of participants saying that they would never vote for him. On 1 November 2010, it was announced that he had lost the race to Ahyeyev, who won 49% of the vote, to Mirimsky's 25%. Bazhenov, a member of the Communist Party of Ukraine, was third place with 11%. A few days later, with the voting count finished, Ahyeyev would end with 47.42% of the votes, Mirimsky 22.03%, and Bazhenov 10.71%. Some outlets attributed his loss to starting his campaign late after debating whether to run for the mayor's office and to weak voter turnout, as only 41.32% of Simferopol residents voted. At the same time, the Party of Regions won by a wide margin everywhere in Crimea and took the mayoral offices in nearly every city, so others said it was not unexpected or an upset.

== Political views ==
=== Domestic policy ===
==== Autonomy of Crimea ====
Mirimsky was a strong supporter of more autonomy for Crimea in a federalist Ukraine, and that Crimea should be able to set its own economic laws, such as taxes. He also pushed against the 2013 "Zayats amendment", appealing to the Constitutional Court of Ukraine, which had subordinated the Crimean constitution to the Ukrainian one. Mirimsky also supported a ban on addressing citizens of the country as "Ukrainians" due to the implications and supported instead "citizens of Ukraine". He also advocated for dual citizenship within Ukraine, which he said he believed would be supported by the Communists and Party of Regions.

==== Language rights ====
Mirimsky supported giving the Russian language either official status within Ukraine or as a state language in Ukraine, second to Ukrainian. He also spoke exclusively in Russian at the Verkhovna Rada when he was a deputy, which stirred controversy among Ukrainian-language rights supporters, such as Oleh Tyahnybok of Svoboda, and said that the Rada should be able to translate Russian if deputies wished. Thus, he also supported the 2012 On the Principles of State Language Policy law, which expanded the use of regional languages in Ukraine, namely Russian, and which he called a "first step" although he said this meant little to Crimea.

==== Orange Revolution ====
Mirimsky, in interviews, called the Orange Revolution of 2004 a revolution of "lies and betrayal" and accused Viktor Yushchenko, the president after the revolution, of having a presidency that had "a semblance of democracy on a background of anarchy". Instead, he described the preceding Leonid Kuchma years, which were widely referred to as authoritarian in Western media, as years of stability and rules compared to Yushchenko.

==== Relations with Party of Regions ====
Although never a member of the Party of Regions, he called himself closer to the party than to the pro-European politics advocated for by the "orange" camp. He also called Svoboda, an ultranationalist Ukrainian party, "political lawbreakers", while saying that pro-Russian forces were partisans in Ukraine. He said in 2013 that he wanted pro-Russian forces to unite and that he backed the Russian Bloc in the Crimean parliament.

==== Reaction to 2014 annexation ====
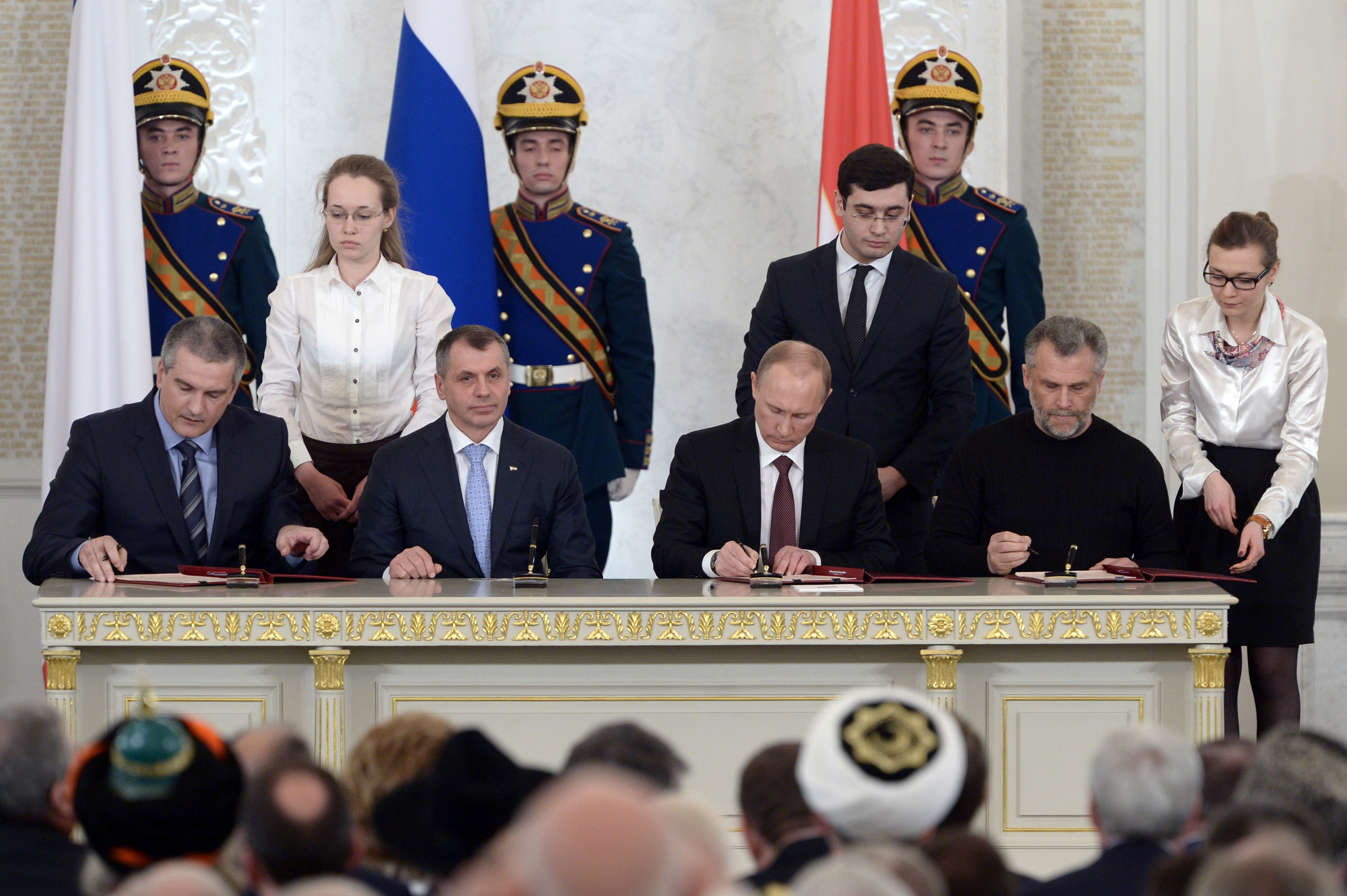
Mirimsky opposed the 2014 Russian annexation, depicted here during the signing of the treaty of accession with Russian-installed Crimean leaders in Moscow.

In response to Euromaidan and the subsequent 2014 Russian annexation of Crimea, he said he would not give up his mandate in the Verkhovna Rada, and instead serve out his full term there. He also did not join Crimean politicians who defected to Russia, and distanced himself from the new Crimean authorities. He also refused to continue in politics after the annexation, and in the end supported treating Ukrainian passport holders that still resided in Crimea as valid. However, at the same time, he called the 2014 Crimean status referendum, which was controversial and not recognised by most other nations, "honest" although he recognised it as being controversial due to its legal status. He accused Ukrainian nationalists of provoking the referendum, and said that the politicians in Kyiv had divided up the nation in 2014 and described Crimea as being "Ukrainian or empty", which pushed it towards Russia. Mirimsky also attributed the subsequent cut-off of Ukrainian water and electricity to Crimea after its annexation to having lost goodwill in Crimea, and tha the had attempted to lobby the new president Petro Poroshenko about restoring the water to improve relations.

Mirimsky, in 2016, when talking in interviews about the annexation, said that Crimeans likely did not want to return to Ukraine and that Russia would never give Crimea back, regardless of who the Russian president was. He also described a ban on the Mejlis of the Crimean Tatar People in the now Russian Crimea that year as a banning that could not have anything done about it because it was not registered and he said there was no protests in Crimea to the ban. He also praised Gennady Bakharev, who was Head of Simferopol for the Russian authorities at the time, but did not comment on Ageev. However, as Mirimsky himself said during the interview, he did not take a Russian passport, and that he did not intend to, while he said that Soyuz barely existed after the Russian annexation and that most members were absorbed into United Russia.

=== Foreign policy ===
Soyuz, which he founded and led, called for a union of Ukraine, Russia, and Belarus in a Union State. As a strong supporter of Russia, Soyuz also opposed withdrawing the Black Sea Fleet, which was stationed in Sevastopol, although it was Ukrainian territory at the time. Soyuz, during the 2009 Russia–Ukraine gas dispute, even asked Gazprom and Medvedev to exclusively supply Sevastopol and Crimea with gas at Russian domestic prices, and not the prices paid by the rest of Ukraine. Mirimsky, however, in 2013, said that "Ukraine should get along with everything", although at the same time he argued that European prices were a noose and that a customs and currency union with Russia and Belarus was preferable to Europe. In May 2013, he said he predicted that the European Union–Ukraine Association Agreement would be signed within that year, when he was Deputy Chair of the Committee on Foreign Relations.

== Personal life ==
He was married to Victoria Alexandrovna, who was born in 1971, and together they had three children. He and Victoria lived together from 28 April 1989, although they had known each other for five years prior, when he was selling jewelry at the bazaar. Their first child was Tatyana, born in 1990, and their second was Roman, born in 1997. Their two elder children both studied abroad, with Tatyana graduating from an institute in England and attending a master's program in business management in Manchester. Roman also planned to attend college in Manchester as of 2011, which he did, alongside studying at the City University of London afterwards and the University of Westminster starting in 2015. Their third child, Benjamin, was born later in 2010. Mirimsky said that his eldest child, Tatyana, came up with the name Benjamin after the American president Benjamin Franklin.

As of 2016, he lived in Kyiv after the annexation and refused to obtain a Russian passport. In the early 2000s, Mirimsky was also accused of having an Israeli passport due to his Jewish heritage. He immediately denied this and said that he was only a citizen of Ukraine. Hryhoriy Omelchenko responded by saying he had "official documents" from the Ministry of Internal Affairs of Israel, which showed that he had an Israeli identity card that listed his residence at Ashkelon. After he sued for defamation, the courts found that he did not have an Israeli passport.

=== Death ===
On 27 April 2017, Mirimsky died in Kyiv from a heart attack. In the preceding months, he had suffered two strokes, and was taken from Düsseldorf, Germany, to Kyiv in critical condition on 26 April before he died. It was reported that he was to be buried on 28 April at the Baikove Cemetery in Kyiv.

== Honours and awards ==
Mirimsky was awarded the following honours:

- Certificate of Honour of the Cabinet of Ministers of Ukraine (2003)
- Honoured Economist of Ukraine (2003)
- Order of Peter the Great (for strengthening Russian-Ukrainian relations)
- Order of St. Agapit of the Caves, II degree (from UOC-MP)

== See also ==
- Andriy Senchenko, another Crimean politician who condemned the 2014 annexation
- Serhiy Kunitsyn, former Prime Minister of Crimea and Governor of Sevastopol who also condemned the annexation
- Sergey Aksyonov, founder and party leader of Russian Unity, another regionalist party in Crimea
- Yuriy Meshkov, former exiled President of Crimea and leader of the separatist regionalist party Republican Party of Crimea
