= Yelyzaveta Yasko =

Ukrainian politician (born 1990)

- Єлизавета Ясько
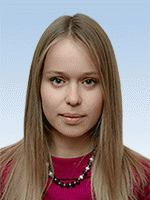
- Official portrait, 2019

People's Deputy of Ukraine
- Incumbent
- Assumed office 29 August 2019

Personal details
- Born: 17 October 1990 (age 35) Kiev, Ukrainian SSR, Soviet Union
- Party: Servant of the People
- Education: Taras Shevchenko National University of Kyiv; Blavatnik School of Government; University of Oxford
- Occupation: Politician; political scientist

Yelyzaveta Oleksiyivna Yasko (Ukrainian: Єлизавета Олексіївна Ясько; born 17 October 1990), also known as Lisa Yasko, is a Ukrainian politician, cultural affairs expert and film producer.

Yasko is a member of the Ukrainian Parliament of the 9th convocation elected in the 2019 Ukrainian parliamentary election and a member of the Committee on Foreign Policy and Inter-Parliamentary Cooperation. She is the head of inter-parliamentary cooperation, bilateral and multilateral relationships.

Yasko was the Head of the Ukrainian delegation to the Parliamentary Assembly of the Council of Europe from September 2019 until January 2020.

Yasko is also a producer of the documentary film "Crimea: Russia's Dark Secret". and a founder of the initiative "Yellow Blue Strategy".

== Early life, education and career ==
Yasko was born in Kyiv in 1990.

She holds a Bachelor's and master's degrees with distinction in Political science from Taras Shevchenko National University of Kyiv. During 2013–2014, she underwent an exchange program at Lomonosov Moscow State University. Yasko was the first Ukrainian who graduated from Blavatnik School of Government, University of Oxford, holding a master's degree in Public Policy. While studying, she was a president of Oxford University Ukrainian Society (2016–2017).

From 2011 to 2012, Yasko was an intern at the Parliament of Ukraine, working for the Committee of Culture and at the European Centre for Informational Support. During 2013–2016, she consulted various NGOs and politicians on cultural policy reforms.

From 2014 to 2016, Yasko was a project manager at a PR & GR agency CFC Consulting, Ukraine Crisis Media Center and at the Stratcom team at the Presidential Administration of Ukraine. She coordinated a number of events, including the music commemorative campaign "Witness", devoted to the 75th Anniversary of the Babi Yar tragedy, which won the first Cannes Lion Award in the history of Ukraine. Another project was the Ukrainian campaign for the 2016 Netherlands referendum on the EU Association Agreement with Ukraine called "Hop Nederland Hop". She also was the executive officer for the multimedia project "UN Hundred," presented on behalf of Ukrainian delegation to the United Nations at its General Assembly sessions in 2014 and 2015.

Yasko also worked at the Department for Digital, Culture, Media and Sport (UK, 2017). She conducted research and produced a policy recommendation on the improvement of access opportunities in arts education for disadvantaged communities in the UK.

Following her return to Ukraine, Yasko founded an initiative "Yellow Blue Strategy," aimed to promote the development of cultural diplomacy, creative economy, creative education and public policy in Ukraine. Yellow Blue Strategy has also been organizing cultural events. In cooperation with Jamie Doran (Clover Films) Yasko worked on filming documentaries, such as "Crimea: Russia's Dark Secret" for Al Jazeera and a series of documentaries on the history of the Soviet KGB for European TV channels ZDF and Arte.

In 2019, Yasko gave guest lectures at Ukrainian Catholic University. Her lectures included topics of Ukrainian cultural diplomacy and strategic communications.

== Political career ==
=== Parliamentary career ===
Yasko is a member of the 9th Verkhovna Rada (the parliament of Ukraine) since August 2019. She was elected in the 2019 Ukrainian parliamentary election as number 15 in the list of "Servant of the People". She is a member of the Committee on Foreign Affairs and Inter-parliamentary Cooperation, and head of Inter-parliamentary Cooperation, Bilateral and Multilateral Relations. Yasko is a leader of all-party parliamentary group "Happy Ukraine", aiming to foster the development of happiness in Ukrainian society and facilitate social dialogue, well-being, a feeling of security and hope for the future. She is also a member of the "Brand of the Ukrainian state" group.

Yasko actively collaborates with experts, setting up regular expert talks in the Verkhovna Rada. She also supports the development of Romani communities and Roma rights in Ukraine.

Yasko expressed her concerns regarding the preliminary agreement by Ukraine to the Trilateral Contact Group in Minsk proposals on the envisioned Advisory Council. In her view, it could undermine international support for Ukraine in the conflict and legitimise Russian proxies in Eastern Ukraine.

She also publicly supported the legislative motion on regulating the process of compensation for the former owners of the nationalised banks, marked as critical for unblocking the IMF's financial support of Ukraine and preventing the default of the Ukrainian state.

Yasko has been engaged in drafting legislation on a range of issues, including the regulation of lobbying, countering corruption, equal representation, remedial action in the wake of Russian military aggression in Ukraine. She was also among the initiators of the Verkhovna Rada Appeal to the Parliaments and Inter-parliamentary Organisations concerning the condemnation of Russian aggression and numerous human rights violations in the occupied Crimea, and of the Statement on nonrecognition of the legitimacy of elections held by Russia in Crimea and Sevastopol.

Yasko has authored the following draft laws: On the principles of sanctions policy (5191), amendments to the Criminal Procedural Code (5192) and the Criminal Code of Ukraine (5193); On the policy of non-recognition (5165) and amendments to the Criminal Code of Ukraine (5166); On assistance to people from non-democratic countries (5194) and amendments to the Tax Code of Ukraine (5195).

She is co-chair of the APPG 'Ukraine 603,700'. The APPG aims to unite the efforts of public authorities, local governments and the public sector in order to restore the territorial integrity of Ukraine, and the rights and freedoms of Ukrainian citizens in the occupied territories.

At Kyiv Security Forum she signed "12 points of strategic partnership between the US and Ukraine", guide for strengthening our cooperation. It is supported by more than 70 politicians and activists.

=== Parliamentary Assembly of the Council of Europe ===
Yasko was elected Head of the Ukrainian Delegation to the Parliamentary Assembly of the Council of Europe on 17 September 2019.

The Ukrainian Delegation, headed by Yasko, refrained from participating in the PACE Autumn session 2019. It was a sign of protest against Russia's reinstatement to the Assembly without meeting the requirements of the Assembly resolutions adopted in response to Russian aggression against Ukraine.

Instead, Yasko held consultations with the representatives of other delegations, including those who voted in favour of Russia's return to the organisation. This resulted in the establishment of the informal inter-parliamentary group Baltic Plus, together with the delegations of Estonia, Latvia, Lithuania and Georgia. The aim of the inter-parliamentary group is to produce joint efforts to combat Russia's efforts to undermine the efficiency and legitimacy of PACE and to present a positive agenda on culture, migration, human rights and digitalisation.

On 16 January 2020, the Verkhovna Rada sent its delegation to the 2020 winter PACE session. Yasko explained the return with the "need to battle [for Ukraine] in new conditions at all possible grounds".

Ukrainian delegation initiated concerns regarding the credentials of Russian delegation in the Assembly and spoke against nominating Petr Tolstoi for the Vice President of PACE. It justified its concerns by Russia's systemic failure to comply with the Assembly's resolutions concerning Ukraine and Georgia and presence of Russian MPs elected in the fake elections in the occupied Crimea. Yasko also noted that the goals for the delegation for the Winter Session 2020 would be the de-occupation of Crimea, countering Russian aggression in eastern Ukraine, liberation of political prisoners, implementation of Minsk agreements, enhancement of the international sanctions, as well as fight against authoritarianism in Russia itself.

On 31 January 2020, the Ukrainian Delegation, together with the representatives of Estonia, Great Britain, Georgia, Iceland, Latvia, Lithuania, Moldova, Slovakia and Sweden, signed the joint declaration expressing regret of the Assembly's approval of the credentials submitted by the Russian Federation.The signatories to the declaration also demanded on Russia's implementation of resolutions adopted in previous years in respect of the armed aggression in Ukraine, Georgia, and of the utmost concern at the treatment of Crimean Tatars.

At the winter session in 2020 Yasko also delivered a speech condemning Russia's numerous violations of international law and human rights, including the rights of Crimean Tatars.

As Chairperson of the Ukrainian Delegation to PACE, Yelyzaveta Yasko submitted the following motions for resolutions: 'Gradual cultural erasure and other threats to culture', and 'Polarization of the political environment as a hidden danger of population displacement'.

On 11 January 2021, Yasko was replaced as Chairperson of the Ukrainian Delegation to PACE by Maria Mezentseva (also of Servant of the People), and remains a member of the delegation.

In January 2021, she became a permanent member of PACE's Monitoring Committee.

On 4 February 2021, Yasko was elected permanent representative of Ukraine to the European Commission against Racism and Intolerance (ECRI).

== Political views and statements ==
In March 2020 Yasko, along with colleagues from the Servant of the People Party, opposed the proposed establishment of an Advisory Council within the framework of the Minsk Trilateral Contact Group. Yasko argued that the Advisory Council's establishment would change the format of the negotiations, turning the Russian Federation into an observer rather than a direct participant in the conflict, that it would carry with it recognition of the representatives of the Donetsk and Luhansk People's Republics, considered by Ukraine as "terrorist organizations", as legitimate representatives of ORDLO (temporarily occupied territories of Ukraine), that it would undermine the Ukrainian position in international courts and the potential for compensation for Ukraine for damages and losses caused by Russia. According to Yasko, approving the Advisory Council format would risk bringing defeat for Ukraine on international platforms, the lifting of international sanctions imposed on Russia during the course of its armed aggression, and defeat for Ukraine in its efforts to fight for the truth about Russian aggression in the information war.

On 16 March 2019, along with other MPs, Yelyzaveta Yasko signed a letter to the Secretary of the National Security and Defence Council of Ukraine, Oleksiy Danilov, requesting the dismissal of his advisor Serhii Syvokho in connection with his statements regarding 'internal conflict in Donbas', which ran contrary to Ukrainian law, where the Russian Federation is officially recognised as an aggressor country against Ukraine.

Along with a group of other deputies from 'Servant of the People', Yelyzaveta Yasko publicly supported draft law 3260, on amendments to legislative acts of Ukraine to improve certain mechanisms for regulating banking activities. It has been identified as being crucial to unblocking Ukraine's cooperation with the International Monetary Fund, and aims to prevent Ukraine from defaulting. In a post on her Facebook page, Yasko stated: 'This bill will make it impossible to repeal the NBU's decision on the nationalisation/liquidation of banks and unfairly compensating their former owners.'

She authored or co-authored bills on granting the status of participant in hostilities to volunteers, on the ethical principles of members of parliament, on the creation of the National Agency of Ukraine for Overcoming the Consequences of Armed Aggression of the Russian Federation, on the transparent regulation of lobbying, on improving the effectiveness of anti-corruption law enforcement, and on equal gender representation.

Yasko was one of the initiators of the bill on the Verkhovna Rada's appeal to the parliaments of other states and parliamentary assemblies of international organisations to condemn Russian armed aggression and human rights violations in occupied Crimea. She was also one of the initiators of the Verkhovna Rada's statements on non-recognition of the 2014 and 2019 Crimean parliamentary elections and post-Russian-annexation elections in Sevastopol, and on the inadmissibility of restoring large-scale water supply along the North Crimean Canal to occupied Crimea.

She has her own blog on the website of Ukrayinska Pravda.

== Civic activity ==
In 2008–2014, Yasko was actively engaged in student life at Taras Shevchenko National University. She was involved in events' management and student government activities. She also has been writing for student newspapers and organizing music concerts, theatre plays and academic conferences.

Yasko was also a member of the Science Community at Faculty of Philosophy and received numerous diplomas for the best research papers at conferences in politics and international affairs.

In 2011–2013 she was a scholar of Zavtra.ua national leaders program, founded a social and cultural project "Play For Change", aimed at drawing the attention of the youth towards social problems.

She actively participated in the 2014 Ukrainian revolution.

During 2014–2015 Yasko was a scholar of the European Forum Alpbach. In 2014 she also represented Ukraine at an international young leaders program Clinton Global Initiative University.

In 2015, along with Ukrainian Ministry of Foreign Affairs, Yasko was actively involved in organizing and hosting a music diplomacy event in support of Ukrainian political prisoners illegally detained in Russia. She also founded a startup "Kyiv Music Labs" to promote Ukrainian music and support Ukrainian musicians.

Member of the Swiss peacemaking initiative Caux Initiative of Change. In 2016 she did Caux Scholars Program, a training course on restorative justice, leadership and conflict resolution. In 2018 and 2019 she co-organized the annual conference Caux Dialogue on Land and Security.

She launched the Yellow Blue Strategy Fund. The website states that this is a fund for the cultural promotion of Ukraine and of freedom, and the fund's mission is the cultural integration of Ukraine and its promotion in the world. The organization's activities are aimed at supporting the cultural communication of the regions of Ukraine, and high-quality, effective promotion of Ukraine abroad.

== Personal life ==
A few days before former President of Georgia Mikheil Saakashvili's October 2021 return to Georgia he recorded a video on Facebook with Yasko in which they disclosed they were having a romantic relationship. On 1 June 2023 Yasko revealed that she and Saakashvili had become parents, the gender and birthdate of the baby were not announced. This was Yasko's first child and Saakashvili's fourth child. At the time of birth Saakashvili was imprisoned in Georgia.

Yasko is the first Ukrainian to have graduated from the Blavatnik School of Government at Oxford University.

In her interview for Business Ukraine, Yasko said that she had returned to Ukraine in order to facilitate changes in the country. Having seen the "big picture" from abroad, she said that she had a very positive attitude toward the future of Ukraine.

Yasko was the youngest Chair of the Ukrainian Delegation to PACE.

Yasko financed her studies at Oxford through more than 50 donors, including scholarships (Worldwide Studies, Seed Grant) and a crowdfunding campaign.

She holds a professional music education and author of music and lyrics of over 50 music pieces.

In March 2020, Yasko was listed among NV's Top 100 Ukrainian successful women under number 7 in Politics.

== See also ==
- List of members of the parliament of Ukraine, 2019–24
