= Igor Lukashyov =

Russian politician

- Игорь Лукашёв
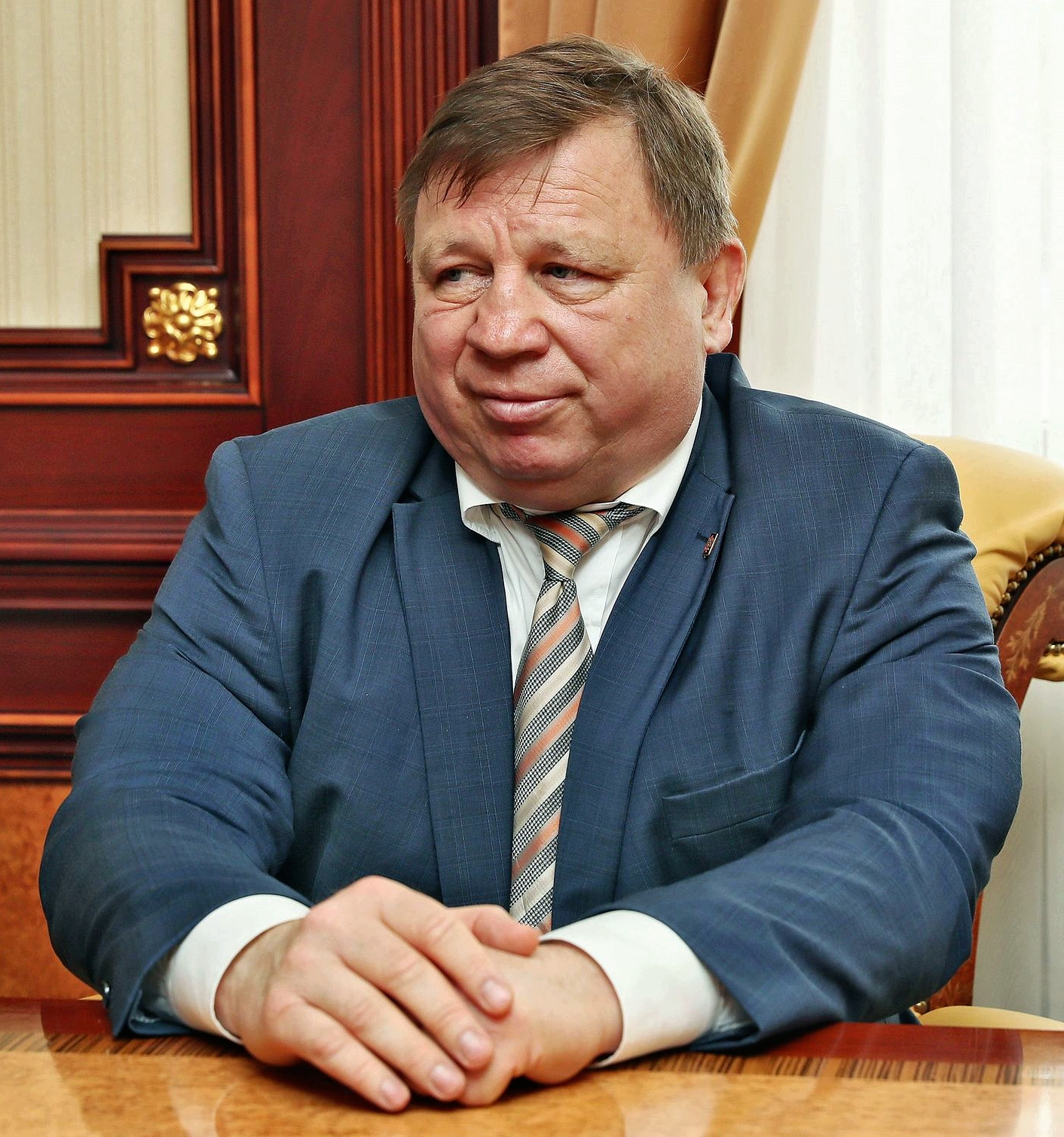

2nd Head of Simferopol
- In office 22 September 2017 – 9 November 2018
- Preceded by: Gennady Bakharev
- Succeeded by: Natalya Malenko

Member of the State Council of Crimea
- In office 2014 – 22 September 2017

Member of the Verkhovna Rada of Crimea
- In office 2006–2014

Personal details
- Born: Ihor Mykhaylovych Lukashev; 13 June 1962 (age 64) Simferopol, Crimea, Soviet Union
- Party: United Russia; Party of Regions (until 2014)

Igor Mikhailovych Lukashov (Ukrainian: Ігор Михайлович Лукашев; Russian: Игорь Михайлович Лукашёв; born 13 June 1962), is a Russian and former Ukrainian politician who had served as the 2nd head of Simferopol from 2017 to 2018.

He had also served as the Member of the State Council of Crimea from 2014 to 2017, even before the annexation of Crimea as a member of the Verkhovna Rada of Crimea since 2006.

== Life ==
Ihor Lukashev was born in Simferopol on 13 June 1962.

His father, Mykhaylo, who worked in the police, died in the 1970s. His mother is a confectioner. His older brother graduated from a maritime school and worked in civil courts. The Lukashev family lived in Kamchatka for several years.

Ihor studied shotokan karate with his brothers Oleksandr and Yevhen Skryabyn in Simferopol. He played for the youth and adult national teams of Ukraine in this sport.

He served in the ranks of the Internal Troops of the Ministry of Internal Affairs of the USSR.

== Career ==
He began his career in 1979, working in Simferopol at the UTOS enterprise. He graduated from the Dnipropetrovsk Civil Engineering Institute in 1985, in the Department of Industrial and Civil Engineering, having received the specialty of a civil engineer. Then he worked in his specialty in a mobile mechanized column No. 181 of the Krymspetsstroy trust and at the Simferopol factory of plastic fittings.

In 1988, Lukashev began working in the Leninist Communist Youth Union of Ukraine of the Zheleznodorozhny District Committee of Simferopol, holding positions such as the chairman of a cooperative in the association of youth interest clubs, an instructor-methodologist in the Rodina patriotic club, and an instructor in the department of defense-mass work of the secretariat of the Simferopol city committee. More than 600 children went in for different kinds of sports in Rodina club.

In 1990, he was an inspector of the security department of the information and analytical service in the Svenos joint venture. From 1990 to 1992, he worked in the Salem association as director of the medical center, and then as acting general director. After, for six years, he was the general director of the Summit company, which was associated with the leadership of the Salem organized crime group.

=== Politics ===
From 1996 to 1998, he was a member of the Simferopol City Council. Later, from 2003 to 2006, he was a private entrepreneur. He worked in the companies chair, Scania, Interkontbank, Cardinal, Planeta, in the Flamingo restaurant and the Falstaff bar.

In 2006, he was elected to the Verkhovna Rada of Crimea from the Party of Regions. He headed the budget and finance committee. During his time as a member of parliament, Lukashev was associated with another member of the Crimean parliament, Oleksandr Melnyk, and the chairman of the Crimean parliament, Anatoliy Hrytsenko. Melnik and Lukashev were called the "gray cardinals" of Simferopol. Melnyk, Hrytsenko and Lukashev were associated with real estate on the site of the former Mir cinema, a Metro supermarket and a building on Gogol Street. Lukashev himself was accused of lobbying the interests of the family of businessman Sergey Beim.

Lukashev was repeatedly included in the lists of the most influential politicians of the peninsula. In 2006, according to the newspaper "Krymskaya Pravda", he took 16th place, in 2007. - 11th place. According to the Crimean Independent Center for Political Researchers and Journalists, in 2008 Lukashev became the third.

In July 2008, Moskovskaya Pravda journalist Eric Kotlyar called Lukashev a representative of Moscow's interests in the Crimean authorities, linking him to the sale of the Massandra Palace.

In July 2009, Sergey Aksyonov accused Hrytsenko, Melnyk and Lukashev of lobbying the interests of the Soyuz-Viktan company, a manufacturer of alcoholic beverages. Aksyonov called them “a political gang. Lukashev himself said that information about lobbying for these interests "nonsense.".

In August 2009, a member of the "Civil Assets of Crimea" said that Melnyk, Lukashev, Hrytsenko and Babenko caused damage to Crimea comparable to the times of the collapse of the USSR.

Against Hrytsenko, Melnyk and Lukashev, the movement “Civil Assets of Crimea” repeatedly protested. Among the slogans used by the activists was - "Down with the occupation regime of Melnyk, Hrytsenko, Lukashev.".

In September 2009, the head of the head office of the Crimean police, Hennadiy Moskal, accused the mayor of Simferopol, Hennadiy Babenko, of making decisions related to the distribution of land and issues of alienation of property, only after agreement "with members of an organized criminal group - Mr. Melnyk and Mr. Lukashev.".

In October 2009, Moskal turned to Hrytsenko, Chairman of the Crimean Parliament, with a request to testify against the leaders of the Crimean Economic Revival Party (Shevyov, Danelyan, Voronkov, Melnik and Lukashev), whom he connected with lobbying the interests of the Salem organized crime group. Lukashev called these accusations a political order.

In December 2008, Oleh Rodivilov, a member of the Vekhovna Rada of Crimea and a member of the Russian Bloc, accused Lukashev of stealing a voting card from a deputy from the Yulia Tymoshenko Bloc, Tatiana Zvereva, who was hospitalized after an accident.

Member of the Verkhovna Rada Vasyl Kiselyov accused Melnyk and Lukashev of influencing the mayor of Simferopol Babenko. Kiselyov had also registered in the Crimean parliament a draft resolution on the establishment of a temporary commission of inquiry to investigate activities related to the unauthorized seizure of land in Simferopol and illegal construction on them. Kiselyov suspected of this the firms associated with Melnyk and Lukashev.

Crimean Prosecutor General Volodymyr Boyko, after an audit, said that these firms operate legally.

Kiselyov also called for the Crimean branch of the Party of Regions to be "cleansed of ballast" and to prevent the formation of party lists by criminals.

Member of the Verkhonva Rada of Crimea and a member of the Party of Regions Serhiy Tsekov said that the inclusion of Melnyk and Lukashev in the list of the Party of Regions had a negative impact on the party's ratings due to their criminal past.

In October 2010, together with the 3rd mayor of Simferopol, Viktor Ahyeyev, he was the initiator of the creation of a "Japanese zone" in the botanical garden of Simferopol.

In November 2010, Lukashev was re-elected to the Crimean parliament in the majority constituency of the Nizhnegorsky district, gaining more than 7 thousand votes. Until February 2011, he headed the commission on industrial policy.

In December 2010, according to "Krymskaya Pravda", his ratings dropped gradually to 10th, and in 2012 he took 23rd place.

Lukashev supported the annexation of Crimea to Russia in March 2014. However, according to journalist Mark Agatov, Lukashyov did not vote for the resolution "On holding an all-Crimean referendum.". The prosecutor's office of the Autonomous Republic of Crimea suspected him of high treason, in connection with which he was put on the wanted list.

In May 2014, he became deputy director for Investments at the Krymbeton enterprise. In the elections to the State Council of Crimea in 2014, Lukashyov ran in a single-mandate constituency that included Nizhnegorsky and Sovetsky districts from United Russia [arty. "United Russia" won in all single-mandate constituencies of the peninsula Lukashyov entered the annexed parliament. Lukashyov headed the Committee on Entrepreneurship in the State Council.

In December 2014, he joined the public council of the Center for Public Procedures "Business Against Corruption".

In early 2016 he became the head of the Committee on Economic, Budgetary, Financial and Tax Policy. That same year, at the request of the head of the Republic of Crimea Aksyonov, Lukashyov was engaged in the reconstruction of the center of Simferopol.

On 22 September 2017, the deputies of the Simferopol City Council elected Igor Lukashyov as the 2nd head of Simferopol. In October 2017, Lukashyov spoke out against holding a gay pride parade in Simferopol.

On 9 November 2018, Lukashyov wrote a letter of resignation from his post.

Lukashyov is currently the president of the Thai boxing club "Skif", which during its existence has trained such athletes as Pavel Zhuravlyov, Vladimir Oleinik and Yevgeny Piskaryov. He is also a member of the Board of the Kickboxing Federation of the Republic of Crimea.

== Personal life ==
He is married to a Ukrainian wife, an raises two sons, Oleg, and Maksim. The children graduated from school with a gold medal. The youngest son Oleg is the world champion in sports dancing, while the eldest son Maxim is the winner of the world championship in Thai boxing.

He owns a Shar-Pei dog.

In 2016, Lukashev declared an annual income of 1.7 million rubles. He is the owner of a two-story house on the Salgir embankment, built in 2007. He also owns a $80,000 Toyota Land Cruiser.
