= Council of Crimea =

Council of Crimea may refer to:

- State Council of Crimea, the regional parliament of the Republic of Crimea, an unrecognized republic in the Russian Federation since 2014
- Verkhovna Rada of Crimea, parliament of the Autonomous Republic of Crimea, an autonomous republic in Ukraine, dissolved after the Russian annexation of Crimea
