= Natalya Malenko =

Russian politician (born 1959)

- Наталья Маленко
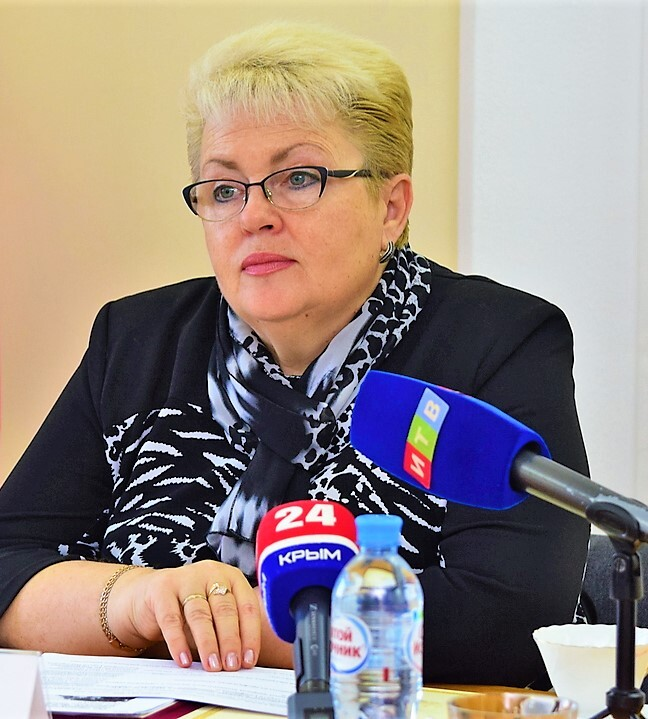
- Malenko in 2019

Member of the State Council of Crimea
- Incumbent
- Assumed office 30 September 2019

3rd Head of Simferopol
- In office 14 December 2018 – 30 September 2019
- Preceded by: Igor Lukashyov
- Succeeded by: Yelena Protsenko

Head of Simferopol (acting)
- In office 14 November 2018 – 14 December 2018

First Deputy Chairman of the State Council of the Republic of Crimea
- In office October 2016 – 14 November 2018

Chairman of the Committee of the State Council of the Republic of Crimea on labor, social protection, health care and veterans' affairs
- In office September 2014 – October 2016

Personal details
- Born: Natalya Fyodorovna Malenko; 31 July 1959 (age 66) Michurinsk, Russia Soviet Union
- Party: United Russia; Party of Regions (until 2014)

Natalya Fyodorovna Malenko (Russian: Наталья Фёдоровна Маленко; born on 31 July 1959) is a Russian politician who has been a Member of the State Council of Crimea since 30 September 2020.

Malenko had served as the third head of Simferopol from 2018 to 2019.

== Biography ==
Natalya Malenko was born on 31 July 1959 in the city of Michurinsk, Tambov Oblast.

She is a graduated of the Simferopol school number 40.

She began her career in 1976 as a draftsman at the TV factory in Simferopol.

From August 1977 to December 1979, she was the senior counselor of the comprehensive school No. 40 in Simferopol.

From December 1979 to August 1984 - chairman of the trade union committee of students of technical school No. 1 in Simferopol.

She received a higher education, whereas in 1984 she graduated from the Simferopol State University. M. V. Frunze with a degree in history, having received the qualification of a teacher of history and social science.

From August 1984 to April 1986, she was a teacher of history at secondary school No. 17 in Simferopol.

From April 1986 to August 1989, she was the First Secretary of the Central District Committee of the LKSMU, in Simferopol.

From August 1989 to August 1991, she was the Head of the Human Resources Department of the branch of the TsIR "Volna".

From August 1991 to August 1994, she was the deputy director for Educational Work of the Specialized General Education School No. 24 in Simferopol.

From August 1994 to November 1999, she was a teacher of history at the specialized secondary school of I-III levels No. 24 in Simferopol.

From November 1999 to May 2006, she was promoted to the director of the specialized general education school.

Between May 2006 to September 2014, Malenko was the Chairman of the Kyiv District Council, based in Simferopol, as a member of the Party of Regions, at the time she was a Ukrainian citizen.

In 2012, she graduated from LLC "Interregional Financial and Legal Academy" with a degree in jurisprudence, having received the qualification of a lawyer.

From 2012 to 2014, she was an assistant to the member of the Verkhovna Rada, Volodymyr Boyko.

From September 2014 to October 2016, Malenko became the Chairman of the Committee of the State Council of Crimea on labor, social protection, healthcare and veterans' affairs, when she had her Russian citizenship restored.

From October 2016 to November 2018, she became the First Deputy Chairman of the State Council of the Republic of Crimea.

On 14 November 2018, Malenko became the acting head of Simferopol. On 14 December, she was sworn into office.

On 30 September 2020, she became a member of the State Council of Crimea.

== Family ==
She is married.
