= Oleksandr Batalin =

Russian-Ukrainian politician (born 1946)

Oleksandr Batalin Alexander Batalin
- Олександр Баталін; Александр Баталин
- Batalin in Simferopol in 2018.

People's Deputy of the Verkhovna Rada of Crimea
- In office 26 March 1998 – 26 March 2006
- In office 31 October 2010 – 17 March 2014

Personal details
- Born: Oleksandr Sergeevich Batalin; 29 July 1946 (age 80) Yemanzhelinsk, Russian SFSR, Soviet Union (now Russia)
- Party: Party of Industrialists and Entrepreneurs of Ukraine; Party of Regions; United Russia
- Education: Sevastopol National Technical University

Oleksandr Sergeevich Batalin (also translated from Russian as Alexander Sergeyevich Batalin; Ukrainian: Олександр Баталін; Russian: Александр Баталин; born 29 July 1946) is a Russian and formerly Ukrainian politician and businessman who served as a People's Deputy of the Verkhovna Rada of Crimea from 1998 to 2006 and from 2010 to 2014. During the 2014 Russian annexation of Crimea, Batalin sided with Russia and supported the annexation, joining the United Russia party shortly afterwards. As a businessman, he has been the director of the Fiolent plant since 1985, a manufacturer of power tools in Crimea.

== Early life ==
Batalin was born on 29 July 1946 in the city of Yemanzhelinsk, then part of the Russian SFSR in the Soviet Union. His father worked in the Urals and was a director of an auto-repair plant in Crimea while his mother worked in production. After finishing secondary school, Batalin immediately pursued higher education in Ukraine and graduated from the Sevastopol National Technical University in 1969 with a specialisation in mechanical engineering. After his graduation, he immediately started working at the "Fiolent" plant, initially as a foreman. Gradually, Batalin rose through the ranks at Fiolent, from deputy head of workshop no. 6, head of workshop no. 6, to deputy chief engineer, and finally as chief engineer before being promoted to lead Fiolent.

== Business activities and Fiolent ==
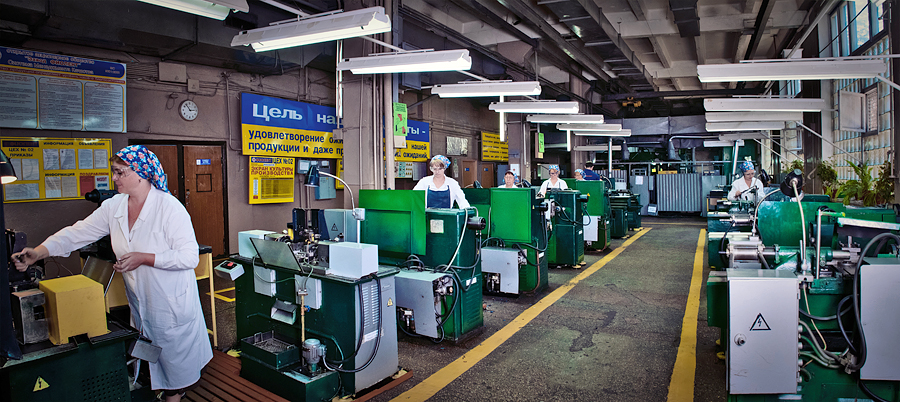
Workers at Fiolent in 2011.

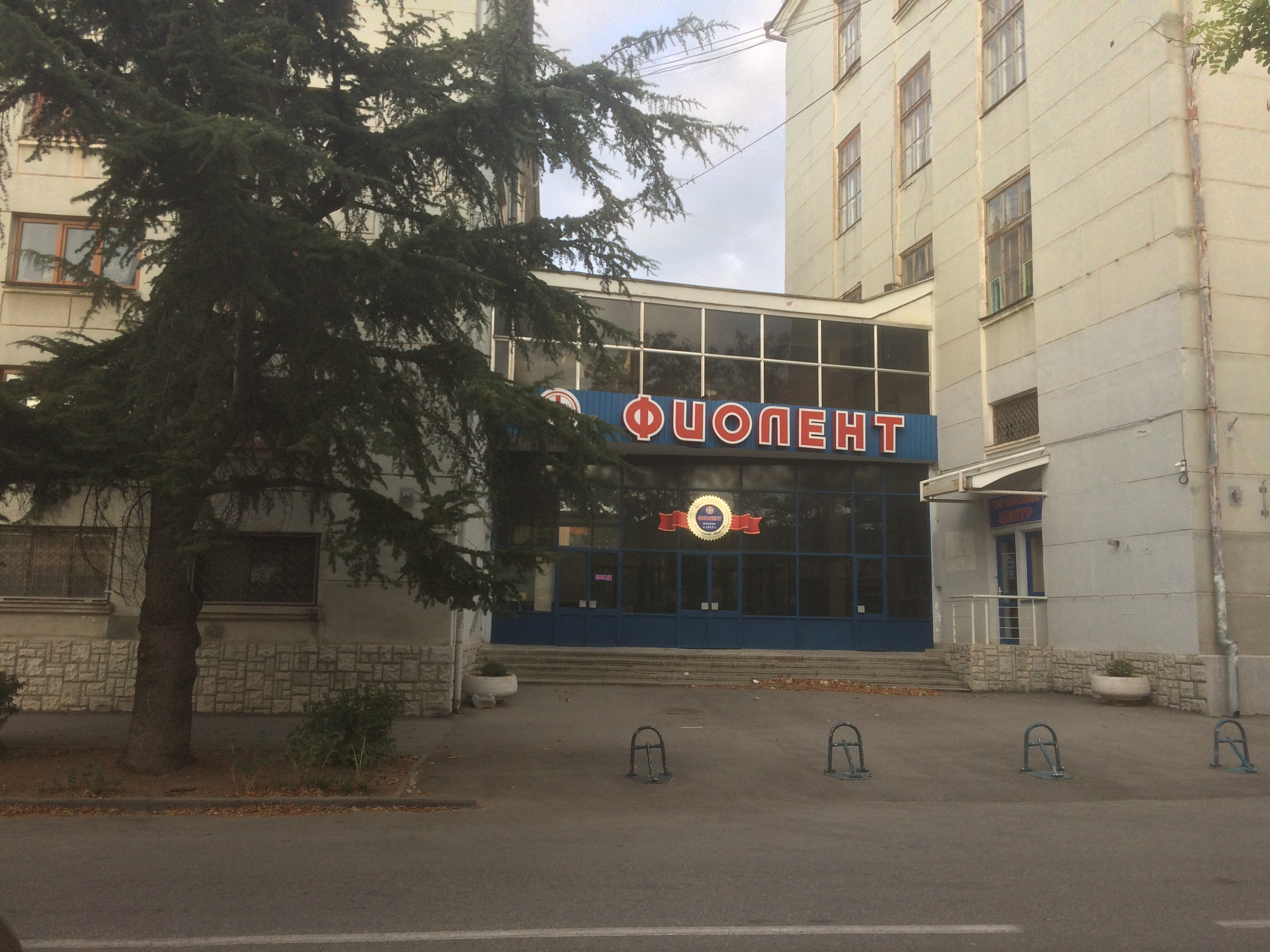
Fiolent headquarters in Simferopol in 2017.

In 1985, Batalin became director of Fiolent. After the collapse of the Soviet Union and the start of the 1990s, production at Fiolent stopped because the electronics industry was not working, although Fiolent retained an employment of 8,000 people. However, Batalin reportedly refused to split the plant, and eventually Fiolent recovered when it was corporatised in 1994, and Fiolent also began to sell electric jigsaws in addition to mass-produced power tools. In 2000, part of Fiolent was sold off, although he initially lobbied the Council of Ministers of Crimea to keep its 50% shares within the state. The following year, the State Property Fund of Ukraine sold off 31.81% of the company to Benefit Electrotechnics LLC, a Delaware-based company in the United States. The state's 50% share, by cabinet resolution no. 716 of 4 July 2012, was eventually handed to Ukroboronprom. Starting in 2013, Batalin stated that Fiolent tools would be sold in European countries. Initially, this was just in chain stores in Lithuania, although he said talks were in place to export to more countries like Poland, Turkey, and Czechia.

During the 2014 Russian annexation of Crimea, Batalin retained Fiolent's production in Crimea, and he said that the company would enter the defence-order programme of Russia. By this point, Fiolent's tools were still sold to countries like Ukraine, Georgia, Lithuania, and Poland. Even in 2016, a Vinnytsia-based proprietor obtained the trademark rights to Fiolent. Eventually, Batalin also softened his resistance to federal ownership by Russia in 2017, and also in 2023, following the Russian invasion of Ukraine, invited people from the Russian-occupied areas of the Donbas and Kherson to work at the plant in Crimea.

== Political career in Ukraine ==
In June 1997, Batalin first entered politics after he was appointed Deputy Chairman of the Council of Ministers of Crimea. He retained this post until he was dismissed in April 1998. After he left, he was elected a People's Deputy of the Verkhovna Rada of Crimea in its 3rd convocation during the 1998 Crimean parliamentary election. Within the Rada, he was elected deputy chairman of the standing commission on industry, construction, and transport. He also took an active role in drafting the early Comprehensive Program of Crimean Development and the Regional Program for Small Business Development, while simultaneously sitting on the executive committee of the City Council for Simferopol. Batalin retained his role in the Rada during the 2002 elections, although he declined to run again for one term during the 2006 elections. He returned to the Rada during the subsequent VI convocation in 2010, and then served in the Rada up until 2014 as a member of the Party of Regions representing district no. 17. He only attempted to run in the national Verkhovna Rada once, during the 2012 Ukrainian parliamentary elections, submitting his documents on 3 August 2012 to run within district No. 2 (which covered the Kyivskyi district of Simferopol) but ultimately withdrew on 4 October 2012, putting his support instead behind Lev Mirimsky, the founder of Soyuz. During Euromaidan protests, Batalin was part of a delegation to then Prime Minister Mykola Azarov, in which he argued against joining the European Union.

== Political career in Russia ==
Batalin in 2026 during ceremonies after being awarded the title of Hero of Labour of the Russian Federation.

On 9 March 2014, Batalin publicly announced that he supported holding the 2014 Crimean status referendum, which asked voters whether they wished for Crimea to join Russia or remain part of Ukraine, and said that the government of Ukraine was signing agreements with the European Union without consulting Crimea and that this would hurt businesses in the region. Batalin later said he and his plant took part in rallies in support of the referendum, and the subsequent 2014 Russian annexation of Crimea followed the disputed results. However, he did not run for the new Russian-controlled State Council of Crimea, instead choosing to join United Russia and become the chairman of the Russian Union of Industrialists and Entrepreneurs in Crimea. He also became chairman of the Union of Employers of the Republic of Crimea. In late 2014, he eventually joined the Public Chamber of Crimea, and by 2016 was chairing its commission on economic development. In subsequent interviews, Batalin has actively supported Russia, describing himself as Russian and saying he had always been with Russia. During the 2024 Ukrainian presidential election, Batalin registered as a proxy for the candidacy of Vladimir Putin.

== Personal life ==
He is married and has two sons, and has called himself a strict father. His family is Orthodox Christian.

=== Legal issues ===
In March 2015, the Prosecutor's Office of the Autonomous Republic of Crimea, the de jure power of Crimea, announced that Batalin was being put under suspicion of treason and that he would be put on a wanted list by Ukraine under Article 111 Part 1 and Article 110 Part 3 of the Criminal Code of Ukraine. In May 2016, he was summoned by the Prosecutor's Office under Article 111 Part 1 for questioning, and again in October 2017. On 24 October 2017, he was indicted by the Prosecutor's Office on charges of treason, which has a maximum penalty of 15 years if enforced, although he could only be tried in absentia since he still resided in Crimea. The trial was also simultaneously sent to the Kyiv Court of Appeal. Batalin responded to the case by calling it "absolutely meaningless" and said he was glad to be in Russia and that he would not enter Ukraine. After the Prosecutor's Office conviction, he now has indefinite sanctions imposed on him by Ukraine.

== Honours and awards ==
Batalin has been awarded the following honours:

- Order of the Badge of Honour (1977)
- Order of the Red Banner of Labour (1984)
- Honoured Machine Builder of the Ukrainian SSR (1988)
- Order of the Republic of Crimea "For Loyalty to Duty" (2016)
- Order of Friendship (2017)
- Honoured Worker of Industry of the Republic of Crimea (2021)
- Badge of Distinction of the State Council of the Republic of Crimea "For Mercy, Charity and Guardianship" (2024)
- Medal of the Republic of Crimea "For Distinction in Labour" (2026)
- Hero of Labour of the Russian Federation (2026)

In addition, Batalin was formerly awarded the following honours. However, on 22 November 2024, in accordance with Presidential Decree No. 779, all of his awards awarded by Ukraine were revoked by Ukrainian President Volodymyr Zelenskyy as a person under sanctions by the state.

- Honorary Award of the President of Ukraine (1996)
- Order of Merit, II degree (1999)
- Order of Merit, I degree (2003)
- Order of Prince Yaroslav the Wise, V degree (2007)
- Honorary Citizen of Simferopol (2008)
- Hero of Ukraine (Order of the State as a civilian, 2012)
- Honorary Crimean (2013)
