= 2024 Crimean parliamentary election =

- 14 September 2024
- All 75 seats in the State Council of Crimea; 38 seats needed for a majority
Party	Leader	Vote %	Seats	+/–
United Russia	Sergey Aksyonov	74.87	68	+8
LDPR	Leonid Slutsky	5.71	3	−7
CPRF	Sergey Bogatyrenko	5.15	3	−2
SRZP	Sergey Mironov	2.79	1	+1
This lists parties that won seats. See the complete results below.
Chairman of the State Council before	Chairman of the State Council after
Vladimir Konstantinov; United Russia	Vladimir Konstantinov; United Russia

Parliamentary elections took place in the Republic of Crimea, on 6-8 September 2024. These were the third elections since 2014 Russian annexation of Crimea. According to results announced by the Russian authorities, turnout was 47.61% (up from 33.2% in 2019) and United Russia won 74.87% of the vote (up from 54.7% in 2019), winning 68 out of 75 seats available.
