= Yelena Protsenko =

Ukrainian-born Russian politician and lawyer

- Елена Проценко
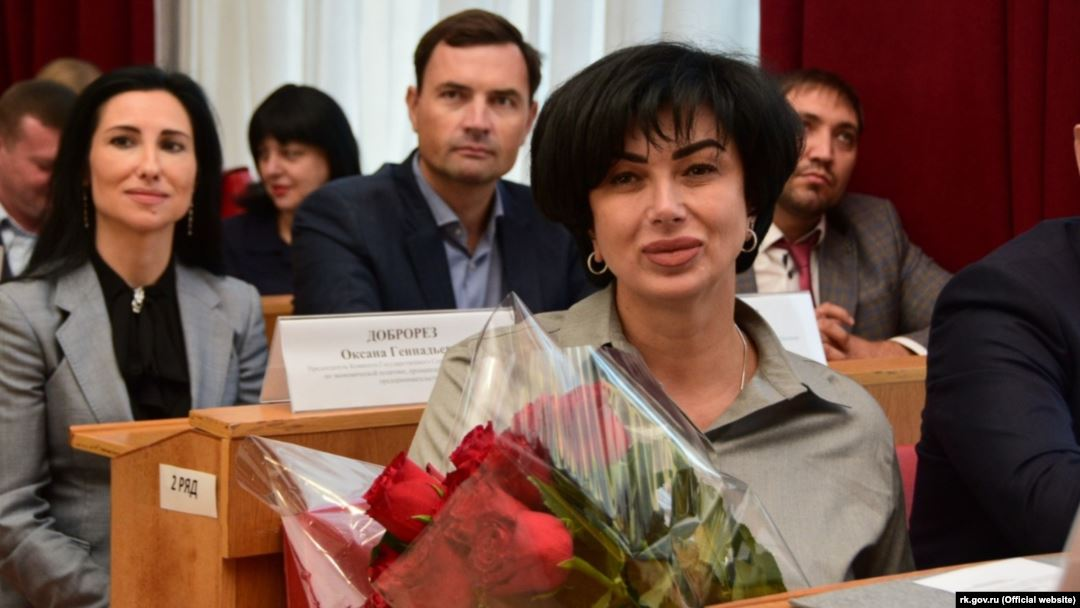

4th Head of Simferopol
- In office 25 October 2019 – 17 February 2021
- Preceded by: Natalya Malenko
- Succeeded by: Valentin Demidov

Personal details
- Born: Yelena Stepanovna Protsenko; 16 April 1968 (age 57) Shepetivka, Khmelnytskyi Oblast, Ukraine, Soviet Union
- Party: United Russia

Yelena Stepanovna Protsenko (Russian: Елена Степановна Проценко; born on 16 April 1968), is a Ukrainian-born Russian politician and lawyer who had served as the 4th head of Simferopol from 2019 to 2021.

== Biography ==
Yelena Protsenko was born on 16 April 1968 in Shepetivka, Khmelnitsky Oblast in Ukraine. She graduated from a trade college. She later graduated from the Vernadsky Taurida National University with a degree in law and jurisprudence.

She began her career after graduating from college. She later held various positions, including leadership.

In July 2017, she has been the head of Municipal Unitary Enterprise Metrograd of the Simferopol city district, which is responsible for the functioning of markets, pedestrian underpasses and some other municipal facilities.

On 25 October 2019, Protsenko was elected the 4th head of Simferopol for five years. According to the election results, she received 80 votes, in second place was Sergey Zyryanov, who scored 74 votes. In total, six applicants took part in the competition.

On 17 February 2021, Protsenko filed a letter of resignation from the post of head of Simferopol at her own request.
