= 2002 Crimean parliamentary election =

← 1998	31 March 2002	2006 →
- All 100 seats in the Verkhovna Rada of Crimea; 51 seats needed for a majority
Party	Seats	+/–
KPU	15	−23
APU	11	+6
NDP	8	+4
Party of Regions	3	New
Russian Bloc	3	New
SDPU(o)	3	New
SelPU	1	New
Labour Ukraine	1	New
PPPU	1	New
Democratic Union	1	New
Independents	46	−1
This lists parties that won seats. See the complete results below.

Parliamentary elections were held in Crimea on 31 March 2002. The Communist Party of Ukraine emerged as the largest faction in the Supreme Council, with 15 of the 100 seats, although 46 seats were won by independents.

== Background ==
Following the 1998 elections, a majoritarian system was introduced that did not ensure the proper representation of the minorities, especially that of the Crimean Tatars, in the Supreme Council.

== Results ==
Party	Seats	+/–
Communist Party of Ukraine	15	–23
Agrarian Party of Ukraine	11	+6
People's Democratic Party	8	+4
Party of Regions	3	New
Russian Bloc	3	New
Social Democratic Party of Ukraine (united)	3	New
Peasant Party of Ukraine	1	New
Labour Ukraine	1	New
Party of Industrialists and Entrepreneurs of Ukraine	1	New
Democratic Union	1	New
Independents	46	–1
Vacant	7	–
Total	100	0
Source: Parties and Elections
