= Valeriy Yermak =

- Валерій Єрмак

Member of the Verkhovna Rada of Crimea
- In office May 2006 – 2010

1st Mayor of Simferopol
- In office April 1990 – May 2006
- Succeeded by: Hennadiy Babenko

Personal details
- Born: Valeriy Fedorovych Yermak; 24 November 1942 Bagayevka, Russia, Soviet Union
- Died: 26 December 2013 (aged 71) Simferopol, Ukraine

Valeriy Fedorovych Yermak (Ukrainian: Валерій Федорович Єрмак; 24 November 1942 - 26 December 2013), was a Russian-born Ukrainian politician who last served as the member of the Verkhovna Rada of Crimea from 2006 to 2010.

Yermak was the 1st Mayor of Simferopol from 1990 to 2006.

== Biography ==
Valeriy Yermak was born on 24 November 1942.

He graduated from school with a gold medal. In 1962, he worked as a carpenter for mechanical column No. 36 in Simferopol. In 1963, he studied from the Sevastopol Instrument-Making Institute, graduating in 1969. From 1966 to 1969, he worked at the Simferopol State Institute for Urban Planning Design (Giprograd) in such positions as a design technician, design engineer and senior architect. From 1969 to 1970 he served in the Soviet Army. Then, Yermak worked in the Kemerovo Glavkuzbasstroy, the plant of the large-panel housebuilding trust Simferopolpromstroy and the Kherson Oblmezhkolkhozstroy, the Simferopol plants Krymzhelezobeton and Ukrvodzhelezobeton. He was involved in the construction of high-rise housing on Marshal Zhukov Street.

He was elected a deputy of the gresovsky village council. In July 1987, he became a member of the Simferopol City Council of People's Deputies, where for five years he held such positions as deputy, first deputy chairman and chairman of the executive committee. From 1993 to 1995 he was the chairman of the executive committee of the Simferopol City Council.

In September 1995, Yermak was elected by the residents of the city as chairman of the Simferopol City Council. In March 1998, he became the mayor of Simferopol in the elections. In 2002, at the election of the mayor, Yermak again took the post of mayor, gaining 53 thousand votes. Before voting in favor of Yermak, candidates Serhiy Shuvainikov and Oleksandr Ryabkov withdrew. Yermak's candidacy was supported by the editors of Krymskaya Pravda, as well as the rector of the TNU Nikolai Bagrov, the chairman of the board of the Fiolent plant Oleksandr Batalin, Hero of the USSR Kostantin Usenko and People's Artist of Ukraine Anatoliy Novikov.

In March 2002, members of the Communist Party suspected Yermak of corrupt ties with the Consol LTD company.

Members of the Communist Party suspected Yermak of corrupt ties with the Consol LTD company. In February 2005, during a meeting of the Simferopol City Council, deputy Valeriy Ivanov from the Progressive Socialist Party cut the wires from the electronic voting board with a kitchen axe. The reason for this act was Yermak's refusal to raise the issue of allocating land plots in an open regime.

In June 2005, a faction of communists in the Simferopol City Council demanded Yermak's resignation in connection with the allocation of land on Franko Boulevard. A couple of months later, the CPU collected more than 50,000 signatures for Yermak's resignation.

During his reign, the airport, railway station and Simferopol station were reconstructed, and land was allocated for the construction of a cathedral mosque on Yaltinskaya Street.

Ermak himself, during the reign of the city, refused to give him this title.

In 2006, he was elected to the Vekrhovna Rada of the Autonomous Republic of Crimea of the 5th convocation from the Soyuz party (3rd number on the list). He advocated the resignation of the Chairman of the Crimean Parliament Anatoliy Hyrtsenko. In 2010, he stopped his political career.

Valeriy Fedorovych Yermak died on 26 December 2013. In the summer of 2015, a monument was erected on his grave at the Abdal cemetery.

In February 2017, Kazansky Square near the building of the City Council of Simferopol was renamed in honor of Valery Yermak.
