= Hennadiy Babenko =

Ukrainian politician (born 1950)

- Геннадій Бабенко

Member of the Verkhovna Rada of Crimea
- In office 11 November 2010 – March 2014

2nd Mayor of Simferopol
- In office May 2006 – 11 November 2010
- Preceded by: Valeriy Yermak
- Succeeded by: Viktor Ahyeyev

Minister of Construction Policy, Architecture, Housing and Communal Services of the Autonomous Republic of Crimea
- In office May 2005 – May 2006

Member of the Verkhovna Rada of Crimea
- In office 1998 – May 2005

Personal details
- Born: Hennadiy Oleksandrovych Babenko; 24 June 1950 (age 75) Mayankovka, Russia, Soviet Union
- Party: Party of Regions(until 2009); United Russia (since 2014)

Hennadiy Oleksandrovych Babenko (Ukrainian: Геннадій Олександрович Бабенко; born on 24 June 1950), is a Russian-born Ukrainian politician who had served as the second mayor of Simferopol from 2006 to 2010. He was also of the Verkhovna Rada of Crimea of the (III, IV and VI convocations), and was the Deputy Chairman of the Council of Ministers of Crimea from 2002 to 2005.

== Biography ==
Hennadiy Babenko was born in Mayankovka, Omsk Oblast on 24 June 1950.

He graduated from secondary school No. 5 in Zhytomyr in 1967. In 1972, he graduated from the Sevastopol Instrument-Making Institute with a degree in radio engineering. He was a member of the Radio Engineering Alumni Association.

In early 1972, he worked as a laboratory assistant at the Leningrad Scientific Research Institute of Television. Then he worked at the Simferopol plant "Fiolent". He was initially an engineer and process engineer, and then was promoted as a deputy secretary and secretary of the Komsomol committee. After that, he became the head of the department of Komsomol organizations of the Simferopol city committee of the Komsomol.

From 1981 to 1983 he studied at the Higher Party School under the Central Committee of the Communist Party of Ukraine in Kyiv. After that, he returned to Simferopol, where he was a party worker. He was an instructor in the organizational department of the central district committee of the party, secretary of the party committee of the production leather and footwear association named after. F. E. Dzerzhinsky, the second, first secretary of the central district committee of the party.

In November 1990, he became chairman of the Central District Council of Simferopol, and from February 1991 to May 1998 he was chairman of the executive committee of that region.

He has been the chairman of the Crimean Baseball and Softball Federation of Ukraine since 1996.

In 1998, he was elected to the Crimean parliament, where he headed the commission for industry, construction, transport, communications and the fuel and energy complex. In 1999 he graduated from the Crimean Institute of Economics and Economic Law with a degree in finance and credit. In 2001, he graduated from the Odesa National Law Academy.

In 2002, he was reelected to the Verkhovna Rada of Crimea. From 2002 to 2005, he was Deputy Chairman of the Crimean Council of Ministers.

On 16 May 2005, he became the Minister of Construction Policy, Architecture, Housing and Communal Services of the ARC in the government of Anatoliy Matviyenko, where he worked for a year.

In March 2006, Babenko ran for the mayor of Simferopol with the support of the Party of Regions, of which he was a member. In the elections, Babenko won 26% of the votes. However, despite this, the Simferopol City Territorial Electoral Commission appointed a repeat election of the mayor. The reason was that Republican Party member Oleksnadr Hress was removed from the ballot on Election Day and reinstated on that list the same day.

The Crimean Court of Appeal recognized that decision as illegal., and ordered to hold reelections of the mayor. Despite this, on 4 June 2006, the Territorial Electoral Commission registered Babenko as the mayor. At the very first meeting, Babenko proposed the candidacy of Volodymyr Blinov, a member of the Russian Bloc, for the position of secretary of the City Council, which was supported by the deputies of the City Council.

On 31 August 2006, Babenko headed the Crimean branch of the Association of Cities of Ukraine. In September 2007, Babenko became a member of the "Community of Siberians in Crimea".

At the end of 2008, there was a split in the Crimean branch of the Party of Regions. The result was that the Simferopol City Council could not hold a meeting due to a conflict between some of the representatives of the Party of Regions and Babenko. Blinov, Secretary of the City Council, became the leader of Babenko's opponents. Member of the faction "For Yanukovych!" Boris Frotman accused Babenko of usurping power and the corruption component of his work. These accusations were supported by deputies of the City Council from the factions of the Yulia Tymoshenko Bloc, the Communist Party, the Soyuz Party, the Russian Bloc and the Ne Tak electoral bloc, who united in the “anti-Babenkov opposition”.

In February 2009, the Political Council of the Party of Regions expelled Babenko from the party.

On 19 March 2009, at a meeting of the City Council, a deputy from the Russian Block party, Nataliya Lantukh, smashed four raw chicken eggs on Babenko's head, protesting against Belov's dismissal. The Zheleznodorozhny District Court found Lantukh guilty of hooliganism and ordered her to pay a fine of 119 hryvnias. The Court of Appeal of the Autonomous Republic of Crimea confirmed that decision.

On 14 September 2009, the Council of the Crimean organization of the Party of Regions expelled Babenko again.

In October 2009, Party of Regions leader Viktor Yanukovych announced that he would not support Babenko in the next mayoral elections in Simferopol.

The head of the head of the Crimean police, Hennadiy Moskal, accused Babenko of making decisions related to the distribution of land and issues of alienation of property, only after agreement "with members of an organized criminal group - Mr. Melnik and Mr. Lukashev.".

During the leadership of Simferopol, Babenko opposed the return of historical names to the streets of Katerininska, Dolhorukovska, Potemkinska, Oleksnadr Nevsky.

He also supported the naming of the Simferopol airport after the pilot Amet-khan Sultan.

In December 2010, Babenko ended up in the intensive care unit of the City Clinical Hospital No. 6 with a diagnosis of a compression fracture of the spine.

From 2010 to 2014, he was a member of the Crimean Parliament. Since October 2011 - Deputy Head of the Department of Service of the Chairman of the Supreme Council of Crimea and his deputies. From February to October 2014, he was the Chairman of the Permanent Commission of the Supreme Council of Crimea on industrial policy, transport, communications and fuel and energy complex.

Since 2014, after the annexation of Crimea, he has been a member of United Russia party.

From 2014 to 2015, he has been the Advisor to the Chairman of the State Council of Crimea.
