= 2019 Crimean parliamentary election =

- 14 September 2019
- All 75 seats in the State Council of Crimea; 38 seats needed for a majority
Party	Leader	Vote %	Seats	+/–
United Russia	Sergey Aksyonov	54.70	60	−10
LDPR	Vladimir Zhirinovsky	16.84	10	+5
CPRF	Sergey Bogatyrenko	8.22	5	+5
This lists parties that won seats. See the complete results below.
Chairman of the State Council before	Chairman of the State Council after
Vladimir Konstantinov; United Russia	Vladimir Konstantinov; United Russia

Parliamentary elections took place in the Republic of Crimea on 8 September 2019. These were the second elections since 2014 Russian annexation of Crimea. The Russian authorities claimed that president Vladimir Putin's United Russia party won 58% of the seats. The party's share of vote fell by half compared to 2014 - from 77% to 38%.
