= Viktor Ahyeyev =

Russian and Ukrainian politician (born 1959)

- Віктор Агєєв
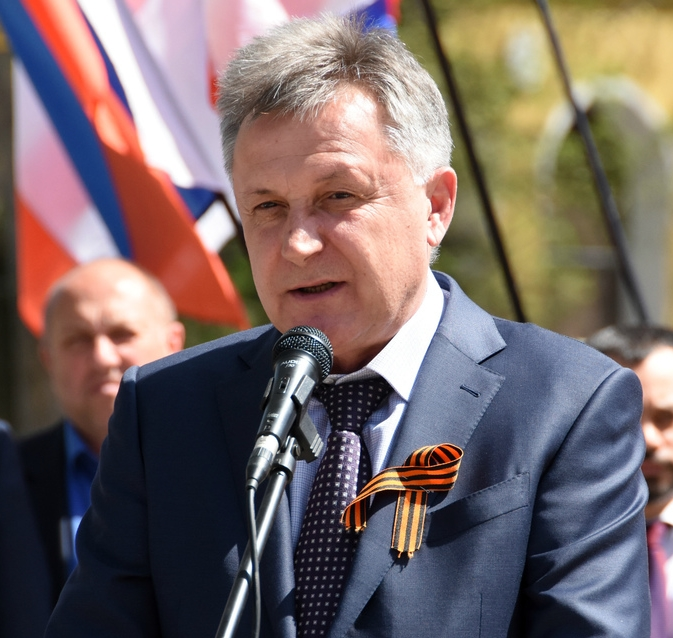
- Ahyeyev in 2018

Head of the Municipal Formation Simferopol City District - Chairman of the Simferopol City Council
- Incumbent
- Assumed office 29 September 2014

3rd Mayor of Simferopol
- In office 11 November 2010 – March 2014
- Preceded by: Hennadiy Babenko
- Succeeded by: Gennady Bakharev (de facto)

Member of the Verkhovna Rada of Crimea
- In office 2002 – 11 November 2010

Personal details
- Born: Viktor Mykoyaylovych Ahyeyev; 17 May 1959 (age 67) Litizh, Russia, Soviet Union
- Party: Party of Regions (until 2014); United Russia
- Awards: Honored Builder of Ukraine

Viktor Mykoyaylovych Ahyeyev (Russian: Виктор Николаевич Агеев; Ukrainian: Віктор Миколайович Агєєв; born on 17 May 1959), is a Russian and Ukrainian politician who is serving as the Head of the Municipal Formation Simferopol City District of the Republic of Crimea - Chairman of the Simferopol City Council since 29 September 2014.

Ahyeyev was the 3rd and final Mayor of Simferopol in the Autonomous Republic of Crimea from 2010 until 2014 before its annexation to Russia.

== Biography ==
Viktor Ahyeyev was born in Litizh, Bryansk Oblast on 17 May 1959.

In 1981, he graduated from the Kharkov Institute of Mechanization and Electrification of Agriculture with a degree in electrification of agriculture. Ahyeyev began his career in 1981 as an electrical engineer at the state farm named after. Gagarin in the Kharkiv Oblast.

From 1983 to 1984 he worked as an engineer at the Simferopolsky Experimental Greenhouse Complex in Simferopol.

From 1985 to 1987 he served in the Soviet Army. After completing his service, he worked for 5 years as a power engineer at the Krymnerudprom Production Association.

From 1992 to 2000, he worked in various positions at the Konsol company. For the next two years, he held the position of General Director of Konsol LTD LLC.

Between December 2002 and May 2006, he was the deputy chairman of the Board of the Ukrrosbud Corporation.

In 2002, he was elected as a member of the Verkhovna Rada of Crimea in the majoritarian district. In the same year, Viktor Nikolaevich received the title of Honored Builder of the Autonomous Republic of Crimea. Four years later, in 2006, he was reelected to the regional parliament.

In 2005, he graduated from the Kharkiv Regional Institute of Public Administration of the National Academy of Public Administration under the President of Ukraine with a degree in public administration and received a master's degree in public administration.

In May 2006, he has been Chairman of the Standing Committee of the Verkhovna Rada of Crimea for Industry, Construction, Transport, Communications and the Fuel and Energy Complex. In 2007, Ahyeyev received the title of Honored Builder of Ukraine.

On 7 November 2010, Ahyeyev was elected the 3rd Mayor of Simferopol. He officially took office on 11 November.

On 29 September 2014, after the annexation of Crimea, Ahyeyev was elected the head of the municipality of the city district of Simferopol of the Republic of Crimea - the chairman of the Simferopol city council.

== Awards ==
- Medal “For Valiant Labor” (Republic of Crimea, 29 October 2015) — for significant contribution to strengthening unity, the socio-economic and cultural development of the Republic of Crimea, many years of dedicated work, high professionalism, active civic position, and in connection with the Day of National Unity.
- Order of Prince Yaroslav the Wise (2019).
- Order “For Loyalty to Duty” (Republic of Crimea, 2019).

== Family ==
He is married to Nataliya and has four children. Nataliya is the daughter of Valeriy Yermak, who led Simferopol for sixteen years.
