= Gennady Bakharev =

Russian and former Ukrainian politician

- Геннадий Бахарев
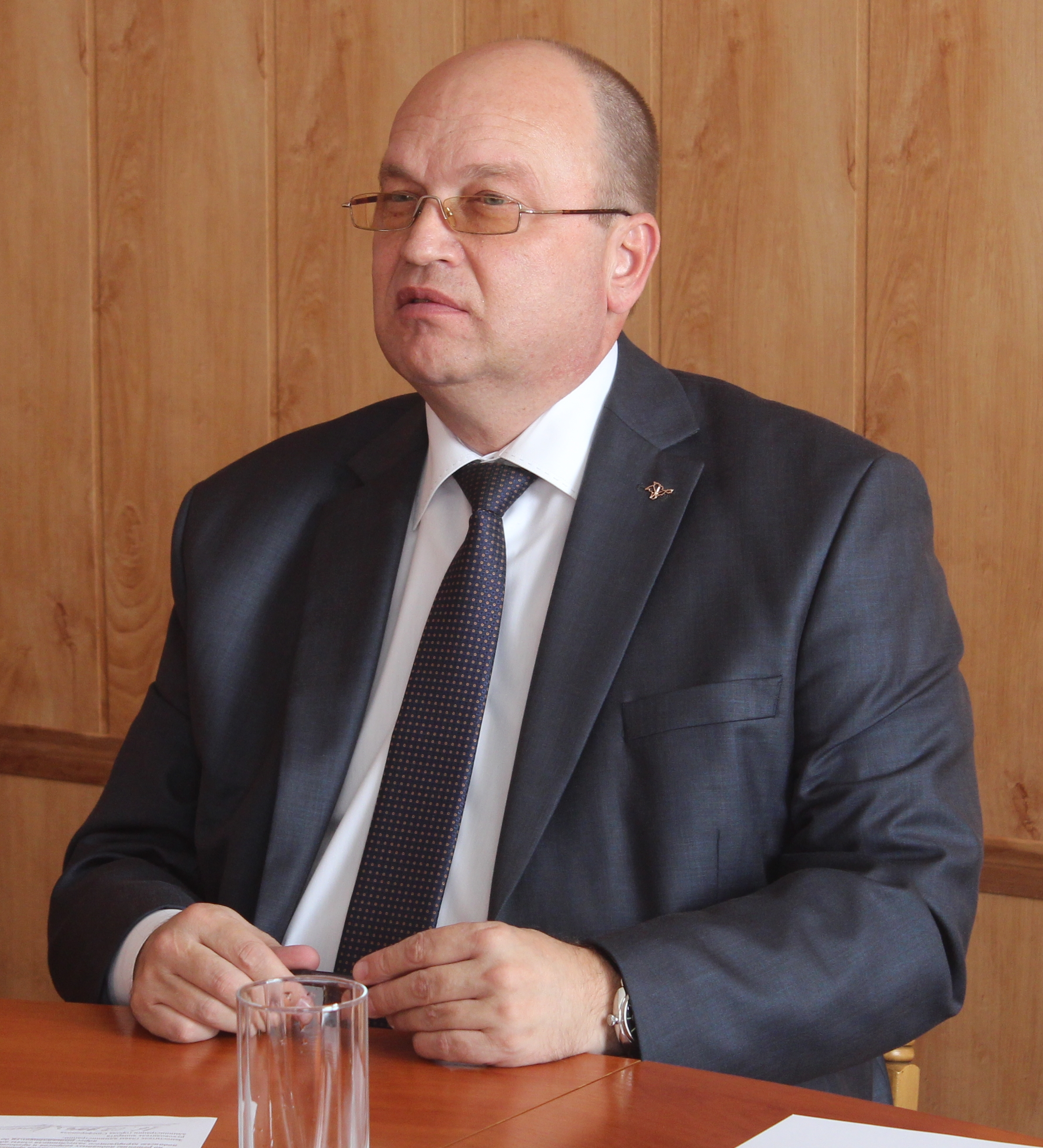
- Bakharev in 2016

1st Head of Simferopol
- In office 18 November 2014 – 29 August 2017
- Preceded by: Viktor Ahyeyev (de jure)
- Succeeded by: Igor Lukashyov

Head of Simferopol (acting) (de facto)
- In office September 2014 – 18 November 2014

Personal details
- Born: Hennadiy Serhiyovych Barkharyev; 7 June 1963 (age 62) Simferopol, Crimea, Soviet Union
- Party: United Russia; Party of Regions (until 2014)

Gennady Sergeyevich Bakharev (Russian: Геннадий Сергеевич Бахарев; Ukrainian: Геннадій Сергійович Бахарєв; born on 7 June 1963), is a Russian and former Ukrainian politician who had served as the 1st Head of Simferopol from 2014 to 2017 in annexed Crimea.

== Biography ==
Gennady Bakharev was born Hennadiy Serhiyovych Barkharyev in Simferopol, Crimea on 7 June 1963.

He graduated from Taurida National University named after V. I. Vernadsky with a degree in Finance and Credit.

From August 1980 to November 1981, he worked as a radio equipment assembler and a toolmaker at the Foton TV factory in Simferopol.

From November 1981 to December 1983, he served in the Soviet Army.

From 1984 to 1990, he continued to work as a toolmaker at the Simferopol TV factory "Photon". From 1990 to 1996 he worked in the Molot cooperative in Simferopol. He went from a locksmith to the head of production with a further appointment as chairman of the cooperative.

From 1997 to 1999, he worked as Deputy General Director of JV "Simplex LTD" in Simferopol, then was appointed General Director of the enterprise.

From 2000 to 2004, he held the position of deputy director for Commerce and Marketing of the Krasnopartizansky winery. From 2004 to 2005, he worked as a mechanical engineer at Agrofirma Zolotaya Balka LLC in Sevastopol. From 2005 to 2006, he held the position of deputy director of CJSC Berdyansk Winery.

In 2006, he worked as Deputy Chairman of the Zheleznodorozhny District Council on the activities of the executive bodies of the Council of the city of Simferopol.

From 2006 to 2014, he was the Deputy of the Zheleznodorozhny District Council of Simferopol V, VI convocations. In December 2006, he was appointed chairman of the Zheleznodorozhny District Council.

From May to September 2014, he served as Chairman of the Simferopol Regional State Administration. In September 2014, Bakharev became the acting head of the administration of Simferopol. On 18 November 2014, he was elected to the post of head of Simferopol.

In March 2016, Bakharev took 84th place out of 88 participants in the “Rating of Mayors” survey of the Rating Information Communications Center.

In August 2017, he left the post of head of the city.

One of the main objects of criticism of Bakharev during his term was the reconstruction of the city center.

== Awards ==
- Commendation from the Chairman of the Council of Ministers of the Autonomous Republic of Crimea (2010);
- Honorary title “Honored Worker of Local Self-Government in the Autonomous Republic of Crimea” (2011);
- Medal of the Republic of Crimea “For Valiant Labor” (July 2015) — for many years of diligent work, high professionalism, and active civic engagement;
- Medal “For Officer’s Honor” (awarded by “Officers of Russia” LLC, June 2015) — for consistent actions aimed at fostering patriotism among the population and reviving the best traditions of Russian officerhood;
- Badge of Distinction “Medal of Saint George” (Order No. 707 of December 7, 2016) — for courage shown during the “Crimean Spring,” for protecting the constitutional rights of Crimeans during the preparation and holding of the all-Crimean referendum on the status and state affiliation of the Republic of Crimea, for outstanding service in preserving the memory of the People’s Militia, and for ongoing support in matters of military-patriotic education of youth;
- Medal “Reunification of Crimea and Sevastopol with Russia” (awarded by the Regional Public Organization of Veterans of the Ministry of Internal Affairs and Internal Troops in the Republic of Crimea, May 2017).

== Family ==
He is married and has two children.
