= For Peace and Stability (parliamentary group) =

2014 parliamentary group in Ukraine

For Peace and Stability За мир і стабільність За мир и стабильность
- Leader: Vitaly Hrushevskiy; Yevgeny Balitsky; Oleksandr Prysyazhnyuk
- Founded: 2 July 2014
- Dissolved: 27 November 2014
- Split from: Party of Regions; Communist Party of Ukraine
- Ideology: Patriotism; Democratic socialism Federalism
- Verkhovna Rada (2014): 36 / 450

For Peace and Stability (Ukrainian: За мир і стабільність, romanized: Za myr i stabilnist, Russian: За мир и стабильность, romanized: Za mir i stabil'nost') was a parliamentary faction in the Verkhovna Rada (parliament of Ukraine) from 2 July 2014 to 27 November 2014. The group included 34 MPs.

== History ==
For Peace and Stability was created by MPs Vitaly Grushevskii, Yevgeny Balitsky and Oleksandr Prysiazhniuk. Prysiazhniuk had just left the faction of the Communist Party of Ukraine the day before. Balitskii and Grushevskii were former MPs of Party of Regions. Balitskii and Grushevskii had left the faction of Party of regions on 3 June 2014. Almost all of the other members were also former MPs of Party of Regions and a few former MPs for the Communist Party. Lev Mirimsky of the party Union was also a member of the faction. Mirimsky is one of the five MPs from the 10 MPs elected in the Autonomous Republic of Crimea during the 2012 Ukrainian parliamentary election that became a member of the faction. (Note: The status of Crimea and of the city of Sevastopol is since March 2014 under dispute between Russia and Ukraine; Ukraine and the majority of the international community consider Crimea to be an autonomous republic of Ukraine and Sevastopol to be one of Ukraine's cities with special status, while Russia, on the other hand, considers Crimea to be a federal subject of Russia and Sevastopol to be one of Russia's three federal cities.)

The parliamentary group was not revived after the 2014 parliamentary elections in Ukraine and thus ceased to exist at 27 November 2014, the first day of the parliament elected in 2014.

== Members ==
Verkhovna Rada
Year	Party-list			Constituency /total	Overall seats won	Seat change	Government	Ref
Year	Popular vote	%	Seats /total	Constituency /total	Overall seats won	Seat change	Government	Ref
2014					36 / 450			(in Ukrainian)

=== Party affiliation ===
- Party of Regions (former members)
- Communist Party of Ukraine (former members)
- Party "Union"
