= 2014 Crimean parliamentary election =

State election after annexation by Russia

- 14 September 2014
- All 75 seats in the State Council of Crimea; 38 seats needed for a majority
Party	Leader	Vote %	Seats
United Russia	Sergey Aksyonov	72.76	70
LDPR	Vladimir Zhirinovsky	8.80	5
This lists parties that won seats. See the complete results below.
Chairman of the State Council before	Chairman of the State Council after
Vladimir Konstantinov; United Russia	Vladimir Konstantinov; United Russia

Parliamentary elections took place in the Republic of Crimea on 14 September 2014. These were the first elections since Russian annexation of Crimea on 18 March. The outcome was an overwhelming victory for President Vladimir Putin's United Russia party.

== Background ==
On 17 April 2014, after the annexation, Russian president Putin submitted a draft law on parliamentary elections in Crimea and Sevastopol to the State Duma, setting 14 September 2014 as the election date. On this day also election were held in 30 Russian regions and 14 regional (Russian) legislatures.

== Electoral system ==
According to Crimean State Council Chairman Vladimir Konstantinov, the elections would be conducted according to a mixed system. Fifty deputies were to be elected on party-list proportional representation and 25 in majority constituencies.

Russian Central Election Commission Chairman Vladimir Churov said that the commission filed a request for funding with the government for 400 million roubles to conduct the election.

On 9 September 2014 Head of the Republic of Crimea Sergey Aksyonov announced that Crimean residents "who did not manage to obtain a passport of the Russian Federation" would be able to participate in the elections using their "Ukrainian local registration".

== Issues ==
The local Crimean Tatars had called for a boycott of the elections.

Opposition figures in Crimea complained that they were deprived of a chance to win seats because of "Administrative resource-tactics" that made sure unapproved challengers would have no chance of gaining traction.

The United Nations Office of the High Commissioner for Human Rights (OHCHR) identified a situation of multiple and continuing human-rights violations in Crimea after the start of the Russian occupation. It found the situation when Russia held its election was marked by persistent intimidation that targeted those who had opposed the annexation "referendum" or were critical of de-facto "authorities", as well as Crimea's Indigenous Crimean Tatar nation, which caused increasing numbers to leave the peninsula. The intimidation included waves of forced disappearances, intrusive searches, and criminalization of the Crimean Tatars' national body, the Mejlis.

The OHCHR also noted that the participation of residents of Crimea in Ukraine's parliamentary elections of 26 October were limited by the need to travel to mainland Ukraine to vote, the burden of crossing administrative checkpoints from the occupied territory and back, and the fear of possible reprisals from the so-called authorities. Voters were summoned by Crimean police for "conversations" warning about "extremist activities", and had their personal data recorded by "Crimean self-defence" while leaving Russian-controlled territory. Only 2,800 Crimean voters voted in the parliamentary election, or 0.2% of pre-annexation registered voters In Ukraine's 25 May presidential elections, 6,000 Crimean residents had voted according to the Central Election Commission.

== Results ==
According to the election commission's reported results, only two parties overcame the election threshold: of the council's 75 seats, United Russia won 70 mandates because its candidates won in all 25 single-member constituencies and it won 71.06% of the party-list vote; the other 5 mandates went to the Liberal Democratic Party of Russia which won 8.14% of the party-list vote. Voter turnout was 54% according to the commission.

Russian media reported that 803 candidates had tried to win seats; 108 candidates in one of the single-member constituencies and the rest as candidates as member of 12 political parties.

Party	Votes	%	Seats		
Party	Votes	%	Party-list	Constituency	Total
United Russia	515,926	72.76	45	25	70
Liberal Democratic Party of Russia	62,380	8.80	5	0	5
Communist Party of the Russian Federation	32,952	4.65	0	0	0
Rodina	19,479	2.75	0	0	0
Communists of Russia	15,480	2.18	0	0	0
Russian Party of Pensioners for Social Justice	14,220	2.01	0	0	0
A Just Russia – For Truth	13,546	1.91	0	0	0
Democratic Party of Russia	9,723	1.37	0	0	0
Patriots of Russia	8,634	1.22	0	0	0
Communist Party of Social Justice	6,199	0.87	0	0	0
Russian Ecological Party "The Greens"	5,872	0.83	0	0	0
Party of Veterans of Russia	4,645	0.66	0	0	0
Total	709,056	100.00	50	25	75
Valid votes	709,056	96.45			
Invalid/blank votes	26,090	3.55			
Total votes	735,146	100.00			
Registered voters/turnout	1,372,655	53.56			
Source: Crimea Electoral Commission
