= List of chairmen of the State Council of Crimea =

Chairman of the State Council of the Republic of Crimea Председатель Государственного Совета Республики Крым
- Coat of arms of Crimea

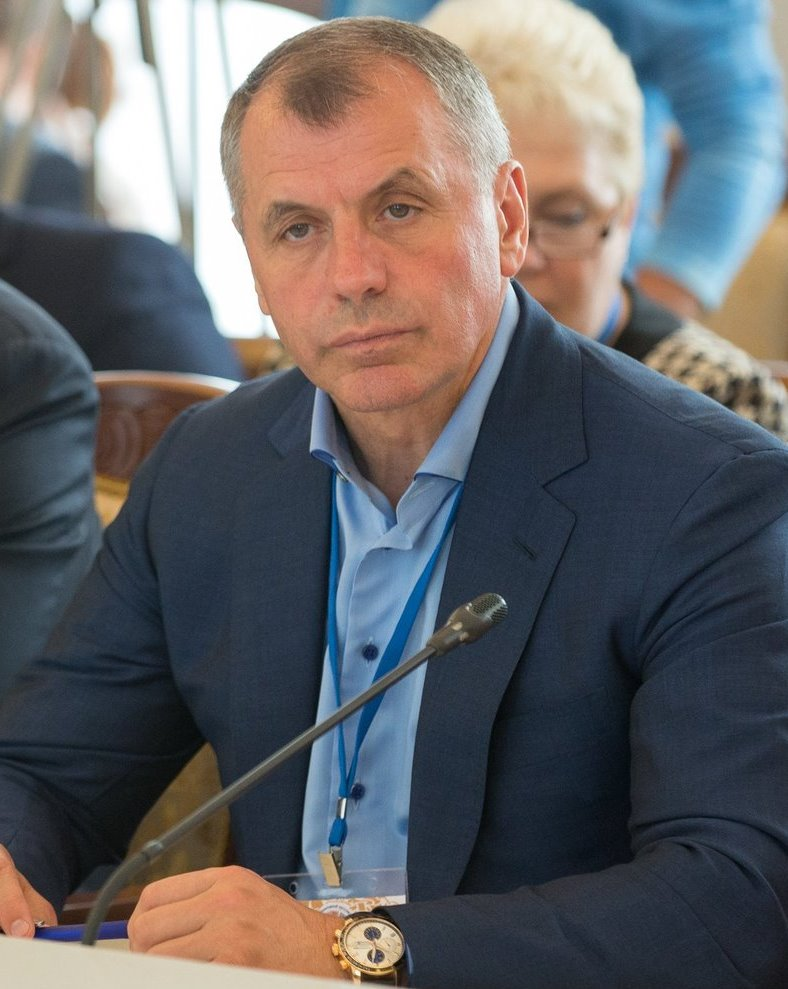
- Incumbent; Vladimir Konstantinov since March 17, 2014
- Inaugural holder: Vladimir Konstantinov
- Formation: March 17, 2014
- Succession: First Deputy Chairman
- Website: http://www.rada.crimea.ua/

This is a list of chairmen of the State Council of Crimea:

Name	Period	Party
Vladimir Konstantinov	March 17, 2014 – Present	UR
