= 1998 Crimean parliamentary election =

Parliamentary elections were held in Crimea on 29 March 1998. The Communist Party of Ukraine emerged as the largest faction in the Supreme Council, with 38 of the 100 seats, although 47 seats were won by independents.

== Electoral system ==
Prior to the elections, an amendment to the electoral law introduced a majoritarian system.

== Results ==
As a result of the new electoral system, Crimean Tatars failed to win any seats in the Supreme Council.

Party	Seats	+/–
Communist Party of Ukraine	38	+36
Agrarian Party of Ukraine	5	New
Soyuz	4	New
People's Democratic Party	4	New
Party of Economic Revival	1	–2
Socialist Party of Ukraine	1	New
Independents	47	+27
Total	100	0
Source: Parties and Elections
