= Soyuz (political party) =

Party "Soyuz" Партія "Союз" Партий "Союз"
- Founded: 11 June 1997
- Headquarters: Kyiv
- Ideology: Crimean regionalism Russophilia
- Political position: Big tent
- Colours: Blue
- Verkhovna Rada: 0 / 450
- Supreme Council of Crimea (until 2014): 5 / 100

The Party "Soyuz" (Ukrainian: Партія "Союз", Russian: Партия "Союз") is a pro-Russian political party in Ukraine that was mostly based in Crimea until 2014. (Note: Since the annexation of Crimea by the Russian Federation, the status of the Crimea and of the city of Sevastopol is under dispute between Russia and Ukraine; Ukraine and the majority of the international community considers the Crimea and Sevastopol an integral part of Ukraine, while Russia, on the other hand, considers the Crimea and Sevastopol an integral part of Russia, with Sevastopol functioning as a federal city (Russian authorities are in control of both).) It was registered in June 1997 under a registration number 867.

== History ==
The party was founded in 1997 by Lev Mirimsky, one of the richest people of Crimea at the time. The Constituent Party Congress took place on March 15, 1997. Svitlana Savchenko was elected the leader of the party. The congress also adopted the party's program and statute. The party was formed on the basis of the prohibited Crimean Party.

The Second Party Congress (October 4, 1997) took place in the city of Simferopol. At the congress the party's pre-election program was adopted.

At the Third Party Congress (November 16, 1997), the congress confirmed the list of deputies for the next elections which was registered with Central Election Commission on December 18, 1997.

At the Fourth Party Congress (July 11, 1998), the Congress reviewed the election campaign of the party and made some changes to the party's Political council and its statute. The party's flag was adopted as well. The flag represented by a white field (1x2 m) with a dark-blue circle in the middle where a friendly handshake of two hands is depicted. The top and bottom edges of the flag covered by red lanes in 1/8 of the flag's width.

During the 2004 Ukrainian presidential election the party supported Viktor Yanukovych.

The party won 1 seat in the Ukrainian parliament in the 2012 Ukrainian parliamentary election. Lev Mirimsky won electoral district number 2, located in Simferopol, with 36,45% of the vote.

Following the March 2014 Russian annexation of Crimea party leader Lev Mirimsky and his family moved to Kyiv. (Where he spoke publicly against the annexation.)

In the October 2014 Ukrainian parliamentary election, the party won no parliamentary seats.

Mirimsky suddenly died of a heart-attack on 27 April 2017 (at the age of 57). He was buried at Kyiv's Baikove Cemetery.

=== Election results ===
During the 1998 Ukrainian parliamentary election the party balloting independently won 0.70% of the national vote. Prior to the parliamentary elections of 2002 Lev Myrymsky stated that the party already had two of its representatives in the Verkhovna Rada although officially in proportional representation the party did not win seats in the national parliament and only won a single seat by a single-seat constituency according to the official statistics from the Central Electoral Commission. At the 2002 Ukrainian parliamentary election the party was part of the Russian Bloc that got 0.73% of the votes and no seats. 2006 Ukrainian parliamentary election the party was a member of the bloc "For Union"; the bloc won 0.20% of the votes. In the 30 September 2007 elections, the party again failed as part of the Electoral Bloc of Political Parties "KUCHMA" to win parliamentary representation.

During the 2010 Ukrainian local elections the party won representatives in municipalities in Crimea and 5 seats (out of 100 total seats) in the Supreme Council of Crimea.

In the 2012 Ukrainian parliamentary election the party won 1 constituency seat (in constituency 2 located in Simferopol; it had competed in 13 constituencies) and thus parliamentary representation by Lev Myrymsky who had scored 36.45% of the votes. The parties second best results was in constituency 35 (located in Pavlohrad) with 4.32%. In the other constituencies it did not score better than 3%, and in most cases scored below 1%. Myrymsky did not join a faction in the Verkhovna Rada (Parliament) till he joined the then newly created faction For Peace and Stability on 2 July 2014.

In the 2014 parliamentary election the party did not compete on the nationwide party list and also did not win a constituency seat and thus no parliamentary seats.

== Political positions ==
The party wants Ukraine to join the Eurasian Economic Union. It advocates for the restoration of the Russian language to state language status (previously both Ukrainian and Russian were state languages). The party is against Ukraine joining NATO, the rehabilitation of Nazi ideology and its supporters from the UNA-UNSO and "against the omnipotence of bureaucrats and corruption".

In October 2009, the Crimean branch of the party asked Russian president Dmitry Medvedev, Russian prime minister Vladimir Putin and chief executive of Gazprom Alexei Miller to consider the issue of possible deliveries of natural gas to Crimea and Sevastopol in 2009–2010 at prices charged to citizens of Russia.

However, Party leader Lev Mirimsky also spoke publicly against the 2014 Russian annexation of Crimea, and in the wake of the annexation the party adopted an anti-annexation perspective.

== See also ==
- Soyuz (faction)
