= Vladimir Konstantinov (politician) =

Chairman of the State Council of Crimea since 2014

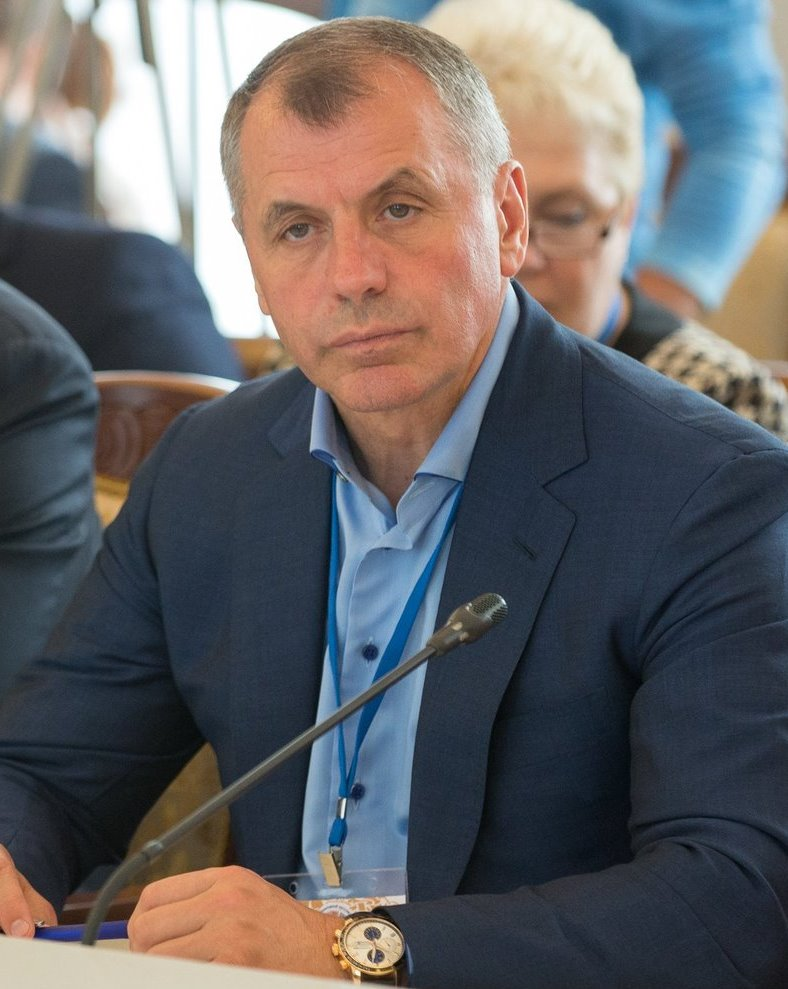

Chairman of the State Council of Republic of Crimea
- Incumbent
- Assumed office 17 March 2014
- President: Vladimir Putin
- Head of the Republic: Sergey Aksyonov
- Preceded by: Office established

Chairman of the Verkhovna Rada of the Autonomous Republic of Crimea
- In office 17 March 2010 – 17 March 2014
- President: Viktor Yanukovych
- Prime Minister: Vasyl Dzharty; Pavlo Burlakov (Acting); Anatolii Mohyliov; Sergey Aksyonov
- Preceded by: Anatoliy Hrytsenko
- Succeeded by: Office abolished

Member of the Verkhovna Rada of the Autonomous Republic of Crimea
- In office 29 March 1998 – 17 March 2014

Personal details
- Born: 19 November 1956 (age 69) Vladimirovca, Moldavian SSR, Soviet Union
- Party: Party of Regions (until 7 April 2014); United Russia (since 7 April 2014)
- Education: Sevastopol Instrument-Making Institute

Vladimir Andreyevich Konstantinov (Russian: Владимир Андреевич Константинов, Ukrainian: Володимир Андрійович Константинов; born 19 November 1956) is a Crimean and Russian politician who has served as the Chairman of the State Council of the Republic of Crimea since 17 March 2014 year.

Chairman of the Supreme Rada of the Autonomous Republic of Crimea from March 17, 2010, to March 17, 2014. Member of the Supreme Rada of the Autonomous Republic of Crimea (1998-2014).

Knight of the Order of Merit for the Fatherland, First Class (2014). Honored Builder of Ukraine (1999). Honorary Citizen of the Republic of Crimea (2014). Honored Builder of the Autonomous Republic of Crimea (1999).

Laureate of the State Prize of Ukraine in the field of architecture (2006). He was awarded the Order of Merit of the III, II and I degrees (2001, 2004, 2006), the Order of Prince Yaroslav the Wise of the V and IV degrees (2007, 2011).

Honorary Professor at the Crimean Institute of Environmental Protection and Resort Construction (2014).

He was Chairman of the Association's Standing Committee on European Integration, Cross-border and Interregional Cooperation from 2011 to 2014.

== Biography ==
He was born in Vladimirovca in the Moldavian SSR (present-day Moldova/Transnistria) on 19 November 1956.

From 1981 to 1991 he worked as a foreman, work supervisor, chief engineer, and head of the Crimean specialized repair and construction department of the «Ukrremstroymaterialy trust».

From September to November 2001 he was the Chairman of the Board of Consol, Ltd.

From December 2001 to August 2004 he was the Chairman of the Ukrrosbud corporation.

From August 2004 to March 2010 he was the President of the Ukrrosbud Corporation.

He is an honorary professor at the Crimean National Academy of Environmental and Resort Construction.

In 2014 he became a member of the State Council of the Republic of Crimea.

== Alleged criminal involvement ==
Andriy Senchenko, member of the Verkhovna Rada (Supreme Council of Ukraine) from Batkivshchyna party led by Yulia Tymoshenko, has alleged in March 2014 that Vladimir Konstatinov has been involved in fraudulent real estate transactions and that he has worked since the 1990s with Prime Minister Sergey Aksyonov, whom Senchenko alleged to be a member of organized crime.

== Awards ==
- Order of Merit, II degree (2004);
- Order of Merit, 1st Class (2006)
- Order of Prince Yaroslav the Wise, 5th Class (2007)
- Order of Prince Yaroslav the Wise, 4th Class (2011)

Political offices
Preceded by Anatoliy Hrytsenko	Chairman of the Supreme Council of Crimea; 2010–2014	Succeeded by Office abolished
Preceded by Office established	Chairman of the State Council of the Republic of Crimea; 2014–present	Succeeded by Incumbent
