= State Council of Crimea =

Regional parliament of Russian-administered Crimea

Coordinates: 44°57′6″N 34°5′49″E

State Council of Crimea: Государственный Совет Крыма; Державна Рада Криму; Къырым Девлет Шурасы
- 3rd convocation

Type
- Type: Unicameral of Republic of Crimea (Russia)

History
- Founded: 17 March 2014
- Preceded by: Supreme Council of Crimea

Leadership
- Chairman: Vladimir Konstantinov, United Russia since 17 March 2014

Structure
- Seats: 75
- Political groups: United Russia (68); LDPR (3); CPRF (3); SR-ZP (1)

Elections
- Voting system: Parallel voting: Party-list proportional representation: 50 seats; First-past-the-post voting: 25 seats
- First election: 14 September 2014
- Last election: 8 September 2024
- Next election: 2029

Meeting place
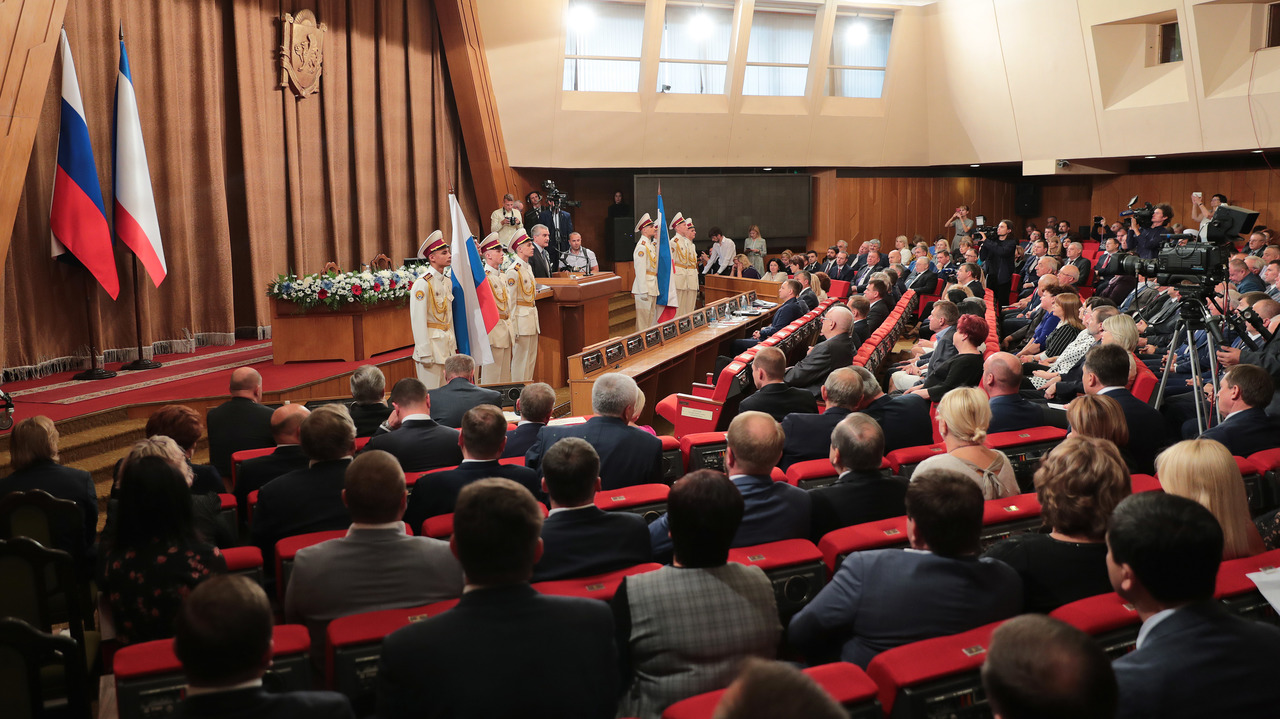
- Building of the State Council of Crimea, Simferopol

Website
- www.crimea.gov.ru

The State Council of Crimea is the regional legislature established by Russia for the Republic of Crimea, a federal subject claimed by Russia on the territory of Ukraine's Autonomous Republic of Crimea. The unicameral council has 75 members and meets in Simferopol.

Russia has controlled Crimea since its occupation and annexation of the peninsula in 2014. Ukraine and most of the international community continue to recognize Crimea as part of Ukraine. In March 2014, the United Nations General Assembly affirmed Ukraine's territorial integrity within its internationally recognized borders and called on states and international organizations not to recognize a change in the status of Crimea resulting from the referendum held on 16 March 2014.

The council was established on 17 March 2014 as the Russian-controlled successor to the Supreme Council of Crimea, whose powers had been terminated by the Verkhovna Rada of Ukraine two days earlier. Vladimir Konstantinov, the final chairman of the Supreme Council, became chairman of the State Council. Elections under Russian administration were held in 2014, 2019 and 2024. Ukraine and the European Union do not recognize the legitimacy of those elections in Crimea.

== History ==
=== Predecessor ===
Before 2014, the regional legislature of the Autonomous Republic of Crimea was the Supreme Council of Crimea. It was a 100-member unicameral body that operated under the constitutions and laws of Ukraine and the autonomous republic. Its final election was held in October 2010.

Vladimir Konstantinov chaired the Supreme Council from 2010 until the Ukrainian parliament terminated the body's powers on 15 March 2014. He subsequently became chairman of the State Council established under Russian administration.

=== Establishment in 2014 ===
On 27 February 2014, armed men wearing uniforms without identifying insignia seized the buildings of the Supreme Council and the Crimean Council of Ministers in Simferopol. Contemporary reports described the men as carrying automatic weapons and said that Russian flags were raised over the occupied buildings.

Members of the legislature were subsequently permitted to enter the parliament building for an emergency session. During the session, the Supreme Council dismissed the government headed by Anatolii Mohyliov and appointed Sergey Aksyonov, leader of the Russian Unity party, as chairman of the Council of Ministers. The legislature also scheduled a referendum on Crimea's status.

Questions were subsequently raised about the number of deputies present at the emergency session and whether all electronically recorded votes had been cast by the deputies to whom the voting cards had been issued. The available contemporary accounts reported conflicting numbers for attendance. (Note: Contemporary reporting variously stated that 64 deputies were registered as present and that only 36 deputies had physically attended. The precise attendance and manner in which the electronic votes were cast remained disputed.)

On 11 March, the Verkhovna Rada of Ukraine stated that the Crimean legislature's decision to conduct a referendum contradicted several provisions of the Constitution of Ukraine and demanded that it be withdrawn. The Ukrainian parliament warned that it would consider terminating the Crimean legislature's powers if the decision was not rescinded.

On 15 March, the Verkhovna Rada of Ukraine terminated the powers of the Supreme Council of Crimea. The resolution took effect upon its adoption. Contemporary reporting stated that 278 members of the Ukrainian parliament voted in favor, with one abstention.

The referendum was held on 16 March while Russian forces controlled the peninsula. The authorities administering Crimea announced that accession to Russia had received majority support. On 17 March, the legislature declared Crimea independent, adopted the name State Council of Crimea and requested admission to the Russian Federation. Russia signed a treaty claiming the annexation of Crimea on 18 March.

On 27 March, the United Nations General Assembly adopted Resolution 68/262 by 100 votes to 11, with 58 abstentions. The resolution affirmed Ukraine's territorial integrity within its internationally recognized borders, stated that the referendum had not been authorized by Ukraine and called on states and international organizations not to recognize a change in Crimea's status resulting from it.

=== Russian-administered period ===
The first election to the 75-member State Council under Russian law was conducted on 14 September 2014. United Russia won 70 seats and the Liberal Democratic Party won five. A second election was held on 8 September 2019.

The European Union stated that it did not recognize Russia's annexation of Crimea or the conduct of the 2019 elections on the peninsula. It also stated that those elected under Russian administration would not be recognized as representatives of Crimea or Sevastopol.

Elections for a third convocation were conducted from 6 to 8 September 2024. The European Union condemned the vote, stated that it had been conducted by Russia on Ukrainian territory, and said that neither the election nor its results would be recognized.

== Legal status ==
Under Russian law, the State Council is the legislature of the Republic of Crimea, which Russia treats as one of its federal subjects. The council operates under the constitution adopted by the Russian-controlled Crimean authorities and under applicable Russian federal legislation.

Ukraine does not recognize the Republic of Crimea or the State Council as lawful replacements for the Autonomous Republic of Crimea and its Supreme Council. Ukraine continues to regard Crimea as an integral part of its territory under temporary Russian occupation.

The United Nations General Assembly has affirmed Ukraine's sovereignty, political independence, unity and territorial integrity within its internationally recognized borders. Resolution 68/262 called on states, international organizations and specialized agencies not to recognize changes to the status of Crimea or Sevastopol resulting from the March 2014 referendum.

The European Union does not recognize Russia's annexation of Crimea and has rejected the validity of elections conducted under Russian administration on the peninsula. In response to the September 2024 elections, the EU stated that the vote and its results were null and void and could not produce legal effects.

== Composition and factions ==
Following the 2024 election, the results announced by the Russian-administered authorities gave United Russia 68 of the council's 75 seats. The Liberal Democratic Party and the Communist Party each received three seats, while A Just Russia – For Truth received one.

Composition of the third convocation
Party	Seats
United Russia	68
Liberal Democratic Party of Russia	3
Communist Party of the Russian Federation	3
A Just Russia – For Truth	1
Total	75

== Leadership ==
The State Council is headed by a chairman, who presides over its sittings and represents the legislature in its relations with other authorities. Its presidium includes the chairman, the first deputy chairman and deputy chairmen.

Vladimir Konstantinov has served as chairman of the State Council since its establishment in March 2014. He previously served as chairman of the Supreme Council of Crimea from 2010 until the Ukrainian parliament terminated that body's powers in March 2014.

== Elections ==
=== 2014 ===
On 14 September 2014 → two factions were formed at the opening session of the new parliament formed after the 2014 Crimean parliamentary election.

Party	%	Seats
United Russia	72.76	70
Liberal Democratic Party of Russia	8.80	5
Communist Party of the Russian Federation	8.80	0
Rodina	2.75	0
Communists of Russia	2.18	0
Russian Party of Pensioners for Social Justice	2.01	0
Registered voters/turnout		

Only two parties overcame the election threshold: United Russia won 70 mandates of the Crimean Republic's State Council 75 seats because its candidates won in all 25 single-member constituencies and it won 71.06% of the party-list vote; the other 5 mandates went to the Liberal Democratic Party of Russia who won 8.14% of the party-list vote. The voter turnout was 53.61%.

803 candidates had tried to win seats; 108 candidates in one of the single-member constituencies and the rest as candidates as member of 12 political parties.

=== 2019 ===
On 14 September 2019 → three factions were formed at the opening session of the new parliament formed after the 2019 Crimean parliamentary election.

Party	%	Seats
United Russia	54.70	60
Liberal Democratic Party of Russia	16.84	10
Communist Party of the Russian Federation	8.22	5
Registered voters/turnout		

== 2024 ==
Party	%	Seats
United Russia	74.87	68
Liberal Democratic Party of Russia	5.71	3
Communist Party of the Russian Federation	5.15	3
A Just Russia	2.79	1
Registered voters/turnout		

== See also ==
- List of Chairmen of the Supreme Council of Crimea
- Verkhovna Rada, the parliament of Ukraine
- Mejlis of the Crimean Tatar People, a representative body of the Crimean Tatars
