= Myroslav Horbatiuk =

Ukrainian politician and engineer

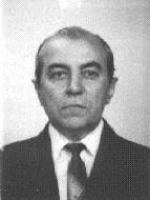

Member of the Verkhovna Rada
- In office 1994–1998

Personal details
- Born: June 15, 1940 (age 86) Rudka, Rivne Oblast, Ukraine
- Children: 2
- Education: Lviv Polytechnic
- Occupation: Politician

Myroslav Pylypovych Horbatiuk (Ukrainian: Мирослав Пилипович Горбатюк; born 15 June 1940) is a Ukrainian politician, a member of Verkhovna Rada of Ukraine of the 2nd convocation, chairman of the National Committee for Democratization and Reform of Science in Ukraine.

== Biography ==
Myroslav Horbatiuk was born on June 15, 1940, in Rudka, Rivne Oblast.

In 1957–1962, he studied at the Faculty of Power Engineering at Lviv Polytechnic Institute with specialization in electrical engineering.

In 1962–1965, he worked at the All-Ukrainian Institute of Transformer Building in Zaporizhia, and in 1966–1968, he worked at Lviv Polytechnic Institute.

Since 1971, he has been a graduate student and a leading engineer at the Institute of Electrodynamics of the National Academy of Sciences of Ukraine.

In 1989, he organized the branch of the People's Movement of Ukraine in the institute. From 1990 to 1994, he was the co-chairman of the Soviet District of People's Movement of Ukraine in Kyiv, and from 1994 to 1996, he was the chairman of the Kyiv Regional People's Movement of Ukraine.

In 1993, he co-organized the All-Ukrainian Conference Democratization and Reform of Science in Ukraine.

He served as a Member of Parliament of Ukraine during the 2nd convocation from April 1994 (2nd round) to April 1998, representing the Soviet Electoral District of Kyiv N 016, nominated by People's Movement of Ukraine. He was a member of the Commission on Science and Public Education and a member of People's Movement of Ukraine faction.

He also was a candidate from the Ukrainian National Bloc of Kostenko and Plyushch in the 2006 Ukrainian parliamentary election.

He is the author of 15 scientific papers on the theory of electrical engineering.

== Awards ==
Order for Merit 3rd Class (November 18, 2009) – "for a significant personal contribution to the defense of the national idea, the establishment and development of the Ukrainian independent state, and active political and public activities".

== Personal life ==
His wife Oksana Vasylivna Horbatiuk is an art historian, senior researcher at the Institute of Art Studies of the National Academy of Sciences of Ukraine. They have two daughters, Khristina (1984) and Bohdana (1985).
