= Roman Ivanychuk =

Ukrainian writer and politician

Hero of Ukraine Merited Culture Worker Roman Ivanychuk
- Роман Iваничук
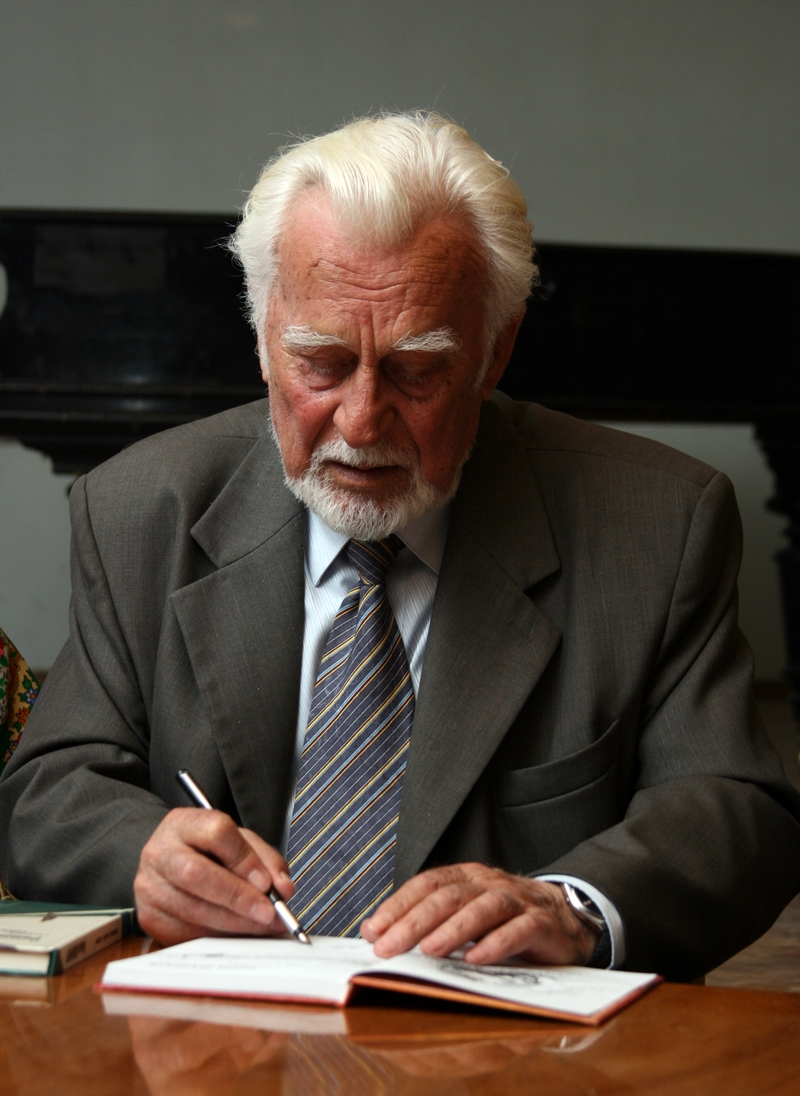
- Ivanychuk in 2008

People's Deputy of Ukraine
- In office 15 May 1990 – 22 April 1994
- Preceded by: Position established
- Succeeded by: Les Tanyuk
- Constituency: Lviv Oblast, Drohobych

Personal details
- Born: 27 May 1929 Tracz, Poland (now Trach, Ukraine)
- Died: 17 September 2016 (aged 87) Lviv, Ukraine
- Resting place: Lychakiv Cemetery, Lviv
- Party: People's Movement of Ukraine
- Other political affiliations: Democratic Bloc
- Education: University of Lviv
- Writing career
- Period: 1958–2012
- Genre: Historical fiction
- Notable awards: Shevchenko National Prize, Hero of Ukraine

Roman Ivanovych Ivanychuk (Ukrainian: Роман Іванович Iваничук; 27 May 1929 — 17 September 2016) was a Soviet and Ukrainian writer and politician. He was awarded the Shevchenko National Prize in 1985 and the title of Hero of Ukraine in 2009. He also served as a People's Deputy of Ukraine from Drohobych from 1990 to 1994, during which time he was a member of the anti-communist Democratic Bloc and the People's Movement of Ukraine.

== Early life and literary career ==
Roman Ivanovych Ivanychuk was born in the village of Tracz, which was then part of the Second Polish Republic. It is now in Ukraine's western Ivano-Frankivsk Oblast. His family was opposed to the occupation of Galicia by Nazi Germany, and his brother joined the Ukrainian Insurgent Army. Ivanychuk later said that he would have done the same if he had been old enough to fight.

Ivanychuk began studying the Ukrainian language at the University of Lviv in 1948. Upon entering the university, he was denounced by staff for refusing to join the Komsomol and wearing a vyshyvanka. He was eventually expelled from the university and conscripted into the Soviet Army, serving from 1950 to 1953. He graduated from the University of Lviv in 1957, and worked as a school teacher between 1957 and 1963. Like many other Ukrainian linguists at the time, he taught at rural schools throughout Ukraine. Ivanychuk began publishing short stories and novels in 1958. After 1963, he worked as an editor of the Zhovten magazine until 1990.

== Political career ==
During the 1989–1991 Ukrainian revolution Ivanychuk supported the People's Movement of Ukraine, the leading opposition group against the Soviet government. He was one of the co-founders of the Taras Shevchenko Society for the Ukrainian Language.

Ivanychuk was elected to the Supreme Soviet of the Ukrainian Soviet Socialist Republic during the 1990 Ukrainian Supreme Soviet election from the city of Drohobych. He joined the Democratic Bloc, and he was additionally head of the subcommittee on Art, Creativity and the Revival of the Ukrainian Language within the Verkhovna Rada Cultural and Spiritual Committee.

== Later life and death ==
In 1995, Ivanychuk became a professor at the University of Lviv, teaching there until his death. He died in Lviv on 17 September 2016. He was buried in Lychakiv Cemetery on 19 September.

== Bibliography ==
Ivanychuk wrote around 15 historical novels, and a number of short-story collections. Some of his books were translated into French and Russian.

- Prut nese kryhu (Прут несе кригу, Prut Carries Ice), short-story collection (1958);
- Ne rubayte yaseniv (Не рубайте ясенів, Do not Cut Ash Trees), short-story collection (1961);
- Pid sklepinniamy khramu (Під склепінням храму, Under the Vault of the Temple), short-story collection (1962);
- Krai bytoho shliakhu (Край битого шляху, The Edge of the Beaten Track), novel (1961);
- Topolyna zametil (Тополина заметіль, Poplar Blizzard), short-story collection (1965);
- Malvy (Мальви, Malvas), novel (1968); also published as Яничари;
- Dim na hori (Дім на горі, The House on the Mountain), short-story collection (1969);
- Syvi nochi (Сиві ночі, Grey Nights), short-story collection (1975);
- Misto (Місто, City), novel (1977);
- Cherlene vyno (Черлене вино, Dark Red Wine), novel (1977);
- Manuskrypt z vulyci Ruskoi (Манускрипт з вулиці Руської, Manuscript from the Ruska street), novel (1979);
- Na perevali (На перевалі, On the Mountain Pass), short-story collection (1980);
- Voda z kameniu (Вода з каменю, Water from Stone), novel (1982);
- Chetvertyi vymir (Четвертий вимір, Forth Dimension), novel (1984);
- Siome nebo (Сьоме небо, Seventh Sky), novel (1985);
- Shramy na skali (Шрами на скалі, Scars on the Cliff), novel (1987);
- Zhuravlunyi kryk (Журавлиний крик, Crane's Cry), novel (1988);
- Bo viina viinoiu (Бо війна війною, Because the War is being the War), novel (1989);
- Orda (Орда, Horde), novel (1992);
- Vohnenni stovpy (Вогненні стовпи, Fire Pillars), novel (2006);
- Khresna proshcha (Хресна проща, The Procession of the Cross), novel (2011);
- Torhovytsa (Торговиця, Marketplace), novel (2012)
