= Oleksandr Klymenko (2014 Ukrainian presidential candidate) =

Ukrainian politician (born 1965)

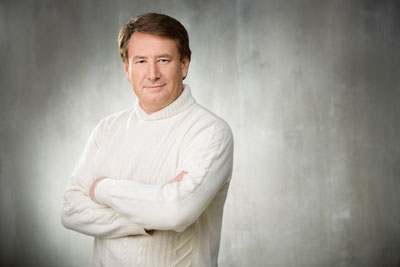
April 2014

Oleksandr Ivanovych Klymenko (Ukrainian: Олександр Іванович Клименко; born April 14, 1965, in Marinka, Donetsk Oblast) is a Ukrainian politician, entrepreneur. From late 2013 until 2021, he was a leader of the Ukrainian People's Party.

== Biography ==
Until 1998, there is little or no information on Klymenko, except that he was born in a small city just outside Donetsk. Sometimes before 1998 Klymenko also was a director of the "Enerhozbutprom". In 1999, he graduated the Donetsk Institute of Economics and Business Law.

In 1998–2005, Klymenko was a chairman of shareholders council of the "Donbasenerhobud" and the president of "Leasing-Center" in Donetsk.

In 2002, parliamentary elections as a nonpartisan Klymenko ran for the Supreme Council of Ukraine in district 107 of the Luhansk Oblast finishing with 14.6% in the third place out of 12 contenders. In 2004 he joined the Ukrainian People's Party. In April 2005 to July 2006 Klymenko was a deputy governor of the Donetsk Oblast. In 2006 Donetsk city mayoral elections he gained 6%. In 2006 parliamentary elections as a member of Ukrainian National Bloc of Kostenko and Plyushch Klymenko unsuccessfully ran for parliament again being placed #7 on the party's list. In 2007 parliamentary elections he finally became the People's Deputy of Ukraine on the party list of the Our Ukraine–People's Self-Defense Bloc as #50. In 2012 Klymenko headed the electoral campaign of Our Ukraine in Donetsk Oblast.

On October 5, 2013, Klymenko was elected the leader of Ukrainian People's Party at the 14th party's congress.

On March 29, 2014, he submitted documents to the Central Election Commission of Ukraine as a candidate for the 2014 Ukrainian presidential election as a leader of the Ukrainian People's Party. But he withdrew his candidacy on May 18 "to support Petro Poroshenko as the sole representative of the national democratic forces".

Political offices
Preceded by Yuriy Kostenko	Leader of Ukrainian People's Party; 2013–present	Succeeded by
