= Ukrainian People's Party =

Ukrainian People's Party Українська Народна Партія
- Leader: Yuri Kostenko
- Deputy Leaders: Olha Davyd; Oleksii Miroshnychenko
- Founded: 31 December 1999
- Split from: People's Movement of Ukraine
- Headquarters: Mechnykova 3, Kyiv
- Youth wing: Ukrainian People's Youth
- Ideology: Christian democracy Ukrainian nationalism Pro-Europeanism
- Political position: Centre-right
- Colours: Blue; Yellow
- Verkhovna Rada: 0 / 450
- Regions: 19 / 43,122

Website
- www.unp.ua

The Ukrainian People's Party (Ukrainian: Українська Народна Партія; Ukrains'ka Narodna Partiya) is a centre-right political party in Ukraine, registered on Old Year's Day in 1999, and known until 2003 as the Ukrainian People's Movement (Ukrainian: Український Народний Рух; Ukrajins'kyi Narodnyj Rukh).

== History ==
The party was founded as a merger of separate local branches of the People's Movement of Ukraine.

In the legislative elections in Ukraine, 30 March 2002, the Ukrainian National Movement was part of the Viktor Yushchenko Bloc Our Ukraine.

In January 2003 it changed the name to Ukrainian People's Party to avoid being confused with People's Movement of Ukraine, out of which it was originally split. Later that year, UNP on its first party congress under the new name, endorsed Viktor Yushchenko for the 2004 Ukrainian presidential election.

In the legislative elections in Ukraine, 26 March 2006, the party was part of the Ukrainian National Bloc of Kostenko and Plyushch, which has not crossed the 3% threshold in that election, and would later be dissolved.

In the parliamentary elections on 30 September 2007, the party was part of the Our Ukraine alliance, that won 72 out of 450 seats.

In the 2010 local elections the party won a few representative in regional parliaments.

The party announced it will be merged into Our Ukraine in December 2011. This process started mid-December 2011. It was the plan that the parties would be unificated in February 2012. But by February 2013 Ukrainian People's Party was still an independent party.

The party competed on one single party under "umbrella" party Our Ukraine in the 2012 Ukrainian parliamentary election, together with Congress of Ukrainian Nationalists; this list won 1.11% of the national votes and no constituencies and thus failed to win parliamentary representation. The party itself had competed in 34 constituencies and lost in all.

The party congress approved a merge with People's Movement of Ukraine in May 2013. However, a section of the party did not merge and continued the parties activities under the leadership of Oleksandr Ivanovych Klymenko.

In the 2014 Ukrainian parliamentary election the participated in 8 constituencies; but its candidates lost in all of them and thus the party won no parliamentary seats.

In the 2020 Ukrainian local elections, the party saw a total of 30 members elected to any level of political office across Ukraine.

In June 2021, Yuri Kostenko was reelected as party leader.

== Leadership ==
Date	Party leader
1999–2013	Yuri Kostenko
2013–2021	Oleksandr Klymenko
2021–present	Yuri Kostenko

== Results ==
=== Verkhovna Rada ===
Year	Votes	%	Position	Seats won	+/-	Government
2002	With Our Ukraine Bloc		1st	11 / 450 (Note: UNR seats within the Our Ukraine Bloc total.)		Opposition (2002–2005)
2002	With Our Ukraine Bloc		1st	11 / 450		Coalition government (2005)
2002	With Our Ukraine Bloc		1st	11 / 450		Coalition government (2005–2006)
2006	With Ukrainian National Bloc of Kostenko and Plyushch		▼8th	0 / 450	▼11	Extra-parliamentary
2007	With Our Ukraine–People's Self-Defense Bloc		▲3rd	5 / 450 (Note: UNP seats within the Our Ukraine Bloc total.)	▲5	Coalition government (2007–2010)
2007	With Our Ukraine–People's Self-Defense Bloc		▲3rd	5 / 450	▲5	Opposition (2010–2012)
2012	Did not participate in the election (Note: However, UNP did nominate 34 candidates in single-mandate constituencies.)			0 / 450	▼5	Extra-parliamentary
2014	Did not participate in the election (Note: However, UNP did nominate 8 candidates in single-mandate constituencies.)			0 / 450	0	Extra-parliamentary
2019	Did not participate in the election			0 / 450	0	Extra-parliamentary

== Gallery ==
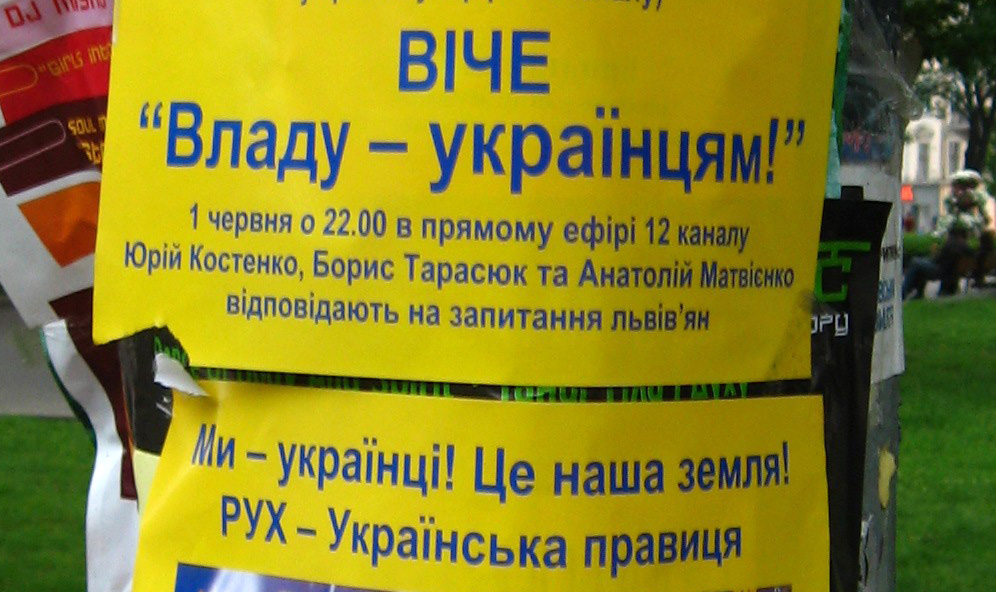
Poster of the party reads: "Power to Ukrainians! We are Ukrainians! This is our land!" Lviv, 2007

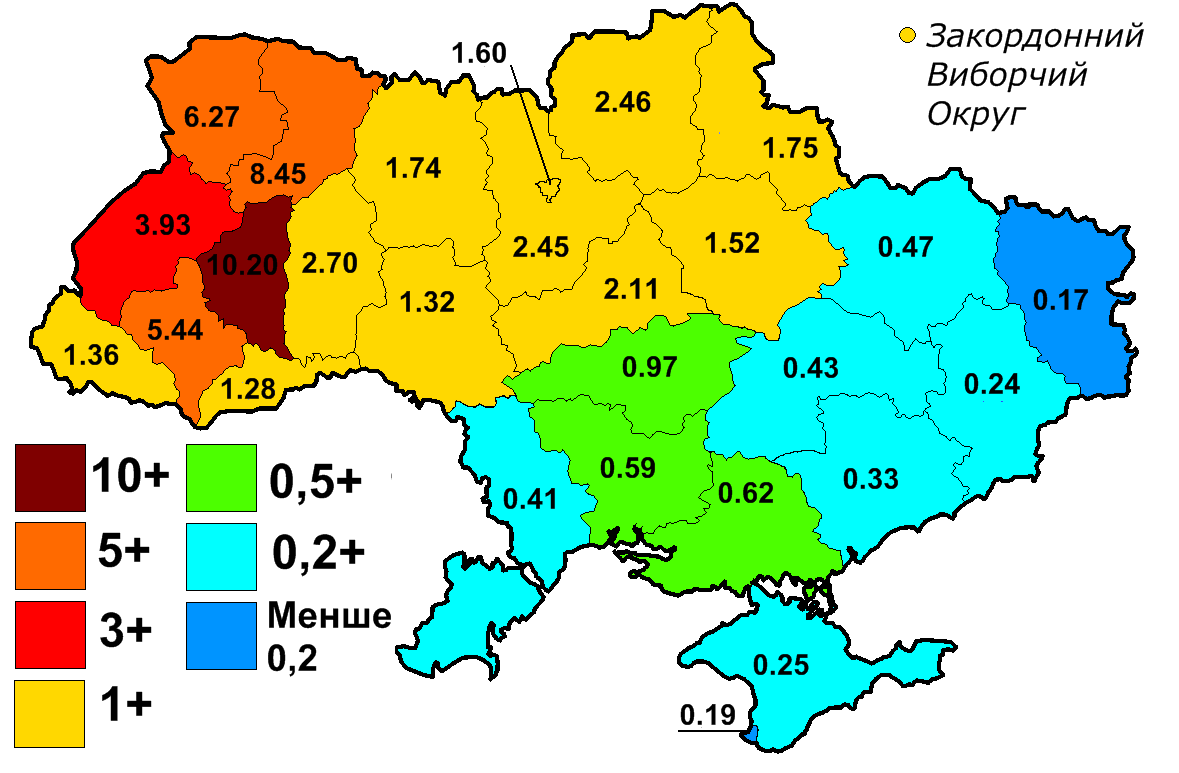
Results of the 2006 elections

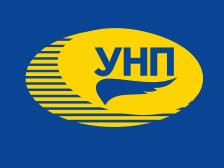
Former logo of the party (2012–2021)
