= 1990 Ukrainian local elections =

1990 Ukrainian SSR local elections
- March 4, 1990

The 1990 Ukrainian local elections took place on 4 March 1990 when Ukraine, as the Ukrainian SSR, was still a part of the Soviet Union. In these relatively free elections, electoral commissions managed to block the participation of most opposition group candidates, while "acceptable social organisations" were permitted to register.

The Ukrainian nationalist opposition People's Movement of Ukraine (Rukh) won majorities in the elections of the city councils of Lviv and Kiev (Kyiv) and was successful in western Ukraine. The "Democratic Bloc" (a coalition of Rukh, Ukrainian Republican Party and Democratic Party of Ukraine, Green World Association and other organisations) won the elections in Lviv Oblast, Ivano-Frankivsk Oblast and Ternopil Oblast.

The Communist Party won the local government elections in Crimean Oblast.

Only after the March 1990 Ukrainian Supreme Soviet election and local elections did political parties start to get established.

== See also ==
- 1990 Ukrainian Supreme Soviet election
- 1990 Soviet Union regional elections
