= New Ukraine =

New Ukraine may refer

- People's Democratic Union "New Ukraine", a political union of Ukraine established in 1992
- People's Party New Ukraine, former name of Peasant Bloc Agricultural Ukraine
- Green Ukraine, a historical name for an area in the Russian Far East
