= Ukrainian Green movement =

Ukrainian movement

The Ukrainian green movement, founded in 1988 by Yuriy Shcherbak, was a name for loose group of various governmental and non-governmental organisations defending the environment in Ukraine.

== Members ==
Members include:

- Green party of Ukraine
- Panukrainian Ecological League
- National Ecological Center
- Regional Ecological Center - Kiev
- NGO "MAMA-86"
