= Yuriy Shcherbak =

Ukrainian writer, epidemiologist, politician, diplomat, and environmental activist

- Юрій Щербак
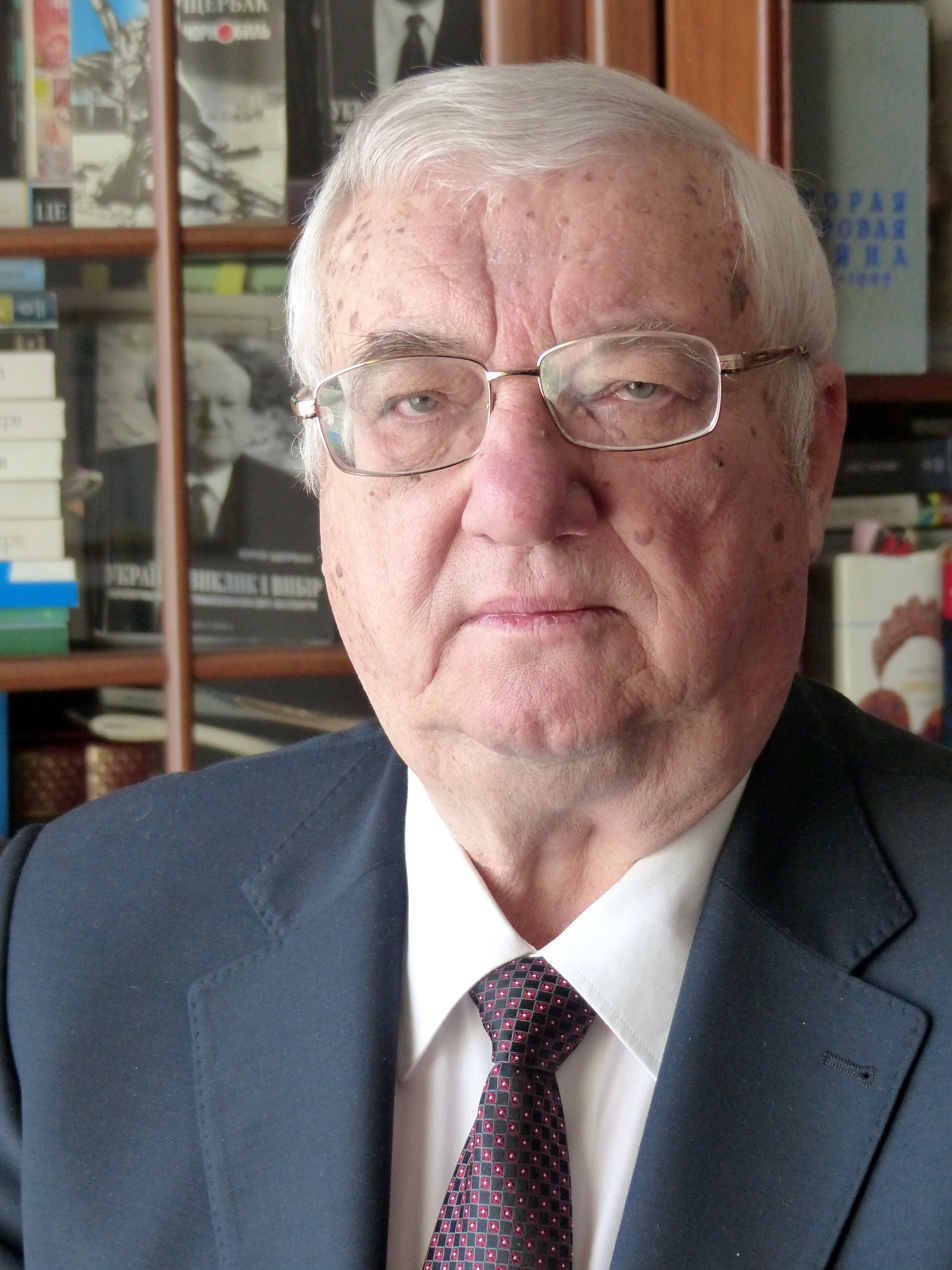
- Scherbak in 2014

1st Minister of Natural Environment Protection
- In office June 1991 – October 1992
- President: Leonid Kravchuk
- Prime Minister: Vitold Fokin
- Preceded by: Position established
- Succeeded by: Yuriy Kostenko

Ambassador of Ukraine to Israel
- In office 29 October 1992 – 22 October 1994
- President: Leonid Kravchuk
- Preceded by: Position established
- Succeeded by: Oleksandr Maidannyk

Ambassador of Ukraine to the United States
- In office 1994–1998
- President: Leonid Kuchma
- Preceded by: Oleh Bilorus
- Succeeded by: Anton Buteyko

Ambassador of Ukraine to Canada
- In office 9 March 2000 – 7 April 2003
- President: Leonid Kuchma
- Preceded by: Volodymyr Khandohiy
- Succeeded by: Mykola Maimeskul

Personal details
- Born: 12 October 1934 (age 92) Kyiv, Ukrainian SSR, Soviet Union (now Ukraine)
- Party: Party of Greens of Ukraine
- Education: Kyiv Medical Institute
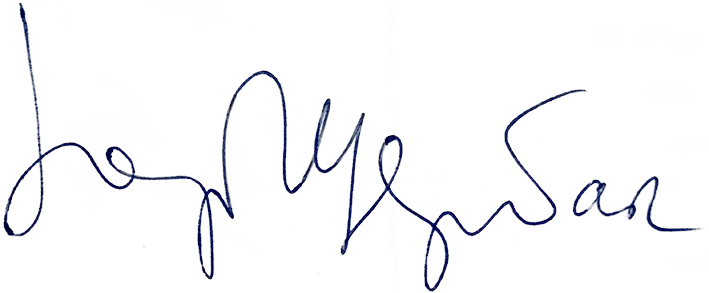
- Signature

Yuriy Mykolayovych Shcherbak (Ukrainian: Ю́рій Микола́йович Щерба́к; born 23 October 1934) is a Ukrainian writer, screenwriter, publicist, epidemiologist, politician, diplomat, environmental activist and political analyst. Doctor of Medicine (1983), Laureate of Y. Yanovsky Literary Prize (1984), O. Dovzhenko State Prize (1984) and Shevchenko National Prize (2026).

== Early life and family ==
He was born in Kyiv in 1934, about the time when his father was arrested by NKVD. During World War II the family was evacuated to Russia. He returned to his native city in the beginning of March 1944. His older brother, Mykola Shcherbak (1927–1998), famous scientist-zoologist, was head of the Zoological Museum of the Academy of Sciences of Ukraine, and in his student's years was accused (1948) and condemned by KGB (1948–1954) for nationalism.

== Epidemiological career ==
Yuriy Shcherbak graduated from Kyiv Medical Institute in 1958. From 1958 to 1987 he worked in the Kyiv L. Gromashevsky Research Institute of Epidemiology and Infectious Diseases as a junior and later senior researcher. His PhD (1965) and MD (1983) theses devoted to the epidemiology of especially dangerous infectious diseases. He took part in the fight against epidemics of cholera and other diseases in Ukraine and Uzbekistan, for which he was awarded the Order of Red Banner of Labour (1971). Shcherbak is the author of about 100 scientific papers and more than 20 books.

== Literary career ==
His career in literature began in the mid-1950s at the literary association of his medical school. His first stories were published in the magazine "Yunost" and illustrated by his own illustrations. The first story "Like at the war" (1966) tells of doctor's everyday life. He has been a Member of the Writer's Union of Ukraine since 1966 (Secretary of the Board in 1987–1991), and a Member of the Union of Cinematographers of Ukraine since 1971. His debut as a playwright was with the play "Discovery" at the Kharkiv Pushkin Academic Theatre in 1975. He has an excellent command of Polish, and translated Polish poetry and writers, often lecturing to students at Warsaw University.

In the novel "The Chronicle of Yaropol Town" (1968) he described the grotesque, fantastic story of the small town of Yaropol, chronicling and describing all manner of real and incredible events which happened there over several centuries. The story combines elements of science fiction, legends and fairy tales. He has also written several fantastic stories: "Interrogation", "Synthesis", "Odyssey −2482" and many others.

Most of his works can be attributed to the conventional genre of "urban prose". He is the author of the novel "The Barrier of Incompatibility" which concerns the moral problems of heart transplantation, the documentary novel "The Causes and Consequences" regarding the struggle against rabies, novels, digests of short stories, poems and plays, screenplays and a number of artistic, scientific and documentary movies. He was awarded the Y. Yanovsky literary prize (1984) for a collection of short stories "The Bright Dances of the Past", and the O. Dovzhenko state prize for the screenplay of the film "Public Attitudes". Soviet period books were published in Germany, Poland, Hungary, Czechoslovakia, Romania and other countries. As a publicist Yuriy Shcherbak became known with documentary novel about the Chernobyl tragedy. "Chornobyl" (1987–1991) was published in the US, Canada, Germany, Poland, Switzerland, Japan and other countries.

In the dystopian thriller *Dead Memory: Voices and Screams*, published in 2021, he painted a grim picture of the occupation of Ukraine, in which the enemy has achieved its goal: the destruction of national memory. Under the guise of the main anti-hero, the Jewish ruler of Ukraine, Borys Barkas—who dreams of creating a transnational human being of the future, hates nationalists for the Holocaust and Jewish pogroms, uses cocaine and dreams of selling Ukraine to Russia—Shcherbak created a caricature of Volodymyr Zelenskyy. The author also subjected digitalisation and gender equality to harsh criticism. This novel was awarded the Shevchenko National Prize.

== Career in independent Ukraine ==
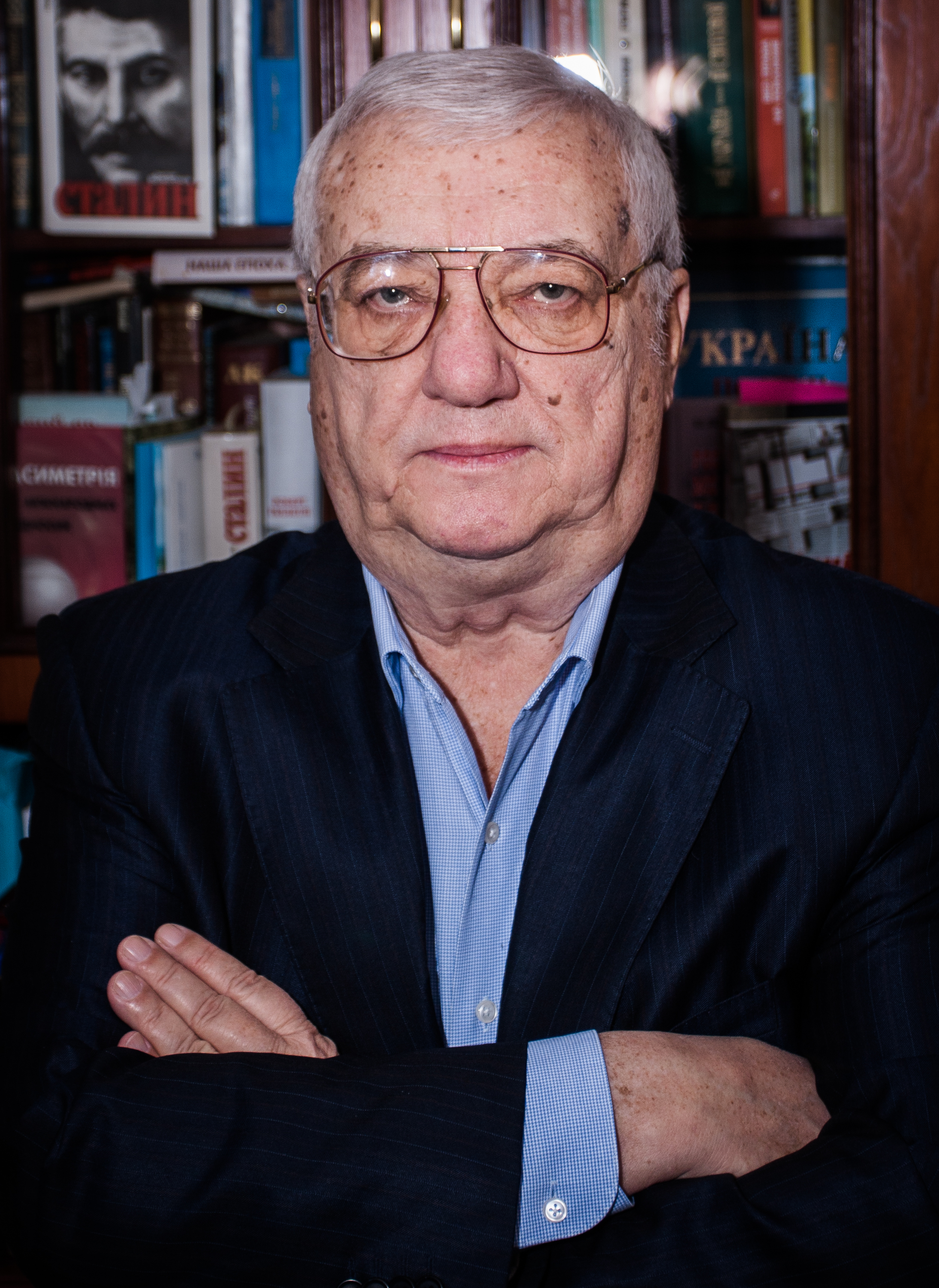
Shcherbak in 2014

During the collapse of the Soviet Union and Ukraine's independence (1989–1991), he moved away from the literary work and engaged in politics. Never having been affiliated with the Communist Party of the Soviet Union, Yuriy Shcherbak is one of the founders and Chairman of the Ukrainian Environmental Association "Green World", and the first leader of the Green Party of Ukraine. During the period 1992–1998 he was engaged with diplomatic work. In 1998, the Institute of Ukrainian Studies at Harvard University published his book "The Strategic Role of Ukraine", and subsequently in 2003 his other political book "Ukraine: Challenges and Choices (Perspectives of Ukraine in a Globalized World of the XXI Century)" was published. He is internationally recognized as one of Ukraine's foremost specialists on geo-political strategic issues, and is the author of numerous studies, articles and books on Chornobyl, ecology, public health, NATO and Ukraine's relations with Russia, the European Union and the United States. Throughout the years he has been internationally sought as a political analyst and commentator by all media outlets, conferences and seminars, and is a respected diplomat in the international arena. Yuriy Shcherbak was elected a member of the World Academy of Art and Science (WAAS) in 2013. He is married and has daughter and son, speaks Polish and English.

== Public career ==
- 1988 - Founder and leader of Ukrainian Green movement
- 1989–1991 – Deputy of the USSR, Chairman of the sub-Committee on Nuclear Energy and Environment, member of oppositional Interregional Deputy Group headed by Academician Andrei Sakharov
- 1990–1992 – Chairman of the Green Party of Ukraine (formerly Ukrainian Green movement)
- 1991–1992 – First environment Minister of independent Ukraine, Member of the National Security Council of Ukraine
- 1992–1994 – Extraordinary and Plenipotentiary Ambassador of Ukraine to Israel
- 1994–1998 – Extraordinary and Plenipotentiary Ambassador of Ukraine to the USA (since 1997 also to Mexico)
- 1998–2000 – Advisor to the President of Ukraine
- 2000–2003 – Extraordinary and Plenipotentiary Ambassador of Ukraine to Canada (also Representative of Ukraine at the International Civil Aviation Organization (ICAO, Montreal).
- Since 12/2009 – Co-founder and Member of the Council on Foreign and Security Policy
- 2004–2006 – Advisor to the Chairman of the Verkhovna Rada of Ukraine
- Since 2006 – President of the V. Vernadsky Institute for Sustainable Development.

== Awards and honours ==
- Order of Red Banner of Labour (1971)
- Order for Cultural Merit of Poland (1977)
- Laureate of Y. Yanovsky Literary Prize (1984)
- Laureate of O. Dovzhenko State Prize (1984)
- Order "For merits", III grade (1996)
- Mexican Order of the Aztec Eagle (1998)
- Diploma of the Supreme Council of Ukraine (2004)
- Order "For merits", II grade (2009)
- Order of Christ the Saviour, Orthodox Church Kyiv Patriarchate (2011).
- Antonovych prize (2018)
- Shevchenko National Prize (2026)

== Books and publications ==
- "Like at the war", stories and novels (1966)
- "The Chronicle of Yaropol town" (1968)
- "Barrier of incompatibility", novel (1971)
- "Little football team", stories and novels (1973)
- "Signs", short stories and novels (1984)
- "Causes and Consequences", novel (1986)
- "Chernobyl", documentary novel (1987)
- "To hope", collection of plays (1989)
- "Doctors", novel and stories (1990)
- "Strategic Role of Ukraine", political and journalistic essays (1998)
- "Ukraine: Challenge and choice" (2003)
- "Ukraine in the area of turbulence" (2010)
  - EN as "Realm of Darkness" (2016; Translated by Stephen Komarnyckyj.)
- "The big game: Phantoms 2079", continuation of "Time of smertohrystiv" (2012).
- Dead Memory. Voices and Cries - awarded Shevchenko National Prize in 2026.

== Cinematic works (movie scripts and films) ==
- "We are students from different continents" (1965)
- "They defended spring" (1965)
- "Morning Island" (1966)
- "Sons of Bashtanka Republic" (1967)
- "Years and seconds" (1967)
- "Quarantine" (1968)
- "Khortytsia" (1969)
- "The way to the heart" (1970)
- "V.M. Glushkov, cybernetist" (1980, co-author)
- "Island singing sands" (1981, TV film)
- "Discovery" (1982, TV film)
- "Public attitudes" (1983)
- "Approaching the Future" (1986, co-author)

A TV film "Once in December" (1988) was based on Shcherbak's story "Harmonic inspiration".

Political offices
Preceded by	Leader of Party of Greens of Ukraine; 1990–1992	Succeeded by Vitaliy Kononov
