= Ukrainian National Bloc of Kostenko and Plyushch =

Ukrainian People's Bloc of Kostenko and Plyushch Український Народний Блок Костенка і Плюща
- Leader: Yuriy Kostenko; Ivan Plyushch
- Founded: 9 December 2005
- Dissolved: 11 August 2008
- Headquarters: Kyiv
- Ideology: Agrarianism; Ukrainian nationalism Christian democracy Pro-Europeanism
- Political position: Centre-right
- Colors: Blue; Yellow; Maroon
- Slogan: We have won our freedom – we will win our destiny! (Здобули волю – здобудемо долю!

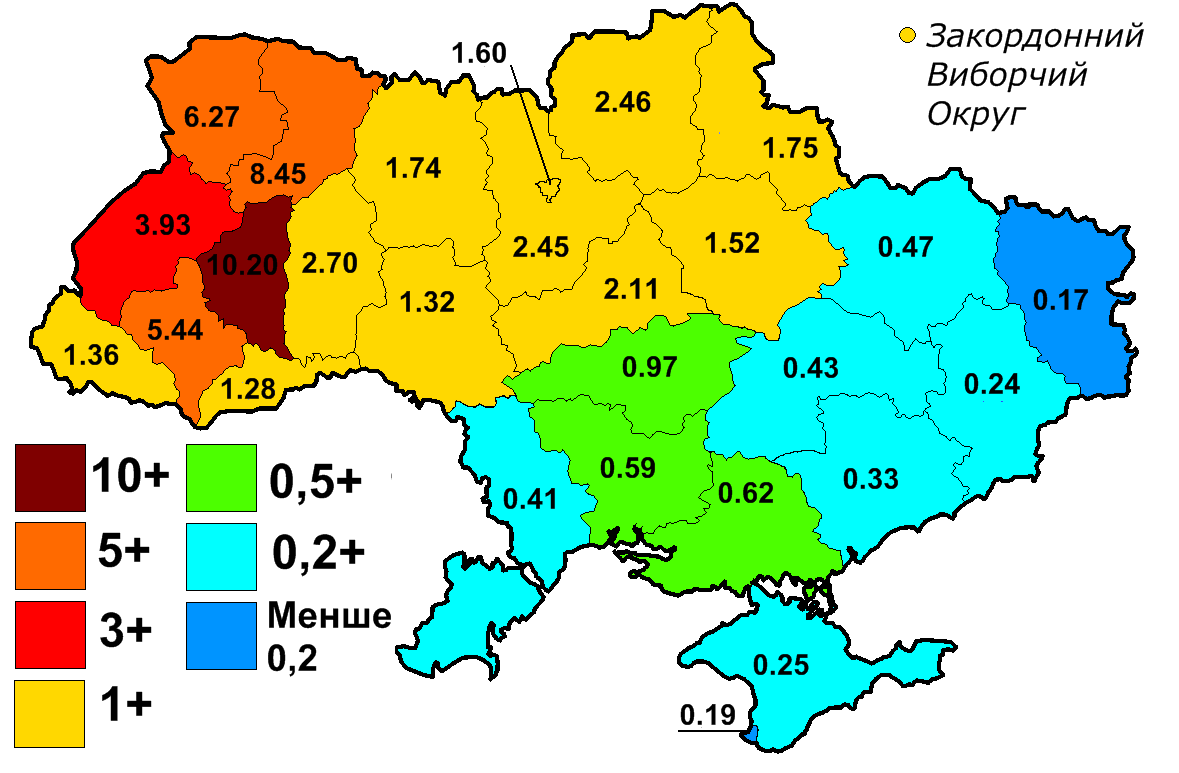
Results of the 2006 parliamentary elections

The Ukrainian People's Bloc of Kostenko and Plyushch, (Ukrainian: Український Народний Блок Костенка і Плюща, romanized: Ukraiinskyi Narodnyi Blok Kostenka i Pliushcha) is a defunct centre-right political alliance in Ukraine led by Yuriy Kostenko and Ivan Plyushch.

== Membership ==
Party	Abbr.	Leader	List candidates
Ukrainian People's Party; Українська Народна Партія	UNP; УНП	Yuriy Kostenko	184 / 219
Party of Free Peasants and Entrepreneurs of Ukraine; Партія вільних селян та підприємців України	PVSPU; ПВСПУ	Ivan Plyushch	16 / 219
Ukraine United; Україна Соборна	US; УС	Tetiana Yakheieva	15 / 219
Independents; Безпартійні			4 / 219

=== Former members ===
Party	Abbr.	Leader
Republican Christian Party; Республiканська Християнська партія	RCP; РХП	Mykola Pokrovskyi

== Results ==
At the 2006 Ukrainian parliamentary election, 26 March 2006, it won 1,87% of the popular vote and no seats in the Ukrainian Parliament, although it did win seats in some Ukrainian provinces regional council elections.

== Aftermath ==
After the 2006 elections all parties have gone separate ways, with Ukrainian People's Party later joining Our Ukraine–People's Self-Defense Bloc for the 2007 election.

Party of Free Peasants and Entrepreneurs of Ukraine renamed itself into Rural Revival Party, and founded Peasants' Bloc "Agrarian Ukraine" to run in the 2007 election, while the party's nominal leader within the bloc, Ivan Plyushch, joined and ran in the Our Ukraine–People's Self-Defense Bloc list.

Ukraine United would also found a separate bloc to run in 2007 election, which it has led, called Ukrainian People's Bloc, almost identically to the former.
