= Yuriy Kostenko =

Ukrainian politician

- Юрій Костенко
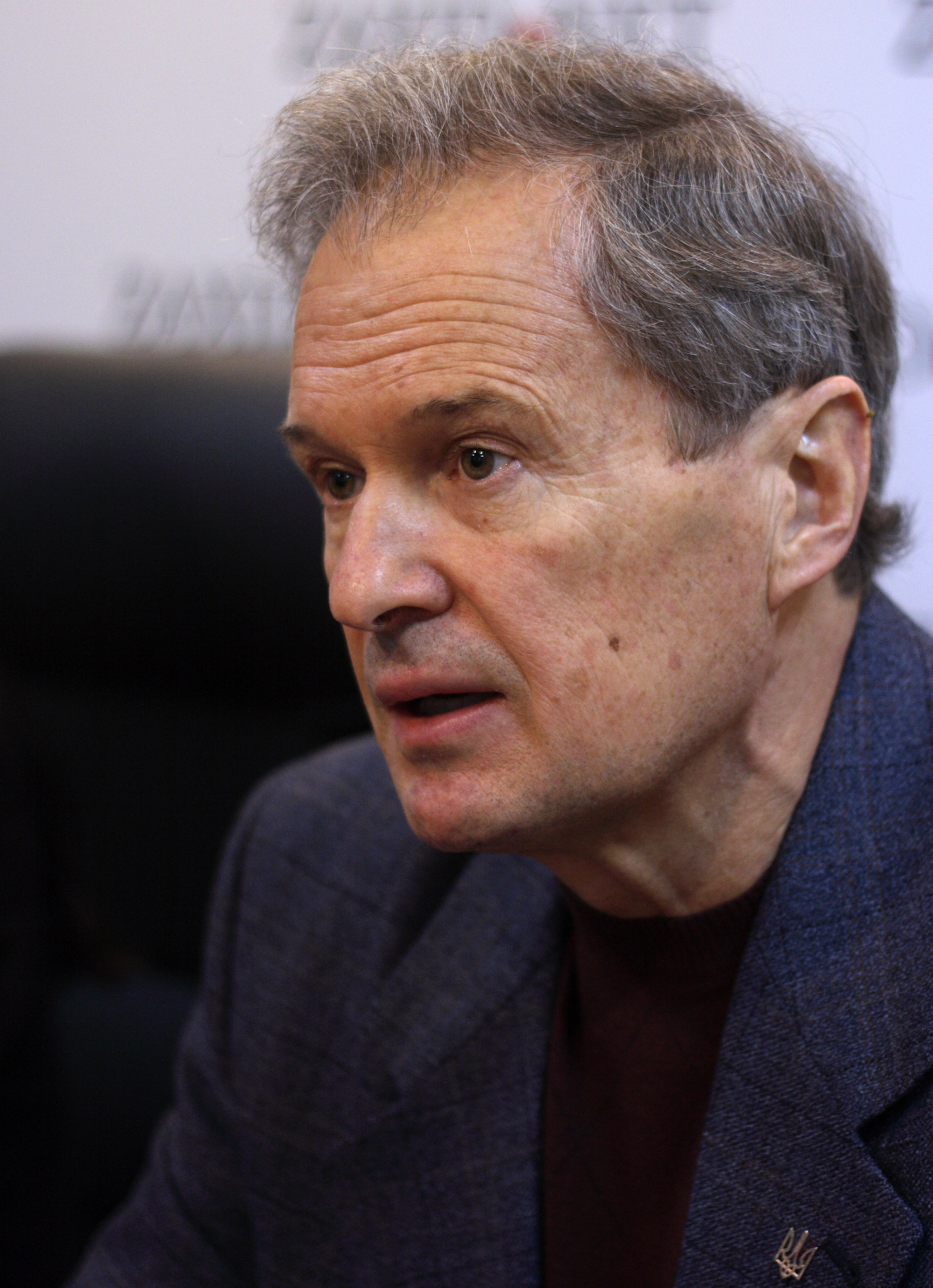
- Kostenko in 2009

Minister of Natural Environment Protection
- In office 13 October 1992 – May 1998
- President: Leonid Kravchuk; Leonid Kuchma
- Prime Minister: Leonid Kuchma; Vitaliy Masol; Yevhen Marchuk; Pavlo Lazarenko; Valeriy Pustovoitenko
- Preceded by: Yuriy Shcherbak
- Succeeded by: Vasyl Shevchuk

People's Deputy of Ukraine
- In office 23 November 2007 – 12 December 2012
- Constituency: NUNS, No. 16
- In office 15 May 1990 – 25 May 2006
- Preceded by: Position established
- Constituency: Kyiv, No. 22 (1990–1994); Kyiv, No. 23 (1994–1998); People's Movement of Ukraine, No. 5 (1998–2002); Our Ukraine Bloc, No. 4 (2002–2006)

Personal details
- Born: 12 June 1951 (age 75) Nova Obodivka, Ukrainian SSR, Soviet Union (now Ukraine)
- Party: People's Movement of Ukraine (1989–1999)
- Education: Zaporizhzhia Polytechnic National University

Yuriy Ivanovych Kostenko (Ukrainian: Юрій Іванович Костенко; born 6 December 1951) is a Ukrainian politician and leader of the Ukrainian People's Party.

== Biography ==
Kostenko holds a Ph.D. from the Zaporizhzhia Polytechnic National University. In 1989, he became one of the founders of People's Movement of Ukraine (Rukh) and served as a People's Deputy of Ukraine from 1990 to 2006 and from 2007 to 2012, and in 2002 as a member of Our Ukraine. From 1992 to 1998, he served as the minister of environmental protection. Kostenko was a candidate at the 1999 Ukrainian presidential election where he received 2.17% of votes. Kostenko was involved in Ukraine’s nuclear disarmament, which he later regretted, and in dealing with the aftermath of the Chernobyl disaster.

Before the 2006 Ukrainian parliamentary election Kostenko initiated the creation of a coalition known as Ukrainian National Bloc of Kostenko and Plyushch who has acquired 1.9% of the vote and did not exceed the 3% threshold of the election.

In July 2007 Kostenko and Ivan Plyushch joined together the bloc Our Ukraine–People's Self-Defense Bloc and both got re-elected as People's Deputy of Ukraine. Unlike many allies of Yushchenko, Kostenko did not defect from the Our Ukraine grouping in parliament.

Kostenko was a candidate in the 2010 Ukrainian presidential election, his party program included recognizing Ukrainian Insurgent Army veterans, during the election, he received 0.22% of the votes.

Kostenko's Ukrainian People's Party competed on one single party under "umbrella" party Our Ukraine in the 2012 Ukrainian parliamentary election, together with Congress of Ukrainian Nationalists; this list won 1.11% of the national votes and no constituencies, and thus failed to win parliamentary representation. Kostenko was second the election list of Our Ukraine. He did not participate in the 2014 Ukrainian parliamentary election.

Political offices
Preceded by	Leader of Ukrainian People's Party; 1999–2013	Succeeded by Oleksandr Klymenko
