= Rural Revival Party =

Former political party in Ukraine

The Rural Revival Party (Ukrainian: Партія відродження села, romanized: Partiia vidrodzhennia sela) is a former political party in Ukraine; the party merged into the (then) new party United Left and Peasants in December 2011.

== History ==
The party was registered in May 1993 under the name Party of free peasants (Ukrainian: Партія вільних селян). In March 1994, it changed to Party of free peasants and entrepreneurs of Ukraine After an unsuccessful political campaign in the 1994 parliamentary election, it did not participate in the 1998 and 2002 elections.

In the parliamentary elections of 26 March 2006, the party was part of the Ukrainian National Bloc of Kostenko and Plyushch which failed to win parliamentary seats. After this election, the party changed its name to Rural Revival Party.

In the 30 September 2007 elections, the party failed as part of the Peasants' Bloc "Agrarian Ukraine" to win parliamentary representation.

In 2011, the party dissolved. Its former members joined the United Left and Peasants.
