= Party of Greens of Ukraine =

Political party in Ukraine

Party of Greens of Ukraine Партія зелених України
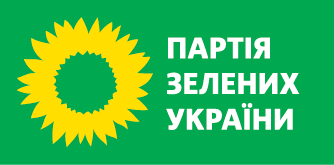
- Leader: Tetyana Bodun
- Founded: 24 May 1991 (registered)
- Headquarters: Kyiv
- Membership (2009): 28,000
- Ideology: Green politics
- Political position: Centre-left
- European affiliation: European Green Party
- International affiliation: Global Greens
- Verkhovna Rada: 0 / 450
- Regional councils: 0 / 1,804
- Local councils: 36 / 158,399

Website
- www.greenparty.ua

The Party of Greens of Ukraine (Ukrainian: Партія зелених України, romanized: Partiia zelenykh Ukrayiny, PZU) is a Ukrainian green political party founded in 1990 by Yuriy Shcherbak and registered in May 1991.

The party is a successor of the Green World Association (founded December 1987) and under that name participated in the Ukrainian parliamentary elections of 1990 as part of the Democratic Bloc. The Green World Association quickly transformed itself into the Party of Greens of Ukraine.

After being electorally successful in the late 20th century, the party became nationally electorally marginal but representatives of the party are present in regional and local governing bodies.

== Overview ==
The party's main priorities are the alteration of anti-ecological attitudes in the economic system, the reconstruction of the social system, and the protection of human rights.

The Party has been a member of the European Green Party since January 1994.

The registration certificate of the similarly-named Green Party of Ukraine was cancelled in November 2011 because it had not nominated a candidate in an election since the parliamentary elections of 1998.

== Electoral history ==
In the 1998 parliamentary election, the Ukrainian Greens received 5.5% of the vote and 19 seats in the Verkhovna Rada (Ukrainian parliament). According to historian Andrew Wilson, during this period the party was more of a sanctuary for oligarchs than a legitimate green party, as oligarchs dominated the party's election list.

The 1998 success wasn't repeated in the 2002 election, in which final poll results had predicted that the party would receive between 4% and 5% of the total vote. However, the party fell below expectations and earned a mere 1.3% of the total vote, losing all its seats. In the 2006 parliamentary elections and the 2007 parliamentary elections, the party received 0.54% and 0.40% respectively and failed to earn seats in parliament both times.

The party participated in the 2012 parliamentary elections, in which it won 0.35% of the national vote and none of the fifteen constituencies in which it had competed and thus failed to win parliamentary representation. The party also participated in the 2014 Ukrainian parliamentary election, but received 0.24%, which once again was not enough to gain parliamentary representation. In the 2019 Ukrainian parliamentary election the party gained 0.66% of the national vote and no parliamentary seats, with the party also failing to win a constituency seat.

In the 2020 Ukrainian local elections, the party gained 24 deputies (0.06% of all available mandates).

== Election results ==
=== Verkhovna Rada ===
Election	Popular vote	Percentage	Overall seats	Change	Outcome
1990	Democratic Bloc (Note: As a member of the "Narodna Rada" group)		125 / 450	—	Opposition
1994	71,946	0.3	0 / 450	New	Extra-parliamentary
1998	1,444,264	5.44	19 / 450	▲19	Minority support
2002	338,252	1.31	0 / 450	▼19	Extra-parliamentary
2006	137,858	0.54	0 / 450	0	Extra-parliamentary
2007	94,505	0.41	0 / 450	0	Extra-parliamentary
2012	70,316	0.35	0 / 450	0	Extra-parliamentary
2014	39,636	0.25	0 / 450	0	Extra-parliamentary
2019	96,659	0.66	0 / 450	0	Extra-parliamentary

== Notable people ==
- Pavlo Khazan, Ukrainian ecologist

== See also ==
- Conservation movement
- Environmental movement
- Green party
- List of environmental organizations
