= Ukraine United =

Political party in Ukraine

The Political Party "Ukraine United" (Ukrainian: Політична партія «Україна соборна»; Politychna Partiya "Ukrayina Soborna") is a political party in Ukraine registered in 2005.

== History ==
At the legislative elections, 2006 the party was part of the Ukrainian National Bloc of Kostenko and Plyushch. At the legislative elections, 2007 the party was part of Ukrainian People's Bloc. Both times the blocs won no seats.

The party is since October 2008 a member of the electoral alliance Ukrainian block (Ukrainian: Український блок) led by Stepan Khmara. On 17 November 2011 the Ukrainian Parliament approved an election law that banned the participation of blocs of political parties in parliamentary elections.

In the 2010 local elections the party won 4 seats in the Lviv City Council.

The party did not participate in the 2012 parliamentary elections. And again not in the 2014 Ukrainian parliamentary election.
