= Nova Obodivka =

Village in Vinnytsia Oblast, Ukraine

Nova Obodivka Нова Ободівка
- Village
- Location in Vinnytsia Oblast Nova Obodivka (Ukraine)
- Coordinates: 48°24′44″N 29°14′41″E
- Country: Ukraine
- Oblast: Vinnytsia Oblast
- Raion: Haisyn Raion
- Hromada: Obodivka rural hromada
- Time zone: UTC+2 (EET)
  - Summer (DST): UTC+3 (EEST)
- Postal code: 24357

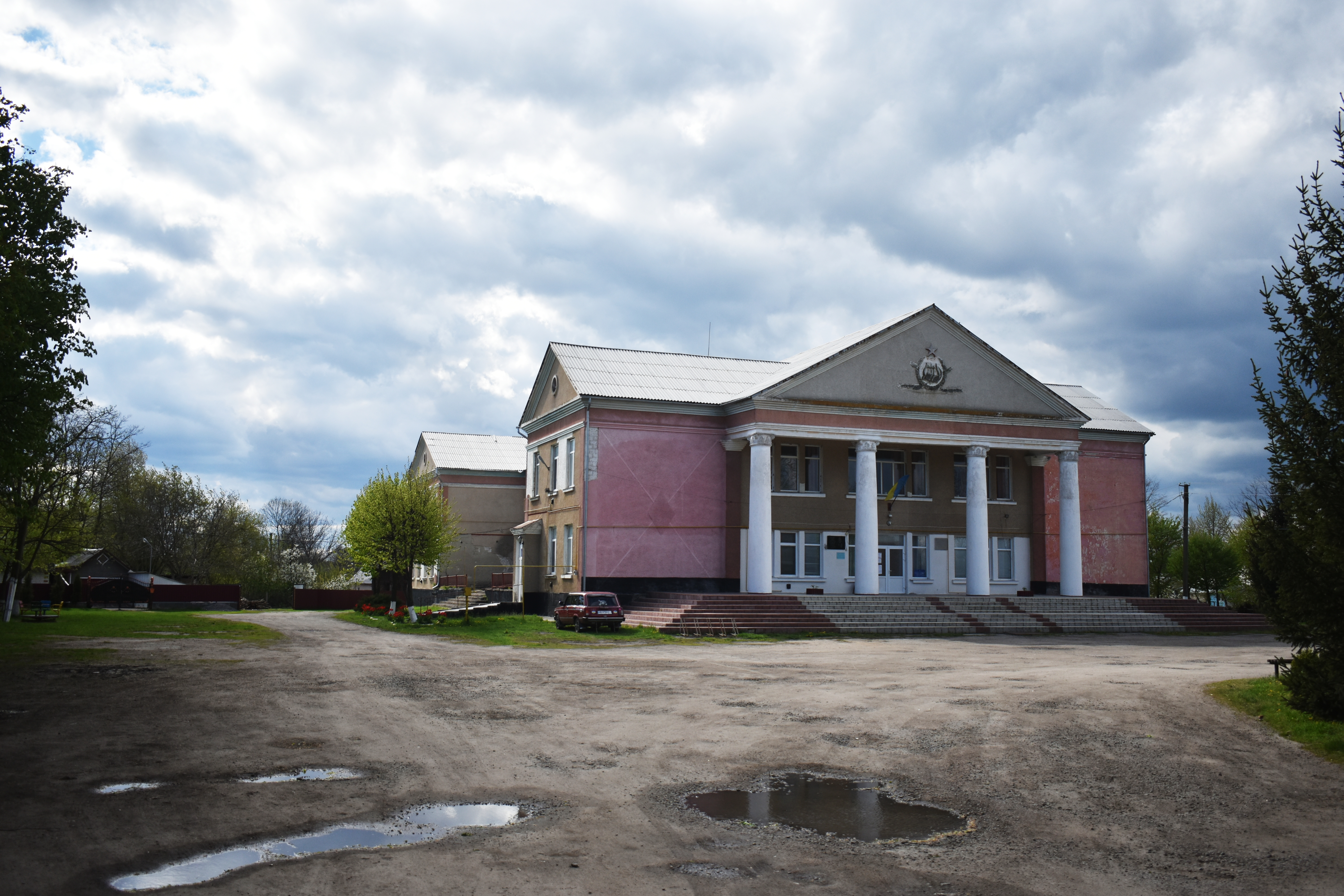
House of Culture in the village

Nova Obodivka (Ukrainian: Нова Ободівка) is a village in the Obodivka rural hromada of the Haisyn Raion of Vinnytsia Oblast in Ukraine.

== History ==
The village has discovered artifacts from the 7th–6th centuries BC and the 10th–11th centuries.

After the liquidation of the Trostianets Raion on 19 July 2020, the village became part of the Haisyn Raion.

== Religion ==
- St. Michael church.

== Notable residents ==
- Oleksa Novakivskyi (1872–1935), Ukrainian painter
- Yuriy Kostenko (born 1951), Ukrainian politician
