= Pavlo Khazan =

Ukrainian scientist and politician

Lt. Col. English: Pavlo Khazan Ukrainian: Павло Хазан
- Born: November 17, 1974 (age 51); Dnipropetrovsk, Ukrainian SSR, Soviet Union
- Citizenship: Ukraine
- Education: Oles Honchar Dnipro National University
- Occupations: Ukrainian Deputy of Dnipropetrovsk Oblast Council of the VII and VIII convocations; Scientist; Public Figure
- Awards: Order of Merit (Ukraine) Armed Forces Badge of Honour, Armed Forces Meritorious Service Medal, Badge for Exemplary Service and Other Military Decorations
Pavlo Khazan
- Conflicts: Russian War in Ukraine

Pavlo Khazan (born November 17, 1974, Dnipropetrovsk) is a Ukrainian scientist, politician, Colonel of the Armed Forces of Ukraine, participant in the Russian War in Ukraine, co-founder of the environmental monitoring system, and a Deputy of the Dnipropetrovsk Oblast Council (VII and VIII convocation).

== Biography ==
Pavlo Khazan is a developer of civil and military engineering systems, author of scientific papers on ecology, renewable energy, economics and statistics, the author and participant of the international music album "Source" (Freiburg, 1995) and the documentary film " When the bells will ring..." about the environmental disaster in Ukraine, co-author of regional environmental strategies and programs. The author of music and songs based on his own poems, as well as on poems by Charles Baudelaire and others.

== Career ==
He is a physicist and electrical engineer by training with a Ph.D. in statistics. In 1996 he graduated from the Oles Honchar Dnipro National University, where he also completed a military course and commissioned in Army reserve as a lieutenant. In 2000 he completed post-graduate studies at the National Academy of Sciences of Ukraine majoring in environmental safety and in 2008 he held a scholarship of the John Smith Trust in the UK.

Since 1991, Khazan was a member of the environmental movement, participated in international campaigns Towards the Sustainable Europe, Sustainable Use Resources in Europe, and Energy Alternatives for Sustainable Europe. In 1994 he founded the Youth Environmental League of Prydniprovya . Since 1996 he engaged in research in the field of sustainable development, renewable energy sources, environmental monitoring, mathematical modelling, and development of waste management programs at the Institute of Ecology of the National Academy of Sciences of Ukraine. He is an expert in energy and green economy projects in cooperation with the British Council and the Deutsche Gesellschaft für Internationale Zusammenarbeit. Led various public campaigns, including anti-shale gas (compacted sandstone gas) in Ukraine in cooperation with Milieudefensie and Friends of the Earth.

From 2003 to 2008 he participated in the work of the UN Sustainable Development Commission. He was engaged in the development and implementation of international conventions, in particular the electronic tools of the Convention on access to information, public participation in the decision-making process and access to justice on issues related to the environment (the Aarhus Convention). He was a participant of the UN Conference on Sustainable Development (Earth Summit 2012) in Rio de Janeiro, Brazil.

During 2007-2012 he was an organizer of the public campaigns to close the landfill on Igren and against illegal construction on Lots-Kamyanka in Dnipro., he was also a Deputy chairman of the Green Party of Ukraine and Ukrainian representative to the European Green Party, participated in the preparation of program documents in cooperation with The Greens/EFA group in the European Parliament. From 2013 to 2014 he was one of the organisers of the Euromaidan in Dnipro, participant of the Revolution of Dignity in Kyiv. In January 2014, during protests near the Dnipropetrovsk Regional State Administration, his eyes were injured.

Since 2015, he has been a deputy of the Dnipropetrovsk Oblast Council, a member of the Environmental and Energy Committee. Co-author of the Comprehensive Program for Environmental Safety and Climate Change Prevention, the Strategy for Energy Saving, Energy Efficiency and Development of Renewable Energy Sources. The documents are based on the principles of the UN Framework Convention on Climate Change, the Kyoto Protocol and the Paris Agreement. An important goal of the strategy is the complete abandonment of fossil fuels. Co-founder of the Environmental Monitoring Centre, where he was Head of Science and Engineering. The monitoring system became a practical implementation of the principles of the Aarhus Convention. He is a co-author of the report Environmental conferences of Russian War in Ukraine in 2022.

Lt. Col. Khazan is a veteran of the Russian War in Ukraine, participated in the Anti-Terrorist operation (2014-2015, 2017-2018), the Joint Forces Operation (2018-2020), and since 25 February 2022 when the Russia full scale invasion started he has mobilised again. Khazan has been serving in the Armed Forces of Ukraine as a C4 and Cyber officer, the C4ISR Group Commander and the Chief of the Unmanned Aviation Department. He has volunteered through the same military territorial centre where his grandfather Boris Khazan was sent to the Second World War as a volunteer in 1941.
