= Democratic Bloc (Ukraine) =

Political alliance in Ukraine

People's Council Народна Рада
- Leader: Ihor Yukhnovskyi
- Founded: 1990
- Dissolved: 1994
- Ideology: Liberal democracy Anti-communism
- Political position: Big tent
- Verkhovna Rada (1990): 125 / 450

The Democratic Bloc (Ukrainian: Демократичний Блок; Demokratychnyi Blok) was a political alliance and an electoral bloc in Ukraine founded during the election campaign to participate in the parliamentary election held in March 1990.

== History ==
The elections in the spring of 1990 were the first where the Soviet-authorities allowed the formation of full-fledged political parties that varied in their political agendas. The first democratic bloc that consisted of smaller parties was formed during the election. The "Democratic Bloc" included the People's Movement of Ukraine (Rukh), Helsinki Watch Committee of Ukraine, Green World Association, and other organizations. It managed to obtain 111 seats out of 442 in Verkhovna Rada (Ukraine's parliament). The democratic deputies formed the "Narodna Rada" group, which consisted of around 90 to 125 members and was the opposition to the conservative-communist "group of 239" in the parliament ("for the sovereign Soviet Ukraine"). Ihor Yukhnovskyi became the leader of the group. The considered lack of parliamentary seats for the "Democratic Bloc" became one of the causes of the October 1990 "Revolution on Granite". (Note: The October 1990 "Revolution on Granite" was the first of Ukraine's large-scale radical protest campaigns of Ukraine centered on Maidan Nezalezhnosti (the other ones being the 2001 "Ukraine without Kuchma", the 2004 Orange Revolution, and the 2013–14 Euromaidan).)

In the 1990 Ukrainian local elections "Democratic Bloc" won the elections in Lviv Oblast, Ivano-Frankivsk Oblast and Ternopil Oblast.

During the next parliamentary election of 1994 the above-mentioned parties didn't cooperate as "Democratic Bloc" but rather went their separate ways. Eventually, by the end of the 2000s, the People's Movement of Ukraine became part of the Our Ukraine block. Helsinki Watch Committee of Ukraine ceased to exist. Its 1990s offspring, Ukrainian Republican Party merged with Ukrainian People's Party and became part of Our Ukraine. The Green World Association transformed itself into the Party of Greens of Ukraine, but that party hasn't won any seats in the Ukrainian Parliament since the 1998 parliamentary election.

After the 2012 Ukrainian parliamentary election only People's Movement of Ukraine was represented in Verkhovna Rada. In the 2014 Ukrainian parliamentary election this party participated in 3 constituencies; but its candidates lost in all of them and thus the party won no parliamentary seats.
