= 1990 Ukrainian Supreme Soviet election =

- 4 March 1990 (first round) 10–18 March 1990 (second round)

All 450 seats in the Supreme Soviet 226 seats needed for a majority
- Turnout: 85% (first round); 79% (second round)
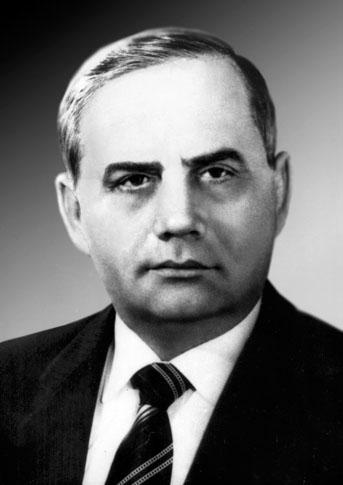

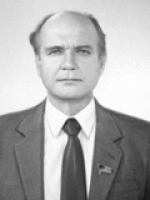
	Majority party	Minority party
Leader	Volodymyr Ivashko	Ihor Yukhnovsky
Party	CPU	Rukh
Alliance		Democratic Bloc
Seats won	331	111
Seat change	▼119	New
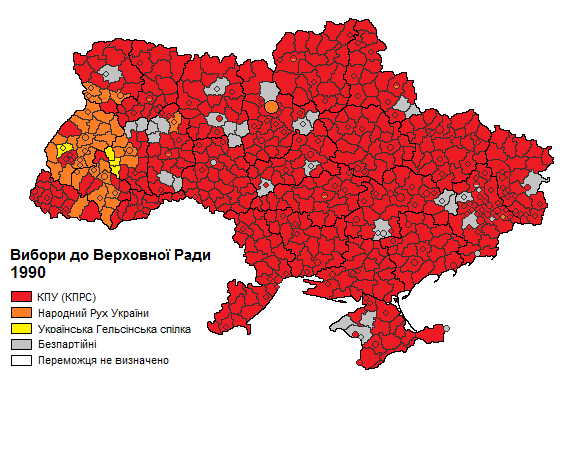
- Results by constituency
Chairman of the Supreme Soviet before election
Platon Kostiuk
CPU
Elected Chairman of the Supreme Soviet
Volodymyr Ivashko
CPU

Supreme Soviet elections were held in the Ukrainian SSR on 4 March 1990, with runoffs in some seats held between 10 and 18 March. The elections were held to elect deputies to the republic's parliament, the Verkhovna Rada. Simultaneously, elections of oblast councils also took place in their respective administrative divisions.

They were the first relatively free elections held in the SSR, and the closest thing to a free election Ukraine had seen since the unfinished 1918 Constituent Assembly elections. Although the campaign was far from being clear and transparent, representatives of the Democratic Bloc were the first to provide a legal challenge to the authority of the Communist Party of the Ukrainian SSR in parliament. A total of 442 National Deputies were elected – short of the 450 seat total, due to low voter turnout.

The parliamentary convocation that convened after the 1990 election declared the independence of Ukraine from the Soviet Union on 24 August 1991. Later, an amendment to the official number of parliamentary convocations recognized this 12th convocation of the Supreme Soviet of the Ukrainian SSR as the first convocation of the Verkhovna Rada.

== Background ==
In the wake of Mikhail Gorbachev's perestroika, the Law on Elections – adopted on 27 October 1989 – included provisions for direct elections of individuals (as opposed to group representation of civic organizations), the need for alternative (non-Communist) candidates, the elimination of a requirement for nomination meetings, and other relatively democratic provisions. However, the elections were far from being free – as the Communist Party retained control on the media, exerted political influence, and had a large financial resource base.

== Electoral system ==
The elections took place according to the majoritarian electoral system in 450 electoral regions. In electoral regions where no candidate obtained at least 50% of the vote, a second round of elections was held.

The number of seats in the Supreme Soviet was reduced from 650 to 450.

== Campaign ==
A total of 2,999 candidates contested the 450 seats, with four constituencies having only one candidate.

During the election campaign, the self-titled "Democratic Bloc" was formed, which included the People's Movement of Ukraine (Rukh), the Ukrainian Helsinki Union, the Green Party of Ukraine, and many other organizations.

== Results ==
In the first round 112 candidates were elected. A further 330 were elected in the second round, leaving eight seats vacant due to low voter turnout. Further rounds of voting in six constituencies were scheduled for 22 April.

The Communists obtained 331 seats in the Rada. The Democratic Bloc obtained 111 seats out of 442. In the parliament, the democratic deputies formed the "Narodna Rada" (People's Council) group, which consisted of 90 to 125 members. Narodna Rada became the opposition bloc to the parliamentary majority and Ihor Yukhnovskyi was elected as the opposition group's leader.

=== Factions ===
- For a Soviet Sovereign Ukraine / "Group of 239" (Communist Party of Ukraine) – 239
- People's Council (People's Movement of Ukraine) – 125
- CPU Democratic platform (Party of Democratic Revival of Ukraine) – 41
- Democratic Party of Ukraine (Democratic Party of Ukraine) – 19
- Ukrainian Republican Party (Ukrainian Republican Party) – 12
- Unaffiliated members of parliament – 14

== Aftermath ==
The first meeting of the Parliament took place on 15 May 1990. The Communist deputies elected Volodymyr Ivashko to serve as the Parliament Chairman, but on 19 July 1991 he chose to move to Moscow for the position of Deputy General Secretary of the Communist Party of the Soviet Union. The Ukrainian Communists were rapidly losing popularity; by July 1990 ninety-two of the deputies elected as Communists declared themselves as "Independents". The remaining 239 communist deputies formed a new majority group they called "For a Soviet Sovereign Ukraine", informally known as the "group of 239".

On 16 July 1990 this Parliament adopted the Declaration of State Sovereignty of Ukraine. The Declaration was supported by 355 deputies.

On 18 July the "For a Soviet Sovereign Ukraine" group led by Oleksander Moroz elected Leonid Kravchuk as the Chairman of Parliament.

On 24 October 1990 the Parliament amended the 1978 Constitution of the Ukrainian SSR, in particular to exclude Article 6. Prior to the amendments, the supreme governing body of the Ukrainian SSR was the Central Committee of the Communist Party of the Ukrainian SSR.

On 24 August 1991 the parliament declared Ukraine independent and called for a referendum on support for the Declaration of Independence. In the following days it also banned the Communist Party of Ukraine and nationalized its property (this ban was only theoretical since de facto the Communist elite continued to rule the country).

On 5 December 1991 Leonid Kravchuk surrendered his parliamentary duties to accept the presidency of an independent Ukraine. The post of Parliament Chairman was awarded to Ivan Plyushch.

After the banning of the Communist Party of Ukraine, remnants of its elected deputies (the "group of 239") joined other left-wing parties; most became independent politicians.

=== Statistics ===
The first convocation had eight sessions where 85 legal documents were submitted. Six of the legal projects were initiated by the President of Ukraine and 38 by the Cabinet of Ministers. The most productive sessions were the last two (the 7th and 8th) where 60 legal projects were submitted.

== Government leaders ==
Below is a list of the Chairmen of the 1st Convocation of the Verkhovna Rada of Ukraine.

Name	Party/Bloc	Date Elected	Date Resigned	Convocation	Comments
Volodymyr Ivashko	Communist	June 4, 1990	July 9, 1990	1 (12)	Resigned when elected to the Politburo of the CPSU.
Leonid Kravchuk	Communist	July 23, 1990	December 5, 1991	1 (12)	Resigned as a result of his election as president.
Ivan Plyushch	Independent	December 5, 1991	May 11, 1994	1 (12)	

=== Prime minister ===
Note: an appointment to this office had little influence from the Verkhovna Rada until the constitutional reforms of 2004.

#	Picture	Name	Took office	Left office	Party	Notes
1		Vitold Fokin	23 October 1990	2 October 1992	Communist Party of the Ukr. SSR / Non-partisan	acting to 14 November 1990 (continued from above)
—		Valentyn Symonenko	2 October 1992	13 October 1992	Non-partisan	acting
2		Leonid Kuchma	13 October 1992	22 September 1993	Non-partisan	
—		Yukhym Zvyahilsky	22 September 1993	16 June 1994	Non-partisan	acting
3		Vitaliy Masol	16 June 1994	1 March 1995	Non-partisan	

== See also ==
- List of members of the parliament of Ukraine, 1990–1994
- 1990 Ukrainian local elections
