= Peasant Bloc Agricultural Ukraine =

Peasant Bloc Agricultural Ukraine (Ukrainian: Селянський Блок Аграрна Україна) is a political party in Ukraine.

== History ==
On July 20, 2005, it was created under the name People's Party New Ukraine. It did not run in the 2006 Ukrainian parliamentary election. In the 30 September 2007 elections, the party as such failed as part of the Peasants' Bloc "Agrarian Ukraine" to win parliamentary representation. In 2008, the party changed its name to Peasant Bloc Agricultural Ukraine. The party did not participate in the 2012 parliamentary elections. And again did not participate in the 2014 Ukrainian parliamentary election.
