= Peasants' Bloc "Agrarian Ukraine" =

Ukrainian political bloc

The Peasants' Bloc "Agrarian Ukraine" (Ukrainian: Селянський блок «Аграрна Україна») was an electoral bloc in Ukraine. In the 30 September 2007 elections, the bloc failed to win parliamentary representation.

Formed August 2007 the bloc at first had 2 members:

- Rural Revival Party
- People's Party New Ukraine (later changed to the party "Peasant Bloc Agricultural Ukraine")

Later that year the Ukrainian Peasant Democratic Party joined the bloc.
