= People's Movement of Ukraine =

Ukrainian pro-independence organisation, then political party

People's Movement of Ukraine Народний Рух України
- Abbreviation: NRU; Rukh
- Leader: Andriy Kornat
- Founded: 8 September 1989
- Registered: 9 February 1990
- Headquarters: Kyiv
- Youth wing: Young People's Movement
- Membership (2016): 35,000
- Ideology: Ukrainian nationalism; National Democracy; Liberalism; Conservatism; Liberal conservatism
- Political position: Centre-right
- European affiliation: European People's Party (until 2013)
- Colours: Blue; Yellow
- Slogan: Statehood, Democracy, Reforms
- Verkhovna Rada: 0 / 450
- Lviv Oblast Council: 6 / 84
- Regions: 202 / 43,122

Website
- rukh.team

The People's Movement of Ukraine (Ukrainian: Народний Рух України, romanized: Narodnyi Rukh Ukrayiny) is a Ukrainian political party and one of the first opposition parties in Soviet Ukraine. It is often simply referred to as the Movement (Ukrainian: Рух, romanized: Rukh). The party under the name Rukh was an observer member of the European People's Party (EPP) until 2013. It is considered to have played a key role in Ukraine regaining its independence in 1991.

Rukh gathers most of its voters and support from Western Ukraine. In November 2016, the party had 35,000 members.

== History ==
=== Public movement ===
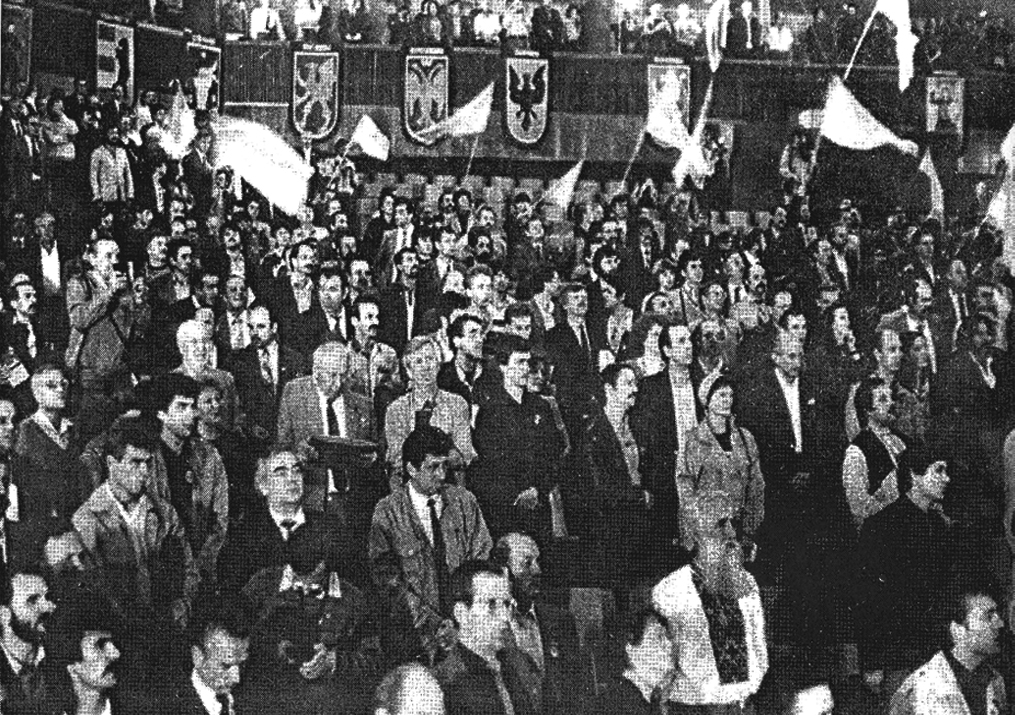
Inaugural congress of the movement in Kyiv, 1989

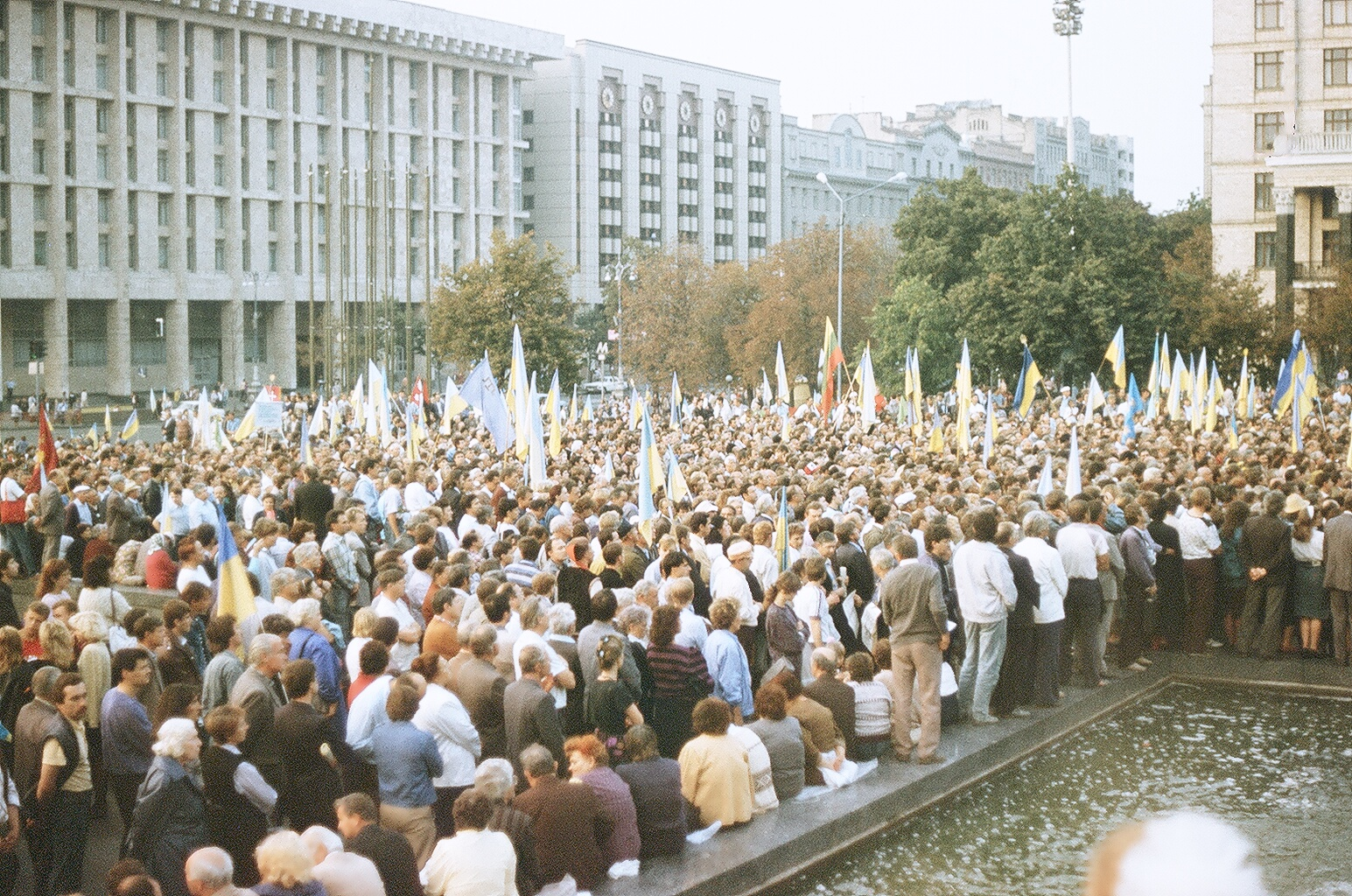
Gathering of People's Movement of Ukraine at the October Revolution Square (now Maidan Nezalezhnosti) during the raising of the Ukrainian flag in Kyiv on 24 July 1990

Initially organized as the "People's Movement of Ukraine for Perestroika", Rukh was founded in September 6–8, 1989 as a civil-political movement as there were no other political parties allowed in the Soviet Union but the Communist Party. The founding of Rukh was made possible due to Soviet General Secretary Mikhail Gorbachev's Glasnost policies. The program and statutes of the movement were proposed by the Writers Association of Ukraine and were published in the journal Literary Ukraine (Literaturna Ukraina) on 16 February 1989. The organization has its roots in Ukrainian dissidents — the most notable of them being Viacheslav Chornovil — yet not excluding the fact that it was accepting various other politically oriented members from liberal communists to integralist nationalists. From March to September 1989 numerous constituent party conferences took place across Ukraine. The first Constituent Congress of the "People's Movement of Ukraine for Reconstruction" took place on 8–10 September 1989 in Kyiv. Elected as the first leader of the movement was the Ukrainian poet and screenwriter Ivan Drach.

Appearance of the organization coincided with dismissal of Volodymyr Shcherbytsky as the First Secretary of Central Committee of the Communist Party of Ukraine and rise of Leonid Kravchuk. On one hand Kravchuk officially promised that "faster he will grow hair on his palm than Rukh will be registered", on the other hand according to author of the book "People's Movement of Ukraine. History" (Ukrainian: Народний рух України. Історія), Hryhoriy Honcharuk, with reference to Ivan Drach, it was Kravchuk who facilitated publishing of the Rukh's program draft in "Literaturna Ukrayina" in February 1989. And according to rumors, he also approved that the rector of KPI Talanchuk would grant the Politech's Assembly Hall to hold the Rukh's constituent congress.

The official Soviet press and government portrayed members as anti-Semites at first.

The movement's biggest public, political, cultural, and social actions were:

- Human chain (1990) – a chain of volunteers that stretched around 550 kilometres (340 mi) all the way from the city of Lviv to the city of Kyiv, the capitals of the two former Ukrainian states that signed the Act Zluky (Unification act) on 22 January 1919. According to the Department of Internal Affairs (Ukrainian SSR) there were only 450,000 participants, while the organizers claimed that there were between four and five million.
- Mass excursions (1990) – festivities near Nikopol and Zaporizhzhia to celebrate the 500th anniversary of the Zaporozhian Sich from 7 September through 12.
- Various activities near Berestechko, Baturyn, Lubny, and Khotyn.

At first the movement aimed at supporting Gorbachev's reforms, later the People's Movement of Ukraine was instrumental in conducting an independence referendum in the Ukrainian SSR. This was partially due to the Russification policies of the Soviet Union when the USSR Supreme Soviet officially announced the Russian language as the singular official state language of the country in 1989. During Rukh's existence within the Soviet Union, its members were threatened and intimidated. In the western oblasts "Rukh" became colloquially known as an abbreviation for the call Save Ukraine, fellows! (Рятуйте Україну, Хлопці!).

=== Political party ===
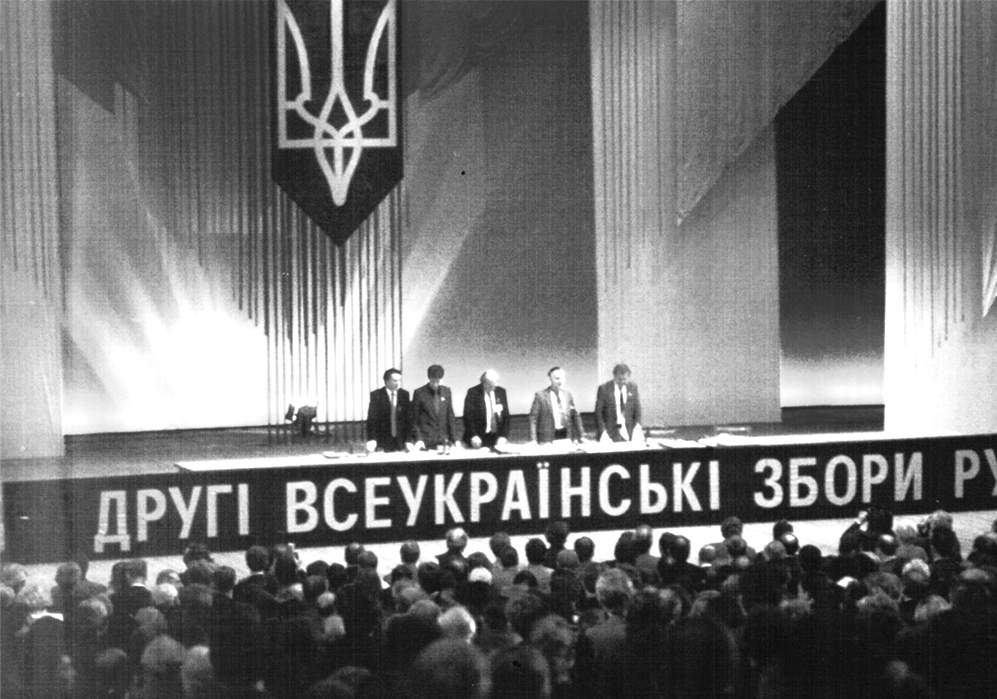
2nd Congress of the People's Movement of Ukraine, 1990

The movement initially registered by the Ministry of Justice on 9 February 1990 as the political party. After the creation of the Ukrainian Republican Party (URP) in January 1990 and later the Democratic Party of Ukraine (DemPU), the People's Movement of Ukraine unofficially existed as a coalition of those two along with numerous other smaller factions. These parties created a group within the Verkhovna Rada called the "Democratic Bloc" which stood in opposition to "Group 239", which was led by Oleksandr Moroz ("For the sovereign Soviet Ukraine") (see 1990 Ukrainian parliamentary election).

In the March 1990 Ukrainian local elections Rukh won majorities in the elections of the city councils of Lviv and Kiev and was successful in western Ukraine.

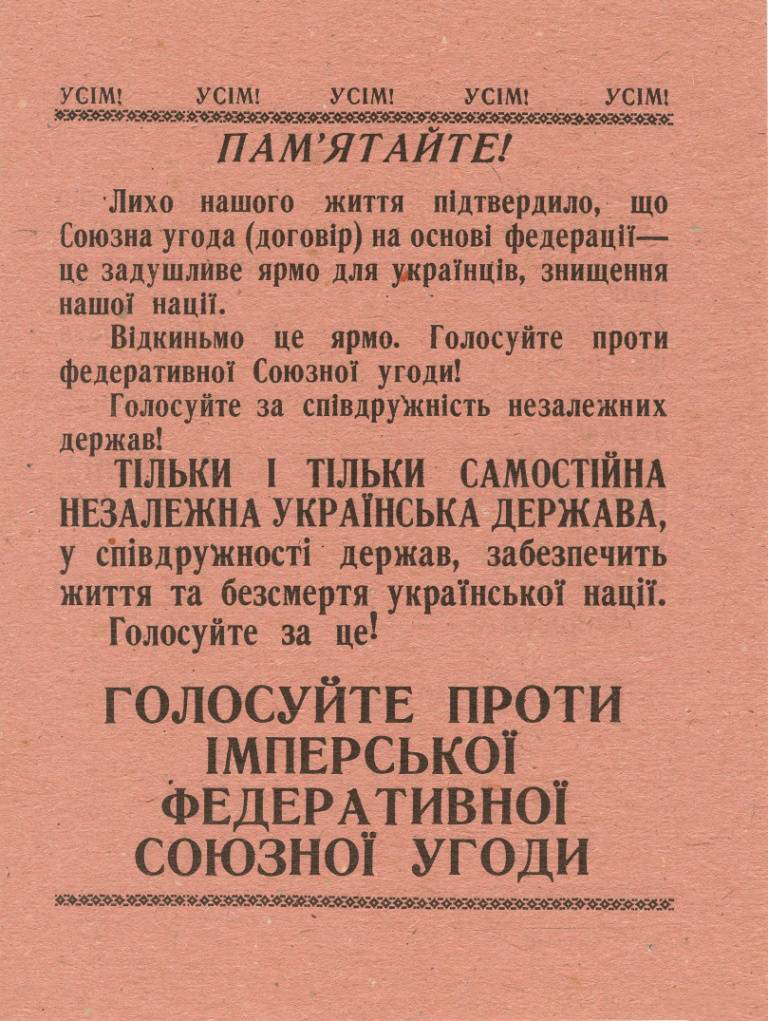
A leaflet in support of Ukraine's independence spread by Rukh activists in 1991

In October 1990 Rukh's second Party Congress took place. During the session it was decided to exclude the word "Reconstruction" (Perestroika), not to be associated with the Communist movement. Ivan Drach was re-elected as leader, while his deputies became Mykhailo Horyn and Oleksandr Lavrynovych. In order to draw the URP and DemPU closer to Rukh, the "Institute of Associative Membership in the Movement" was established. The brittle coalition of the mentioned parties held until the presidential elections in December 1991 when URP and DemPU provided their own candidates in opposition to Vyacheslav Chornovil.

From 28 February – 1 March 1992 the third Party Congress took place during which a schism within Rukh was avoided by electing a leadership triad of Ivan Drach, Mykhailo Horyn, and Vyacheslav Chornovil. The new deputy leaders were M. Boychyshyn, O. Burakovsky, V. Burlakov, and O. Lavrynovych. The "Institute of Associative Membership in the Movement" was formally recognized as dissolved due to both the URP and DemPU declaring themselves as supporters of state president Leonid Kravchuk. The People's Movement of Ukraine declared its parliamentary opposition to the government and in January 1992 re-registered due to substantial changes in its statutes. Soon Ivan Drach left the party, followed by the resignation of Mykhailo Horyn in June 1992 together with V. Burlakov. Horyn was soon elected as leader of the Ukrainian Republican Party. In December 1992 Rukh's IV Party Congress took place which once again revised its statute and the party's goals. Vyacheslav Chornovil was elected leader, the rest of the party's leadership was left without major changes. During the Congress some party delegates in opposition to Chornovil created the All-National Movement of Ukraine (VNRU), headed by Larysa Skoryk. The People's Movement of Ukraine was registered by the Ukrainian Ministry of Justice as a political party on 1 February 1993.

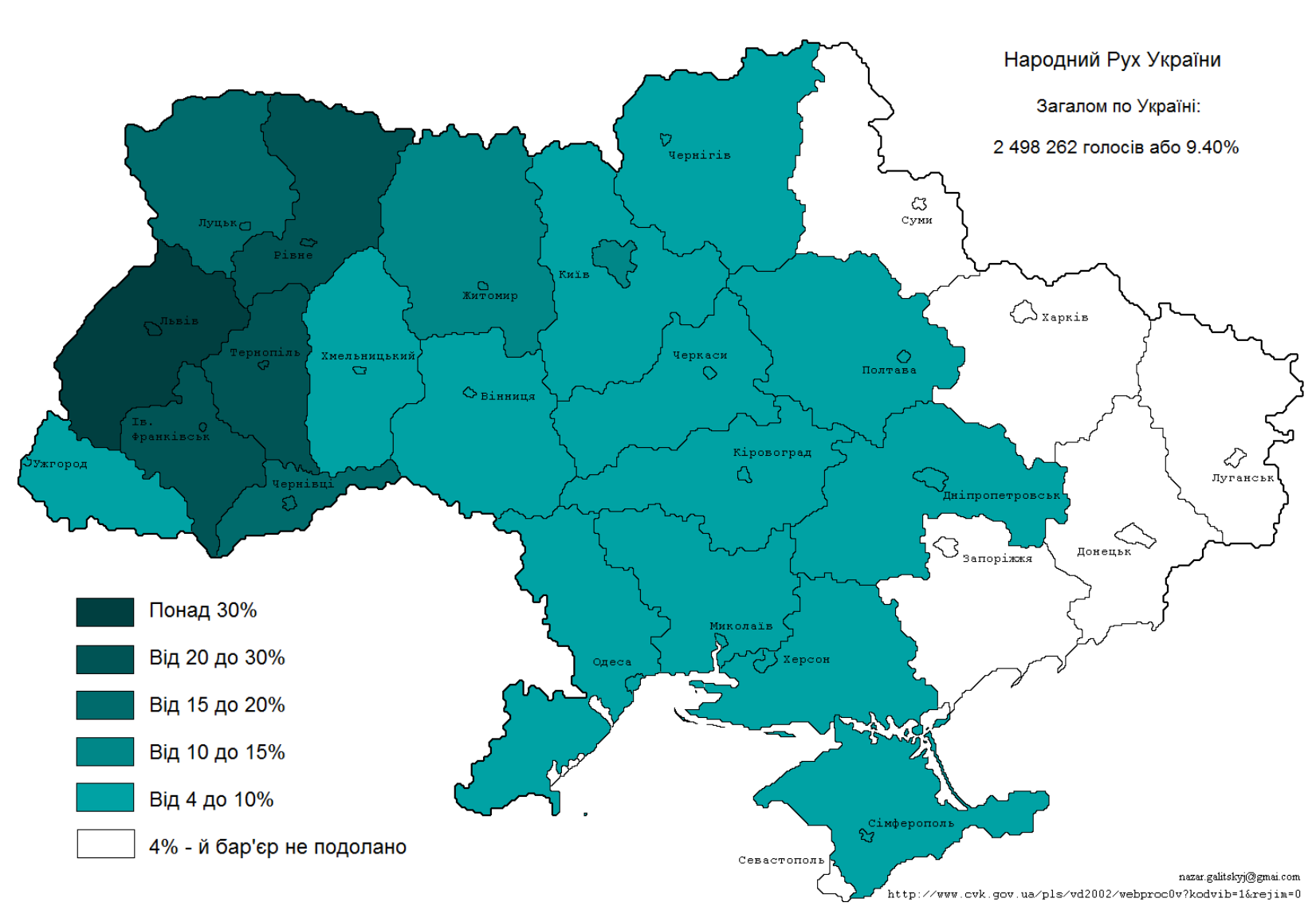
Rukh's results in the 1998 parliamentary election (by region)

In the parliamentary elections on 29 March 1998, the party received 9.4% of the vote and 46 seats. Rukh's parliamentary faction split up into 2 different factions in the spring of 1999 (the breakaway faction was led by Hennadiy Udovenko with its highest Rada membership of 19 dwindling to 14; the "other" faction ended with 23; meaning that 10 elected People's Movement of Ukraine deputies did not represent any segment of the party anymore by June 2002).

Right before the 1999 presidential elections another major schism took place within the party. Yuriy Kostenko openly protested against the election of Viacheslav Chornovil as the party leader and established another party, People's Movement of Ukraine (Kostenko), where Kostenko became the leader of the party. Despite the split a followed party congress elected Vyacheslav Chornovil as party leader. The congress also adopted the signing of an agreement between People's Movement of Ukraine and the Reforms and Order Party for a political bloc supporting Hennadiy Udovenko as a single presidential candidate for the next elections. In the parliamentary elections on 30 March 2002, the party joined the Viktor Yushchenko Bloc–Our Ukraine, and subsequently became a part of the Our Ukraine Bloc, where it represented the right wing of the Union's party spectrum. In the parliamentary elections on 26 March 2006, Rukh was part of the Our Ukraine alliance, and its members secured 13 seats in the parliament. In the 2007 parliamentary elections it once again ran as part of the Our Ukraine–People's Self-Defense Bloc alliance, that won 72 out of 450 seats.

In the 2010 local elections the party won 8 representatives in the regional parliament of the Lviv Oblast, 3 representative in the regional parliament of Ivano-Frankivsk Oblast, 1 in Kherson Oblast, 5 in the Verkhovna Rada of Crimea and 3 seats in the city councils of Lviv and Simferopol.

During the 2012 parliamentary elections, Rukh competed under the "umbrella" party "Fatherland", together with several other forces. During the election this list won 62 seats (25.55% of the votes) under the proportional party-list system and another 39 by winning 39 simple-majority constituencies; a total of 101 seats in Parliament. The party independently unsuccessfully participated in 2 constituencies.

In 2013, Rukh split in two parts, one of which merged with Ukrainian People's Party in May 2013, meanwhile the former party chairman Borys Tarasyuk and some other members assimilated into "Fatherland" in June 2013. The bulk of the party organisation and ordinary members remained loyal to the party.

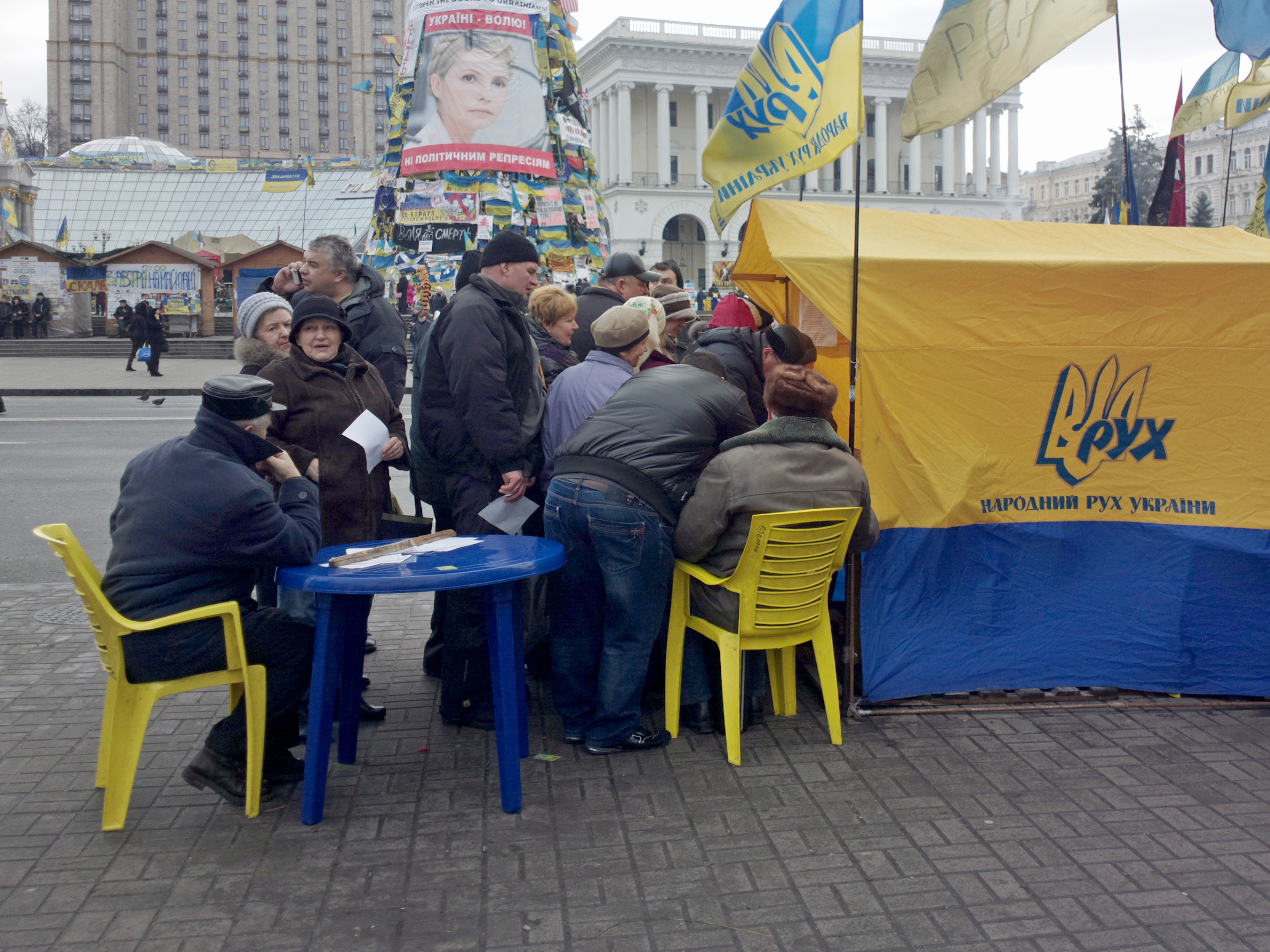
Rukh supporters during the Euromaidan protests in Kyiv, 2014

In the 2014 Ukrainian presidential election party leader Vasyl Kuybida received 0.06% of the vote.

In the 2014 Ukrainian parliamentary election the party participated in 3 constituencies; but its candidates lost in all of them and thus the party won no parliamentary seats. However, after being expelled from (the political party) Self Reliance the lawmakers Pavlo Kyshkar and Viktor Kryvenko joined the party in April 2016 (in parliament they both joined the faction of the Petro Poroshenko Bloc in March 2016 before leaving it in December 2017). In the 2015 Ukrainian local elections the party was able to gain seats in 261 local councils (0.17% of all local councils).

On 10 January 2019 Viktor Kryvenko was chosen the People's Movement of Ukraine candidate in the 2019 Ukrainian presidential election and their chairman. In the election he received 0.04% of the vote. In the 2019 Ukrainian parliamentary election the party had 18 candidates in constituencies, but none of them won a parliamentary seat. In the 2020 Ukrainian local elections the party gained 202 deputies (0.48% of all available mandates).

== Political platform ==
We do not impose on Russia how to interpret its own history. Why did Russia try and continues to try to impose on us the use of the Russian language? Why do Russians want to make us forget our own history and our heroes? Ukrainians must know their history and live accordingly, instead of living by the stereotypes spun by tsarist and Soviet ideologists.

— Party-leader Borys Tarasyuk on Echo of Moscow Radio (February 5, 2011)

Directly out of the official website:

- Further strengthening and development of the democratic roots of Ukrainian national statehood;
- Implementing the ideas of democracy, pluralism, social solidarity, and open society;
- Rebuilding the national economy on the principles of a freely competitive market system;
- Facilitating the development of private entrepreneurship;
- Systemic agrarian reform;
- Ensuring social security for every citizen, social assistance for those in need;
- Pension reform;
- The cultural revival of Ukrainian society, of the Ukrainian people's national identity, of the Ukrainian language in all spheres of public life;
- Integration into the EU and NATO as a vital cornerstone of Ukraine's foreign policy.

== Associated organizations ==
- Shevchenko Society of Ukrainian language (Ukrainian: Товариство української мови імені Тараса Шевченка)
- Lion's Society (Ukrainian: Товариство Лева)
- Committee in support of Lithuania (1990)
- Qurultay of the Crimean Tatar People
- Students' Fraternity of Lviv
- Ukrainian Student League

== Elections and leadership history ==
Supreme Council of Ukraine
Year	Party-list			Constituency /total	Overall seats won	Seat change	Government
Year	Popular vote	%	Seats /total	Constituency /total	Overall seats won	Seat change	Government
1990	no party list voting			15/450	15 / 450	▲15	opposition
1994	no party list voting			20/450	20 / 450	▲5	opposition
1998	2,498,262	9.7%	32/225	14/225	46 / 450	▲26	minority support
2002	Yushchenko Bloc Our Ukraine		15/225	3/225	18 / 450	▼8	opposition
2006	Bloc Our Ukraine		10/450	N/A	10 / 450	▼8	opposition
2007	Our Ukraine–People's Self-Defense Bloc		6/450	N/A	6 / 450	▼4	coalition government
2012	Fatherland-United Opposition				N/A	▼6	opposition
2014	unsuccessfully participated in 4 constituencies.						
2019	unsuccessfully participated in 18 constituencies.						

Presidency of Ukraine
Election year	Candidate	First Round		Place	Second Round	
Election year	Candidate	# of overall votes	% of overall vote	Place	# of overall votes	% of overall vote
1991	Viacheslav Chornovil	7,420,727	23.3	2		
1994	Volodymyr Lanovyi	2,483,986	9.6	4		
1999	Hennadiy Udovenko	319,778	1.2	7		
2004	none	fully supported Viktor Yushchenko				
2010	none	supported Yulia Tymoshenko in second round				
2014	Vasyl Kuybida	12,392	0.1	17		

Date	Party leader	Remarks
1989–1992	Ivan Drach	
1992–1999	Viacheslav Chornovil	
1999–2003	Hennadiy Udovenko	
2003–2012	Borys Tarasyuk	
2012–2017	Vasyl Kuybida	
2017–2021	Viktor Kryvenko	
since 2021	Andriy Kornat	

Local councils
Election	Performance				Rank
Election	%	± pp	Seats	+/–	Rank
2015	0.17%	New	261 / 158,399	New	20th
2020	0.48%	▲0.31	202 / 43,122	▼59	30th

== Notable politicians ==
- Yuriy Kostenko, Minister of Natural Environment in 1992–1998
- Volodymyr Lanovyi, Minister of Economy (Vice-Prime Minister) in 1991–1992
- Borys Tarasyuk, Minister of Foreign Affairs in 1998–2000 and 2005–2007
- Hennadiy Udovenko, Minister of Foreign Affairs in 1994–1998

== Notes ==
^{a} Temporarily merged with Batkivshchyna as Fatherland – United Opposition

== See also ==
- Qurultai-Rukh
