= Verkhovna Rada =

Unicameral legislature of Ukraine

Verkhovna Rada of Ukraine Supreme Council of Ukraine Верховна Рада України
- 9th Ukrainian Parliament
- Logo

Type
- Type: Unicameral

History
- Founded: 24 August 1991
- Preceded by: Supreme Soviet of the Ukrainian SSR

Leadership
- Chairman: Ruslan Stefanchuk, Servant of the People since 8 October 2021
- 1st Deputy Chairman: Oleksandr Korniyenko, Servant of the People since 19 October 2021
- 2nd Deputy Chairwoman: Olena Kondratiuk, Batkivshchyna since 29 August 2019

Structure
- Seats: 450
- Political groups: Government (Koretskyi Government) (229): Servant of the People (229); Supported by (75): Platform for Life and Peace (21) (Note: Parliamentary group formed from former deputies of Opposition Platform — For Life, which was suspended due to suspected Russian government ties. In the 24 March 2022 parliamentary sitting, five deputies announced their resignation from the OPFL. The Rada is consulting with the Ministry of Justice against the remaining deputies as Ukrainian law does not provide for a single mechanism for suspending the activities of a party represented in parliament. On 24 April 2022, MPs from OPFL created a deputy group Platform for Life and Peace); Dovira (19) (Note: Bila Tserkva Together (1); Samopomich (1)); Restoration of Ukraine (17); For the Future (18) (Note: UKROP (3); Our Land (2); Agrarian Party of Ukraine (1); Andriy Baloha's Team (1)); Opposition (69): European Solidarity (26); Batkivshchyna (24); Holos (20); Others (19): Independents (19) (Note: Svoboda (1)); Vacant (60): Vacant (60)

Elections
- Voting system: Open list proportional representation with 5% electoral threshold Formerly: Parallel voting: 225 seats are elected by Closed list proportional representation with 5% electoral threshold; 225 seats are elected by First-past-the-post
- First election: 27 March and 2–10 April 1994
- Last election: 21 July 2019
- Next election: Not scheduled (Martial law)

Meeting place
- Verkhovna Rada building, Kyiv, Ukraine
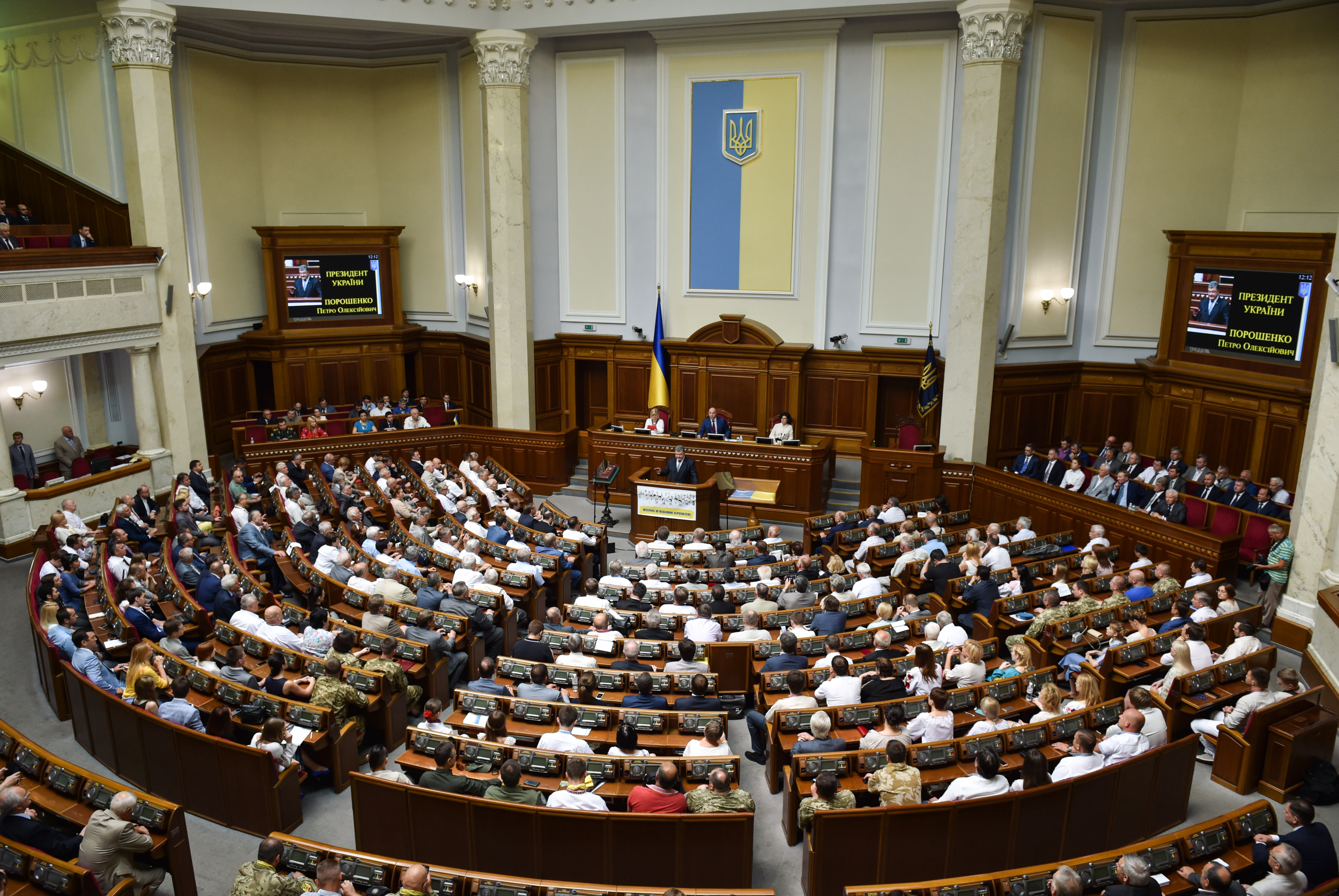

Website
- rada.gov.ua

Constitution
- Constitution of Ukraine: Chapter IV, Articles 75–101

Footnotes
- Due to the war in Donbas and the annexation of Crimea by the Russian Federation, only 424 of the parliament's 450 seats were elected in the 2019 election, leaving 26 vacant. The number of vacant seats had grown to 27 as of June 2020.

The Verkhovna Rada of Ukraine (Note: Ukrainian: Верховна Рада України (ВРУ), romanized: Verchovna Rada Ukraïny (VRU), IPA: [ʋerˈxɔu̯nɐ ˈrɑdɐ ʊkrɐˈjinɪ]; lit. 'Supreme Council of Ukraine'.; Also known as Verkhovna Rada (/vərˈkɒvnə ˈrɑːdə/ vər-KOV-nə RAH-də; VR) or simply Rada.) is the unicameral parliament of Ukraine. It consists of 450 deputies presided over by a speaker. The Verkhovna Rada meets in the Verkhovna Rada building in Ukraine's capital, Kyiv.

The Verkhovna Rada developed out of the systems of the republican representative body known in the Soviet Union as the Supreme Soviet (Supreme Council), which was first established on 26 June 1938 as a type of legislature of the Ukrainian SSR after the dissolution of the Congress of Soviets of the Ukrainian SSR.

The 12th convocation of the Supreme Soviet of the Ukrainian Soviet Socialist Republic (elected in 1990) issued the Declaration of Independence of Ukraine, introduced elements of a market economy and political liberalization, and officially changed the numeration of its sessions, proclaiming itself the first convocation of the "Verkhovna Rada of Ukraine". The current parliament is the ninth convocation. Because of the war in Donbas and Russia's unilateral occupation and annexation of Crimea, elections for the constituencies situated in Donbas and Crimea were not held in the 2014 and 2019 elections; hence the current composition of the Verkhovna Rada consists of 424 deputies.

The Verkhovna Rada previously used a mixed voting system, in which 50% of the seats were distributed under party-list proportional representation with 5% election threshold and the other 50% through first-past-the-post voting in single-member constituencies. The 50/50 mixed elections method was used in the 2002, 2012, 2014, and 2019 elections; however, in 2006 and 2007, the elections were held under a proportional system only. According to the election law that became valid on 1 January 2020, the next election to the Verkhovna Rada, expected to be held after the Russian invasion of Ukraine ends, will be held under a proportional system.

== Name ==
The name Rada (Ukrainian: Рада) means "council". The institution originated in the time of Kievan Rus' and then represented a council of boyars and of the higher clergy. In the 17th and 18th centuries, the Zaporozhian Cossacks used the term to refer to the meetings where major decisions were made; the Cossacks elected new councils by popular vote. The Ukrainian People's Republic, between 17 March 1917 and 29 April 1918, had a Central Rada. The West Ukrainian People's Republic and the Ukrainian government-in-exile each had a UNRada (Ukrainian National Rada).

The current name of the parliament derives from the Soviet practice of referring to the national parliament and parliaments of its constituent republics' Supreme Soviets (Russian: Верховный совет, romanized: Verkhovnyy soviet). Like in many other Soviet republics, Verkhovna Rada is a localized version of this term used in the Ukrainian SSR. After Ukraine regained independence in 1991, the term Verkhovnaya Rada (Russian: Верховная Рада) had been in use in both Russian and Ukrainian-based russophone media as a loan translation of the Ukrainian term. Verkhovna, the feminine form of the adjective "верховний" meaning supreme, derives from the Ukrainian word "верх" meaning "top".

Another name, less commonly used, is the Parliament of Ukraine (Ukrainian: Парламент України).

== History ==
=== 1917–1990 ===
- Central Rada in 1917–18
- Ukrainian National Rada in 1918 (West Ukraine)
- Labour Congress of Ukraine in 1919 (along with West Ukrainian delegates)
- Rada of the Republic in 1921 (exiled in Tarnów, Poland)

The Supreme Soviet of the Ukrainian Soviet Socialist Republic replaced the All-Ukrainian Congress of Soviets and was a type of legislative authority of Soviet Ukraine according to the 1937 Constitution of the Ukrainian SSR. The All-Ukrainian Congress of Soviets had already been renamed the Supreme Council in 1927. The Congress of Soviets was initiated by its Central Executive Committee, which it elected and held accountable. The last chairman of the committee was Hryhoriy Petrovsky (also known as Grigoriy Petrovskiy in Russian transliteration).

The first elections to the Supreme Council of the Ukrainian SSR took place on 26 June 1938. The first session of the parliament took place in Kyiv from 25 July to 28 July 1938. The first chairman of the council was Mykhailo Burmystenko, who later died during World War II. In 1938, a Presidium was elected by the council that was chaired by Leonid Korniyets. The Presidium represented the council whenever it was not in session.

During the war, the Presidium was evacuated to the city of Saratov in the Russian Soviet Federative Socialist Republic. On 29 June 1943, the Presidium issued an order postponing elections for the new convocation for one year while extending the first convocation. On 8 January 1944, the Council of Ministers of the Ukrainian SSR, in agreement with the Communist Party, decided to relocate the Presidium of the Supreme Council from Kharkiv to Kyiv. New elections were scheduled for 9 February 1947 for the Council.

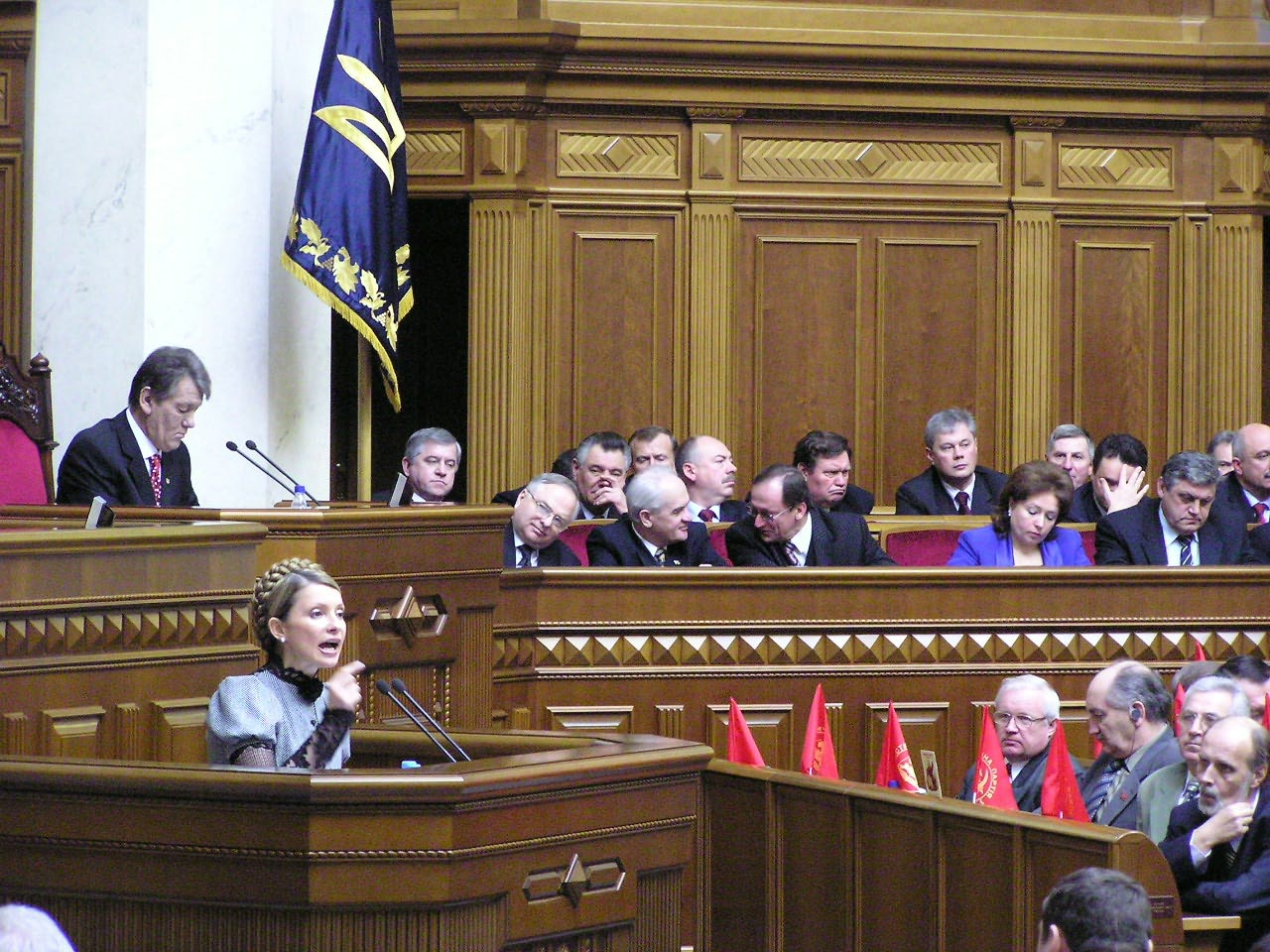
Yulia Tymoshenko was appointed Prime Minister of Ukraine in the Rada on 4 February 2005.

=== 1990–present ===
Until 24 August 1991, the Verkhovna Rada kept the name Supreme Soviet of the Ukrainian SSR.

The first partially free elections to the Verkhovna Rada and local councils of people's deputies were held on 4 March 1990. Although the Communist Party still remained in control, a "Democratic Bloc" was formed by numerous parties, including the People's Movement of Ukraine (Rukh), Helsinki Watch Committee of Ukraine, Party of Greens of Ukraine, and many others.

The twelfth convocation of the Supreme Council of the Ukrainian SSR issued the Declaration of State Sovereignty of Ukraine on 16 July 1990, and declared Ukrainian independence on 24 August 1991, at approximately 6 p.m. local time. At the time, the Chairman of the Verkhovna Rada was Leonid Kravchuk. The Act of Ukrainian Independence was overwhelmingly supported in a national referendum held on 1 December 1991. On 12 September 1991, the parliament adopted the law "On the Legal Succession of Ukraine". Thus, the VR became the Supreme Council of Ukraine.

The Constitution of Ukraine was adopted by the thirteenth convocation of the Verkhovna Rada on 28 June 1996, at approximately 9 a.m. local time. The parliament's fourteenth convocation officially changed the numbering of the convocations, proclaiming itself the third (democratic and independent) convocation of the Verkhovna Rada. After the Orange Revolution, constitutional amendments were adopted in December 2004, by the fourth (fifteenth) convocation of the Verkhovna Rada. On 1 October 2010, the Constitutional Court of Ukraine overturned the 2004 Amendments, considering them unconstitutional. On 21 February 2014, parliament reinstated the December 2004 amendments to the constitution.

In 2017 and 2018, the website of the Verkhovna Rada was the most popular among all websites of the parliaments of UN member states.

In 2025, the Rada resumed live broadcasts of parliamentary sessions following a three-year ban it imposed due to security reasons following the 2022 Russian invasion of Ukraine.

== Location ==
Full view of building

Front entrance

Side street perspective

The Verkhovna Rada meets in a neo-classical building within Constitution Square on Mykhaila Hrushevsky Street, Kyiv. The building adjoins Mariinskyi Park and the 18th-century Mariinskyi Palace, the official residence of the President of Ukraine.

After the transfer of the capital of the Ukrainian SSR from Kharkiv to Kyiv in 1934, several government buildings were planned for the city. In 1936, a contest for the construction of the parliament building was won by architect Volodymyr Zabolotny.

The original building was constructed from 1936 to 1938. Destroyed in the Second World War, the building was reconstructed from 1945 to 1947. The rebuilt glass dome is one metre higher than the original.

=== Other locations ===
- Palace Ukraina, site of President Leonid Kuchma's inauguration
- Ukrainian House (21 January 2000)
- Building of budget committee (6–8 vulytsia Bankova on 4 April 2013)

== Mission and authority ==
The Verkhovna Rada is the sole body of legislative power in Ukraine. The parliament determines the principles of domestic and foreign policy, introduces amendments to the Constitution of Ukraine, adopts laws, approves the state budget, designates elections for the President of Ukraine, impeaches the president, declares war and peace, appoints the Prime Minister of Ukraine, appoints or confirms certain officials, appoints one-third of the Constitutional Court of Ukraine, ratifies and denounces international treaties, and exercises certain control functions. The constitution of Ukraine stipulates that the Verkhovna Rada is authorized to fulfill its functions under the condition that at least two-thirds of its constitutional composition (300 or more people's deputies) are elected.

In Ukraine there are no requirements for the minimum number of signatures (of deputies) to register a bill. In general the parliament adopts about 200 bills per year. An average of five to six bills are registered daily in parliament. As a result of this in the spring of 2019 parliament had more than 10 thousand registered and under consideration bills it had yet to debate.

All procedural regulations are contained in the Law on Regulations of the Verkhovna Rada of Ukraine. The latest version of the document was adopted on 16 December 2012, in which through the initiative of the President of Ukraine amendments were made concerning registration and voting by parliamentarians. 2012 became a year of numerous changes in regards to the document, among which were changes to the election of the chairman. Bills are usually considered following the procedure of three readings; the President of Ukraine must sign a law before it can be officially promulgated.

Until 2017 the parliament appointed and dismissed judges from their posts and permitted detention or arrest of judges (those powers were transferred to the High Council of Justice).

== Composition ==
Government (229) Supported by (75) Opposition (69) Independents (19) Vacant (60)

The Verkhovna Rada is a unicameral legislature with 450 people's deputies (Ukrainian: народний депутат) elected on the basis of equal and direct universal suffrage through a secret ballot.

=== Parliamentary factions, groups, and parties ===
All members of parliament are grouped into parliamentary factions and groups. Members of parliament who were elected from a certain party list are not necessarily members of that party. Parties that break the 5% electoral threshold form factions in the parliament. The formation of official parliamentary factions is regulated by the Verkhovna Rada's rules and procedures.

Only 15 or more deputies may form a parliamentary faction and an MP may be a member of only one faction at a time. The chairman and his two vice-chairmen may not be the heads of factions. Under current parliamentary rules a faction of non-partisan politicians can not be smaller than the smallest faction of a political party.

Deputies who are expelled from factions or decide to leave them to become individual lawmakers; individual deputies are allowed to unite into parliamentary groups of people's deputies that again have at least 15 deputies. Several influential parties have been founded after originally being formed as a faction in the Verkhovna Rada, for example, the Party of Regions, All-Ukrainian Union "Fatherland" and Labour Ukraine.

Each parliamentary faction or group appoints a leader.

Since the Imperative mandate provisions of the Ukrainian constitution came into effect again in February 2014 a political party can withdraw a parliamentary mandate if one of their MPs leaves its parliamentary faction. MPs who defected from one faction to another were derided as "tushky" (carcass). The insult was applied to MPs allegedly bribed to switch factions.

Parliament is primarily male. Women accounted for 8.5% of MPs in 2010, 10% after the 2012 parliamentary election and 11.1% after the 2014 parliamentary election, the highest in history. Conversely, female representation in national legislatures within the EU was 25% as of 2014. Female representation rose considerably after the 2019 elections, achieving a 21% female Rada.

On 20 March 2022, the activities of the main opposition party, Opposition Platform — For Life were suspended by the National Security and Defense Council for the period of martial law due to allegations of having ties to Russia made by the Council during the Russian invasion of Ukraine.

==== Biggest parliamentary factions ====
- 1990–1994 Communist Party of Ukraine (After the failed 1991 August Putsch in Moscow it was simply called as Group of 239)
- 1994–2002 Communist Party of Ukraine
- 2002–2006 Viktor Yushchenko Bloc "Our Ukraine"
- 2006–2014 Party of Regions
- 2014 All-Ukrainian Union "Fatherland"
- 2014–2019 Petro Poroshenko Bloc "Solidarity"
- 2019–present Servant of the People

=== Historical composition ===
Comm. (CPSU) / Comm. / Soc. / Prog. Soc. / Soc. Dem. (u) / Soc. Peas. / Peas. / Ag. / PDP / Green / Hrom. / Dem. Bloc / Move-ment / Rep. / Nat. / Others / Indep.
1990	331 / 111
1994	86 / 14 / 19 / 168 / 20 / 8 / 5 / 18
1998	121 / 16 / 17 / 34 / 9 / 28 / 19 / 111 / 24 / 46 / 8 / 15

Comm. / Soc. / Soc. Dem. (u) / Regions / Lytvyn Bloc / United Ukr. / Tym. Bloc / Batkiv. / Our Ukr. / UDAR / Svoboda / Others / Indep.
2002	64 / 23 / 24 / 101 / 94 / 22 / 113 / 9
2006	21 / 33 / 186 / 129 / 81
2007	27 / 175 / 20 / 156 / 72
2012	32 / 185 / 43 / 101 / 40 / 37 / 7

Radical / Opp. Bloc / Opp. Bloc (2019) / For Life / Batkiv. / Servant of the People / Self Reliance / People's Front / Holos / Por. Bloc / Euro. Sol. / Svoboda / Others / Indep.
2014	22 / 29 / 97 / 20 / 33 / 82 / 131 / 6 / 3
2019	43 / 6 / 46 / 26 / 254 / 20 / 25 / 4

=== Members of Parliament ===
Members of the Verkhovna Rada are known officially as "People's Deputies of Ukraine" (PDs). According to the "Law on elections of national deputies of Ukraine", a citizen of Ukraine may become a People's Deputy if he or she has, on the day of the election, a) reached 21 years of age; b) political franchise; c) resided in Ukraine for the last five years.

Deputies have the right to free transportation, free use of the hall of official delegations, free housing, free medical services and free vacations at health spas. Each deputy is allowed to have up to 31 assistant-consultants, four of which may be admitted into the Secretariat of the Verkhovna Rada. Until 2019, the Ukrainian President, Prime Minister, members of the government and deputies all had parliamentary immunity and agents of law enforcement were prohibited from searching their homes or following them. During the Orange Revolution and the campaign for the 2007 parliamentary election Party of Regions, OU-PSD and BYuT all promised to strip lawmakers of parliamentary immunity. In June 2008 the parliament failed to adopt the Bill on restriction of privileges for deputies and introduction of imperative mandate. 192 of 436 PDs registered in the plenary hall voted in favor of the bill. The factions of the opposition Party of Regions, as well as the CPU and the Lytvyn Bloc, voted against it. The OU-PSD faction voted partially in favor, while the bill's sponsor, the BYUT, voted unanimously. A proposal to send the bill for first reading a second time also failed. In May 2009 the second Tymoshenko Government approved a bill amending the Law on the status of a people's deputy of Ukraine, which reduced the privileges of incumbent and former deputies. The parliament canceled some benefits and payments to lawmakers in December 2011.

A PD's absence from the Rada may be punished by withholding their salary.

In December 2019, PDs lost most aspects of parliamentary immunity, with the exception of statements and votes conducted in parliament or its bodies .

Several local millionaires have been members of the Rada.

In early 2020, the Servant of the People party announced plans to reduce the number of deputies from 450 to 300. A vote garnered 236 votes in favor, 40 against, and 86 abstentions.

==== Oath of office ====
Before assuming office, deputies must take the following oath before the leadership of the Rada and fellow deputies on the first day of a new session of the Rada.

In the original Ukrainian:

Присягаю на вірність Україні. Зобов'язуюсь усіма своїми діями боронити суверенітет і незалежність України, дбати про благо Вітчизни і добробут Українського народу.
Присягаю додержуватися Конституції України та законів України, виконувати свої обов'язки в інтересах усіх співвітчизників.

English translation:

I swear allegiance to Ukraine. I commit myself with all my deeds to protect the sovereignty and independence of Ukraine, to provide for the good of the Motherland and for the welfare of the Ukrainian people.
I swear to abide by the Constitution of Ukraine and the laws of Ukraine, to carry out my duties in the interests of all compatriots.

== Other offices ==
=== Chairman and deputy chairmen ===
The Verkhovna Rada elects from among its ranks a Chairman (Speaker; Ukrainian: Голова Верховної Ради), a First Deputy Chairman, and a Second Deputy Chairman.

Before the Chairman of a newly convoked Rada is elected, parliamentary sessions are presided over by members of a temporary presidium of the first session (Ukrainian: тимчасова президія першої сесії). The temporary presidium is composed of five deputies, representing the four largest parliamentary factions plus the chairman of a preparatory deputy group of the first parliamentary session. However, the Rada may deviate from this composition.

Chairman duties include presiding over parliamentary sessions, signing bills and parliamentary acts before sending them to the President for promulgation, and organising staff work. The chairman is empowered to call special sessions of parliament, enact bills vetoed by the President should the Rada vote to overturn the veto by a two-thirds majority, and participate in meetings of the National Security and Defence Council.

Should the office of President of Ukraine become vacant, the chairman becomes the acting head of state, though with limited authority. As head of state, the chairman may dissolve parliament, appoint candidates to critical posts or submit such candidates for parliamentary approval, grant military ranks, create state orders, and exercise the right of pardon. There are no codified constitutional or legal instructions for succession if there is simultaneously no President or chairman.

=== Presidium ===
The Presidium of the Verkhovna Rada is a collective name adapted for the chairman and their deputies out of tradition. Before the collapse of the Soviet Union, it was an official office elected at the first session of each convocation of the Supreme Soviet. Originally it consisted of a chairman, their two deputies, a secretary, and 19 additional members. The Presidium was regulated by Section 106 of the 1978 Constitution of the Ukrainian SSR, which granted Presidium almost all of the Rada's powers wherever the latter was not in session, on the condition that any decrees be laid at the next parliamentary session for approval. Since the adoption of the Ukrainian Constitution, the Presidium has been abolished. However, Rada leadership including the current chairman, their deputies and potentially faction leaders are sometimes called the Presidium.

Article 18 of the Regulations of the Verkhovna Rada require the first session of every newly elected parliament be headed by a temporary presidium of six MPs.

=== Ceremonial opening and the first session of new convocation ===
The first session of each newly elected parliament is highly important. A "Preparation" deputy group is tasked with planning the first session, with support from the Rada's Office. The Preparation group is composed of newly elected PDs under the authority of the previous session's chairman or their personal deputies. This is required by Article 13 of the Regulations. The Preparation group elects its own chairperson, the chairperson's deputies deputy and a secretary. The group is also responsible for establishing committees.

Before the opening of the first session, all newly elected PDs gather for the oath ceremony. This is required by Article 14 of the Regulations. Invitations to take the oath are given by the chairman of the previous convocation. The chairman grants the leading word to the oldest PD, and asks PDs stand and recite the oath aloud. PDs sign a copy of the oath as well, which is then stored in the Rada's archives.

Plenary meetings of the first session review the following matters: formation of the provisional presidium, establishment and registration of the factions, pending legislation and the elections of the Counting Commission, the chairman, and the chairman's deputies. They also conduct hearings on extraordinary messages on domestic and foreign affairs from the President, hearings regarding the Preparation group report and parliamentary committees. They also address the Conciliation board of deputy factions in the media coverage of Rada activities and sessions.

=== Office of the Verkhovna Rada ===
Logo of the Verkhovna Rada used before 2020

The Office of the Verkhovna Rada is a support department providing organizational, legal, social, analytical and other assistance to parliament, other departments with parliament, and PDs. The Office is officially non-partisan, existing mainly to provide secretarial help.

Before the first session of each new parliament, the Office provides PDs various documents, including the Constitution of Ukraine, the Regulations of the Verkhovna Rada, election results from the Central Election Commission, the Law of Ukraine on the Status of People's Deputies, and others. This is required by Article 12 of the Regulations.

=== Office of the Ombudsman ===
The Office of the Ombudsman was established in 1998 and led by Nina Karpachova until 2012. The Office of the Ombudsman has its own secretariat and advisory council. The current Ombudsman is Lyudmyla Denisova, who replaced Valeriya Lutkovska in 2017.

=== Committees ===
The Rada establishes parliamentary committees. On 4 December 2014, parliament formed 27 committees and 2 special control commissions. The previous parliament (2012–2014) had 29 committees and an ad hoc supervisory board. The sixth session of the Rada (2007–2012) had 28 committees, including the Budget Committee, the Special Control Commission of the Verkhovna Rada on Privatization, and the Committee on Transportation and Communications. There are no permanent or standing committees, though committees from previous convocations may be re-formed. Among the most important is the Budget Committee.

=== Investigative commissions ===
PDs may create temporary investigative commissions. Creating such a commission requires one-third of the constitutionally enumerated seats (i.e. 150/450 members). Before a bill for creating such a commission may be schedule for voting, it must be approved by the Committee on Regulations.

=== Mass media ===
- Holos Ukrainy
- Rada TV

== Incidents in parliament ==
=== Fights and incidents ===
Brawls are not unusual in the Rada. On several occasions work in parliament is blocked by sit-ins by various parties (usually for a couple of days; but in 2008 from 18 January till 6 March and in February 2013 for 17 days). In 2000 and on 4 April 2013 the parliament split into two and held two sessions on two different premises.

A noticeable incident was the disorder of 27 April 2010, after the parliament ratified a treaty that extended the Russian Black Sea Fleet lease in the Crimean port of Sevastopol until 2042, when Chairman Volodymyr Lytvyn had to be shielded with umbrellas as he was pelted with eggs, while smoke bombs exploded and politicians brawled. Another major incident occurred on 16 December 2010 when several Rada members were admitted to hospital after Party of Regions politicians stormed the parliament podium, which was occupied by the Bloc Yulia Tymoshenko faction.

On 12 December 2012, an all-out scuffle broke out in Parliament, as Batkivshchyna party members attempted to prevent the swearing in of two members who had left the party during the body's first session following the October 2012 election. The same day members of the All-Ukrainian Union "Svoboda" removed the fence around the Verkhovna Rada that was installed early October 2012. The speaker of the parliament Volodymyr Rybak promised to review the incident of the fence removal. The fence is not accounted as the property of parliament nor the city of Kyiv. Rybak noted that the matter might require a review within a special designated committee.

From the parliamentary election of 28 October 2012 till the first months of 2013 parliamentary work was virtually paralyzed because the opposition (UDAR, Fatherland, Svoboda, others) blocked the podium and chairman's seat on various days.

== International relations ==
- Inter-Parliamentary Union (Geneva)
- Parliamentary dimension of the Central European Initiative (Trieste)
- Parliamentary Assembly of the Organization for Security and Co-operation in Europe (PA OSCE, Copenhagen)
- European Parliament (Brussels)
- Euronest Parliamentary Assembly (Brussels)
- NATO Parliamentary Assembly (NATO PA, Brussels)
- Interparliamentary Assembly of member nations of the Commonwealth of Independent States (Moscow)
- Interparliamentary Assembly of the Eurasian Economic Community (Saint Petersburg)
- GUAM Parliamentary Assembly (Kyiv)
- Interparliamentary Assembly on Orthodoxy (Athens)
- Parliamentary Assembly of the Organization of the Black Sea Economic Cooperation (PA BSEC, Istanbul)

=== Parliamentary Assembly of the Council of Europe ===
Ukraine was accepted as a full member of the Parliamentary Assembly of the Council of Europe (PACE) in 1995.

It is represented there by the parliamentary delegation of the Verkhovna Rada consisting of 12 representatives including a chairperson of the delegation, a vice-chairperson and their 12 substitutes; in total, 24 members. The Ukrainian delegation also has its own permanent secretariat of four members that assist in the inter-parliamentary relationships between the PACE and the Verkhovna Rada. For the full list of members, refer to the PACE main website at assembly.coe.int.

- 2002–2006 Borys Oliynyk (CPU), Anatoliy Rakhansky (LB)
- 2006–2007 Serhiy Holovaty (OU), Hryhoriy Nemyria (BYuT)
- 2007–2012 Ivan Popescu (PR), Olha Herasymiyuk (OU)
- 2012–present Ivan Popescu (PR), Serhiy Sobolyev (Ba)

== Elections ==
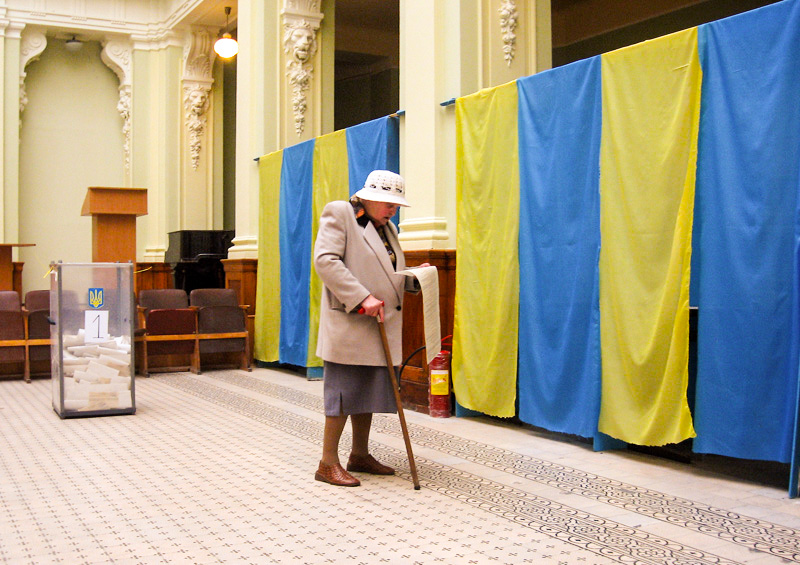
A woman with the ballot during the 2007 Ukrainian parliamentary election

The parliamentary electoral system has repeatedly changed. Each convocation of the Rada has been elected under different sets of laws which have evolved from the purely majoritarian system of the Soviet era to the purely proportional scheme effective from 2006 until 2010. The next election will be held under such a proportional scheme.

In the 1990 and 1994 elections, all 450 MPs were elected in single-member districts. Ukraine was therefore divided into 450 electoral districts, each contributing one MP. To win a seat, a candidate needed more than 50% of the votes. If no candidate had 50%, then the two leading candidates participated in a run-off vote.

In the 1998 and 2002 elections, 225 MPs were elected in single-member districts as earlier (with the exception that the candidate needed only a simple majority to win). The remaining 225 MPs were elected on a proportional basis. These seats were divided between parties who passed a 4% electoral threshold.

Unlike previous elections, the 2006 and 2007 elections were exclusively proportional; all 450 seats were determined through the proportional electoral system. Seats were divided between parties who passed a 3% electoral threshold. For the 2007 election, the threshold percentage was not changed, but some amendments to the election process were made. In the 2012, 2014 and 2019 elections a mixed voting system was again used (50% under party lists and 50% under simple-majority constituencies) with a 5% election threshold.

Ordinarily, elections would have occurred in 2023. The imposition of martial law in response to the Russian invasion of Ukraine has indefinitely postponed elections, as the Ukrainian constitution prohibits holding elections while under martial law. The newest version of the electoral code, which took effect on 1 January 2020, specifies the next election will have no single-member constituencies. Instead, MPs will only be elected on a party list in one nationwide constituency with a 5% election threshold with open regional lists of candidates.

=== Latest election ===
Party	Proportional			Constituency			Total seats	+/–
Party	Votes	%	Seats	Votes	%	Seats	Total seats	+/–
Servant of the People	6,307,793	43.16	124	4,630,880	32.87	130	254	New
Opposition Platform — For Life	1,908,111	13.06	37	987,832	7.01	6	43	New
Batkivshchyna	1,196,303	8.19	24	686,734	4.87	2	26	+6
European Solidarity	1,184,620	8.11	23	589,918	4.19	2	25	–106
Holos	851,722	5.83	17	401,903	2.85	3	20	New
Radical Party of Oleh Liashko	586,384	4.01	0	152,191	1.08	0	0	–22
Strength and Honor	558,652	3.82	0	175,397	1.24	0	0	0
Opposition Bloc — Party for Peace and Development	443,195	3.03	0	377,191	2.68	6	6	New
Ukrainian Strategy of Groysman	352,934	2.42	0				0	New
Party of Shariy	327,152	2.24	0	12,054	0.09	0	0	New
Svoboda	315,568	2.16	0	452,373	3.21	1	1	–6
Civil Position	153,225	1.05	0	103,044	0.73	0	0	0
Party of Greens of Ukraine	96,659	0.66	0				0	0
Self Reliance	91,596	0.63	0	135,297	0.96	1	1	–32
Agrarian Party of Ukraine	75,509	0.52	0	96,139	0.68	0	0	New
Movement of New Forces	67,740	0.46	0	7,683	0.05	0	0	New
Power of the People	27,984	0.19	0	49,117	0.35	0	0	0
Power of Law	20,340	0.14	0				0	New
Patriot	16,123	0.11	0	18,015	0.13	0	0	New
Social Justice	15,967	0.11	0	2,615	0.02	0	0	New
Independence	7,970	0.05	0				0	New
Torch	7,739	0.05	0				0	New
United Centre				44,485	0.32	1	1	New
People's Movement of Ukraine				41,482	0.29	0	0	0
Ukrainian Democratic Alliance for Reform				22,279	0.16	0	0	–
Bila Tserkva Together				20,277	0.14	1	1	New
Democratic Axis				13,613	0.10	0	0	New
Civil Movement of Ukraine				12,037	0.09	0	0	0
Joint Action				7,071	0.05	0	0	0
Ukrainian Unity Party				6,355	0.05	0	0	New
Congress of Ukrainian Nationalists				5,318	0.04	0	0	0
Right Sector				5,093	0.04	0	0	–1
Our Land				4,709	0.03	0	0	New
All-Ukrainian Union "Cherkashchany"				4,283	0.03	0	0	New
Social and Political Platform of Nadiya Savchenko				3,949	0.03	0	0	New
Party of Free Democrats				3,599	0.03	0	0	New
Ukrainian Party				3,268	0.02	0	0	New
Party of Pensioners of Ukraine				3,262	0.02	0	0	0
Ukraine the Glorious				3,064	0.02	0	0	0
Native City				2,376	0.02	0	0	0
Socialist Party of Ukraine				1,990	0.01	0	0	0
Liberty				1,802	0.01	0	0	0
Community and Law				1,527	0.01	0	0	New
Darth Vader Bloc				1,164	0.01	0	0	New
Development				903	0.01	0	0	New
Republican Christian Party				902	0.01	0	0	New
Aware Nation				766	0.01	0	0	New
Real Action				764	0.01	0	0	New
Party of Local Self-Governance				520	0.00	0	0	New
Meritocratic Party of Ukraine				517	0.00	0	0	0
Trust the Deeds				428	0.00	0	0	New
Gypsy Party of Ukraine				388	0.00	0	0	New
Internet Party of Ukraine				370	0.00	0	0	0
Bdzhola				222	0.00	0	0	New
People's Truth				206	0.00	0	0	New
Student Party of Ukraine				138	0.00	0	0	New
Pirate Party of Ukraine				133	0.00	0	0	New
Independents				4,992,514	35.43	46	46	–51
Vacant						26	26	–
Total	14,613,286	100.00	225	14,090,157	100.00	225	450	0
Valid votes	14,613,286	99.01						
Invalid/blank votes	146,262	0.99						
Total votes	14,759,548	100.00						
Registered voters/turnout	29,973,739	49.24						
Source: CLEA, CVK

== See also ==
- Central Council of Ukraine, All-Ukrainian Congress of Soviets, Central Executive Committee of Ukraine
- Rada TV, the official TV channel of the Verkhovna Rada
- Supreme Soviet of the Soviet Union
- Ukrainian Center for EU Civil Service Standards, public institution established to facilitate administrative reform to European Union standards.
