= Mayor of Sevastopol =

Political post

The Mayor of Sevastopol (Russian: Главы Севастополя, romanized: Glavy Sevastopolya; Ukrainian: Міські голови Севастополя, romanized: Miski holovy Sevastopolia) usually refers to the highest-ranking official that governs the city of Sevastopol. The following is a list of mayors or governors of the city since the early 19th century under various governments.

== Russian Empire (1802-1917) ==
=== Military Government (1802—1872) ===
Portrait	Name	Years in office	References
	Jean Baptiste, marquis de Traversay	1802 — 1811	
	Roman Gall	1811	
	Nikolai Yazykov	1811 – 1816	
	Aleksey Greig	1816 – 1829	
	Andrei Turchaninov	1829 – 1830	
	Nosov	1830	
	Nikolai Stolypin	1830	
	Andrei Turchaninov	1830	
	Aleksey Greig	1830 – 1833	
	Mikhail Lazarev	1833 – 1851	
	Maurice Berg	1851 – 1852	
	Mykhail Stanyukovich	1852 – 1854	
	Vladimir Kornilov	1852 – 1854	
	Pavel Nakhimov	1854 – 1855	
	Fyodor Novosilsky	1855	
	Nikolai Metlin	1855 – 1856	
	Alexander Panfilov	1856	
	Grigory Butakov	1856 – 1857	
	Feodosiy Bartenev	1857 – 1858	
	Pyotor Kislinskiy	1858 – 1865	

=== Civilian Government (1872—1917) ===
Portrait	Name	Years in Office
	Pavel Pereleshin	1872 – 1873
	Mikhail Kazy	1873 – 1876
	Andrei Nikonov	1876 – 1882
	Ivan Rudnev	1882 – 1885
	Mikhail Kurmany	1885 – 1891
	Ivan Lavrov	1891 – 1896
	Constantine Valrond	1896 – 1899
	Yevgeny Feodosyev	1899 – 1902
	Nikolai Khvostov	1902
	Alexander Spitsky	1902 – 1905
	Yevgeny Rogulya	1905 – 1906
	Vladimir von Mohrenschildt	1906 – 1909
	Sergei Kuhlström	1909 – 1913
	Sergey Burley	1913 – 1917

== Russian Civil War (1917-1920) ==
Portrait	Name	Years in office	Aligned government
	Sergey Nikonov	March – July 1917	Russian Provisional Government
	Nadezhda Ostrovskaya	July – October 1917	Soviet Russia
	Yuriy Gaven	December 1917 – April 1918	Soviet Russia
	Nikolai Pozharov	1918	Soviet Russia
	Vladimir Subbotin	September 1919 – February 1920	Russian State
	Vladimir Sidorin	April – May 1920	Russian State
	Aleksei Baranov	1920	Soviet Russia

== Soviet Russia/Union (1920—1942) ==
Portrait	Name	Years in office
	Semyon Krylov	1920 – 1921
	Kharchenko	193? — 1937
	Vasiliy Yefremov	1938 – 1942

== Nazi German occupation (1942—1943) ==
Portrait	Name	Years in office
	Nikolai Madatov	July – August 1942
	P. Supryagin	August 1942 – 1943

== Soviet Union (1944—1991) ==
=== Soviet Russia (1944—1954) ===
Name	Years in office
Vasiliy Yefremov	1944 – 1946
Pavel Levin	1947 – 1948
V. Filippov	1948 – 1949
Serhiy Sosnytskyi	1951 – 1954

=== Soviet Ukraine (1954—1991) ===
Name	Years in office
Serhiy Sosnytskyi	1954 – 1957
Sergei Kysanov	1957 – 1963
Pavel Stenkovoy	1963 – 1973
Ivan Kyrylenko	1976 – 1979
Yegeniy Generalov	1979 – 1989

== Independent Ukraine (1991—2014) ==
Name	Years in office
Arkadiy Shestakov	1990 – 1991
Ivan Yermakov	1991 – 1994
Mykola Hlushko (acting)	1994 – 1995
Viktor Semenov	1995 – 1998
Borys Kucher	1998 - 1999
Leonid Zhunko	1999 – 2005
Serhiy Ivanov	2005 – 2006
Serhiy Kunitsyn	2006 – 2010
Valeriy Saratov	2010 - 2011
Volodymyr Yatsuba	2011 - 2014
Fedir Rubanov (acting)	2014

== Russian occupation (2014—present) ==
Portrait	Name	Years in office	Notes
	Alexey Chaly	March – April 2014	
	Sergey Menyaylo	2014 – 2016	
	Dmitry Ovsyannikov	2016 – 2019	
	Mikhail Razvozhayev	2019 – present	
