= Sevastopol City State Administration =

Head of the executive branch in Sevastopol, Crimea

Chairperson of the Sevastopol City State Administration
- Residence: Sevastopol
- Formation: 1992 as the Presidential representative of Ukraine in Sevastopol
- First holder: Ivan Yermakov
- Final holder: Volodymyr Yatsuba

The chairperson of the Sevastopol City State Administration (Ukrainian: голова Севастопольської міськдержадміністрації, romanized: holova Sevastopolskoyi miskoyi derzhavnoyi administratsiyi) is the head of the executive branch of Sevastopol city. Informally, it is referred to as governor of Sevastopol.

In Ukraine, the office is an appointed position, with officeholders being appointed by the president on recommendation from the prime minister. According to the Ukrainian Constitution, the chairperson should resign after a new president is elected. Since the 2014 Russian aggression against Ukraine and Russian occupation of Sevastopol, Ukrainian authorities have been unable to appoint a new chairperson.

The official residence is located in Sevastopol.

The post was first created in 1992 as the presidential representative in Sevastopol with Ivan Yermakov appointed as the first officeholder. Yermakov previously headed the city's council and its executive committee. The post of Sevastopol city governor historically existed in the city during the Russian Empire from 1872 to 1920. During the Soviet period, the city was governed by the First Secretary of the city's committee of the Communist Party, which was dissolved in Ukraine due to the 1991 August putsch. After the 2014 Crimean crisis and annexation of Crimea, the post was abolished by Sevastopol's facto Russian authorities. The last appointed head of the Sevastopol City State Administration was Volodymyr Yatsuba, who resigned in 2014.

== Governors ==
=== Executive committee chairperson ===
- 1954–1957: Serhiy Sosnytskyi
- 1957–1963: unknown
- 1963–1973: Pavlo Stenkovyi
- 1973–1979: Ivan Kyrylenko
- 1979–1989: Yevgeniy Generalov
- 1990–1991: Arkadiy Shestakov
- 1991–1992: Ivan Yermakov

=== Presidential representative ===
- 1992–1994: Ivan Yermakov
- 1994: Mykola Hlushko (acting January–April)
- 1994–1995: vacant

=== Administration chairperson ===
- 1995–1998: Viktor Semenov
- 1998–1999: Borys Kucher
- 1999–2005: Leonid Zhunko
- 2005–2006: Serhiy Ivanov
- 2006–2010: Serhiy Kunitsyn
- 2010–2011: Valeriy Saratov
- 2011–2014: Volodymyr Yatsuba
- 2014: Fedir Rubanov

== See also ==
- Sevastopol City Committee of the Communist Party of Ukraine
- Governor of Sevastopol (Russia)
