= Coat of arms of Sevastopol =

Versions

- Flag of Sevastopol
- Armiger: Governor of Sevastopol
- Adopted: 12 February 1969
- Relinquished: 3 July 2019
- Crest: Banner reading Севастополь
- Shield: Party per bend argent and azure; on a Gold star in second quarter and the Monument to the Sunken Ships argent in third quarter and a laurel branch in-bend or in fourth quarter, a bordure or.
- Supporter: Ribbon of the Order of Saint Andrew

The coat of arms of Sevastopol (Note: Russian: Герб Севастополя; Ukrainian: Герб Севастополя; Crimean Tatar: Акъйарнынъ тугърасы, romanized: Aqyarnıñ tuğrası) is a heraldic symbol representing the city of Sevastopol, Crimea. (Note: The status of Crimea and of the city of Sevastopol is since March 2014 under dispute between Russia and Ukraine; Ukraine and the majority of the international community consider Crimea to be an autonomous republic of Ukraine and Sevastopol to be one of Ukraine's cities with special status, whereas Russia considers Crimea to be a federal subject of Russia and Sevastopol to be one of Russia's three federal cities.) It is featured in the middle of the flag of Sevastopol on a red background.

From 21 July 1893, until the October Revolution in 1917, Sevastopol, under the Russian Empire, used a royal coat of arms, which featured the monograms of Tsars Nicholas I and Alexander II. The royal coat of arms was disposed by the Soviet Union, and the city went without an official coat of arms until 1969. On 12 February 1969, city council approved a new design containing the Gold Star medal and a silhouette of the Monument to the Sunken Ships.

Following the independence of Ukraine, the Representative of the President of Ukraine in Sevastopol, Ivan Fedosovich Yermakov began a review of the previous coat of arms in 1992. A jury decided to return to the royal coat of arms used in the 19th century. A legal technicality, where the decision by the city council to approve the previous coat of arms went unreverted, resulted in the city having two official coat of arms until 2000. On 21 April 2000, Sevastopol City Council passed resolution number 518 titled "О гербе города-героя Севастополя" (On the coat of arms of the Hero City of Sevastopol), which legitimized the Soviet-era design as the city's only official coat of arms.

As a result of the 2014 Russian annexation of Crimea, the city no longer had an official coat of arms. Since then, several attempts were made to reconfirm either of the previous designs, but to no avail. On 1 November 2018, Governor Dmitry Ovsyannikov made a decree allowing the Soviet-era design to be used as the city's coat of arms until the Legislative Assembly of Sevastopol approves a design. The Soviet-era design, although popular with residents, has been struck down by the Legislative Assembly on 3 July 2019, due to the criticisms on its design by the Heraldic Council of the President of the Russian Federation.

== History ==
=== 19th century ===
The royal coat of arms approved for use in 1893 featuring the monograms of Nicholas I (left) and Alexander II (right)

In the 1800s, the citizens of Sevastopol created their own coat of arms (pictured) and used it unofficially until a submission of the emblem was presented to city council in 1892. The council approved the design in 1893, and on 21 July 1893, the Russian Empire's department of Heroldia approved the emblem to be used as the city's official coat of arms.

==== Design ====
The escutcheon is a square top with a "French" base. The canton features the coat of arms for the Taurida Governorate. The rest of the shield depicts an argent griffin on a gules field. The crest contains another sable double-headed eagle with two imperial crowns and one enlarged between the two heads, representative of the Russian Empire—the crowns are tied together with the ribbon of the Order of Saint Andrew. The eagle sits on top of an or crown of the city's mayor. The Ribbon of Saint George surrounds the shield, entangling two diagonally crossed anchors, symbolizing the port city, and two flag poles. The flag poles contain gules banners featuring the monograms of Tsars Nicholas I (left) and Alexander II (right) enclosed by the chain of the Order of Saint Andrew.

=== 20th century ===
As a result of the October Revolution in 1917, Sevastopol lost its royal coat of arms. The city went fifty-two years without an official coat of arms until a design contest was held for a new emblem. Council approved the Soviet-era design on 12 February 1969, submitted by Sergei Shakhunov and Nadezhda Krylova.

In October 1992, the Representative of the President of Ukraine in Sevastopol, Ivan Fedosovich Yermakov started a review of the city's coat of arms. The jury reverted to the royal emblem without reverting the previous approval, thus the city had two official coats of arms until 2000.

On 21 May 1997, Ukraine passed the law regarding local self-government. Article 22 dictated that villages, towns, and cities may have their own symbols, flags, and coat of arms reflecting their own historical traditions and cultures as determined by local council.

On 21 April 2000, Sevastopol City Council passed resolution number 518 titled "О гербе города-героя Севастополя" (On the coat of arms of the Hero City of Sevastopol), which made the Soviet-era design the official and only coat of arms of the city.

==== Design ====
The escutcheon shape features a square top with a "French" base. The field is divided party per bend, or diagonally from the upper left to the lower right, with an azure dexter base, which represents the sea, and an argent sinister chief, which represents the white stone of Inkerman. The azure corner features a silhouette of the Monument to the Sunken Ships, while the argent corner contains a Gold Star medal, symbolic of the victory during the Second World War. An or laurel branch stretches between the two partitions in the sinister base.

Alternatively, some versions of the coat of arms feature the ribbon of the Order of Saint Andrew and a banner with the Russian word for Sevastopol, Севастополь.

==== Usage ====
The coat of arms of Sevastopol is the primary feature of the flag of Sevastopol appearing in the centre of a red field. It is also shown on the fuselage of Ka-27 and Mi-8 helicopters in Russia's Black Sea Fleet.

=== 21st century ===
Following the annexation of Crimea by the Russian Federation in 2014, the city no longer had an official coat of arms. The Heraldic Council of the President of the Russian Federation approved the option to revert to the previous monarchical coat of arms with the addition of the Gold Star medal as the emblem's order.

On 6 February 2015, deputy Alexander Kovshar presented Bill No. 19/102 to the Legislative Assembly of Sevastopol, proposing that the city's official coat of arms be a variant of the monarchical version chosen in 1893, excluding the Tauridan coat of arms, and adding the Gold Star as its order. The bill sparked an uproar among residents because of the lack of consultation. An appeal was made in March 2015, to the government and was signed by numerous citizens and notable residents. The appeal demands that the Legislative Assembly immediately recall the bill, discuss the feasibility of implementing a brand new coat of arms, and have a Russian-wide competition to decide upon said new coat of arms. Vasily Parkhomenko, the Chairman of Sevastopol City Council when the resolution 518 was passed to approve the Soviet-era design, was among the signatories. The bill was recalled on 19 October 2015. Chairwoman of the Legislative Assembly, Yekaterina Altabaeva, announced that a referendum on the coat of arms was planned for March 18, alongside the 2018 Russian presidential election, however it was later cancelled due to time constraints.

On 25 May 2018, the City of Sevastopol unveiled an online poll asking residents which design they preferred to be the city's official coat of arms. 79% preferred the Soviet-era design, 18% favoured the Russian Empire-era design, while 3% wished for a brand new coat of arms.

On 8 June 2018, a bill was tabled to the Legislative Assembly, which would have legitimized the design chosen in 2000, as the city's official coat of arms. On 20 June 2018, the heraldic council objected to the proposal due to its violation of heraldic design principals. Infringements include the gold border, which indicates the city is of a lower status, contradictory of Sevastopol's city of federal importance status; the Gold Star, which is in the field instead of the shield's order or support; the image of the Monument to the Sunken Ships; the structure of the shield, which is interpreted as combining two emblems into one shield, contradictory of the city's history; and the imposition of the Gold Star and laurel branch on a silver background, which violates the Rule of tincture where a metal (or) may not be placed on another metal (argent). The Legislative Assembly, on 20 July, rejected the bill with ten votes in favour (one away from the eleven minimum required to pass); chairwoman Altabaeva cited the heraldic council's conclusions for the rejection and insisted the decision should be decided via referendum.

Supporters of the royal coat of arms criticise the Soviet-era design's socialist imagery, while supporters of the Soviet-era emblem feel as though they are having a royal coat of arms imposed on them. On 1 November 2018, Governor Dmitry Ovsyannikov made a decree allowing the Soviet-era design to be used as the city's coat of arms until the appropriate laws are put in place. On 3 July 2019, he introduced a bill to the Legislative Assembly, which again attempted to confirm the Soviet-era emblem as the official coat of arms. The bill was rejected on the basis of the Heraldic Council's previous analysis of the coat of arms.
