= Tamila Tasheva =

Ukrainian activist and politician

- Таміла Ташева
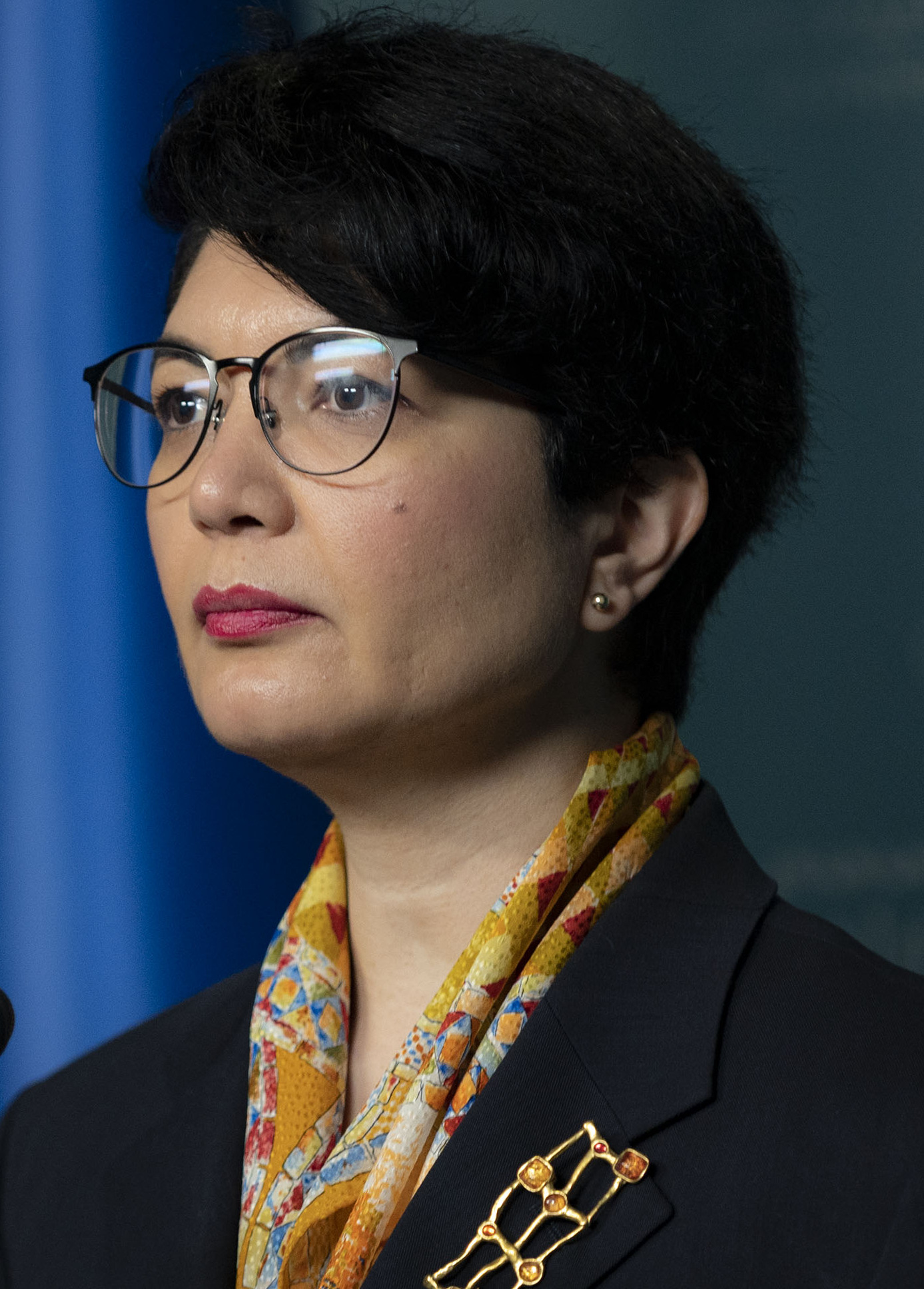
- Tasheva in 2022

Member of the Verkhonva Rada
- Incumbent
- Assumed office 25 November 2024

Permanent Representative of the President of Ukraine in the Autonomous Republic of Crimea
- In office 25 April 2022 – 25 November 2024
- President: Volodymyr Zelenskyy
- Preceded by: Anton Korynevych
- Succeeded by: Olha Kuryshko

Personal details
- Born: 1 August 1985 (age 41) Samarkand, Uzbek SSR, Soviet Union
- Party: Holos
- Education: Tavrida National V.I. Vernadsky University

Tamila Ravilivna Tasheva (Ukrainian: Таміла Равілівна Ташева; Crimean Tatar: Tamila Taşeva; born 1 August 1985) is a Ukrainian activist and politician serving as a Member of the Verkhovna Rada since 25 November 2024. She also served as the Permanent Representative of the President of Ukraine in the Autonomous Republic of Crimea from 2022 to 2024.

== Biography ==
She was born on 1 August 1985, in Samarkand, Uzbek SSR, USSR, to a deported Crimean Tatar family. In 1991, she returned to Crimea with her family, like many other Crimean Tatars, and settled in Simferopol. She graduated at the Faculty of Oriental Languages at the Tavrida National V.I. Vernadsky University.

She participated in the Orange Revolution and organized rallies in Crimea. She later headed the Foundation for Regional Initiatives NGO branch in Crimea.

In 2006, she became an assistant to the people's deputy Lesya Orobets. She worked as an analyst for Viktor Yuschenko's Our Ukraine party. In 2010, she received a management position at the Nash Format publishing house. She later became a PR manager of the TIK band.

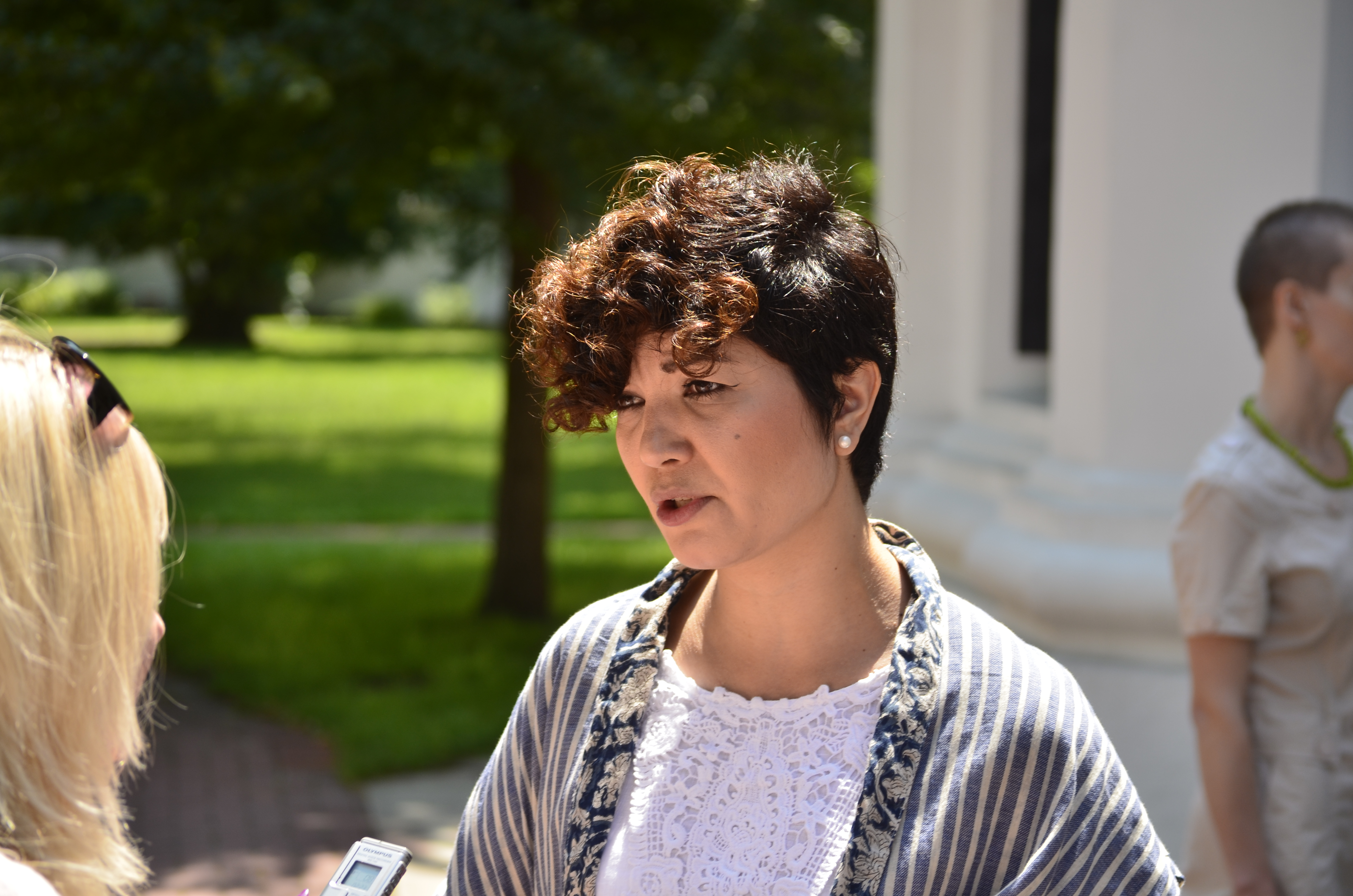
During press conference in 2015, Monuments of Ukraine Crimea contest.

In December 2013, Tasheva took part in the Revolution of Dignity and demonstrations against Viktor Yanukovych's regime. In the winter of 2014, Tasheva, along with several other activists, created a Facebook page CrimeaSOS, which covered events leading up to the Russian annexation of Crimea. In early March, activists opened a hotline for asylum seekers in peaceful areas of the country. Soon CrimeaSOS grew into a wide volunteer network, which began to provide assistance to residents of the ATO Zone. Eventually, CrimeaSOS became a full-fledged public organization.

Following the Russian annexation of Crimea, Tasheva gathered facts about the disappearance, abuse and violation of Crimean Tatars.

In the 2019 parliamentary election, Tasheva ran for People's Deputy of Ukraine, as a candidate of Holos. On 25 October 2019, President Volodymyr Zelenskyy appointed Tasheva as a deputy representative of the Crimea. On 25 April 2022 Tasheva was promoted to the new Permanent Representative of the President of Ukraine in the Autonomous Republic of Crimea, replacing Anton Korynevych.

After the Russian invasion of Ukraine, she remained active in tracking the fate of Ukrainians and Crimean Tatars remaining on the Crimean peninsula.

== Awards ==
- In 2016 she received a medal "25 years of independence of Ukraine". The medal was for her as a chairman of the board of "Crimea SOS" organization (Крим SOS).
- On 20 February 2019, she was awarded the Order of Princess Olga for civic courage, selfless defence of the constitutional principles of democracy, human rights and freedoms, revealed during the Revolution of Dignity, fruitful public and volunteer activity.
- On 25 October 2019, Tamila Tasheva became the winner of the Polish Sergio Vieira di Mello Award in the "Personality" category. The award is determined annually in two equivalent categories: the individual and the non-governmental organization, whose activities are aimed at the peaceful coexistence and cooperation between societies, religions and cultures.
