= Arkadiy Shestakov (politician) =

Ukrainian politician (1939–2002)

Arkadii Shestakov
- Аркадій Шестаков

Mayor of Sevastopol
- In office 1 April 1990 – 5 February 1991
- Succeeded by: Ivan Yermakov

Personal details
- Born: 6 February 1939 Kraskovo, Moscow Oblast, Soviet Union
- Died: April 10, 2002 (aged 70) Ukraine
- Party: Batkivshchyna

Arkadiy Mykolaiovych Shestakov (Ukrainian: Аркадій Миколайович Шестаков; 6 February 1939 – 10 April 2002), was a Russian-born Soviet and Ukrainian politician who served as Mayor of Sevastopol from 1990 to 1991.

== Early life ==
Arkadiy Shestakov was born in Kraskovo, Moscow Oblast on 6 February 1939. From 1953 to 1959, he studied at Kherson Maritime College, specializing in marine navigation.

== Career ==
=== Sailing business ===
In 1959, he began as an assistant captain of the emergency response unit in the motor fishing station near the city of Ochakiv. That year, he was promoted to 1st class sailor in Kerch before being demoted to 2nd assistant captain-director and transferred to Sevastopol.

In 1962, he was promoted to the senior assistant captain-director of ships "Yevpatoria" and "Argo", then in 1964 became captain-director of ships "Canopus" and "Natalia Kovshova". In 1977, Shestakov became the director of the association "Atlantika".

=== Entry into Politics ===
From 1983 to 1985, he was the student of the Academy of National Economy in Moscow. Then from 1985 to 1989, he was the Representative of the Soviet Ministry of the Fishing Industry in Mauritania. From 1988 to 1990, he was also the head of the Yemen Industrial Expedition of the fishing center "Azcherryba", which is based in Sevastopol.

In April 1990, he was the head of a team which helped create a flotilla of tuna seiners from Yuzhryba BPO.

=== Sevastopol City Council ===
Also in 1990, Shestakov was elected to the Sevastopol City Council. At the time, the Soviet Union was in the process of perestroika and the city council was being restructured into legislative and executive levels, the Sevastopol City Council and Sevastopol City State Administration respectively, each with a separate chairman. Shestakov originally ran for city council chairman, but lost to Yuriy Stupnikov by 49 votes, and became executive committee chairman instead. (Note: Shestakov won with 85 votes in favor and 64 votes against, and beat two serious competitors: V. Parfisenko (29 for, 120 against) and V. Sokolsky (33 for, 116 against).)

During his post, Shestakov pursued greater independence for the executive committee from the legislative council, especially when dealing with the city's economy. He lamented the lack of executive power from the committee in the face of economic turmoil, but also made sure to not place blame on his predecessors, saying that "my predecessors did a lot of useful things for the city, and it is not their fault that the general economic structure in the country negated many practical efforts. We, the current executive committee, are responsible for all troubles and disorders. The demand is from us, not from the past." Shestakov sought to promote economic growth in the city by developing commercial activity, solving obstacles related to foreign direct investment, and organizing business tourism that benefits the city and provides foreign currency.

However, Shestakov's policies received some pushback from local residents, and Shestakov himself lost interest in keeping his position. At the same time, then-chairman of the Sevastopol City Council Yuriy Stupnikov tried to again combine the positions of the legislative and executive chairmen, but the issue was not voted on during council sessions.

In February 1991, Stupnikov resigned as chairman, and Shestakov again decided to run for city council chairman. He came up second with 77 votes, losing to Ivan Yermakov who won 90 votes. Shetakov later also decided to resign from his post as executive chairman, though he remained as a deputy in the city council.

== Later activities and death ==
From April 1992 to November 1994, Shestakov was the President of the Maritime Commodity Exchange of the city of Sevastopol. Additionally, he was the President of the Sea Commodity Exchange until 2000, and served as the chairman of the State Agency of Fisheries of Ukraine.

Shestakov was a member of the Batkivshchyna party.

Shestakov died in April 2002.
