= Sevastopol City Committee of the Communist Party of the Soviet Union =

The Sevastopol City Committee of the Communist Party of the Soviet Union, commonly referred to as the Sevastopol CPSU gorkom, was the position of highest authority in the city of Sevastopol.

The position was created in 1954, and abolished in August 1991.

The First Secretary was a de facto appointed position usually by the Politburo or the General Secretary himself.

== First Secretaries ==
Name	Term of Office		Life years
Name	Start	End	Life years
Andriy Korovchenko	October 1954	April 1960	1920–1965
Valentyn Pashkov	1961	1972	1919–1982
Viktor Makarenko	15 June 1972	July 1977	1931–2007
Borys Chernychkin	1977	1984	1942–
Oleksiy Smolyannikov	May 1984	1988	1937–
Pavlo Vlasenko	1988	July 1990	1942–
Vasyl Parkhomenko	July 1990	26 August 1991	1947–

== See also ==
- Sevastopol City State Administration
- Sevastopol City Council

== Sources ==
- World Statesmen.org
