= Valeriy Horbatov =

Ukrainian politician (born 1955)

- Валерій Горбатов
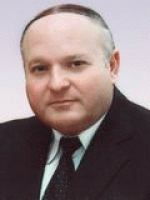
- Official portrait, 2002

People's Deputy of Ukraine
- In office 11 May 1994 – 25 May 2006
- Preceded by: Constituency established
- Succeeded by: Constituency abolished
- Constituency: Autonomous Republic of Crimea, No. 37 (1994–1998); Autonomous Republic of Crimea, No. 6 (1998–2006)

Prime Minister of Crimea
- In office 25 July 2001 – 29 April 2002
- Presidential Representative: Anatoliy Korniychuk
- Preceded by: Serhiy Kunitsyn
- Succeeded by: Serhiy Kunitsyn

Personal details
- Born: 27 June 1955 (age 71), Nechayane, Mykolaiv Oblast, Ukrainian SSR, Soviet Union
- Party: Motherland Defenders Party (2005–present)
- Other political affiliations: Independent (until 2000); Labour Ukraine (2000–2002); Social Democratic Party of Ukraine (united) (2002–2005)
- Spouse: Yevhenia
- Children: Olha, Yuriy
- Education: Kherson State Agrarian and Economic University

Valeriy Myronovych Horbatov (Ukrainian: Валерій Миронович Горбатов; born 27 June 1955) is a Ukrainian politician and scientist.

In 2000 and 2001 Horbatov was Prime Minister of the Autonomous Republic of Crimea.

Following the 2022 Russian invasion of Ukraine Horbatov fled Kyiv and is believed (by non-governmental organisation Chesno) to have fled to the Russian-occupied territories of Ukraine.

In April 2022 the National Police of Ukraine opened an investigation into Horbatov on charges of "financing of the terrorist organisation Donetsk People's Republic. It was established that after the occupation of part of Ukraine by Russia, Horbatov continued to carry out his business activities there and paid taxes to Russia. Also was discover that he had stolen from Crimean museums and bought from "black archaeologists" valuable archaeological finds. Those seized during the investigation were exhibited in the National Museum of the History of Ukraine in August 2023.

Preceded by post created	Presidential representative of Ukraine in Crimea; 1994–1996	Succeeded by Dmytro Stepanyuk
Preceded by Serhiy Kunitsyn	Prime Minister of Crimea; 2001–2002	Succeeded by Serhiy Kunitsyn
