= Serhiy Kunitsyn =

Ukrainian politician and veteran administrator

- Сергій Куніцин
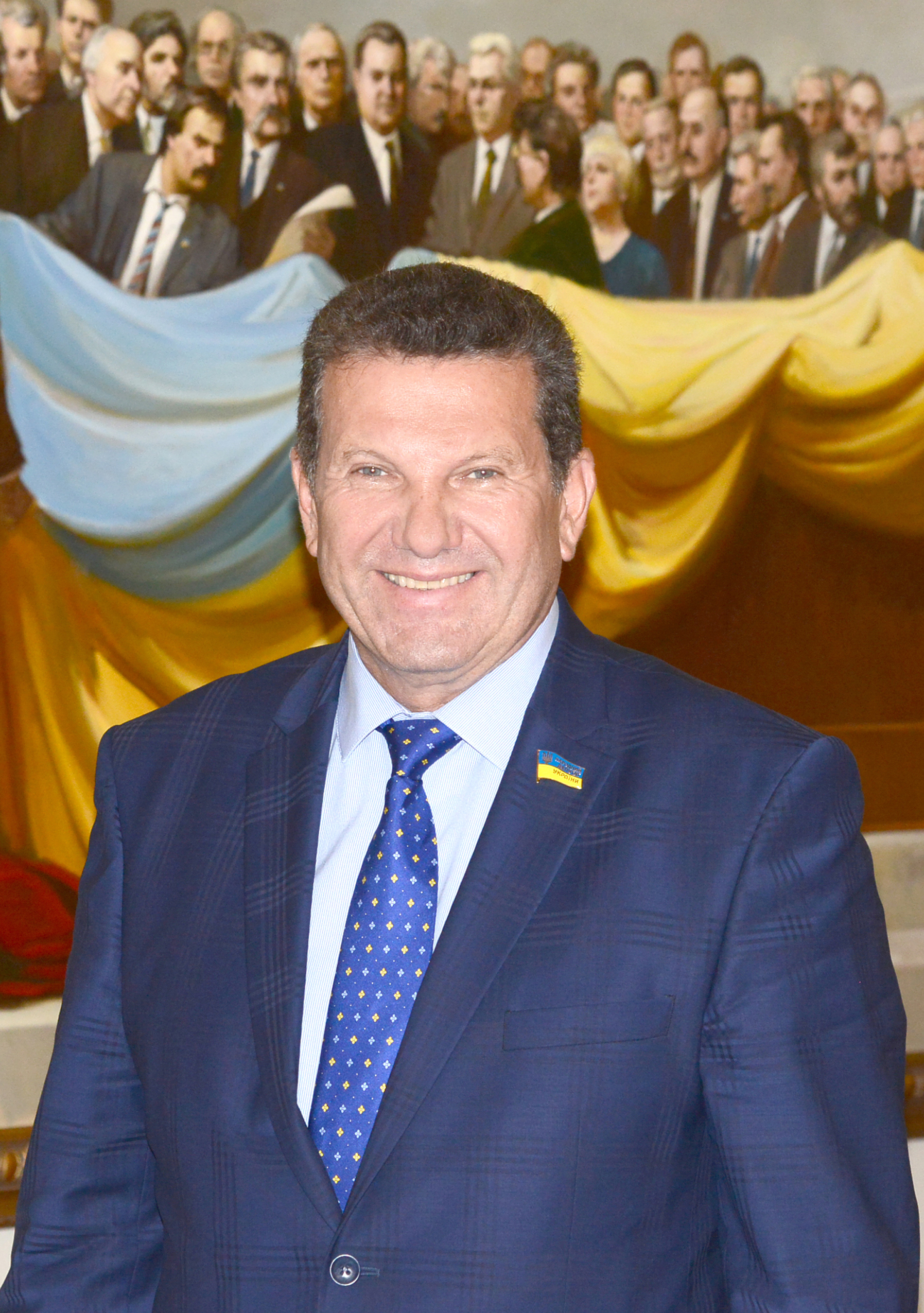
- Kunitsyn in 2016

Prime Minister of Crimea
- In office 29 April 2002 – 20 April 2005
- Preceded by: Valeriy Horbatov
- Succeeded by: Anatoliy Matviyenko
- In office 27 May 1998 – 25 July 2001
- Preceded by: Anatoliy Franchuk
- Succeeded by: Valeriy Horbatov

Governor of Sevastopol
- In office 1 June 2006 – 6 April 2010
- Preceded by: Serhiy Ivanov
- Succeeded by: Valeriy Saratov

Presidential representative in Crimea
- In office 6 April 2010 – 13 November 2010
- Preceded by: Leonid Zhunko
- Succeeded by: Viktor Plakida
- In office 27 February 2014 – 26 March 2014
- Preceded by: Viktor Plakida
- Succeeded by: Natalia Popovych

Mayor of Krasnoperekopsk
- In office April 1990 – 1998

Personal details
- Born: 27 July 1960 (age 66) Bekdash, Krasnovodsky Raion, Turkmen SSR, Soviet Union
- Party: Petro Poroshenko Bloc (2014–present); Ukrainian Democratic Alliance for Reform (2012–2014); Soyuz (2010–2012); United Centre (2008–2009); People's Democratic Party (2005–2008); Communist Party of Ukraine (1987–1991)
- Spouse: Yulia
- Children: Natalia, Oleksiy
- Education: Simferopol branch of the Cisdnieper State Academy; Tavrida National University

Serhiy Volodymyrovych Kunitsyn (Ukrainian: Сергій Володимирович Куніцин; born 27 July 1960) is a Ukrainian politician, military veteran, administrator, and sports official from Crimea. A combat veteran of the Soviet–Afghan War, he served as two-time Prime Minister of Crimea (1998–2001, 2002–2005), Governor of Sevastopol (2006–2010), and Presidential Representative in Crimea (2010, 2014).

Since December 2014, Kunitsyn has served as a member of the Verkhovna Rada as an independent politician for the Petro Poroshenko Bloc.

== Early life, education, and Soviet–Afghan war ==
Serhiy Kunitsyn was born on 27 July 1960 in the coastal industrial town of Bekdash in the Turkmen SSR, Soviet Union, where his parents had relocated for industrial work. Moving to Ukraine in his youth, he attended the Simferopol branch of the Dnipropetrovsk Construction Engineering Institute, graduating in 1982 with a degree in civil engineering and concrete construction technology.

Following graduation, he briefly worked for "Perekop Chemical Construction" in Krasnoperekopsk before being conscripted into mandatory service in the Soviet Armed Forces in 1983.

Kunitsyn was deployed to Afghanistan during the Soviet–Afghan War, where he served in an airborne assault unit (*desantno-shturmovoy batalyon*) within the Soviet Airborne Forces. During his combat deployment between 1983 and 1984, he participated in reconnaissance and assault operations, sustained injuries and shell-shock during heavy fighting, and lost numerous comrades in combat. For his actions under fire, he was decorated with the Soviet Order of the Red Star and the Medal "For Battle Merit".

== Industrial and early municipal career ==
Upon returning to civilian life in 1985, Kunitsyn joined the "Crimea Canal Construction" organization as a production engineer. Shortly thereafter, he was appointed chief engineer at the Krasnoperekopsk Reinforced Concrete Plant, leading industrial operations until 1989.

In 1989–1990, he worked briefly as an instructor in the ideological department of the Krasnoperekopsk city committee of the Communist Party of Ukraine. In March 1990, during Ukraine's first competitive Soviet-era parliamentary elections, Kunitsyn was elected a People's Deputy of Ukraine to the 1st Verkhovna Rada. In April 1990, he was simultaneously elected Mayor of Krasnoperekopsk, holding municipal leadership for eight years until 1998.

During the mid-1990s, amidst post-Soviet economic collapse, Kunitsyn established the "North Crimean Experimental Economic Zone 'Syvash'" (1995–2001). Acting as its chief administrator, he engineered tax incentives that successfully attracted manufacturing investments, revitalized local chemical enterprises, and established a economic model later replicated in other Ukrainian regions.

== Prime Minister of Crimea and Governor of Sevastopol ==
Kunitsyn served as Chairman of the Council of Ministers of Crimea (Prime Minister of Crimea) during two distinct terms: from 27 May 1998 to 24 July 2001, and from 29 April 2002 to 20 April 2005. Between these terms, he served as a political advisor on Crimean affairs to President Leonid Kuchma.

As Premier, Kunitsyn navigated complex inter-ethnic political dynamics involving the indigenous Crimean Tatars returning from exile, as well as political friction with pro-Russian separatist factions in the Crimean parliament. He maintained close working ties with President Kuchma, later recalling that Kuchma exercised effective authority in balancing Russian interests, including the Tuzla Island conflict of 2003.

In June 2006, President Viktor Yushchenko appointed Kunitsyn as Chairman of the Sevastopol City State Administration (Governor of Sevastopol). During his governorship until April 2010, Kunitsyn focused on modernizing urban infrastructure, resolving land allocation controversies, and managing delicate relations with the home port of Russia's Black Sea Fleet.

In April 2010, incoming President Viktor Yanukovych appointed Kunitsyn as Presidential Representative in Crimea, a role he relinquished in November 2010. He joined the UDAR party led by Vitali Klitschko and was re-elected to the Verkhovna Rada in the 2012 Ukrainian parliamentary election.

== Role in the 2014 Russian annexation of Crimea ==
On 27 February 2014, as Russian special operations forces began seizing key administrative facilities in Simferopol during the 2014 annexation of Crimea, acting President Oleksandr Turchynov appointed Kunitsyn as Permanent Representative of the President of Ukraine in Crimea.

Kunitsyn immediately flew into Simferopol to establish an emergency command post. In his accounts of the crisis, Kunitsyn detailed how he mobilized Crimean Afghan War veterans, attempted to organize local law enforcement, and urged military commanders in Kyiv to issue clear engagement directives to isolated Ukrainian military garrisons. He noted that Western diplomatic communications—specifically instructions from Obama administration officials advising Kyiv against provoking open military conflict—contributed to hesitation among central authorities.

Frustrated by what he publicly termed the "toothless and indecisive response" of the central government, Kunitsyn tendered his resignation on 24 March 2014. President Turchynov formally accepted his resignation on 26 March.

== Post-2014 career and civic leadership ==
On 25 June 2014, President Petro Poroshenko appointed Kunitsyn as a presidential advisor on defense and veteran social policy. In the 2014 Ukrainian parliamentary election, Kunitsyn was re-elected as a People's Deputy on the list of the Petro Poroshenko Bloc (68th candidate).

Kunitsyn has been a key organizer in the veteran movement for decades. Since February 2004, he led the Crimean regional chapter of the Ukrainian Society of Afghanistan Veterans. He later assumed national executive leadership within the Ukrainian Union of Veterans of Afghanistan. In 2020, President Volodymyr Zelenskyy appointed Kunitsyn Head of the Advisory Council on Veteran and Volunteer Support under the Office of the President of Ukraine, coordinating medical rehabilitation, legal protection, and social integration for military veterans.

== Sports management ==
Kunitsyn has been an influential figure in Ukrainian sports administration, particularly in Crimean football.

=== Republican Football Federation of Crimea ===
From July 2003 to April 2013, Kunitsyn served as the president of the Republican Football Federation of Crimea, overseeing the regional development of amateur and youth football across the Crimean peninsula.

=== SC Tavriya Simferopol ===
For over two decades, Kunitsyn was the central executive figure behind SC Tavriya Simferopol, the historic club that won the inaugural 1992 Ukrainian Premier League championship. When he initially took over leadership of the club in the late 1990s and early 2000s, Tavriya was heavily influenced by Crimean organized crime syndicates—most notably the powerful "Bashmaki" gang, which used the club's administration, infrastructure, and player transfers for money laundering and regional influence. Kunitsyn systematically wrested control of Tavriya away from local criminal influence, restructuring its management under transparent corporate oversight.

To secure the club's long-term financial stability and transform it into a competitive force, Kunitsyn successfully attracted Ukrainian billionaire investor Dmytro Firtash (owner of Group DF) as the primary sponsor and owner. Firtash's multi-million dollar investments allowed Tavriya to build modern training facilities, stabilize its operations, and attract top playing talent.

Under Kunitsyn's leadership and Firtash's financial backing, Tavriya won the 2009–10 Ukrainian Cup, defeating FC Metalurh Donetsk 3–2 in extra time, which earned the team a place in the 2010–11 UEFA Europa League.

In March 2012, Kunitsyn assumed direct operational management as General Director, and on 26 November 2012, he was officially appointed President of SC Tavriya Simferopol. He remained at the helm until the political crisis and subsequent Russian occupation of Crimea in 2014.

=== Post-2014 relocation and UAF leadership ===
Following the 2014 Russian annexation of Crimea, the original club in Simferopol was dissolved. Kunitsyn played a key role in preserving the club's heritage by spearheading its re-establishment on Ukrainian-controlled territory in 2016. Relocated to Beryslav in Kherson Oblast, the restarted SC Tavriya resumed competing in professional Ukrainian football (in the Ukrainian Second League).

Additionally, Kunitsyn served as a Vice-President of the Ukrainian Association of Football (UAF).

== Personal life ==
Serhiy Kunitsyn married his wife Yulia in 1982. They have two children: a daughter, Natalia (born 1986), and a son, Oleksiy (born 1991).

== See also ==
- Electoral Bloc of Kunitsyn

Political offices
Preceded by Anatoliy Franchuk	Prime Minister of Crimea; 1998–2001	Succeeded by Valeriy Horbatov
Preceded by Valeriy Horbatov	Prime Minister of Crimea; 2002–2005	Succeeded by Anatoliy Matviyenko
Preceded by Serhiy Ivanov	Governor of Sevastopol; 2005–2010	Succeeded by Valeriy Saratov
Preceded by Leonid Zhunko	Presidential representative in Crimea; 2010	Succeeded by Volodymyr Yatsuba
Preceded by Viktor Plakida	Presidential representative in Crimea Acting; 2014	Succeeded by Natalia Popovych
