= Presidential representative of Ukraine in Crimea =

Permanent representative of the president of Ukraine in the Autonomous Republic of Crimea
- Logo of the Permanent Representative's office

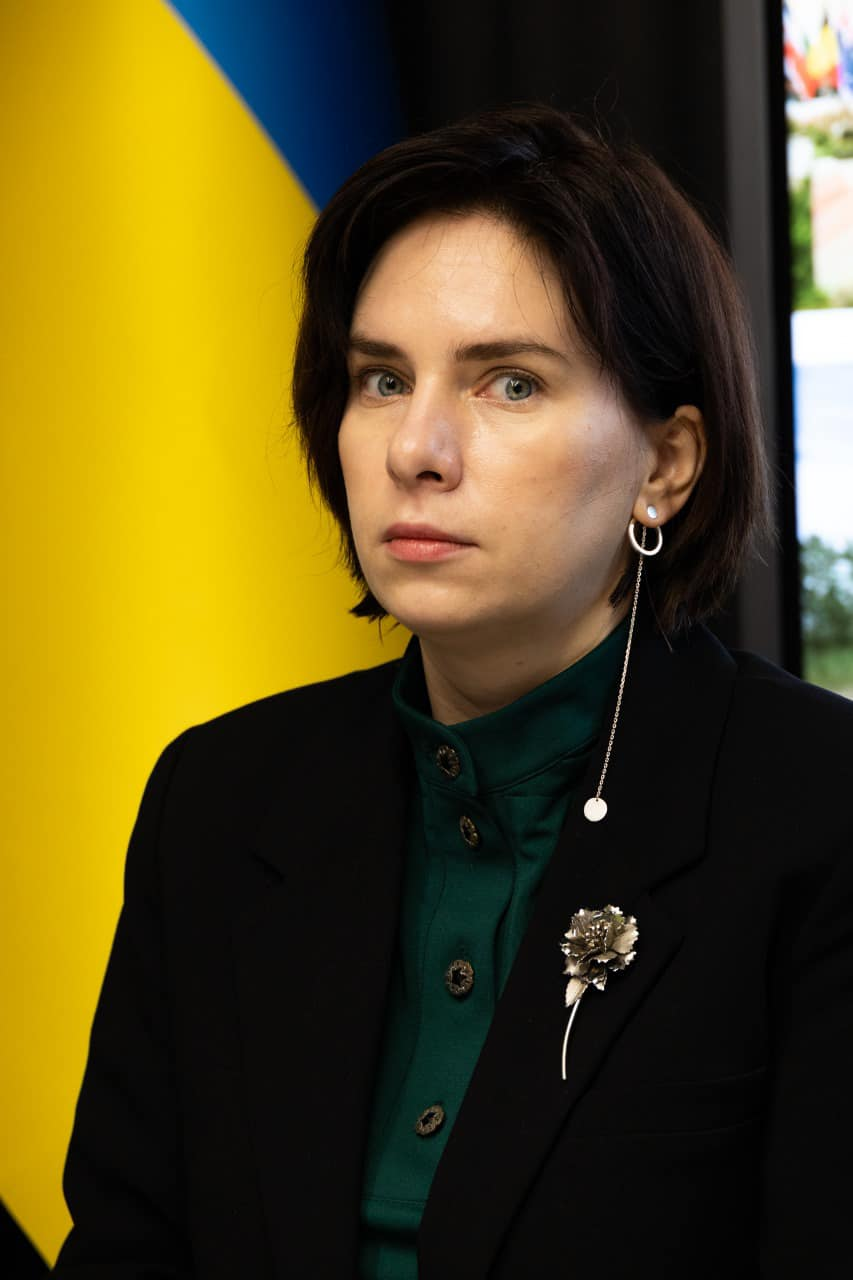
- Incumbent; Olha Kuryshko since 24 January 2024
- Residence: Simferopol (de jure)
- Formation: 14 May 1992 (by the Verkhovna Rada)
- First holder: Valeriy Horbatov
- Website: www.ppu.gov.ua

The permanent representative of the president of Ukraine in the Autonomous Republic of Crimea (Ukrainian: Постійний Представник Президента України в АР Крим, romanized: Postiinyi Predstavnyk Prezydenta Ukrainy v AR Krym) represents the president of Ukraine in the Autonomous Republic of Crimea.

Originally created in 1992 as the Presidential representative of Ukraine in Crimea, the first representative was not appointed until March 1994. The first representative was Valeriy Horbatov, who worked as a head of the Krupskaya collective farm in Nyzhnohirskyi Raion, Crimean Oblast.

== Presidential representatives ==
- 1994–1996: Valeriy Horbatov
- 1996–1997: Dmytro Stepanyuk
- 1997–1999: Vasiliy Kiselyov
- 1999–2002: Anatoliy Korniychuk
- 2002–2004: Oleksandr Didenko
- 2005–2006: Volodymyr Kulish
- 2006–2007: Hennadiy Moskal
- 2007–2007: Viktor Shemchuk
- 2007–2007: Volodymyr Khomenko
- 2008–2010: Leonid Zhunko
- 2010–2010: Serhiy Kunitsyn
- 2010–2011: Viktor Plakida (acting)
- 2011–2011: Volodymyr Yatsuba
- 2012–2014: Viktor Plakida (acting in 2011–12)
- 2014–2014: Serhiy Kunitsyn (acting)
- 2014–2017: Natalia Popovych (Note: On 16 May 2014, the Permanent Mission of the President of Ukraine in the Autonomous Republic of Crimea was, according to acting President Oleksandr Turchynov, temporarily moved to Kherson; Crimea has been occupied by Russia since it invaded and annexed the peninsula in 2014.)
- 2017–2018: Borys Babin
- 2018–2019: Izet Hdanov (acting, as first deputy)
- 2019–2022: Anton Korynevych
- 2022–2024 Tamila Tasheva
- 2024–present: Olha Kuryshko

== See also ==
- Representatives of the President of Ukraine
- Prime Minister of Crimea
