= Dmitry Belik =

Russian politician (born 1969)

Dmitry Belik MP
- Дмитрий Белик
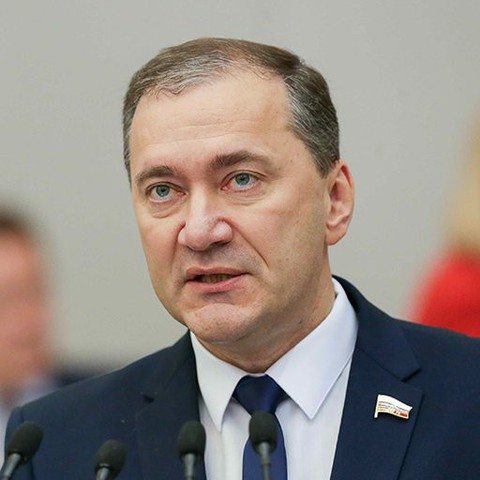
- Belik in 2018

Member of the State Duma (Party List Seat)
- Incumbent
- Assumed office 12 October 2021

Member of the State Duma for Sevastopol
- In office 5 October 2016 – 12 October 2021
- Preceded by: constituency established
- Succeeded by: Tatiana Lobach
- Constituency: Sevastopol-at-large (No. 219)

Deputy Secretary of the Sevastopol Branch of United Russia
- In office 14 May 2014 – 5 October 2016
- Preceded by: position established
- Succeeded by: Tatiana Lobach

Head of Sevastopol acting
- In office 4 March 2014 – 13 May 2014
- Preceded by: Fedir Rubanov (acting) (de jure)
- Succeeded by: Aleksei Chaly (as acting Governor of Sevastopol)

Personal details
- Born: 17 October 1969 (age 56) Kular, Ust-Yansky District, Russian SSR
- Party: United Russia
- Education: RANEPA
- Religion: Russian Orthodox

Dmitry Anatolyevich Belik (Russian: Дмитрий Анатольевич Белик; born 17 October 1969) is a Russian politician who is currently a member of parliament in the State Duma of the VII convocation, a member of the United Russia party, and a member of the State Duma committee on control and regulations and a member since 5 October 2016.

He was the acting head of Sevastopol from 4 March 2014 to 13 May 2014, as he was an active participant in the occupation of Crimea by Russia.

== Biography ==
Dmitry Belik was born in Kular, Ust-Yansky District, Russia, on 17 October 1969. According to some other sources, they indicate that he was born on 1 January 1970.

Belik moved to Sevastopol from Kemerovo in 1990.

From May 1995 to June 2013 he was director, then demoted to deputy director of the private enterprise Big Crimea in Sevastopol.

In 2006 he graduated from the Modern Humanitarian Academy in Moscow with a degree in economics.

In 2007 he founded the first private Orthodox general education school "Mariampol" in Sevastopol.

Belyk was a member of the Sevastopol City Council of the IV, V, and VI convocations. He was the chairman of the Land Commission; in the 5th convocation, and the chairman of the Standing Committee on Urban Development Policy, Regulation of Land and Water Relations.

In the 6th convocation, he was the chairman of the standing commission on industry, agro-industrial complex, trade and entrepreneurship, and a member of the standing commission on social and humanitarian issues as of 21 June 2013.

He was a member of the Party of Regions.

Simultaneously, from 21 June 2013, Belyk became the deputy chairman of the Sevastopol City State Administration for Social Policy.

From 4 March 2014 to 13 May 2014, Belik served as the acting head of the administration of Sevastopol. He supported the beginning of the temporary occupation of Crimea and took an active part in the work of the occupying government.

Since 2014 he has been a deputy secretary of the Sevastopol Regional Branch and a member of the Regional Political Council of the Sevastopol Branch of the United Russia party.

Since 2015 he has been wanted by the prosecutor's office of Ukraine on suspicion of high treason.

On 22 May 2016 he won the preliminary party vote of the United Russia party and was nominated as a candidate for the State Duma in Sevastopol at the 15th party congress. In the parliamentary elections of the State Duma on 18 September 2016, Belik, as in Sevastopol single-mandate constituency No. 219, had won in a single-mandate constituency, gaining 46,960 votes (33.24%).

In the VII convocation of the State Duma, he is a member of the United Russia faction and is a member of the committee on budget and taxes.

=== Sanctions ===
He was sanctioned by Canada under the Special Economic Measures Act (S.C. 1992, c. 17) in relation to the Russian invasion of Ukraine for Grave Breach of International Peace and Security, and by the UK government in 2016 in relation to the Russo-Ukrainian War.

Since November 2016 Belik and among the 6 members of the State Duma elected in Crimea, has been subject to sanctions imposed by the European Union, with a ban on entry to the territory of the European Community and freezing of their accounts in the EU.

=== Legislative Activity ===
Between 2016 and 2019, during his term of office as a deputy of the State Duma of the VII convocation, Belik co-authored 97 legislative initiatives and amendments to draft federal laws.

=== Political Activity ===
Belik had been an author of more than 80 draft decisions of the Sevastopol City Council, including regulation on public hearings, the concept of preserving the historical buildings in Sevastopol, on the limitation of the number of floors in the historical center of the city, and the prohibition of the use of the communal property for the implementation of the "methadone program."

He also had initiated citywide public hearings, which included "City against drugs" in a call against the introduction of the methadone program in Sevastopol. "We speak Russian – we study in Russian," with the Russian language, based on their results, a decision was made by the City Council session on the recognition of Russian as the language of regional communication and "On the ways of development of KP “Sevelektroavtotrans", which is about the reorganization of the Sevastopol trolleybus system.

Belyk had also been a delegate of the 1st Congress in Severodonetsk, the 2nd Congress of Deputies of all levels of southeastern and central Ukraine in Severodonetsk.

In 2008 he was one of the initiators of the installation of the monument to Catherine II, opposed the building on the Grafska pier of the plaque "90 years of the Ukrainian fleet", was one of the initiators of the proposal to award Yury Luzhkov the title of "Honorary Citizen of Sevastopol."

On 30 December 2009 he initiated an extraordinary session of the Sevastopol City Council on the situation in Sevastopol from 26 December 2009. Then, the Svoboda party marched down Lenin Street, where the deputies demanded a ban on the activities of Svoboda members.

In the 2012 elections to the Verkhovna Rada, Belik ran from the Russian Bloc party in the 224th constituency of Sevastopol, gaining 27.8% of the votes, and became the second after Pavlo Lebedyev. He did not participate in the repeated elections in connection with the transfer of Lebedyev to the post of Minister of Defense of Ukraine but supported the oligarch Vadym Novynskyi.

Since 26 December 2012 he has headed the Coordination Council of Organizations of Russian Compatriots (KSORS) at the Consulate General of Russia in Crimea. On 16 July 2013, he announced his withdrawal from the Russian Bloc faction of the Sevastopol City Council. (Note: Coordination Council of Organizations of Russian Compatriots (KSORS) (Russian: (KCOPC)) in the United States closed in November 2021.)

Belik became the acting head of the Sevastopol Administration on 7 March 2014 and issued an order banning the use of the state Ukrainian language in the Sevastopol City State Administration in office work and document flow and on the use of Russian as the official language for paperwork and document flow.

== Family ==
He is married, and has one child.

== Income and assets ==
Official income for 2021: 5,666,917.19 rubles.

Real estate

He owns dozens of real estate properties, including:

- Land plot: 206 m²
- Land plot: 425 m² (shared ownership, 1/2 share)
- Land plot: 962 m²
- Residential house: 48.5 m² (shared ownership, 1/2 share)
- Residential house: 216.9 m²
- Residential house: 389.5 m²
- Apartment: 108.6 m²
- Non-residential premises: 59.9 m²
- Non-residential building: 173.6 m² (shared ownership, 1/4 share)

Spouse's property:

- Land plot: 206 m²
- Land plot: 493 m²
- Land plot: 962 m²
- Residential building: 35.6 m²
- Residential house: 135.9 m²
- Residential house: 216.9 m²
- Residential house: 389.5 m²
- Apartment: 108.6 m²

Child's property:

- Land plot: 206 m²
- Land plot: 962 m²
- Residential house: 216.9 m²
- Residential house: 389.5 m²
- Apartment: 108.6 m²

== Personal life ==
Belik had also been a general producer of the documentary film about Stanislav Chyzh, who was the People's Artist of Crimea, the honorary citizen of Sevastopol, and the creator of the monument to Catherine II.

=== Family ===
He is married and is raising three children (four, according to other sources).\
