= Arkadiy Shestakov =

Arkadiy Shestakov may refer to:

- Arkadiy Shestakov (ice hockey)
- Arkadiy Shestakov (politician)
