= Leonid Zhunko =

Ukrainian politician

- Леонід Жунько

Presidential representative in Crimea
- In office 30 January 2008 – 6 April 2010
- Preceded by: Volodymyr Khomenko
- Succeeded by: Serhiy Kunitsyn

Governor of Sevastopol
- In office 12 April 1999 – 4 February 2005
- Preceded by: Borys Kucher
- Succeeded by: Serhiy Ivanov

Personal details
- Born: 9 June 1951 (age 74) Krasne Pole, Markivka Raion, Voroshilovhrad Oblast, Ukrainian SSR, Soviet Union

Leonid Mykhailovych Zhunko (Ukrainian: Леонід Михайлович Жунько; born 9 June 1951) is a Russian and formerly Ukrainian politician. In the 2000s he served as a Presidential Representative in Crimea as well as Governor of Sevastopol. In 2014, he supported the 2014 Russian annexation of Crimea as a member of the Sevastopol City Council, and subsequently took up Russian citizenship and was put on a wanted list by Ukraine for treason.

== Early life ==
Zhunko was bornn on 9 June 1951 in the village of Krasne Pole, which was then part of the Ukrainian SSR in the Soviet Union. After graduating from the Dmytro Motorny Taurida State Agrotechnological University, he moved to Crimea and became an engineer at a kolkhoz in Sevastopol until 1985.

== Political career ==
In 1985, he was appointed deputy chair then later first deputy chair of the Balaklava District of Sevastopol, which he did until 1992. In 1992, he was appointed deputy head of the Sevastopol City State Administration, until in 1995 he became director of the enterprise Sevahrotrans. Up until 1999 he worked as Head of the State Tax Inspectorate for the Nakhimov District and then Head of the State Tax Administration for the whole of Sevastopol.

In 1999, he became Head of the Sevastopol City State Administration (de facto governor). In this role, he was considered a protégé of Borys Kucher, and he prioritized secucring subsidies from Kyiv and enforcing strict financial discipline. However, he garnered some controversy when his son-in-law, Oleksii Bondar, rapidly rose within politics during Zhunko's tenure Upon his dismissal in 2005, he became chair of the Sevastopol branch of the association of democratic forces "Zlagoda" until 2007. In 2007, he became an adviser to Volodymyr Yatsuba, and then in January 2008 was appointed the Presidential representative in Crimea for Viktor Yushchenko, which he did until March 2010 when he was dismissed by the new president, Viktor Yanukovych. In 2010 he was elected to the Sevastopol City Council for the People's Party.

Following the events of Euromaidan, he voted in favour of the 2014 Russian annexation of Crimea, and following this in October 2015 he was put on the wanted list for high treason by Ukraine. He then took Russian citizenship, and withdrew from politics to become a pensioner. In 2016, he co-founded the Association of Farmers and Landowners "Sevastopol".
