= Izet Hdanov =

Ukrainian politician and activist

- Iзет Гданов
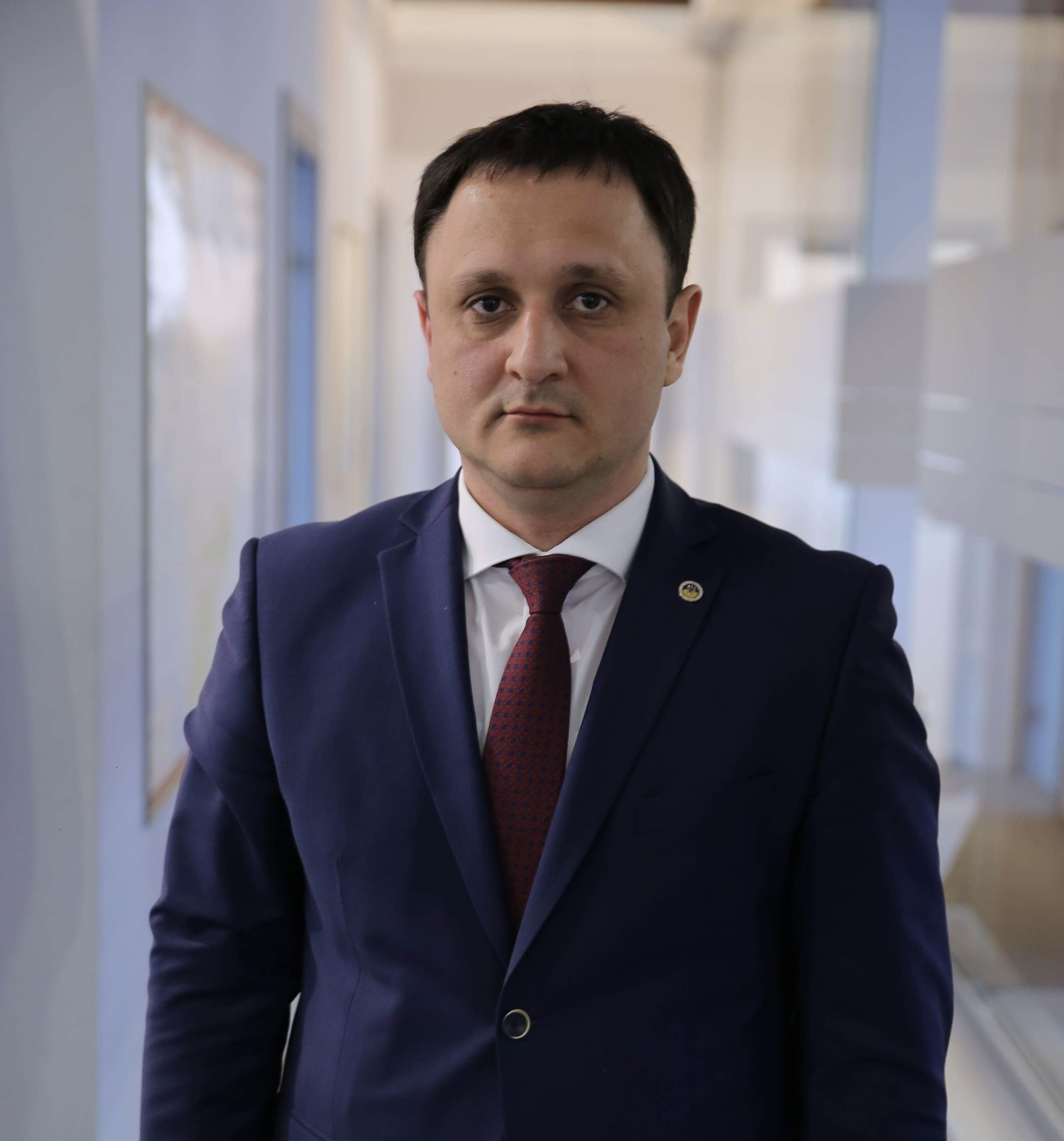
- Hdanov in 2023

Presidential representative of Ukraine in Crimea
- Acting
- In office 2 December 2018 – 25 June 2019
- President: Petro Poroshenko
- Preceded by: Borys Babin
- Succeeded by: Anton Korynevych

Personal details
- Born: 16 September 1983 (age 43) Fergana, Uzbek SSR, Soviet Union (now Uzbekistan)

Izet Rustemovych Hdanov (born 16 September 1983) is a Ukrainian politician and activist of Crimean Tatar ethnicity born to deported Crimean Tatars in the Soviet Uzbekistan.

In 2006 Hdanov graduated from the National Academy of the State Tax Service of Ukraine. In 2009–2011 he served as minister in the Crimean Government. In 2012 Hdanov went through an assassination attempt when two unknown younger people hit him on the head with a hammer.

In 2015, Hdanov was among the leaders of an energy of blockade with the Russian occupied Crimea.

In 2017 he was appointed as the first deputy presidential representative of Ukraine in Crimea. Following removal of Babin, Hdanov ex officio acts as presidential representative of Ukraine in Crimea.

On 8 April 2022, the Kyiv District Court of Simferopol sentenced Hdanov to 8 years in a strict regime colony for "participation in the activities of an illegal armed group operating on the territory of a foreign state for purposes contrary to the interests of the Russian Federation", accusing him of being involvement in the Noman Çelebicihan Battalion.
