= Roshal (town) =

Town in Moscow Oblast, Russia

Roshal Рошаль
- Town
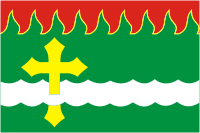
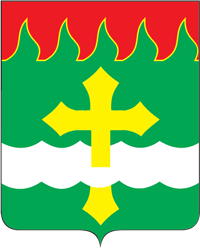
- Flag Coat of arms
- Interactive map of Roshal
- Location of Roshal Roshal (Moscow Oblast)
- Coordinates: 55°40′N 39°53′E
- Country: Russia
- Federal subject: Moscow Oblast
- Founded: 1916
- Town status since: 1940
- Elevation: 110 m (360 ft)

Population (2010 Census)
  - Total: 21,272
  - Estimate (2025): 20,757 (−2.4%)

Administrative status
  - Subordinated to: Roshal Town Under Oblast Jurisdiction
  - Capital of: Roshal Town Under Oblast Jurisdiction

Municipal status
  - Urban okrug: Roshal Urban Okrug
  - Capital of: Roshal Urban Okrug
- Time zone: UTC+3 (MSK)
- Postal code: 140730–140732
- OKTMO ID: 46586000006

Roshal (Russian: Роша́ль) is a town in Moscow Oblast, Russia, located on the Voymega River 156 kilometers (97 mi) east of Moscow. Population: 21,272 (2010 census); 22,407 (2002 census); 23,956 (1989 Soviet census).

== History ==
Roshal was founded in 1916 as a settlement of Krestov Brod (Крестов Брод). It was renamed Roshal in 1917 in honor of a Bolshevik Semyon Roshal (1896–1917) and granted town status in 1940.

== Administrative and municipal status ==
Within the framework of administrative divisions, it is incorporated as Roshal Town Under Oblast Jurisdiction—an administrative unit with the status equal to that of the districts. As a municipal division, Roshal Town Under Oblast Jurisdiction is incorporated as Roshal Urban Okrug.

== Notable people ==
- Valeriy Saratov (born 1953), Ukrainian politician
