= Olha Kuryshko =

Ukrainian politician (born 1988)

- Ольга Куришко
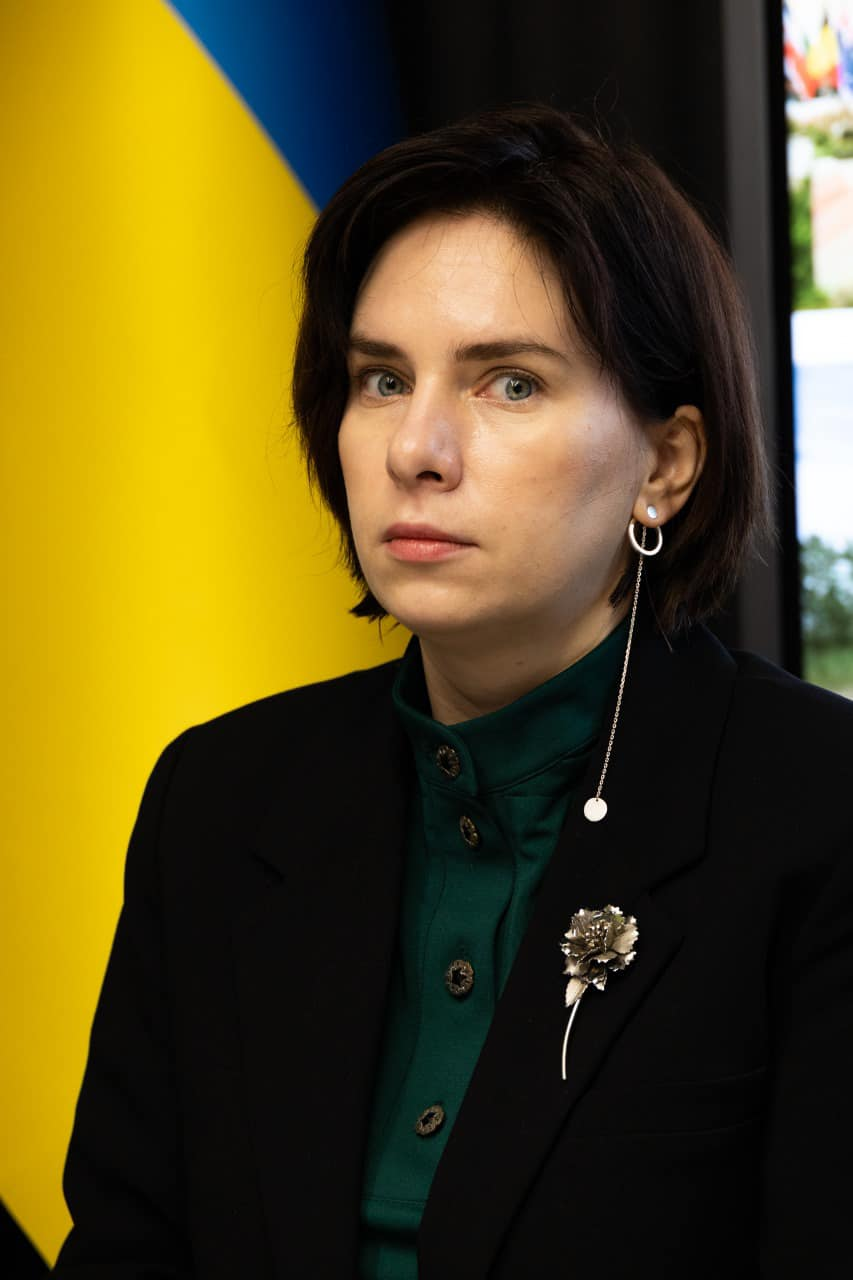
- Kuryshko in 2024

Presidential Representative of Ukraine in Crimea
- Incumbent
- Assumed office 24 January 2025
- President: Volodymyr Zelenskyy
- Preceded by: Tamila Tasheva

Personal details
- Born: 28 August 1988 (age 38) Poltava, Poltava Oblast, Ukrainian SSR, Soviet Union

Olha Mykolayivna Kuryshko (Ukrainian: Ольга Миколаївна Куришко; born 28 August 1988) is a Ukrainian politician who is currently the Presidential representative of Ukraine in Crimea since 24 January 2024.

She had been the Deputy Permanent Representative of the President of Ukraine in the Autonomous Republic of Crimea from 2023 to 2024.

== Biography ==
Kuryshko was born in Poltava on 28 August 1988.

In 2010, she graduated from the Yaroslav the Wise National Law Academy of Ukraine, receiving a diploma with honors in the specialty "Jurisprudence". In 2015, she received her second higher education in the degree of International Economics at the University of Economics and Trade.

From 2015 to 2016 she worked as a lawyer in a coalition of public organizations "Resource Center for Assistance to Forced Migrants", and later in the project "The House of Free People". During this period she was engaged in legal assistance to internally displaced persons, analysis of legislation and law initiatives. From 2016 to 2021 she was an expert on advocacy and deputy chairman of the board of the NGO "Crimea", where she was engaged in the provision of legal assistance, preparation of legal documents, analysis of legislation and organization of advocacy measures.

In 2021, she joined the President of Ukraine to the Autonomous Republic of Crimea, heading the legal support department. before formally taking office on 21 January 2025.

On 30 June 2023, Kuryshko was appointed Deputy of a permanent representative of Crimea.

On 5 December 2024, after Tamila Tasheva resigned to become a member of the Verkhovna Rada, she took over as acting representative. before formally taking office on 21 January 2025.
