= Mykola Hlushko =

- Микола Глушко

Presidential Representative to Sevastopol
- In office 19 January 1994 – July 1995
- Preceded by: Ivan Yermakov
- Succeeded by: Viktor Semenov

Personal details
- Born: Mykola Mykhailovych Hlushko; 1 May 1938 (age 87) Sevastopol, Crimea, Soviet Union

Mykola Mykhailovych Hlushko (Ukrainian: Микола Михайлович Глушко; born on 1 May 1938), is a Ukrainian politician who had served as Presidential Representative of Sevastopol from 1994 to 1995.

== Biography ==
Mykola Hlushko was born Sevastopol on 1 May 1938. He graduated from the Sevastopol Institute Institute in 1955, as a mechanical engineer. He attended the higher party school at the Central Committee of the Communist Party.

In 1953, he worked in the Soviet bodies. He worked as a secretary of the organizational and instructor department.

Between 1955 and 1973, he worked at the Sevastopol Marine Plant. S. Ordzhonikidze.

He joined the Communist Party of the Soviet Union in 1962.

From 1973 to 1975, he was the Head of the organizational and instructor department of the Sevastopol City Executive Committee.

From 1975 to 1990, he was the chairman of the executive committee of the Lenin district council of Sevastopol.

In March 1990, Hlushko was elected a member of the Sevastopol City Council.

From April 1990 to May 1992, he had been a Deputy Chairman of the Sevastopol City Council.

In June 1992, he was the Secretary of the City State Administration, then in 1993, he was promoted up to first Deputy Head of the Sevastopol City State Administration.

On 19 January 1994, Hluhshko became the acting Presidential Representative to Sevastopol, before formally taking office on 14 April.

He left office in July 1995.
