= Serhiy Ivanov =

Ukrainian politician

- Сергій Іванов
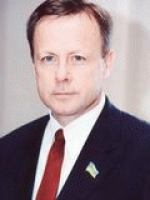
- Official portrait, 2002

Chairman of the Sevastopol City State Administration
- In office 4 February 2005 – 31 May 2006
- Preceded by: Leonid Zhunko
- Succeeded by: Serhiy Kunitsyn

People's Deputy of Ukraine
- In office 12 May 1998 – 7 July 2005
- Preceded by: Constituency established
- Succeeded by: Constituency abolished
- Constituency: Autonomous Republic of Crimea, No. 3

Personal details
- Born: 21 January 1952 (age 74) Tokmak, Ukrainian SSR, Soviet Union (now Ukraine)
- Party: Independent
- Education: Simferopol State University

Serhiy Anatoliiovych Ivanov (Ukrainian: Сергій Анатолійович Іванов; born 21 January 1952) is a Ukrainian politician.

In 2005-06 he served as a Chairman of the Sevastopol City State Administration. He had previously served as a People's Deputy of Ukraine in the Verkhovna Rada from 1998 to 2005.

== Early life ==
Ivanov was born on 21 January 1952 in Tokmak, which was then part of the Ukrainian SSR in the Soviet Union. He first graduated from Tokmak Mechanical College, and then worked at the Tokmak Diesel Plant named after S. Kirov and completed his mandatory military service in the Soviet Armed Forces. In 1977, he completed his degree to become a lawyer at Simferopol State University, and was then briefly a teacher before joining the Central District Department of Internal Affairs for Simferopol. By 1980, he had become Deputy Head of Criminal Investigation, before he switched to join the MIA Crimea Regional Executive Committee, first as an inspector. In 1982, he graduated from the Kyiv Higher School of the Ministry of Internal Affairs. By the collapse of the Soviet Union, he had become a Senior Commissioner for the Department for Combating Theft of Socialist Property.

After 1991, he continued to work in the now Autonomous Republic of Crimea in Ukraine. He worked within the Main Director of the MIA of Ukraine as the Head of the Department for Combating Organized Crime, and then from 1994 up until his election to the Rada he was Head of the Department for Combating Corruption and Crime in Crimea.

== Political career ==
In the 1998 Ukrainian parliamentary election, he was elected to the Verkhovna Rada representing electoral district No. 3 in AR Crimea. He served mainly within the committees for law enforcement activities, and represented Labour Ukraine from 1999 to 2002, United Ukraine in 2002, People's Power Party from 2002 to 2004, and then Our Ukraine from 2005. His powers were terminated when he became Chairman of the Sevastopol City State Administration from 2005 to 2006.

From 2004 to 2005, he served as the representative of Viktor Yushchenko for TEC no. 3. In the 2006 Ukrainian parliamentary election, he ran as a representative of Our Ukraine, but was not elected. He attempted to run again in the 2010 Ukrainian local elections representing the Republican Christian Party, but this time within the Vinnytsia Regional Council.
