= Natalia Popovych =

Ukrainian politician

Natalia Popovych Наталія Попович

Ukraine Presidential representative in Crimea
- In office 22 May 2014 – 17 August 2017
- Preceded by: Serhiy Kunitsyn
- Succeeded by: Borys Babin

Personal details
- Born: Natalia Kostiantynivna Popovych; 16 March 1968 (age 58) Gurzuf, Yalta municipality, Ukrainian SSR, Soviet Union (now Ukraine)

Natalia Kostiantynivna Popovych (Ukrainian: Наталія Костянтинівна Попович; born 16 March 1968, in Gurzuf, Yalta municipality, Ukrainian SSR) is a Ukrainian politician.

In 2014 she was appointed as the Presidential representative of Ukraine in Crimea that was shortly before that position was transferred to Kherson due to the annexation of Crimea by the Russian Federation.

== See also ==
- Artek (camp)
