= Yuriy Stupnikov =

Russian-Ukrainian politician (born 1942)

- Юрій Ступніков
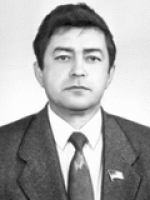

Member of the Verkhovna Rada
- In office 15 May 1990 – 10 May 1994

Chairman of the Sevastopol City Council
- In office April 1990 – 5 February 1991
- Succeeded by: Ivan Yermakov

Personal details
- Born: Yuriy Ivanovych Stupnikov; 12 March 1942 (age 84) Kamennomostsky, Russia, Soviet Union

Yuriy Ivanovych Stupnikov (Ukrainian: Юрій Іванович Ступніков; born on 12 March 1942), is a Russian-born Ukrainian politician who served as the Member of the Verkhovna Rada from 1990 to 1994.

He also served as the Chairman of the Sevastopol City Council from 1990 to 1991.

== Biography ==
Yuriy Stupnikov was born on 12 March 1942, in the village of Kamennomostsky, in Krasnodar Krai to family of workers.

He is an ethnic Russian. He graduated from the Sevastopol Instrument-Making Institute, as a shipbuilding engineer.

From 1960 to 1961, he worked as a mechanic at the Sergo Ordzhonikidze Marine Plant.

From 1961 to 1964, he served in the Soviet Army. In 1964, he worked in the positions of foreman, master, senior master, and section manager at the Marine Plant.

In 1973, he was an instructor of the industrial and transport department of the Sevastopol MK of the Communist Party of Ukraine, head of the industrial and transport department of the Gagarin RK of the Communist Party of Ukraine, Sevastopol CP of Ukraine.

In 1986, he was the 1st Secretary of the Nakhimov District Committee of the Communist Party of Ukraine in Sevastopol. In 1988, he was the 2nd Secretary of the Sevastopol City Committee of the Communist Party of Ukraine.

He had been the chief accountant of the scientific and production association "Musson". In 1990, Stupnikov became a member of the Sevastopol City Council. At the same time, he had been nominated as a candidate for people's deputy by the labor collective of the Sevastopol factory of knitted sportswear of the VO "Ukrpromdynamo".

On 18 March, Stupnikov was elected as a member of parliament, People's Deputy of Ukraine of the 1st convocation, in the 2nd round with 53.42% of the vote, 9 applicants. In 1988, we has the 2nd Secretary of the Sevastopol City Committee of the Communist Party of Ukraine.

In April, he became the Chairman of the Sevastopol City Council. He took office in the Verkhovna Rada on 15 May. He was a member of the Verkhovna Rada Commission on Planning, Budget, Finance and Prices.

In February 1991, Stupnikov resigned as chairman, and was replaced by Ivan Yermakov.

He left the parliament on 10 May 1994.

== Family ==
He is married and has children.
