= Borys Babin =

Ukrainian politician

Borys Babin Бабін Борис Володимирович
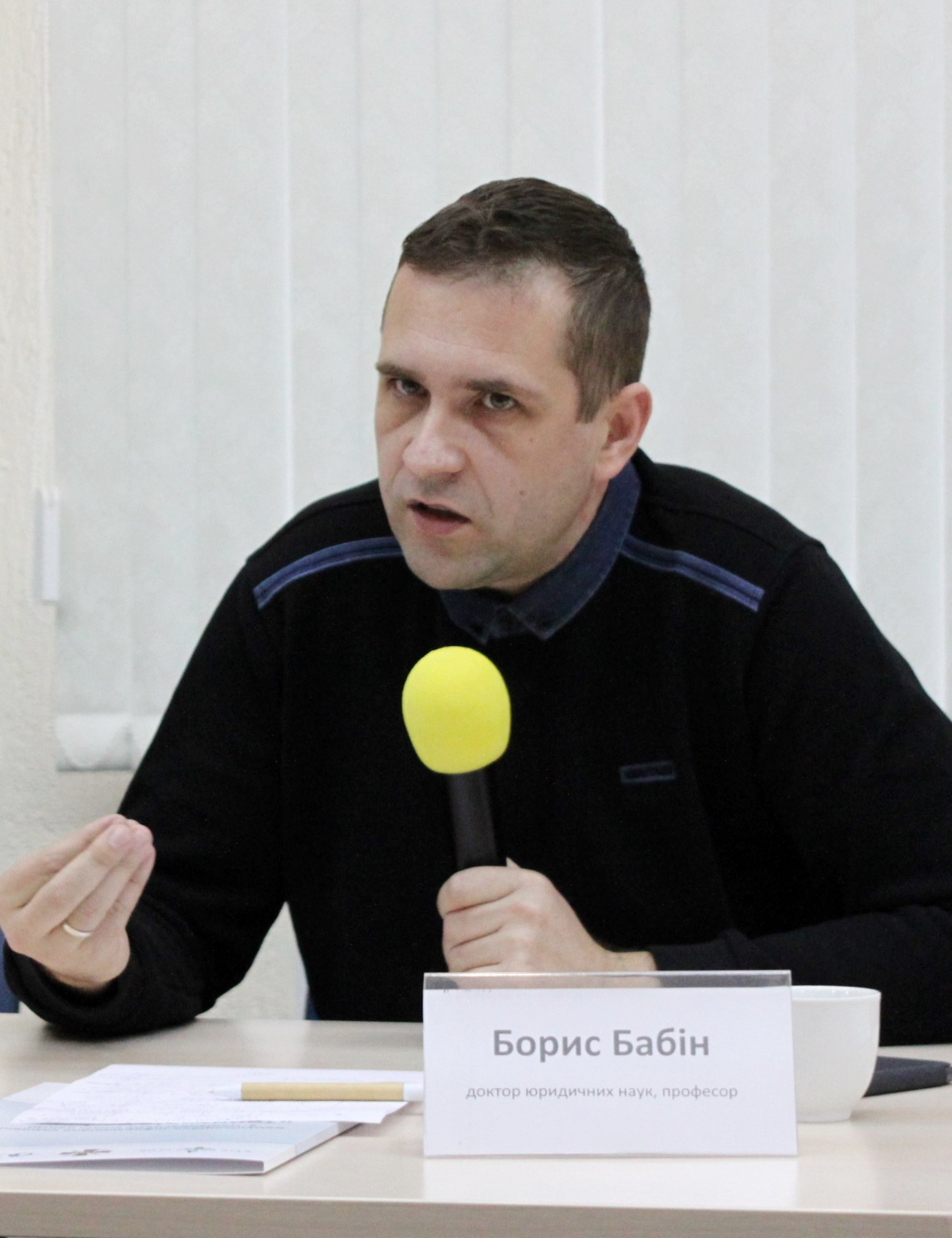
- December 2018

Ukraine Presidential representative in Crimea
- In office 17 August 2017 – 3 December 2018
- Preceded by: Natalia Popovych
- Succeeded by: Izet Hdanov (acting)

Personal details
- Born: Borys Volodymyrovyh Babin; 12 March 1981 (age 45) Yevpatoria, Ukrainian SSR

Borys Volodymyrovych Babin (Ukrainian: Бабін Борис Володимирович; born 12 March 1981, in Yevpatoria, Ukrainian SSR) is a Ukrainian politician. He is an ad hoc expert for OSCE, the Council of Europe, and Minority Rights Group International, as well as a Doctor of Laws and professor.

== Early life and teaching ==
Babin was born on 12 March 1981 in Yevpatoria, which was part of Crimea in the Ukrainian SSR at the time of his birth. He later received a Doctor of Laws. Afterwards, he headed the Department of Administrative and Criminal Law at the Odesa National Maritime Academy.

Since 2016, he has also served as a professor in the Department of International Law and Comparative Law of the International Humanities University (which is based in Odesa).

== Poolitical career ==
In 2014, Babin was appointed as the presidential representative of Ukraine in Crimea, then transferred to Kherson due to the annexation of Crimea by the Russian Federation. He was then the Government Commissioner for the European Court of Human Rights from June 2015 to December 2015.

He officially assumed office as the presidential representative of Ukraine in Crimea again on 17 August 2017. He resigned from the post on 3 December 2018.

He has since then served as Head of the Sector of the Institute of Legislation of the Verkhovna Rada of Ukraine.
