= Anton Korynevych =

Ukrainian politician

Anton Korynevych Антон Олександрович Кориневич
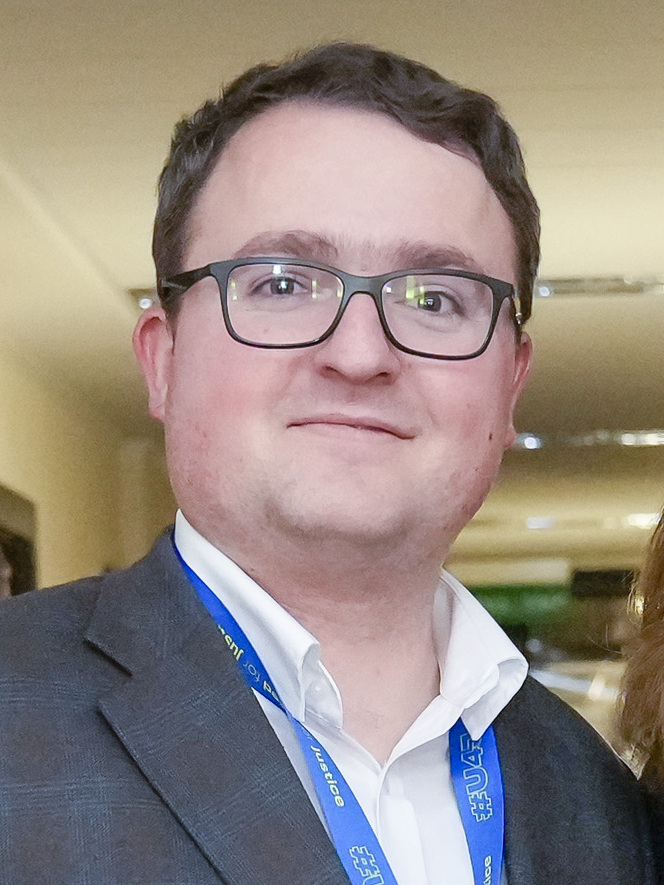
- Anton Korynevych in November, 2019

Permanent Representative of the President of Ukraine in the Autonomous Republic of Crimea
- In office 25 June 2019 – 25 April 2022
- President: Volodymyr Zelenskyy
- Preceded by: Izet Hdanov
- Succeeded by: Tamila Tasheva

Personal details
- Born: 13 February 1986 (age 40) Kyiv, Soviet Union
- Education: Taras Shevchenko National University of Kyiv

Anton Olexandrovych Korynevych (Ukrainian: Антон Олександрович Кориневич; born 13 February 1986) is a Ukrainian politician. He is a specialist in international humanitarian law, international criminal law, and international energy law.

== Biography ==
He was born on 13 February 1986 in Kyiv, which was then part of the Ukrainian SSR in the Soviet Union.

He graduated from the Institute of International Relations at Taras Shevchenko National University of Kyiv in 2009, receiving the degree of international law and translator into English. In 2011, he became an associate professor at the Institute of International Relations under the Department of International Law. He also defended his dissertation on 23 May that same year to receive the degree of Candidate of Legal Sciences in international law.

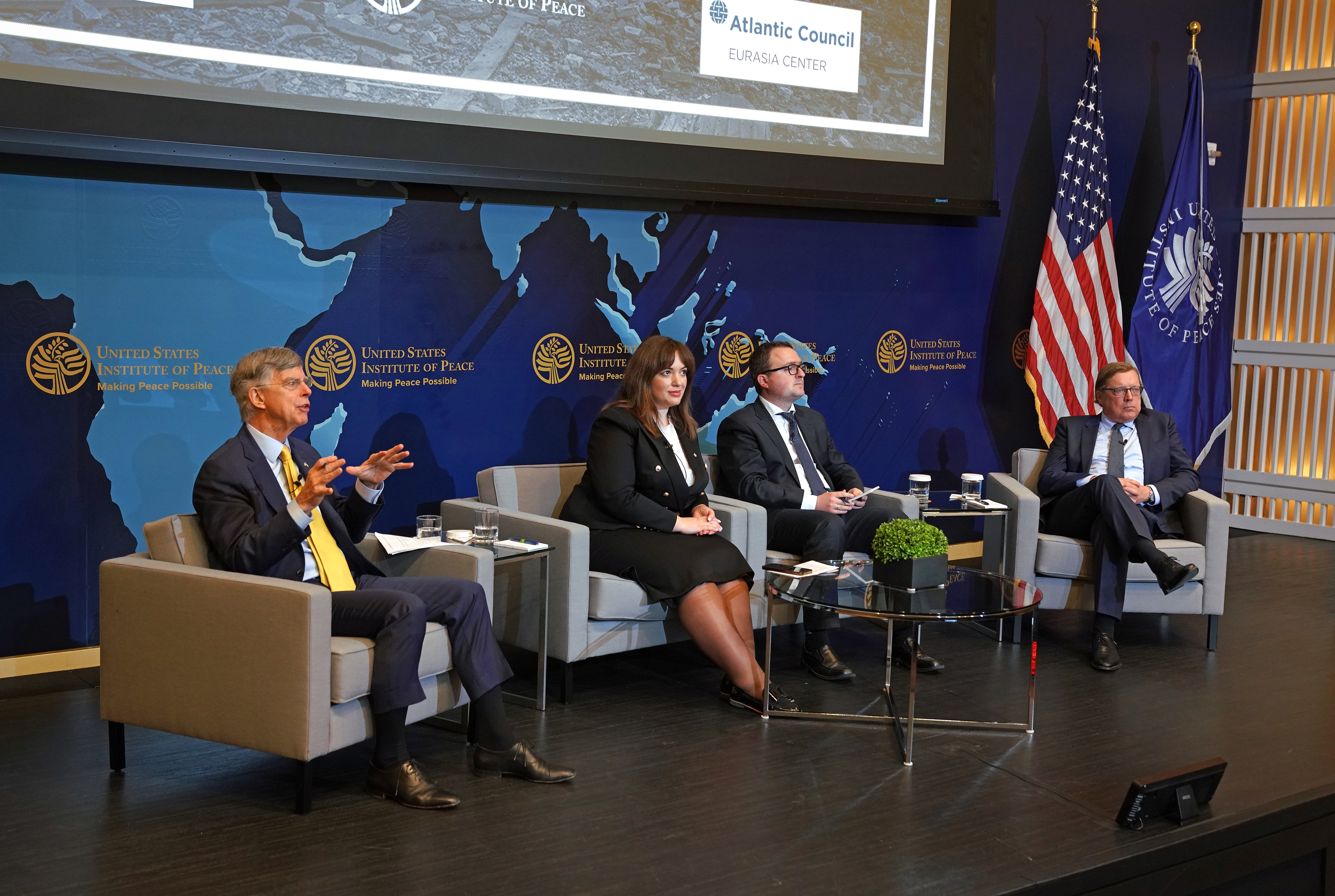
William B. Taylor Jr., Lesya Zaburanna, Korynevych and war crimes expert David Scheffer at a meeting about Prosecuting the Crime of Aggression in Ukraine in 2022

In 2012, he was promoted as the academic secretary of the Special Academic Council of the University of Kyiv. He worked as a deputy director of scientific and pedagogical work, and as an associate professor of the Institute of International Relations.

On June 25, 2019, he was appointed presidential representative of Ukraine in Crimea. During his time in that position, he stated in an interview that Ukraine was not currently ready for the return of Crimea, even if Russia were to withdraw suddenly, as significant work needed to be done for prior reintegration. He was also appointed to be a member of the Working Group on Reintegration of the Temporarily Occupied Territories of the Commission on Legal Reform. He was replaced by Tamila Tasheva on April 25, 2022.

Since leaving that position, he has served as Ambassador-at-Large of the Ministry of Foreign Affairs. In this role, he stated he is preparing to create a special tribunal for the crime of Russia's aggression following the Russian invasion of Ukraine.

== Awards ==
- Order of Merit, 3rd class (2025).
