= Mykola Shvets =

Ukrainian politician (born 1955)

- Микола Швець
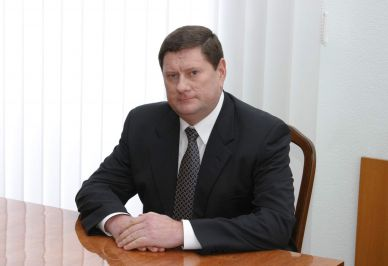

Chairman of the Dnipropetrovsk Oblast Council
- In office December 13, 2004 – April 2006
- Preceded by: Halyna Bulavka
- Succeeded by: Yuriy Vilkul

Governor of Dnipropetrovsk Oblast
- In office April 27, 1999 – July 30, 2003
- President: Leonid Kravchuk
- Preceded by: Oleksandr Migdeyev
- Succeeded by: Volodymyr Yatsuba

Mayor of Dnipropetrovsk
- In office 1994–1999
- Preceded by: Victor Merkushov
- Succeeded by: Ivan Kulichenko

Personal details
- Born: September 6, 1955 (age 70) Piatykhatky

Mykola Antonovych Shvets (Ukrainian: Микола Антонович Швець; born September 6, 1955) is a Ukrainian politician. He served as Mayor of Dnipropetrovsk from 1994 to 1999, Governor of Dnipropetrovsk Oblast from 1999 to 2003, and Chairman of the Dnipropetrovsk Oblast Council from 2004 to 2006.

== Early life ==
Shvets was born on September 6, 1955, in Piatykhatky, which was thhen part of the Ukrainian SSR in the Soviet Union. He first graduated from the Prydniprovska State Academy of Civil Engineering and Architecture while simultaneously served in the Soviet Armed Forces to complete his mandatory conscription. Afterwords, he worked as an engineer-builder for the regional construction association, before deciding to enter politics and studying at the Higher Party School of the Central Committee of the Communist Party of Ukraine, which he graduated from in 1987.

== Political career ==
He first served in politics from 1987 to 1989 as an organizational instructor of the executive committee of the Dnipropetrovsk Oblast Council of People's Deputies. Afterwords, he worked his way, prior to the collapse of the Soviet Union, to first deputy head of the executive committee of the Babushkinsky District of Dnipropetrovsk. Following its fall, he served as Deputy Head of the executive committee of the Dnipropetrovsk City Council. From 1994 to 1999, he was then Mayor of Dnipro. From 1999 to August 2003 he was the head of the Dnipropetrovsk Regional State Administration, appointed by decree of the President of Ukraine dated April 27, 1999.

He then served as an advisor to the President of Ukraine and Head of the Dnipropetrovsk Oblast Council.

Preceded by Oleksandr Migdeyev	Governor of Dnipropetrovsk Oblast; 1999–2003	Succeeded by Volodymyr Yatsuba
