= Lesya Zaburanna =

Member of the Parliament of Ukraine

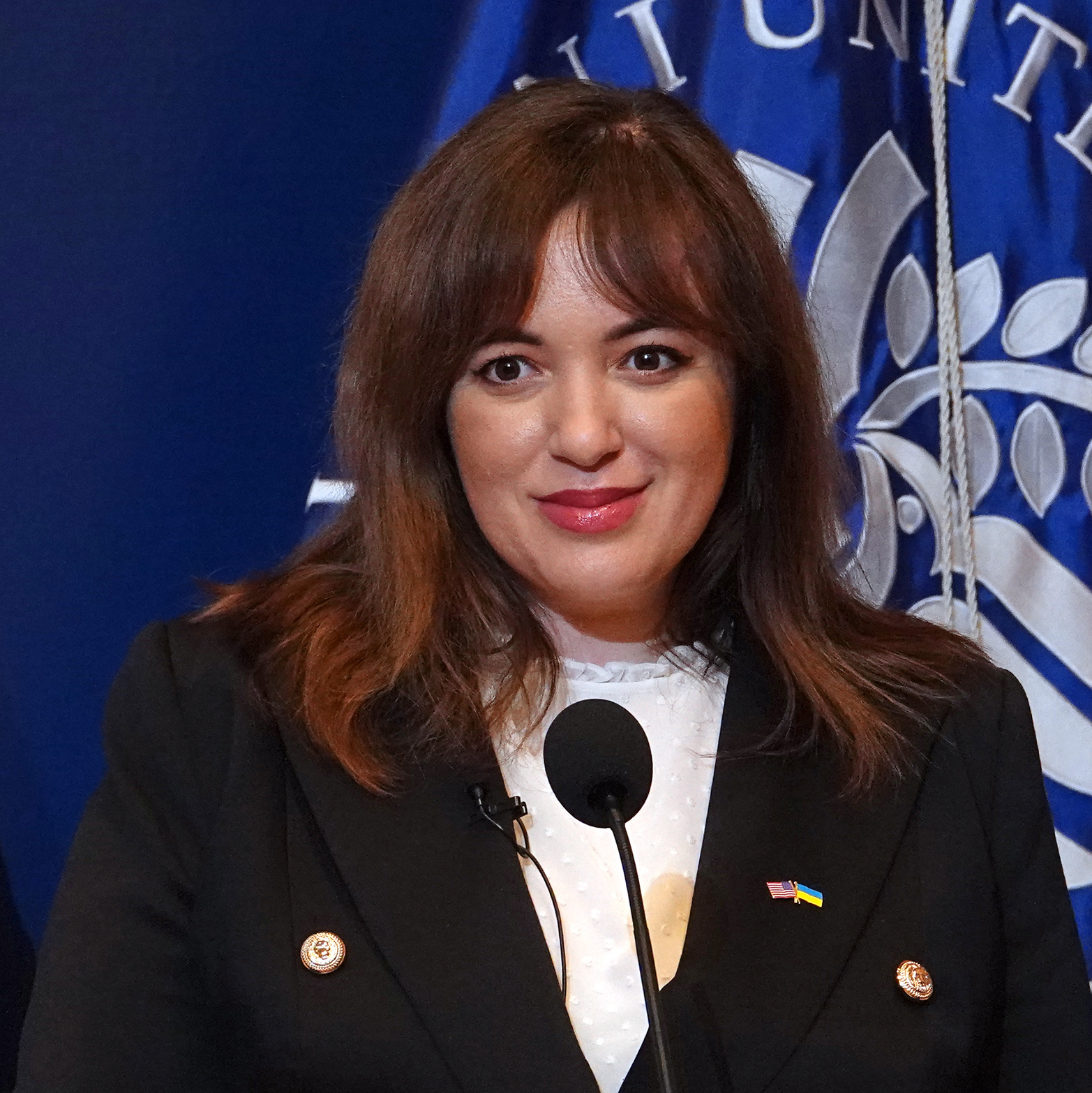
- in 2022
- Born: 22 August 1981 (age 45); Kyiv
- Occupation: Politician
- Known for: Member of parliament
- Political party: Servant of the People

Lesya Zaburanna (born 22 August 1981) is a member of the parliament of Ukraine (Verkhovna Rada). She is the Chair of the Subcommittee on Public Expenditures.

== Life ==
Zaburanna was born in Kyiv in 1981. She graduated from the Kyiv National University of Trade and Economics, majoring in enterprise economics.

After graduating Zaburanna took internships in Europe and in North America. She researched the socio-economic development of depressed areas and gender equality in Ukraine. She is a member of the Association for the Promotion of Rural Green Tourism Development in Ukraine and an Expert of the Scientific Expert Council of the Ministry of Agrarian Policy and Food of Ukraine.

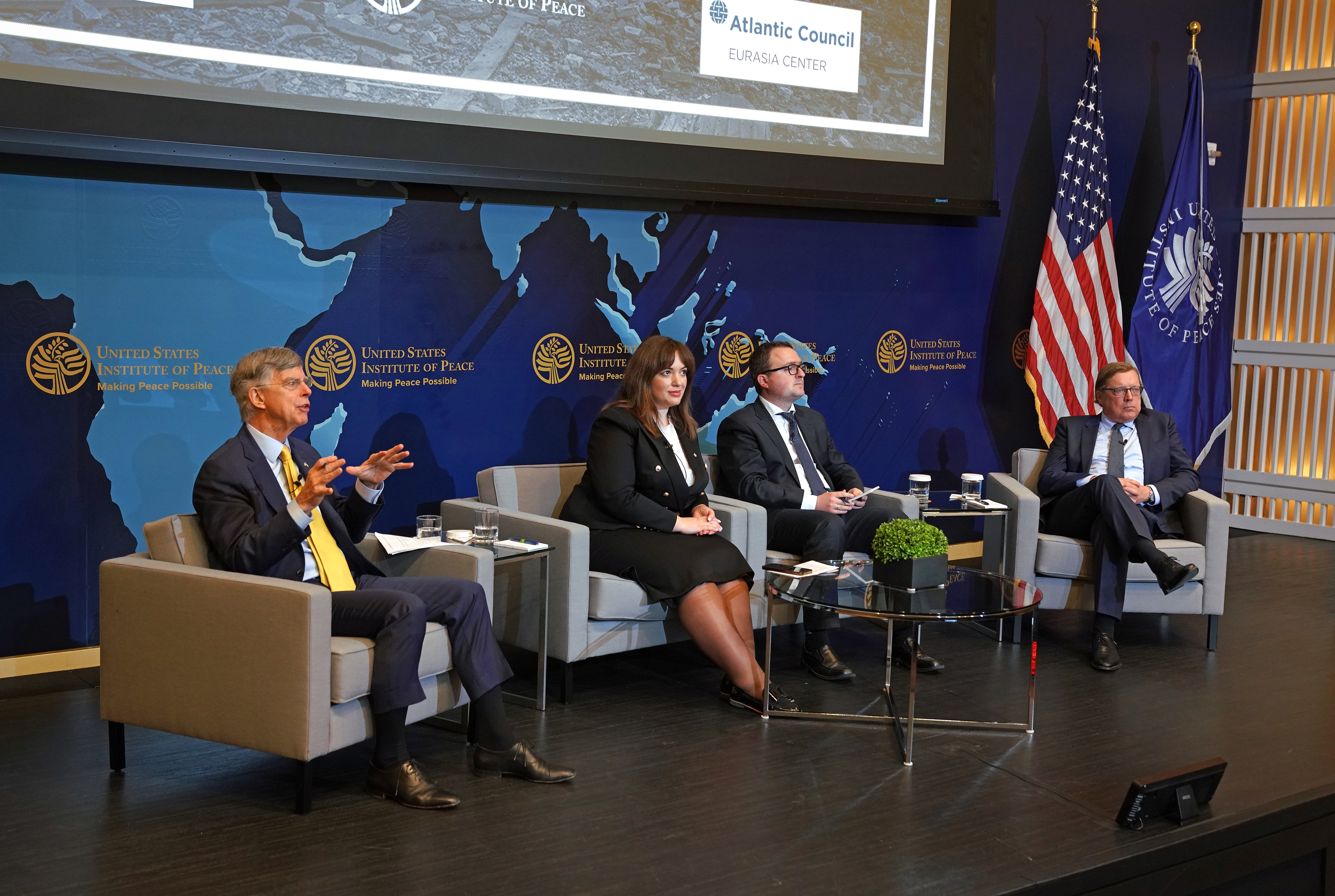
December 2022 William B. Taylor Jr., Lesya Zaburanna, Anton Korynevych and war crimes expert David Scheffer at a meeting about Prosecuting the Crime of Aggression in Ukraine

She was the Y. S. Zavadsky professor of the department of management at the National University of Bioresources and Nature Management of Ukraine when she was a candidate for People's Deputies from the Servant of the People party in the parliamentary elections in 2019 (election district number 216, part of the Dniprovskyi District, Kyiv). She is the Chair of the Subcommittee on Public Expenditures.

She sits on the Verkhovna Rada Committee on Budget and she chairs the Subcommittee on State Budget Expenditures. She is a Member of the Permanent Delegation to the Parliamentary Assembly of the Council of Europe and co-chair of the group on inter-parliamentary relations with Canada.

In December 2002 she was at a meeting in America where the possibility of prosecuting a "Crime of Aggression" under international law was discussed. This followed the creation of a list of "atrocity crimes" following Russia's invasion of Ukraine in February 2022.
