= Volodymyr Yatsuba =

Ukrainian politician

- Володимир Яцуба
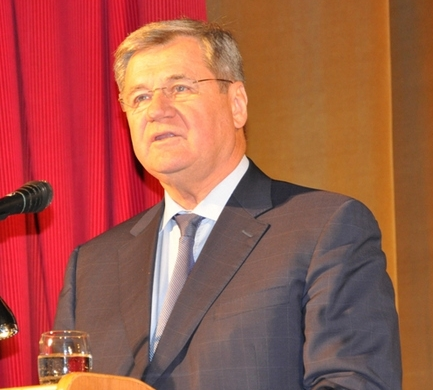
- Yatsuba in 2013

Governor of Sevastopol
- In office 7 June 2011 – 7 March 2014
- Preceded by: Valeriy Saratov
- Succeeded by: Fedir Rubanov (acting) (de jure); Dmitry Belik (acting) (de facto); Aleksei Chaly (de facto)

Representatives of the President of Ukraine in Crimea
- In office 2011 – 7 June 2011
- Preceded by: Viktor Plakida
- Succeeded by: Viktor Plakida

Minister of Regional Development and Construction
- In office 11 March 2010 – 9 December 2010
- Preceded by: Vasyl Kuybida
- Succeeded by: Viktor Tykhonov
- In office 21 March 2007 – 18 December 2007
- Preceded by: Volodymyr Rybak
- Succeeded by: Vasyl Kuybida

Member of the Verkhovna Rada
- In office 23 November 2007 – 11 March 2010

Governor of Dnipropetrovsk Oblast
- In office 30 July 2003 – 30 December 2004
- Preceded by: Mykola Shvets
- Succeeded by: Volodymyr Meleshchyk (acting)

State Secretary of Cabinet of Ukraine
- In office 2001 – 30 July 2003
- Preceded by: Viktor Lisytsky
- Succeeded by: Anatoliy Tolstoukhov

Member of the Verkhovna Rada
- In office 15 May 1990 – 10 May 1994

Personal details
- Born: Volodymyr Hryhorovych Yatsuba; 1 July 1947 (age 78) Dnipropetrovsk, Ukrainian SSR, Soviet Union
- Party: Party of Regions
- Children: 4

Volodymyr Hryhorovych Yatsuba (Ukrainian: Володимир Григорович Яцуба; born 1 July 1947) is a Ukrainian politician who served as Governor of Sevastopol from 2011 to 2014.

Preceded by Viktor Lisytsky	Minister of Cabinet of Ukraine (until 2003 State secretary of Cabinet of Ukraine); 2001–2003	Succeeded by Anatoliy Tolstoukhov
Preceded by Mykola Shvets	Governor of Dnipropetrovsk Oblast; 2003–2004	Succeeded by Volodymyr Meleshchyk (acting)
Preceded by Volodymyr Rybak (as Vice-Prime Minister)	Minister of Regional Development and Construction; 2007	Succeeded by Vasyl Kuybida
Preceded by Vasyl Kuibida	Minister of Regional Development and Construction; 2010	Succeeded by Anatoliy Blyznyuk (as Minister of Regional Development, Construction, and Communal Living)
Preceded by Viktor Plakida	Presidential representative of Ukraine in Crimea; 2011	Succeeded by Viktor Plakida
Preceded by Valeriy Saratov	Governor of Sevastopol; 2011–2014	Succeeded by Aleksei Chaly (de facto)
