= Borys Kucher =

Russian-born Ukrainian politician

- Борис Кучер

Mayor of Sevastopol
- In office 24 April 1998 – 5 April 1999
- Preceded by: Viktor Semenov
- Succeeded by: Leonid Zhunko

Personal details
- Born: Borys Oleksandrovych Kucher; 28 January 1942 Chelyabinsk, Russia, Soviet Union
- Died: 5 April 1999 (aged 57) Sevastopol, Ukraine

Borys Oleksandrovych Kucher (Ukrainian: Борис Олександрович Кучер; 28 January 1942 - 5 April 1999), was a Russian-born Ukrainian politician who served as the Mayor of Sevastopol from 1998 until his death in 1999.

He was a corresponding Member of the International Academy of Organizational and Management Sciences.

== Biography ==
Borys Kucher was born in Chelyabinsk on 28 January 1942. After graduating from the Kharkov College of Road Transport in 1961, he served in the Soviet Army. He took part in the events of the Cuban Missile Crisis in 1962.

In 1964, after returning to the Soviet Union and leaving the army, he worked until 1977 in the Kharkiv defense enterprise. He went from equipment to the deputy chief of the workshop. For his success in work in 1975 he was awarded to take a picture of the victory flag, for four years he was the winner of the socialist competition.

In 1971, he graduated from the Ukrainian Correspondence Polytechnic Institute and the Kharkiv Engineering and Economic Institute in 1983.

Since 1977, Kucher lived in Sevastopol. From 1978 to 1994 he headed the Crimean Electric Repair Plant of the Production Association "Ukrainian Electro Management". He was elected a deputy of the Gagarin district council.

In 1994, he worked in the authorities of Sevastopol, first as the first deputy chairman of the City Council for Executive Work, then in November 1995, appointed the first deputy head of the city state administration.

In January 1997, he was the head the State Tax Administration in Sevastopol.

On 24 April 1998, Kucher was appointed chairman of the Sevastopol City State Administration.

When interviewing the population of Sevastopol in 1998, he was nominated the "Man of the Year", "Politician of the Year" and "Businesser of the Year", and took first place.

Kucher died after a serious illness on 5 April 1999, at age 57. He was buried in Sevastopol at the Communards Cemetery.

== Distinctions ==
He was an honored Machine Builder of Ukraine. He was awarded the Order of Honor, Honorary Certificate of the State Tax Administration of Ukraine and other awards.

== Honoring memory ==
The name of the head of the city is named School No. 23 in the Gagarin district. It opens a museum, a granite annotation plaque is installed on the facade. On the building of the city tax administration and at the plant where Kucher (modern Ketz "Saturn") was installed memorial plaques.
