= Anatoliy Korniychuk =

Ukrainian politician

- Анатолій Корнійчук

Minister of Agrarian Policy of the Autonomous Republic of Crimea
- In office 17 March 2010 – 16 November 2010
- Preceded by: Pavlo Akymov
- Succeeded by: Oleh Farin

Presidential representative of Ukraine in Crimea
- In office 29 June 1999 – 9 January 2002
- Preceded by: Vasyl Kiselov
- Succeeded by: Oleksandr Didenko

Personal details
- Born: Anatoliy Vasylovych Koriychuk; 9 May 1957 (age 69) Bobrytsiya, Ukrainian SSR, Soviet Union (now Ukraine)
- Party: People's Party

Anatoliy Vasylovych Koriychuk (Ukrainian: Анатолій Васильович Корнійчук; born on 9 May 1957), is a Ukrainian politician who had served as the Presidential representative of Ukraine in Crimea from 1999 to 2002.

He is a candidate of Agricultural Sciences.

== Biography ==
Anatoliy Korniychuk was born on 9 May 1957 in Bobrytsiya in Zhytomyr Oblast. He graduated from the Crimean Agricultural Institute in 1980.

From 1980 to 1982, he was the senior agronomist of the Pervomaisky District Department of Agriculture.

In 1982, he was an instructor of the organizational department of the Pervomaysky District Committee of the Communist Party of Ukraine, and was the acting deputy editor of the district newspaper, deputy chairman, chairman of the Pervomaisky District Executive Committee. He attended the Higher Party School of the Central Committee of the Communist Party of Ukraine in 1989.

From 1990 to 1994, he was a deputy of the district council.

In 1995, Korniychuk was appointed as the Head of the Pervomaisky District State Administration.

On 4 November 1998, he became the Deputy Chairman of the Council of Ministers of the Autonomous Republic of Crimea.

On 29 June 1999, Koriychuk became the Presidential representative of Ukraine in Crimea.

On 17 May 2002, he was dismissed, and was replaced by Oleksandr Didenko.

He had been a member of the Verkhovna Rada of Crimea of the 2nd and 3rd Convocations convocation. He was the Head of the Crimean Republican Organization of the Agrarian Party of Ukraine from 1998.

On 17 March 2010, he served as Minister of Agrarian Policy of the Autonomous Republic of Crimea. On 16 November, he was replaced by Oleh Farin.

== Personal life ==
He likes football and goes out hunting.

He is married to Valentyna Mikoayiyvna, and has a son Oleksandr whom they live in Crimea since 1964.

He lives in Simferopol.
