= Oleksandr Didenko =

Ukrainian politician

- Олександр Діденко

First Deputy Minister of Economy and European Integration of Ukraine
- In office 30 December 2004 – 15 April 2005

Presidential Representative of Ukraine in Crimea
- In office 9 January 2002 – 30 December 2004
- Preceded by: Anatoliy Korniychuk
- Succeeded by: Volodymyr Kulish

Personal details
- Born: Oleksandr Mykolayovychh Didenko; 5 May 1949 (age 77) Rulykiv, Ukrainian SSR, Soviet Union (now Ukraine)

Oleksandr Mykolaiovych Didenko (Ukrainian: Олександр Миколайович Діденко; born on 5 May 1949), is a Ukrainian statesman and politician who last served as the First Deputy Minister of Economy and European Integration of Ukraine from 2004 to 2005.

He also served as the Presidential Representative of Ukraine in Crimea from 2002 to 2004.

He is an honored Economist of Ukraine as of 2004. He is a candidate of Economic Sciences.

He had been the Head of the Secretariat and Member of the Presidium of the Labour Ukraine Party and the First Deputy Chairman of the Power and Honor NGO.

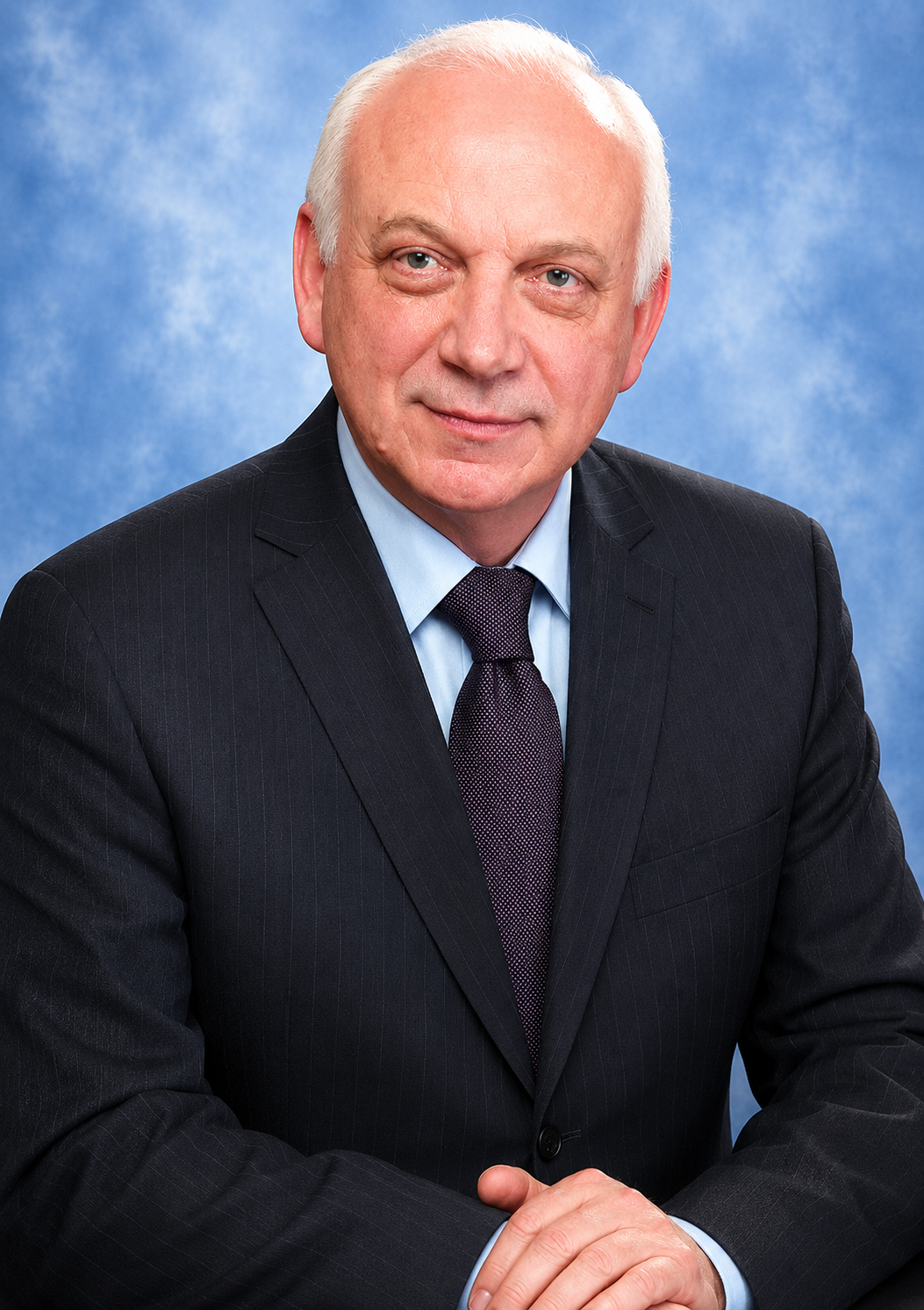

== Biography ==
Oleksandr Didenko was born on 5 May 1949, in Rulykiv, Vasylkiv district, Kyiv region.

Between 1976 and 1983, he was the Head of the Department, Deputy Secretary of the State Power Committee of Ukraine.

In 1977, he graduated from Kyiv State University. TG Shevchenko.

From 1983 to 1984, he was the Director of the Kiev Branch of the All -Union Institute of State Supply of the USSR.

From 1984 to 1991, he was an instructor, consultant of the Central Committee of the Communist Party of Ukraine.

From 1991 to 1996, he was a Deputy Director of the Ukrainian Branch of the International Center for Scientific Culture "World Laboratory", and was the Director of the Scientific Institution.

From 1996 to 2002, Head of the Department, Deputy Head of the Main Department of Organizational and Personal Work and Interaction with the Regions of Ukraine of the Presidential Administration of Ukraine.

On 26 June 2002, Didenko became the Presidential Representative of Ukraine in Crimea.

On 30 December 2004, he left office as he was appointed as the First Deputy Minister of Economy and European Integration of Ukraine.

On 15 April 2005, Didenko left as First Deputy Minister. Then until 2006, he was the head of the Secretariat, a member of the Presidium of the Labor Ukraine Party.

Ukrainian politician.

In 2005–2006 — Head of the Secretariat and Member of the Presidium of the Labour Ukraine Party.

He is the first deputy chairman of the NGO "Power and Honor".

It has a number of publications on the problems of small business development. He worked fruitfully on draft documents on the administrative and territorial structure of Ukraine and the reorganization of public administration and local self-government bodies.

Didenko ran as a candidate from Power and Honor Party in the 2019 parliamentary elections, No. 29 in the list.

He currently lives in Kyiv.

Married. Has two sons.

Father of Yaroslav Didenko, a Ukrainian politician and human rights advocate, a member of the Kyiv City Council of the 7th and 8th convocations, and Chairman of the public movement "KYIANY RAZOM“ (KYIVANS TOGETHER) https://kmr.gov.ua/profiles/didenko-yaroslav-oleksandrovich
