= Representatives of the President of Ukraine =

Representatives of the President of Ukraine (Ukrainian: Представники Президента України [predstɐu̯nɪˈkɪ prezɪˈdɛntɐ ʊkrɐˈjinɪ]) are five chief offices that are directed by a presidential representative. Given that the President of Ukraine is head of state, the President faces the need to represent his/her interests in different political and judicial bodies of power in the country.

== List of representatives ==
- the Presidential representative of Ukraine in Crimea
- the Constitutional Court of Ukraine
- the Verkhovna Rada (parliament)
- the Cabinet of Ministers of Ukraine
- the Chernobyl Nuclear Power Plant
