= Viktor Semenov =

- Віктор Семенов

Mayor of Sevastopol
- In office July 1995 – 24 April 1998
- Preceded by: Mykola Hlushko
- Succeeded by: Borys Kucher

Personal details
- Born: Viktor Mykhailoych Semenov; 3 February 1946 (age 80) Vladivostok, Russia, Soviet Union

Viktor Mykhailoych Semenov (Ukrainian: Віктор Михайлович Семенов; born on 3 February 1946), is a Russian-born Ukrainian statesman, diplomat, and scientist who served as the Mayor of Sevastopol from 1995 to 1998.

He is a candidate of Technical Sciences in 1993.

== Biography ==
Viktor Semenov was born on 6 February 1946 in Vladivostok to his father Mikhail Mikhailovich (1916–1997), and his mother, Tatiana Georgievna (1925) who is a pensioner, disabled of the Great Patriotic War. He is an ethnic Russian.

From September 1969 to June 1970, he was a Mechanical Physician, Kharkov Institute of Radio Physics.

In 1970, he graduated from Kharkiv State University with a degree in radiophysicist.

From September 1970 to March 1973, he was an engineer, then promoted to senior engineer of the Kharkov Engineering Institute. From April 1973 to September 1974, he worked at the Sevastopol Trolleybus Administration Engineer.

In September 1974, he was an Assistant, senior teacher of the Department of Physics, since February 1986 - Chairman of the Trade Union of the Sevastopol Instrument -Building Institute.

In May 1992, he was the Chairman of the Sevastopol City Council of People's Deputies. At the same time, from June 1994 to July 1995, he headed the executive committee of the Sevastopol City Council.

In July 1994, he was a member of the Council of Heads of Border Regions of Ukraine and Russia.

In July 1995, Stepanov became the Mayor of Sevastopol. And in December 1995, he had been a Member of the Commission on Marine Policy under the President of Ukraine.

Between October 1997 and September 1998, he was the chairman of the subcommittee on the stay of the Black Sea Fleet in the territory of Ukraine of a mixed Ukrainian-Russian commission for cooperation. He left office as mayor in April 1998. At the same month, he was the chief adviser to the group of ambassadors on special orders and chief advisers of the Foreign Ministry of Ukraine.

In September 1998, he became a Consul General of Ukraine in St. Petersburg.

In March 2004, he served as an ambassador an Ambassador on special instructions of the Ministry of Foreign Affairs, and Deputy Chairman of the Ukrainian Part of the Subcommittee on the Black Sea Fleet.

From September 2015 to October 2019, he was an Advisor to the NSDC Deputy Secretary on a public basis.

== Family ==
He is married to Svitlana Andriyivna (born in 1954). The couple has two children, daughter Viktoriya (born in 1954), and son Viktor (born in 1981)
