= Valeriy Saratov =

Soviet politician (1953–2015)

Valerii Saratov
- Валерій Саратов

Chairperson of the Sevastopol City State Administration
- In office 6 April 2010 – 1 June 2011
- Preceded by: Serhiy Kunitsyn
- Succeeded by: Volodymyr Yatsuba

Personal details
- Born: Valery Vladimirovich Saratov; 31 July 1953 Roshal, Moscow Oblast, Russian SFSR, Soviet Union
- Died: 9 December 2015 (aged 62) Moscow, Russian Federation
- Party: Party of Regions
- Children: Irina, Yelena

Valerii Volodymyrovych Saratov (Ukrainian: Валерій Володимирович Саратов) (31 July 1953 - 9 December 2015), was a Russian and formerly Ukrainian politician who served as Chairperson of the Sevastopol City State Administration from 2010 to 2011 as a member of the Party of Regions. In 2014, he publicly expressed support for the Russian annexation of Crimea.

== Early life ==
Saratov was born on 31 July 1953 in the town of Roshal, which was then part of the Russian SFSR in the Soviet Union. In 1975, he graduated from the Sevastopol Instrument‑Making Institute with a specialty in automation and telemechanics. After graduating, he started working as an engineer in the city of Kharkiv, before becoming an energy specialist for a plant in Prokopyevsk. He then returned to Sevastopol to work at the plant "Sail", where he worked his way up until 1985 to become head of the workshop. His final position before transitioning into politics was as Secretary of the Party Committee of the Sevastopol plant "Parus".

== Political career ==
In 1988, he was appointed Second Secretary of the Nakhimov District Committee within the city of Sevastopol. He was then appointed Deputy Chairman of the Sevastopol City Executive Committee in August 1990. Following the collapse of the Soviet Union, he worked in the private sector until 1999 as president of the corporation "Morion". He returned to politics in 1999 when he became Head of the Balaklava District of Sevastopol, which he did until 2002. He was then appointed Head of the State Tax Administration of Sevastopol from 2002 to 2005, and also briefly was head of the Party of Regions branch for Sevastopol. In 2006, he served as Chairman of the Sevastopol City Council, and up until his election as chairman he served in this position.

From 2010 to 2011 he served as a Chairperson of the Sevastopol City State Administration. During the referendum on the status of Crimea in the midst of the Russian annexation of Crimea after Euromaidan, he called for voting in favor of joining Russia. He was put on the wanted list on suspicion of treason. He was subsequently dismissed from the civil service registry of Ukraine by the Order of the Cabinet of Ministers of Ukraine No. 307 of April 5, 2014.

He died in Moscow on December 9, 2015.
