= Ivan Yermakov =

Ukrainian politician

- Іван Єрмаков

Presidential Representative to Sevastopol
- In office 25 March 1991 – 19 January 1994
- Preceded by: Arkadii Shestakov
- Succeeded by: Mykola Hlushko (acting)

Personal details
- Born: Ivan Fedosovych Yermakov; 1 January 1947 (age 79) Pokrovka, Belarus, Soviet Union
- Party: Ukraine – Forward! Strong Ukraine

Colonel Ivan Fedosovych Yermakov (Ukrainian: Іван Федосович Єрмаков; born on 1 January 1947), is a Belarusian-born Ukrainian politician and former army officer, who served as the chairman of the Sevastopol City State Administration, serving from 1992 to 1994. He also served as the deputy chairman of the Verkhovna Rada of the Crimea at the same time from 1991 to 1994.

== Biography ==
Yermakov was in born Pokrovka, Belarus, on 1 January 1947.

After graduating from high school in 1964, he entered the Sevastopol instrument-making institute.

In 1969, he graduated from the Sevastopol Instrument-Making Institute. In 1969 to 1971, he was a designer of the branch of the central design bureau "Proletarsky Plant" in Sevastopol.

In 1971, he graduated from the Sevastopol Instrumentation Institute. In the same year, as a reserve officer, he was drafted into the aviation of the Soviet Navy until 1972.

From 1972 to 1976, he studied at the Air Force Engineering Academy, which he graduated with honors.

From 1976 to 1985, he worked as a chief engineer at the Sevastopol Aviation Enterprise.

From 1985 to 1991, he worked as a director of the Sevastopol Aviation Enterprise.

On 5 February 1991, Yermakov was elected chairman of the Sevastopol Council and executive committee.

In March 1992, in connection with the reorganization of the state executive power, Yermakov was appointed the head of the city state administration, however, at the same time, he lost the position of the head of the city council.

On 19 January 1994, Yermakov was removed as the head of the city state administration. In May 1994, also resigned as the deputy chairman of the Verkhovna Rada of the Autonomous Republic of Crimea, a position he held since May 1991.

From May 1994 to 1996, he was the deputy chairman of the Board of the Crimean Commercial Church Bank.

Since 2002, he was the Director of Development and Marketing of Yug-Telecom LLC.

From 2004 to 2006, he was at the Ministry of Defense of Ukraine, and was in the leadership of the central office.

== Social activities ==
He was the chairman of the public movement "Union - Prosperity in Unity" since 1994.

He was a member of the Labor Ukraine Party, and joined the Strong Ukraine party in 2009 and was the, chairman of the Sevastopol city organization of the party until 2010.

Since 2014, he was the chairman of the regional branch of the Patriots of Russia party in Sevastopol.

In 2016, he was nominated for the State Duma of the 7th convocation.

In 2017, he ran as a candidate for governor of Sevastopol.

He is a member of the Union of Journalists of Russia.

== Family ==
He is married to his wife, Olha Volodymyrivna, who is of Russian descent, and has two sons, Oleksandr and Denys.
