= Fedir Rubanov =

Ukrainian politician

- Федір Рубанов

Head of Sevastopol (acting)
- In office 24 February 2014 – 4 March 2014
- Preceded by: Volodymyr Yatsuba
- Succeeded by: Dmitry Belik (acting) (de facto)

Personal details
- Born: Fedir Fedorovych Rubanov; 14 March 1971 (age 55) Sevastopol, Soviet Union
- Party: Party of Regions

Fedir Fedorovych Rubanov (Ukrainian: Федір Федорович Рубанов; born on 14 March 1971), is a Ukrainian politician who had served as the acting Head of Sevastopol in 2014.

He is a member of the Party of Regions.

== Biography ==
Fedir Rubanov was born in Sevastopol on 14 March 1971.

He graduated from the Faculty of Operation of Electrical Equipment and Automation of Vessels of the Sevastopol State Technical University with the qualification of "Electrical Engineer" in 1996.

He began his career as an electromechanic in military unit No. 72044. From 1996 to 2008, he worked in various positions at the Balaklava shipyard “Metallist”, associated with the Ministry of Defense of Ukraine. Then, for three years, he was the director of that plant.

He was a deputy of the Balaklava District Council of the IV and V convocations. On September 1, 2011, he was appointed chairman of the Balaklava regional state administration. In the 2012 parliamentary elections, he ran on the lists of the Party of Regions under No. 205, but did not get into the Verkhovna Rada.

In May 2013, after the resignation of Serhiy Savenkov, Rubanov was appointed First Deputy of the Sevastopol City State Administration, headed by Volodymyr Yatsuba. He was also the head of the Sevastopol branch of the Party of Regions.

On 24 February 2014, Yatsuba resigned, and Rubanov became the acting head of Sevastopol. On the same day, according to local politicians Mikhaylo Chaly and Volodymyr Tyunin, Rubanov initiated the arrest of the “people's mayor” of Sevastopol Alexei Chaly due to the seizure of power in the city. On the same day, after negotiations with the townspeople, Rubanov promised to transfer the case to Chaly. On 26 February 26, a rally gathered at the building of the Sevastopol office, the purpose of which was to prevent Rubanov from coming to the workplace. Rubanov managed to get to his workplace the next day, accompanied by the Chief of the General Staff of the Ministry of Defense of Ukraine, Admiral Yuriy Ilyin.

On 4 March, he was replaced by Dmitry Belik as the acting head of Sevastopol.

Before the referendum on the status of Crimea on 16 March 2014, Rubanov announced that in the event of the annexation of Crimea to Russia, the Sevastopol cell of the Party of Regions would be transformed into the public association “Russian Sevastopol”.

== Family ==
He is married and has daughter.
