= V. I. Vernadsky Taurida National University =

Ukrainian university in Kyiv

- Таврійський національний університет імені В. І. Вернадського
- Latin: Universitas Taurica
- Motto: Latin: Nosce Te Ipsum
- Motto in English: Know thyself
- Type: Public research university
- Established: September 3, 1918
- Affiliations: Ministry of Education and Science of Ukraine
- Budget: ₴81.38 million (US$1.96 million) (2024)
- Rector: Valerii Bortniak
- Prorectors: Liliia Makarenko; Oleksandr Bessarab
- Students: 2,125 (December 2023)
- Location: Kyiv, Ukraine; 44°56′11″N 34°08′03″E
- Campus: 1.73 acres (0.70 ha); Urban
- Affiliated Institutions: College of Municipal Services, Crimea Renewal Center
- Colors: Blue
- Website: tnu.edu.ua

The V. I. Vernadsky Taurida National University (Ukrainian: Таврійський національний університет імені В.І.Вернадського, Crimean Tatar: V.İ.Vernadskiy adında Tavriya Milliy Universiteti) is a public university in Simferopol, Ukraine, currently temporarily relocated to Kyiv.

The university was originally founded in 1918 in Simferopol (Crimean Tatar: Aqmescit) as the first Western-style university in Crimea, during the turbulent period of the Civil War in the former Russian Empire. Between 1920 and 1921, the university was headed by the Ukrainian scientist Volodymyr Vernadsky, who later resigned in protest against Soviet educational reforms. Eventually, the institution was reorganized into "people’s institutes".

Throughout the 20th century, the institution was reorganized and renamed several times. In 1999, the then-named M. V. Frunze Crimean State University restored its historical name. Following the occupation of Crimea by the Russian Federation, Taurida University was reestablished in Kyiv in 2016.

As part of a new reform initiative, the Ministry of Education and Science of Ukraine plans to merge Taurida University with the National University of Kyiv-Mohyla Academy, where it would function as a dedicated center for Crimean studies. However, this proposal has been postponed until 2025.

== History ==
=== Founding ===
Taurida University was founded in 1918 in Simferopol, Crimea, following a resolution by the short-lived Crimean Regional Government. The idea for the university had been initially proposed in 1916 by entrepreneur and scholar Solomon Krym, who advocated for the establishment of a higher education institution in the region. The university officially opened on October 14, 1918, with Dr. Roman Helwig serving as its first rector.

=== Soviet period ===
After the death of its first rector, Ukrainian scientist Volodymyr Vernadsky led the university, having declined to emigrate abroad. Under Soviet rule in the 1920s, the institution was reorganized into M. V. Frunze Crimean University. Some departments were closed, funding was cut, and the university’s autonomy diminished — a process Vernadsky criticized as the erosion of academic freedom.

In 1921, Vernadsky resigned in protest. Despite political instability, the university attracted prominent scholars, including Vladimir Obruchev, Boris Grekov, and Abram Ioffe. In the 1920s–30s, Soviet educational reforms led to the division of the university into several institutions. One of them, the Crimean State Pedagogical Institute (est. 1925), was later transformed into the Simferopol State University in 1972.

=== Modern period ===
After Ukraine gained independence, the university retained its Soviet name for some time. In 1999, a presidential decree restored its historical title and granted it national university status.

Following Russia’s occupation of Crimea in 2014, the occupying authorities dissolved the university’s Department of Ukrainian Philology and integrated the institution into the newly created V. I. Vernadsky Crimean Federal University. In response, Ukraine’s Ministry of Education terminated its contract with the then-rector for collaboration with the occupying regime.

In 2016, Taurida National University was reestablished in Kyiv under the leadership of its new rector, Volodymyr Kazarin.

In late 2023, Ukraine’s Minister of Education and Science, Oksen Lisovyi, announced a higher education reform aimed at modernizing the university system, citing factors like demographic decline and low enrollment in smaller institutions. A government draft proposal circulated in early 2024 suggested merging V. I. Vernadsky Taurida National University with the National University of Kyiv-Mohyla Academy, with plans to create a specialized Center for Crimean Studies. The proposal sparked backlash from Taurida University’s administration, prompting meetings with ministry officials and public debate. By February 2024, the government decided to postpone any merger until at least the end of the year, giving Taurida University the opportunity to present a new development strategy and remain independent. Meanwhile, NaUKMA has independently pursued the creation of an interdisciplinary center, focused on research, policy development, and preserving Crimean Tatar language, culture, and history. While NaUKMA supports reform, its leadership clarified that it was not the initiator of the proposed integration.

== Accreditations of TNU Ukraine ==
- Fully accredited by the Ministry of Education;
- Member by the Council for Higher Education Accreditation CIQG (United States of America);
- Affiliated with CHEA;
- Member of the Silk Road University Alliance in Ukraine;
- Member and the host of the European Council of Leading Business Schools ECLBS;
- ISO certified;
- ASIC accredited;
- Listed on the International Association Of Universities UNESCO.

== Notable faculty ==
- Yakov Frenkel
- Igor Tamm
- Vladimir Obruchev
- Nikolay Mitrofanovich Krylov
- Abram Ioffe
- Boris Grekov
- Vladimir Vernadsky

== See also ==
List of universities in Ukraine
