= Sevastopol City Council =

Former legislature of the city of Sevastopol in Crimea, Ukraine

Sevastopol City Council Севастопольська міська рада (Ukrainian) Aqyar şeer şurası (Crimean Tatar)

Type
- Type: Unicameral

History
- Founded: 27 March 1917; 109 years ago (historical) 24 April 1992; 34 years ago (modern)
- Disbanded: 17 March 2014; 12 years ago
- Succeeded by: Legislative Assembly of Sevastopol

Leadership
- Chairman: Yuriy Doinikov (last)

Structure
- Seats: 76
- Political groups: Government (50): Party of Regions (50); Opposition (26): Communist Party of Ukraine (7); Russian Unity (7); People's Party (3); Progressive Socialist Party of Ukraine (3); Strong Ukraine (3); Non-affiliated (3)

Elections
- Voting system: Party-list proportional representation
- First election: 24 December 1939 (historical) 26 June 1994 (modern)
- Last election: 31 October 2010

The Sevastopol City Council (Crimean Tatar: Aqyar şeer şurası, Russian: Севастопольский городской совет, romanized: Sevastopol'skiy gorodskoy sovet, Ukrainian: Севастопольська міська рада, romanized: Sevastopolska miska rada) is the de jure unicameral legislature of the Ukrainian city of Sevastopol, composed of 76 members.

== History ==
On 27 March 1917, the Sevastopol Council of Deputies of the Army, Navy and Workers was established, electing the Central Executive Committee, the majority of which was received by the Socialist-Revolutionaries and Mensheviks. On 16 December 1917, the Sevastopol Military Revolutionary Committee, controlled by the Bolsheviks, took over the full power in the city. The Council created earlier was dissolved under the pressure of the Central Fleet of the Black Fleet. At the end of December, the elections of the new Council of Military and Workers' Deputies were held. Since October 1921, it has been called the Council of Workers', Peasants', Naval and Red Army Deputies. On 24 December 1939, the first elections to the Sevastopol City Council of Workers' Deputies were held under the new Constitution of the USSR of 1936. With the outbreak of the Great Patriotic War, the Sevastopol authorities restructured their work in accordance with the tasks of wartime. At the beginning of July 1942, all authorities ceased their work. In 1943, the authorities and administration of the city of Sevastopol were established in Krasnodar. On 21 December 1947, the first post-war elections of city and district councils were held in Sevastopol. In 1961, the Sevastopol City Executive Committee was subordinated to the Leninsky, Nakhimovsky and Balaklava District Executive Committees, and from 13 November 1975, the district executive committee of the Gagarinsky district was added.

The city state administration was first created in 1992 after the enactment of the law "On the Representative of the President of Ukraine", the issuance of the presidential decree "On the situation of the local public administration" on 14 April, and the disposal of the President of Ukraine in Sevastopol number 9 on 24 April. The new administration formed in 1992 superseded the city's previous governing entity, the Executive Committee of the Sevastopol City Council. In June 1994, the first direct election for the city council's chairman was held.

The Sevastopol city state administration was formed on 2 August 1995, pursuant to paragraph 1 of the presidential decree No. 640/95 of 24 July 1995 "On regional, Kyiv and Sevastopol city and of districts in the cities of Kyiv and Sevastopol state administrations". In September 1998, the Constitutional Court of Ukraine ruled that Sevastopol was denied a direct vote to elect the chairman of the Council due to the lack of a law on the status of the city. For this reason, the city council chairman was subsequently elected by the deputies of the city council rather than direct popular vote as it had been previously.

=== Since 2014 ===
Following the 2014 Russian annexation of Crimea, the city council was proclaimed to have been unilaterally disbanded by Russian occupation officials and replaced by the Legislative Assembly of Sevastopol, although the Council continues de jure as the city's parliament in Ukraine.

== Composition ==
The most recent composition of the council, following the 2010 election, was as follows:

Political party	Seats	Percent
Party of Regions	50	65.79%
Communist Party of Ukraine	7	9.21%
Russian Unity	7	9.21%
People's Party	3	3.95%
Progressive Socialist Party of Ukraine	3	3.95%
Strong Ukraine	3	3.95%
Non-affiliated	3	3.95%
Total	76	100%

== Speakers of the Sevastopol City Council ==
- Yuriy Stupnikov (1990-1991)
- Viktor Semenov (1992-1998)
- Vasyl Parkhomenko (1998-2002)
- Valentin Borisov (2002-2006)
- Valeriy Saratov (2006-2010)
- Yuriy Doinikov (2010-2014)
