= Oleksandr Yemets =

Ukrainian politician (1959–2001)

- Олександр Ємець
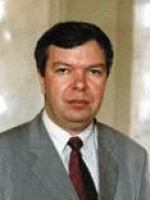
- Official portrait, 1998

People's Deputy of Ukraine
- In office 15 May 1990 – 28 January 2001
- Preceded by: Position established (1990); Orest-Stepan Vlokh (1994)
- Succeeded by: Eduard Pavlenko (1994); Constituency abolished (1998)
- Constituency: Kyiv, Central Kyiv (1990–1994); Lviv Oblast, Halytskyi District (1994–1998); People's Democratic Party, No. 6 (1998–2001)

Minister of Nationalities and Migration
- In office 26 April 1993 – 1 July 1994
- Prime Minister: Leonid Kuchma; Vitaliy Masol
- Preceded by: Position established
- Succeeded by: Volodymyr Yevtukh

Personal details
- Born: 1 January 1959 Velyka Medvedivka, Ukrainian SSR, Soviet Union (now Ukraine)
- Died: 28 January 2001 (aged 42) Apostolove, Ukraine
- Cause of death: Traffic collision
- Resting place: Baikove Cemetery, Kyiv
- Party: Reforms and Order Party (1999–2001); People's Democratic Party (1996–1999); New Ukraine (1992–c. 1994); Party of Democratic Revival of Ukraine (1990–1996); Communist Party of the Soviet Union (until 1990)
- Children: 1 (Leonid)
- Education: Taras Shevchenko Kyiv State University; Kyiv Higher School of the Ministry of Internal Affairs

Oleksandr Ivanovych Yemets (Ukrainian: Олекса́ндр Іва́нович Є́мець; 1 January 1959 – 28 January 2001) was a Ukrainian politician who served as a People's Deputy of Ukraine from 1990 until his death in 2001, representing Kyiv and Lviv Oblast.

== Early life and career ==
Oleksandr Ivanovych Yemets was born on 1 January 1959 in the village of Velyka Medvedivka, in Ukraine's central Khmelnytskyi Oblast. His father, Ivan Korniiovych Yemets, was a teacher and director of a local school; his mother, Mariia Vasylivna, was a feldsher. From 1974 to 1976, Yemets worked on a kolkhoz in Velyka Medvedivka. He later studied at Taras Shevchenko Kyiv State University from 1976 to 1981, graduating with a degree in philosophy. During the 1986 Chernobyl disaster, Yemets worked as a liquidator, being awarded a medal by the Soviet government that year. Afterwards, he was a student at the Kyiv Higher School of the Ministry of Internal Affairs (now the National Academy of Internal Affairs), graduating in 1989. After his graduation, he worked as an officer of the Ministry of Internal Affairs in Kyiv.

== Political career ==
Yemets was a candidate in the 1990 Ukrainian Supreme Soviet election for central Kyiv, part of the anti-communist Democratic Bloc. At the time of his election, he was a member of the Communist Party of the Soviet Union. He was a member of the New Ukraine party and the Party of Democratic Revival of Ukraine. In the Verkhovna Rada (parliament of Ukraine), he was chair of the Human Rights Commission and deputy chairman of the Democratic Bloc's parliamentary group. He was re-elected in 1994, representing the city of Lviv's Halytskyi District (by which point he had left New Ukraine), and in 1998 on the proportional representative list of the People's Democratic Party. He left the People's Democratic Party in June 1999, joining the Reforms and Order Party.

Yemets was the first Minister of Nationalities and Migration, serving from 26 April 1993 to 1 July 1994. From 26 March to 14 August 1996, he was also deputy prime minister for political and legal affairs. In 1992, he was briefly a member of the State Duma of Ukraine with a portfolio of legal matters. From 1992 to 1998, he was an adviser to presidents Leonid Kravchuk and Leonid Kuchma on drafting the Constitution of Ukraine. He was a founding member of the People's Democratic Party and a member of its executive council.

Yemets was a member of the board of Galician Investments ZAT IK from 1995 to 1998, alongside Andriy Sadovyi. Sadovyi would later become mayor of Lviv.

== Death ==
On the evening of 28 January 2001, Yemets was travelling towards Kryvyi Rih in his brother's Mercedes-Benz 280E on Highway N-23 at a speed of 260 km/h (160 mph). At 20:30, while six kilometres from the village of Marianske in Dnipropetrovsk Oblast, the car slid off the highway and into a ditch, colliding with a tree. Yemets's arms, legs and hips were fractured, and he suffered a traumatic brain injury. Following the crash, the car's driver, Ruslan Zaichenko, took Yemets to the nearby city of Apostolove, where he was treated at a local hospital. Yemets died that evening. Zaichenko was not seriously injured during the crash. Investigators from the State Automobile Inspectorate concluded after one day that Yemets' death had been accidental.

After his death, Yemets was buried at Baikove Cemetery. He had one son, Leonid, who later became a politician in his own right.
