= Valerii Omelchenko =

Ukrainian politician (born 1980)

- Валерій Омельченко
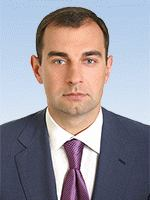
- An official portrait of him from 2012.

People's Deputy of Ukraine
- In office 12 December 2012 – 27 November 2014
- Constituency: Donetsk Oblast, No. 55

Personal details
- Born: Valerii Pavlovych Omelchenko; 4 October 1980 (age 46) Donetsk, Ukrainian SSR, Soviet Union
- Party: Party of Regions (2006-2014)
- Education: Donetsk Economic College (1999); Donetsk National University of Economics and Trade named after M. Tugan-Baranovsky (2002); International Scientific and Technical University named after Academician Yuriy Bugai (2010)

Valerii Pavlovych Omelchenko (Ukrainian: Валерій Павлович Омельченко; born 4 October 1980) is a Ukrainian politician and businessman who served as a People's Deputy of Ukraine in the Verkhovna Rada representing the 7th convocation from 2012 to its premature end in 2014 with the Party of Regions. Outside of politics, he is also a businessman, and has founded numerous enterprises, most notably "HUB 4.0" in Kyiv and the programme "IT-schoolchild".

== Early life ==
Omelchenko was born on 4 October 1980 in the city of Donetsk, which was then part of the Ukrainian SSR in the Soviet Union. After graduating from secondary school, he immediately pursued higher education and, in 1999, graduated from the Donetsk Economic College with a specialisation in finance and credit. He then entered the workforce, becoming the chief tax auditor and inspector of the State Tax Service of Ukraine in Donetsk. He remained there for three years, until 2002. At the end of his time there, he also graduated from the Donetsk National University of Economics and Trade named after M. Tugan-Baranovsky with a specialisation as an economist. Omelchenko then returned to the workforce and became an operator in the tax police for the State Tax Service of Ukraine in Donetsk for another year, until 2003. Omelchenko was then appointed director of the collective enterprise KP "VOIK", a position he held for five years. He then temporarily left to study full-time, and in 2010 graduated from the International Scientific and Technical University named after Academician Yuriy Bugai with a specialisation as a mining engineer, specifically in the area of oil and gas production.

== Business career ==
He then became Deputy Director of the Research Association "Energomethan". In 2012, provisions were given for Energomethan to extract methane from the boundary of the "Chaykino Mine", owned by Makeevvuhillia in Makiivka. Since his retirement from politics in 2014, he has been the head of the Ukrainian branches of Wellmind Invest and IOC Trading in Ukraine. He is also the primary ultimate beneficial owner of LLC "Hub 4.0" and JSC "Valores".

Hub 4.0 was a self-described "innovation space" on Yaroslavskyi Lane in Kyiv that opened in December 2015, which he helped develop with Kateryna Yurchenko, an Honored Economist of Ukraine. Since its opening, it has held a number of events, such as a Microsoft competition and the forum "Digital Medicine in Ukraine". Afterwards, he created the initiative "IT-schoolchild", which is intended to promote information technology education in schools, which he first proposed in December 2016. The proposal in 2016 was for compulsory IT education in schools starting from the first grade, with basics including programming, cybersecurity, innovation, robotics, #d printing, and other technologies. The pilot for it launched in 2018 at three schools: Education Complex No. 167 in Kyiv, a school in Mala Divytsia, and one in Pryluky.

== Social activities ==
After the War in the Donbas, he initiated the project "Unified Register of Damage to the Infrastructure of Donbas". A year later, on 21 April 2016, Omelchenko was appointed head of the IT Committee of the Association of Taxpayers of Ukraine. He was appointed one of the vice-presidents of the association in June 2017, and as of October 2025, he is still one.

== Political career ==
In 2006, he was elected to the Donetsk Oblast Council as a member of the Party of Regions. He did not participate in the following elections to the council in 2010, instead returning to Energomethan. In the lead-up to the 2012 Ukrainian parliamentary elections, it was speculated that Omelchenko would run in them. He indeed did run, choosing to run in constituency No. 55 with the Party of Regions. At the time of its formation, the 55th district consisted of the cities of Zhdanivka and Khrestivka, alongside the Hirnytskyi District and Sovietskyi District of the city of Makiivka. He ultimately won in a landslide to the 7th convocation in the 55th with 69.30% (61,133 people) of the vote.

Upon being elected to the Rada, he immediately joined the Party of Regions and was elected Chairman of the Committee on Informatisation and Information Technologies. His term was mostly uneventful initially, with Omelchenko only introducing, in late 2013, a tax of 15 to 17% on the income of individuals from the sale or exchange of any real estate object. The newspaper Delo said that it would bury the Ukrainian real estate industry, and it was said the initiative would likely be unsupported by the majority of deputies. He was also one of the first deputies within the Party of Regions to propose removing Oleksandr Yefremov as the party's faction leader and replace him with Vadym Novynskyi, although this was ultimately unsuccessful in May 2014. His constituency was heavily affected by the War in the Donbas, as nearly all of it was captured by the DPR. He did run in the subsequent snap 2014 Ukrainian parliamentary elections in the minor parts of the 55th that were still under Ukrainian control, but he was not selected.

== Personal life ==
He is married to Viktoriia Dzharty, a lawyer and judge who served as a judge on the Commercial Court of Donetsk Region and is currently a judge on the Commercial Court of Kyiv as of 2026. She was also the founder of the "Second Wind" initiative that supported the children of IDPs in Kyiv. Together, they have four children. Viktoriia's father, and thus Omelchenko's father-in-law, was Vasyl Dzharty, the former Prime Minister of Crimea from 2010 until his death in 2011.
