= Taras Stetskiv =

Ukrainian politician

- Тарас Стецьків
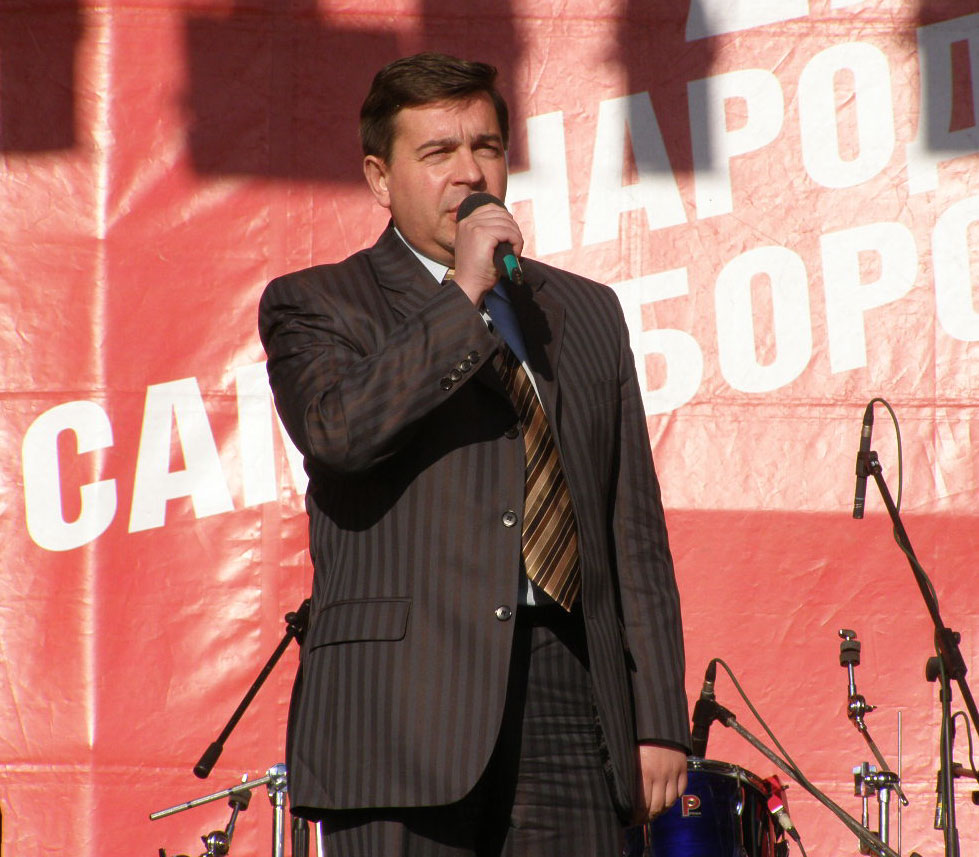
- Stetskiv in 2007

People's Deputy of Ukraine
- In office 23 November 2007 – 12 December 2012
- Constituency: NUNS, No. 29^{[A]}
- In office 15 May 1990 – 25 May 2006
- Preceded by: Position established (1990); Constituency established (1994); Yuriy Kryvoruchko (2002)
- Succeeded by: Ivan Bilas (1994); Constituency abolished (1998, 2006)
- Constituency: Lviv Oblast, Mostyska (1990–1994); Lviv Oblast, Horodok (1994–1998); NDP, No. 10 (1998–2002)^{[A]}; Lviv Oblast, No. 118 (2002–2006)

Personal details
- Born: 7 June 1964 (age 62) Lviv, Ukrainian SSR, Soviet Union
- Party: Independent (since 2006)
- Other political affiliations: Rukh (1990–1991); PDVU (1991–1996); NDP (1996–1999); Reforms and Order (1999–2006); Civil Position (2014); New Ukraine; NUNS (2002–2012)
- Education: University of Lviv
- A. Party-list proportional representation seat.

Taras Stepanovych Stetskiv (Ukrainian: Тарас Степанович Стецьків; born 7 June 1964) is a Ukrainian national democratic politician who served as a People's Deputy of Ukraine from 1990 to 2006 and from 2007 to 2012, representing various constituencies in Lviv Oblast and party-list proportional representation seats. Stetskiv was an organiser of the Ukraine without Kuchma protests, Viktor Yushchenko's campaign in the 2004 Ukrainian presidential election and the Orange Revolution, supporting mass mobilisation efforts in contrast to efforts to negotiate with the government of Leonid Kuchma.

== Early life and career ==
Taras Stepanovych Stetskiv was born in Lviv on 7 June 1964 into a family of goldsmiths. He studied at the University of Lviv faculty of history, graduating in 1986. He briefly taught at a boarding school before later studying at Lviv Medical University, and was a member of the Komsomol in his youth. Stetskiv was a member of the Lion's Society from 1987 to 1989, serving as the organisation's secretary. Stetskiv subsequently joined the People's Movement of Ukraine (Ukrainian: Народний Рух України, romanized: Narodnyi Rukh Ukrainy, abbreviated Rukh), where he served as a member of the party's supreme council and the Lviv Territory Council.

== Political career ==
Stetskiv first ran in the 1990 Ukrainian Supreme Soviet election, contesting the city of Mostyska in Lviv Oblast for the anti-communist Democratic Bloc coalition. He placed first in the second round of voting, with 61.98% of the vote. In the Verkhovna Rada (Ukrainian parliament), he was a member of the liberal New Ukraine alliance, as well as the Legal Committee. He was a member of the presidium of the Party of Democratic Revival of Ukraine from 1991.

Stetskiv was an advisor to Leonid Kuchma on economic reforms during his premiership, being among the five national democrats to serve in the Kuchma government. After the Party of Democratic Revival joined New Ukraine, Stetskiv continued to work alongside Kuchma, and from 1996, he was a member of the People's Democratic Party, a party of power centred around Kuchma's presidency. Stetskiv was deputy chairman of the People's Democratic Party for ideological affairs and chairman of the Lviv branch of the party.

Stetskiv was re-elected in the 1994 Ukrainian parliamentary election, representing Horodok, Lviv Oblast. Stetskiv's main opponent in the election was former Soviet dissident and human rights activist Iryna Kalynets, and the contest in Horodok was marked by acrimony between the two, with Andrii Vashchenko of the web portal "Criminal Ukraine" noting that Stetskiv "did not hesitate to pour dirt on the head of Mrs. Kalynets" during the campaign. At this time, Stetskiv also became a business partner of Andriy Sadovyi. He ran again in the 1998 Ukrainian parliamentary election for Ukraine's 120th electoral district, which includes Horodok. Stetskiv lost the election to Ivan Bilas, but was elected on the electoral list of the People's Democratic Party, occupying the tenth position on the list. In June 1999, after the People's Democratic Party dissolved, he joined the Reforms and Order Party. Stetskiv played an organisational role in the Ukraine without Kuchma protests, joining the Batkivshchyna-aligned "National Salvation Front" in February 2011.

At the 2002 Ukrainian parliamentary election Stetskiv was re-elected, this time for Ukraine's 118th electoral district with a majority of 34.19%. Stetskiv contested the election as a member of the Reforms and Order Party, which was part of the Our Ukraine Bloc at the time. He was a member of the Verkhovna Rada Budget Committee.

During the 2004 Ukrainian presidential election Stetskiv was an organiser for Viktor Yushchenko's presidential campaign. In the subsequent Orange Revolution, Stetskiv was, alongside Yuriy Lutsenko, one of the leaders of the youth movement that rejected negotiations in favour of mass mobilisation in an effort to encourage Kuchma to step down and recognise Yushchenko's election as president.

Following the victory of the Orange Revolution and Yushchenko's accession to the presidency, Stetskiv was appointed chairman of the National Television and Radio Broadcasting Council of Ukraine on 25 February 2005. In this position, Stetskiv primarily dedicated his efforts to ensuring the success of the Eurovision Song Contest 2005, with deputy chairman Andriy Shevchenko being in charge of efforts to increase transparency and establish a public broadcasting service. The two both resigned within eight months of their appointment, with Stetskiv leaving office on 8 September 2005. He later ran in the 2006 Ukrainian parliamentary election on the electoral list of an alliance between Reforms and Order and non-governmental organisation PORA. As the alliance failed to pass the 3% minimum threshold for entry into the Verkhovna Rada, Stetskiv lost his seat. He later served as an advisor to Yushchenko from 2006 to 2007. Stetskiv rejected the involvement of business figures (such as Petro Poroshenko) in the post-Orange Revolution government, arguing that they were remnants of Kuchma's presidency who lacked an interest in democracy or personal liberties.

Stetskiv was expelled from Reforms and Order on 16 November 2006. He later founded the People's Self-Defence movement alongside Lutsenko in January 2007, and participated in the 2007 Ukrainian parliamentary election as an independent candidate on the electoral list of the Our Ukraine – People's Self-Defense Bloc. As the 29th candidate on the list, Stetskiv was elected into the 6th Ukrainian Verkhovna Rada. He was deputy chairman of the bloc's faction in the Rada, and served on the Privatisation Committee and the Committee on the Fuel and Energy Complex, Nuclear Policy and Nuclear Security.

Stetskiv was the 7th candidate on the electoral list of the Civil Position party in the 2014 Ukrainian parliamentary election, though he was an independent at the time. As the party failed to pass the electoral threshold, he was not elected. During the war in Donbas, Stetskiv advocated for a referendum in the Donbas on whether it should remain as part of Ukraine followed by a referendum throughout the rest of Ukraine to affirm a border change. He argued that by doing so, Ukrainian politics would be unable to be "blackmailed" by pro-Russian politicians in the region.

Stetskiv is a member of the Free Nations of Post-Russia Forum, representing Ukraine.
