= Pavlo Burlakov =

Ukrainian politician and miner

- Павло Бурлаков
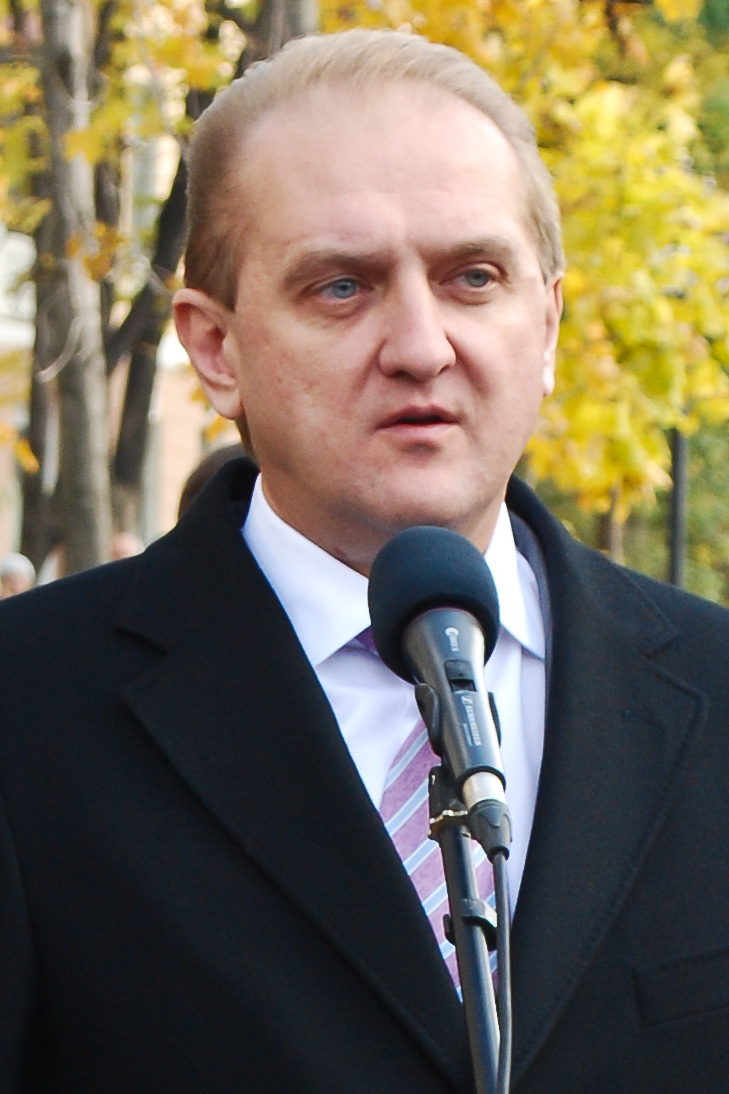
- Burlakov in 2011

Personal details
- Born: Pavlo Mykolaiyovych Burlakov; June 19, 1963 (age 63) Donetsk, Ukrainian SSR, USSR (now Ukraine)
- Party: United Russia (2014-present); Party of Regions (2005-2014); Liberal Party of Ukraine (1995-2005)
- Education: Donetsk National Technical University
- Occupation: Politician, miner

Pavlo Mykolaiyovych Burlakov (Ukrainian: Павло Миколайович Бурлаков; Russian: Павел Николаевич Бурлаков; born June 19, 1963) is a Russian politician and miner who has been serving as Deputy Chairman of the Executive Committee of the Sevastopol branch of United Russia in the Russian-occupied Republic of Crimea since 2019, a territory internationally recognised as part of Ukraine.

From 2010 to 2014, he served as the First Vice Prime Minister of Crimea and ex officio served as Prime Minister of Crimea upon the abrupt death of Vasyl Dzharty.

== Early life ==
Burlakov was born on 19 July 1963 in the city of Donetsk, which was then part of the Ukrainian SSR of the Soviet Union at the time of his birth. His father, Mykola Semenovych, was a worker in the coal industry, and his mother, Natalia Mykolaivna, was a nurse. In 1985, he graduated from the Donetsk National Technical University with a specialization in mining machines and complexes. Afterwards, he started working as a mining foreman and shift supervisor of the Krasnogvardeyskaya mine, which was owned by the coal production association Makeyevugoal of Makiivka.

Afterwards, until 1990, he worked his way up from 2nd secretary to 1st secretary of the Red Guard Regional Committee of the Komsomol for Makiivka. He then served as Secretary of Donetsk Regional Committee of the Komsomol up until the collapse of the Soviet Union. After its collapse, he worked as Deputy Chairman of the Union of Youth Organizations of the Donbas and as director of the company "UNPRO".

== Political career ==
In 1995, he became a representative of the Liberal Party of Ukraine in Makiivka until 2000, when he was appointed assistant to the chhairman of the executive committee of the Makiivka City Council. In 2005, he also became Head of the Department for Ideological Work for the Party of Regions. During the 2006 Ukrainian parliamentary election he became a People's Deputy of Ukraine representing the Party of Regions as part of the party list. In the Rada, he served as a member of the budget committee. He stayed as an MP until 2010. He then served as First Vice Prime Minister of Crimea and ex officio served as Prime Minister of Crimea upon the abrupt death of Vasyl Dzharty until Anatolii Mohyliov officially succeeded him.

After the 2014 Russian annexation of Crimea, he served as an assistant to Dmitry Sablin, a member of the Russian State Duma. In January 2019, he was appointed Deputy Chairman of the Executive Committee of the Sevastopol branch of United Russia. In addition, in February, he was elected to the political council of the Nakhimov District branch of United Russia.

Preceded by Vasyl Dzharty	(acting) Prime Minister of Crimea; 2011	Succeeded by Anatoliy Mohyliov
