= Ihor Bondarenko =

Ukrainian politician

- Ігор Бондаренко
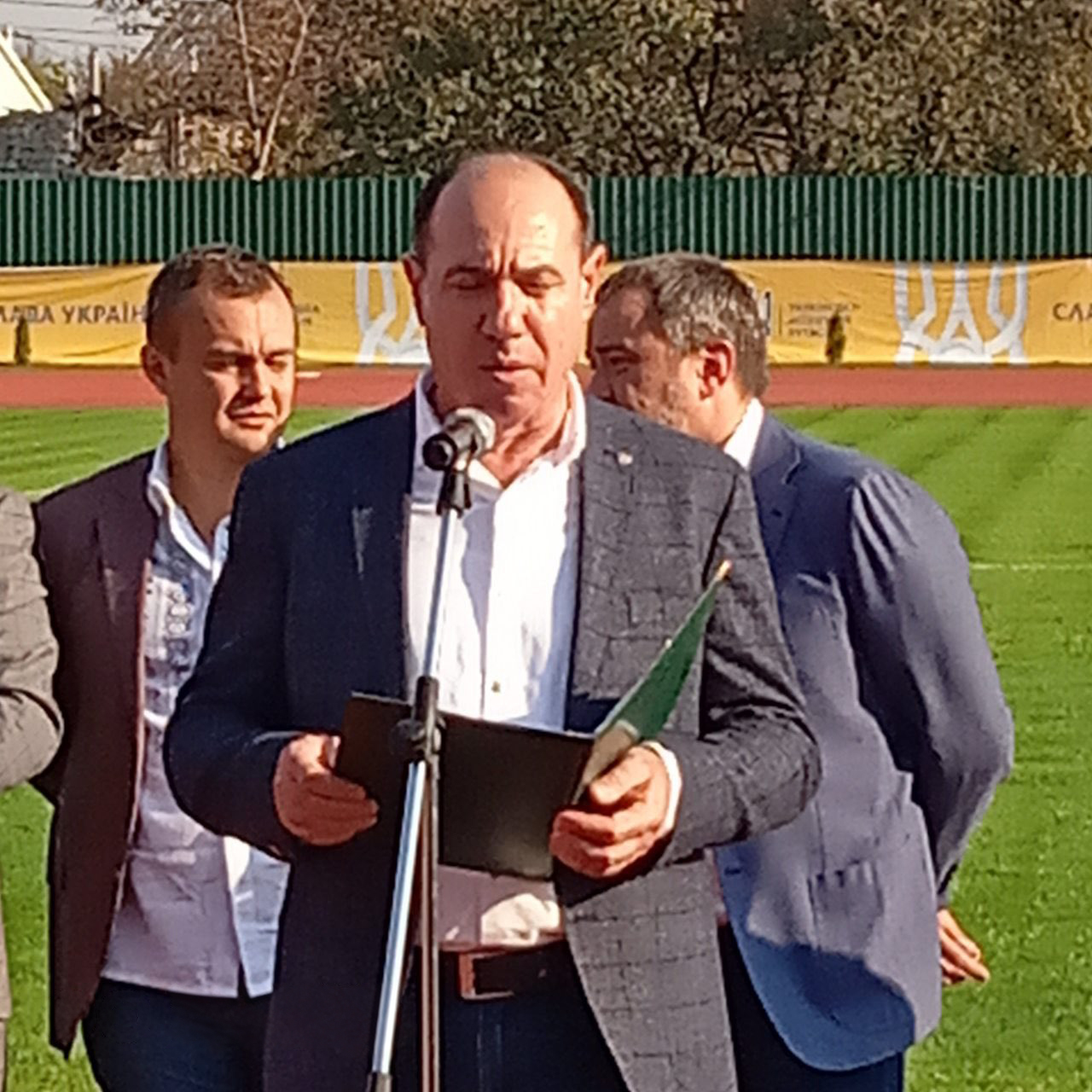
- Ihor Bondarenko in 2019

Governor of Zakarpattia Oblast
- In office 5 July – 26 December 2019
- President: Volodymyr Zelenskyy
- Prime Minister: Volodymyr Groysman; Oleksiy Honcharuk
- Preceded by: Hennadiy Moskal
- Succeeded by: Oleksiy Hetmanenko (acting)

Personal details
- Born: Ihor Samiylovych Bondarenko; 20 November 1964 (age 61) Vorobyove, Saky Raion, Crimean Oblast, Soviet Union
- Party: People's Democratic Party; Independent
- Other political affiliations: Ukrainian Regional Asset
- Education: Simferopol Higher Military-Political Construction School; National Academy of State Administration; National Academy of Internal Affairs
- Occupation: entrepreneur politician

Ihor Samiylovych Bondarenko (Ukrainian: Ігор Самійлович Бондаренко; born 20 November 1964) is a Ukrainian entrepreneur and politician. He is the former Governor of Zakarpattia Oblast.

== Biography ==
Bondarenk was born on 20 November 1964 into a family of employees in the village of Vorobyove, which was located in the Crimean Oblast of the Ukrainian SSR at the time of his birth. In 1982, he graduated from Secondary School No. 13 in Yevpatoria. In 1986, he graduated from Simferopol Higher Military-Political Construction School. Afterwards, he entered the military for the Soviet Army, serving within military Unit 93408 in Mukachevo. He was then transferred to be an officer in military Unit 11326 which was also based in Mukachevo. In 1992, he retired from military service.

In 2002, he returned to service but in the political sphere, serving as First Deputy Head of the Mukachevo Raion State Administration (and briefly in 2003 as its Deputy Head). In 2005 he graduated from the National Academy of State Administration, and began working as an assistant consultant to the People's Deputy of Ukraine Mykola Onishchuk.

In the 2007 Ukrainian parliamentary election, he unsuccessfully ran for the Verkhovna Rada (Ukraine's parliament) for Election Bloc Liudmyla Suprun – Ukrainian Regional Asset. At the time, he was no. 93 on the party list.

From 2008 to 2010, Bondarenko headed the Administrative Department of the Ministry of Justice. He graduated from the National Academy of Internal Affairs (2012). PhD in Public Administration (2010). From 5 July to 26 December 2019 he was Governor of Zakarpattia Oblast, but was dismissed by Volodymyr Zelenskyy for a "lack of results".
