= Liudmyla Suprun =

Ukrainian politician (born 1965)

- Людмила Супрун
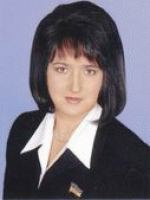
- Official portrait, 2002

People's Deputy of Ukraine
- In office 12 May 1998 – 25 May 2006
- Preceded by: Constituency established (1998)
- Succeeded by: Oleksandr Bilovol (2002)
- Constituency: Kirovohrad Oblast, No. 100 (1998–2002); For United Ukraine!, No. 37 (2002–2006)

Personal details
- Born: 7 January 1965 (age 61) Zaporizhzhia, Ukrainian SSR, Soviet Union (now Ukraine)
- Party: People's Democratic Party
- Other political affiliations: Labour Ukraine; For United Ukraine!
- Spouse: Mikolai Suprun
- Children: Tetjana (1986), Vladyslava
- Occupation: Politician, businesswoman
- Website: suprun.com.ua

Liudmyla Pavlivna Suprun (Ukrainian: Людмила Павлівна Супрун; born 7 January 1965) is a Ukrainian politician who served as a People's Deputy of Ukraine from 1998 to 2006, representing Ukraine's 100th electoral district from 1998 to 2002 before being elected on the party list of For United Ukraine. She was a candidate in the 2010 Ukrainian presidential election.

== Biography ==
Liudmyla Pavlivna Suprun was born on 7 January 1965 in the city of Zaporizhzhia, in southern Ukraine. After graduating from Kyiv University, Suprun worked as an academic researcher till 1992. Since then she worked in the field of agriculture. In 1997, Suprun was recognized as "Business Woman Ukraine 1997".

During the 1998 Ukrainian parliamentary election she was elected into the Verkhovna Rada (Ukraine's parliament) for Ukraine's 100th electoral district in Kirovohrad Oblast where she became a member of the faction of the People's Democratic Party. In 2002, Suprun was re-elected on a Labour Ukraine ticket as part of For United Ukraine. In the 2006 parliamentary election the People's Democratic Party took part in the alliance "Bloc of People's Democratic Parties" (Ukrainian: Блоку народно-демократичних партій) (together with the Democratic Union and the Democratic Party of Ukraine) but this alliance did not overcome the 3% threshold (winning only 0.49% of the votes) and therefore no seats. After taking responsibility for the defeat Valeriy Pustovoitenko resigned as leader of the People's Democratic Party. In his place the party was led by Suprun. In the 2007 parliamentary election, the People's Democratic Party again failed to win the parliamentary election, this time participating as part of Election Bloc Liudmyla Suprun – Ukrainian Regional Asset. The current Chairman of the party is still Liudmyla Suprun.

Suprun was a candidate in the 2010 Ukrainian presidential election nominated by People's Democratic Party, during the election she received 0.19% of the votes.

Suprun attempted to return to the Verkhovna Rada in the 2012 Ukrainian parliamentary election as an independent candidate in Ukraine's 101st electoral district, located in Kirovohrad Oblast. However, she finished third in the election with 17.1% of the vote.

Suprun did not participate in the 2014 Ukrainian parliamentary election.

In the 2019 Ukrainian parliamentary election Suprun again as an independent candidate tried and failed to win a parliamentary seat in Ukraine's 198th electoral district, located in Cherkasy Oblast. She finished fourth with 4.32% of the votes.
