= Oleksandr Hudyma =

Oleksandr Hudyma may refer to:

- Oleksandr Hudyma (cyclist)
- Oleksandr Hudyma (politician)
