= Yuriy Badzyo =

Ukrainian literary critic, activist and political prisoner

- Юрій Бадзьо

Chairman of the Democratic Party of Ukraine
- In office 22 September 1990 – December 1992
- Succeeded by: Volodymyr Yavorivsky

Personal details
- Born: 25 April 1936 Kopynivtsi, Ukrainian SSR, Soviet Union (now Ukraine)
- Died: 1 September 2018 (aged 82) Kyiv, Ukraine
- Party: Democratic Party of Ukraine
- Education: Uzhhorod National University

Yuriy Vasyliovych Badzyo (Ukrainian: Юрій Васильович Бадзьо; 25 April 1936 – 1 September 2018) was a Ukrainian literary critic, activist, and political prisoner. He was the founder of the Democratic Party of Ukraine and its first chairman.

== Early life and career ==
Badzyo was born into a peasant family of ten children in the village of Kopynivtsi, located in Ukraine's western Zakarpattia Oblast.

In 1958, Badzyo graduated from the Faculty of Ukrainian Language and Literature of the Uzhhorod National University, becoming a teacher of the Ukrainian language and literature before serving as a director of a school located in Mukachevo.

In 1961, he began studying for his PhD at the Taras Shevchenko Institute of Literature of the Academy of Sciences located in Kyiv. In 1964, he successfully defended his PhD and became an assistant researcher at the institute.

== Dissident activity and imprisonment ==
During his time in Kyiv, Badzyo became a member of the Artistic Youths' Club, a cultural organisation founded during the Khrushchev Thaw that became a centre for dissident members of the Ukrainian intelligentsia, collectively known as the Sixtiers. Here, he came into contact and became friends with Vasyl Stus, a fellow student and dissident, among others.

On 4 September 1965, Badzyo participated in a protest against the arrests of political activists in Ukraine alongside Ivan Dziuba, Viacheslav Chornovil, Stus, Svitlana Kyrychenko, and others, at the premiere of Armenian director Sergei Parajanov's Shadows of Forgotten Ancestors at a cinema in Kyiv. Badzyo was subsequently dismissed from his position at the institute, expelled from the Communist Party of Ukraine, and gradually deprived of the opportunity of further work in the academic field. From 1965 to 1974, Badzyo worked as a teacher, proofreader, and editor between periods of unemployment, and as a loader at a bakery from 1974 to 1979.

In 1971, Badzyo wrote a letter to the Sixth Congress of the Union of Soviet Writers of Ukraine criticising the government's national culture policy, arguing that it placed Ukrainian culture in an inferior position relative to its Russian counterpart.

The 1972–1973 Ukrainian purge that saw the arrests of political dissidents close to Badzyo such as Dzyuba and Stus as well as a KGB raid on his apartment in 1972 prompted him to write treatise on the Soviet political system, historiography, and Russification, titled "Pravo zhyty", or "The right to live". In 1977, the 1,400 page draft manuscript, encompassing four out of a planned five chapters, disappeared. Badzyo set about writing a new version and had completed 452 pages when Soviet authorities raided his apartment again in February 1979 and seized the second manuscript. He was arrested two months later in May.

On 12 December 1979, Badzyo was sentenced to seven years of imprisonment, which he served at the Dubravlag labour camp, and a further five years in exile in Khandyga, Yakutia, for "anti-Soviet agitation and propaganda" under Article 62 of the Ukrainian SSR's Criminal Code.

Due to factors such as the death of Anatoly Marchenko in prison, a dissident and founding member of the Moscow Helsinki Group, coupled with international pressure and the beginning of perestroika under Mikhail Gorbachev, Soviet authorities began granting amnesties and early releases to prisoners in 1986. However, prisoners had to pledge to refrain from future "anti-Soviet authorities" or write letters requesting pardons in order to be released, which Badzyo refused to do. As a result, he was only allowed to return from exile on 9 December 1988, two days after Gorbachev publicly asserted at the United Nations General Assembly in Geneva that all political prisoners in the Soviet Union had already been freed and allowed to return home.

== Return to Ukraine and participation in national politics ==
Badzyo and his wife Kyrychenko returned to Kyiv in January 1989. That year, Badzyo authored the "Programme of the Ukrainian Party for Democratic Socialism and State Independence", in which he outlined the need to establish an independent democratic socialist (in opposition to the "real socialism" of the Soviet Union, which Badzyo also labelled "feudal socialism") Ukrainian state. It formed the basis of the more moderate social-democratic Democratic Party of Ukraine, an offshoot of the People's Movement of Ukraine or "Rukh", with Badzyo becoming its first chairman on 22 September 1990.

During Ukraine's first presidential election held in 1991, Badzyo led the pro-Leonid Kravchuk national-democratic bloc against the candidacy of Rukh's leader, Viascheslav Chornovil. Badzyo's decision to support Kravchuk, a member of the nomenklatura and the then-chairman of the Verkhovna Rada of the Ukrainian SSR, put him at odds with many of his contemporaries, members of the Ukrainian intelligentsia and Soviet-era dissidents. Badzyo criticised them for prioritising "ideology" over "national liberation", arguing not only that it was impossible to construct a new state without the support of the nomenklatura, as they controlled Ukraine's political, economical, and social institutions, but that it was necessary in order to secure Ukrainian independence from the threat of anti-Ukrainian Russophilia.

On 8 August 1992, the party split from Rukh (at this point still an umbrella organisation) over its decision to oppose Kravchuk's presidency and formed the Congress of National-Democratic Forces with fifteen other political parties and organisations. It was led by three co-chairs, Badzyo, leader of the Ukrainian Republican Party Mykhailo Horyn, and the leader of the women's wing of Rukh Larysa Skoryk. The coalition positioned itself against federalising Ukraine and advocated for exiting the Commonwealth of Independent States.

In December the same year, Badzyo stood down as chairman at the 2nd Congress of the Democratic Party. He was replaced by Volodymyr Yavorivsky.

In 1993, Badzyo became an editor at the Institute of Philosophy of the National Academy of Sciences of Ukraine. He became a member of the National Writers' Union of Ukraine in 1996.

== Personal life ==
Badzyo met his wife Svitlana Kyrychenko while studying together at the Taras Shevchenko Institute of Literature in 1963. They married in 1964 and had two children, a son and daughter.

=== Political views ===
In an open letter addressed to the Presidium of the Supreme Soviet, written after the seizure of his second manuscript and shortly before his arrest, Badzyo compared his views to Eurocommunism, conceptualising them as a form of democratic socialism; the implementation of which would bring closer, but not necessarily the achievement of, Karl Marx's ideal of a communist society, which Badzyo calls "utopian".

Vladyslav Starodubtsev, a historian of labour and left-wing political history, argued that Badzyo belonged to the trend of "socialist humanism" that included Marxist humanist groups such as the Praxis School in Yugoslavia and the Budapest School in Hungary, as well as Socialism with a human face in Czechoslovakia.

The Internet Encyclopedia of Ukraine mentions him as a national communist thinker.

== Awards ==
- Antonovych prize (2000)
