= Svitlana Kyrychenko =

Ukrainian human rights activist

Svitlana Tykhonivna Kyrychenko (Ukrainian: Світла́на Ти́хонівна Кириче́нко, 31 October 1935 – 22 April 2016) was a member of the Ukrainian human rights movement. Wife of Yuriy Badzyo.

== Early life and education ==
Svitlana Kyrychenko was born on 31 October 1935 in Kyiv. In 1957, she graduated from the Faculty of Philology at Taras Shevchenko National University of Kyiv. After graduation, Kyrychenko began working at the Institute of Literature of the USSR Academy of Sciences in Kyiv, where she met Ivan Svitlychny, Leonid Kovalenko, Yuriy Badzyo, and Vasyl Stus, who influenced her national consciousness. In 1963, Kyrychenko met Yuriy Badzyo at the Institute of Literature of the USSR Academy of Sciences, whom she married in 1964. They had two children — a son and a daughter.

== Activism ==
In 1965, Kyrychenko took part in a political protest at the "Ukraina" cinema in Kyiv against the arrests of Ukrainian intellectuals and distributed samvydav.

From 1969, Kyrychenko worked at the Institute of Philosophy of the USSR Academy of Sciences in Kyiv.

In 1972, after the arrest of Nadiya Svitlychna, a member of the sixties movement, human rights activist, publicist, memoirist, journalist, Kyrychenko wrote a letter to the First Secretary of the Central Committee of the Communist Party demanding the return of her 2-year-old son taken from kindergarten, for which she was fired (she remained unemployed until further notice).

In 1979, the Kyrychenkos family's apartment was searched and Yuriy Badzyo's manuscript "The Right to Live" was confiscated. Kyrychenko addressed an open letter to the international community and the party and state leadership of the USSR with an open letter, which was repeatedly voiced in the programs of Radio Svoboda, with a biography of her husband and a summary of this work.

Kyrychenko disseminated information about political repressions in Ukraine, established contacts with dissidents in the Baltic States, Moscow, and the Caucasus.

In the spring of 1980 Kyrychenko took out a new poem by Mykola Rudenko on a date with her husband, and in January of the same year she handed over to the United States a manuscript of V. Stus's collection of poems Palimpsests. On December 9, 1980, she was sentenced to three months in prison for refusing to testify at the new trial of Vasyl Stus.

On April 20, 1983, in protest against the persecution of the family (her son was expelled from the institute, he was demanded to renounce his father at a Komsomol meeting; the school administration had "educational talks" with his schoolgirl daughter about "anti-Soviet" parents) she declared a hunger strike and informed about it in a telegram the General Secretary of the CPSU Central Committee Yuri Andropov. Two weeks later, the rector revoked the order to expel his son.

From 1986 to 1988, Kyrychenko and her husband were in exile in the Yakut village of Khandyga.

After returning to Kyiv, Kyrycheko took an active part in the processes of national revival, worked in the secretariat of the Democratic Party of Ukraine.

In 1993, she suffered a severe stroke, a disabled person of group I.

On November 5, 2013, the Kyiv Teachers' House hosted a presentation of Svitlana Kyrychenko's book of memoirs "People not out of fear".

Svitlana Kyrychenko died on 22 April 2016 in Kyiv.

== Awards ==
- Order of Princess Olga III class (January 16, 2009) — "for significant personal contribution to the consolidation of Ukrainian society, building a democratic, social and legal state and on the occasion of the Day of Unity of Ukraine".
