= Liberalism in Ukraine =

This article gives an overview of liberalism in Ukraine. It is limited to liberal parties with substantial support, mainly proved by having had a representation in parliament. The Ukrainian Democratic Party was one of the dominant forces in pre-revolutionary Russian Ukraine. Due to the splintered party system in Ukraine, the timeline is limited to the post-1990 period.

== History ==
In the mid-1990s, the Liberal Party of Ukraine (Liberalna Partia, observer LI) formed out of small parties in Crimea. The Yulia Tymoshenko Bloc seemed to develop into a more or less liberal party. The UDAR, which as of 2013 holds 42 seats in the Verkhovna Rada, has been described as a "Western-style liberal party". Other, small liberal parties include Liberal Democratic Party of Ukraine, Reforms and Order Party, PORA and Yabluko. Also, the Democratic Party of Ukraine and the Democratic Union have sometimes been referred as liberal parties, though their liberal nature has not been confirmed.

=== Ukrainian Radical Democratic Party ===
- 1905: Inspired by the ideas of Michailo Drahomanov, sympathizers of the Russian Constitutional Democratic Party in Ukraine formed the liberal Ukrainian Radical Democratic Party (Ukrajin'ska Radikal'no-Demokratyčna Partija).
- 1908: The party is reorganized into the Ukrainian Progressive League (Tovarystvo Ukraijins'kych Progresystov), which became the dominant party.
- 1917: The party is renamed "Ukrainian Party of Federalist Socialists" (Ukrajin'ska Partija Federalistiv-Socialistiv), which was, despite its name, a liberal democratic party led by Serhij Jefremov. He did not survive the anti-Ukrainian processes by the communist regime. In exile, the party was renamed into its original name, the Ukrainian Radical Democratic Party.

== Liberal leaders ==
- Serhij Jefremov
- Yurii Hudymenko
- Viktor Yushchenko, President of Ukraine from 2005 to 2010, Prime Minister of Ukraine from 1999 to 2001
- Volodymyr Zelenskyy, President of Ukraine since 2019
- Yulia Tymoshenko, Prime Minister of Ukraine in 2005 and from 2007 to 2010

== See also ==
- History of Ukraine
- Politics of Ukraine
- List of political parties in Ukraine
