= Boryslav Bereza =

Ukrainian politician

- Борислав Береза
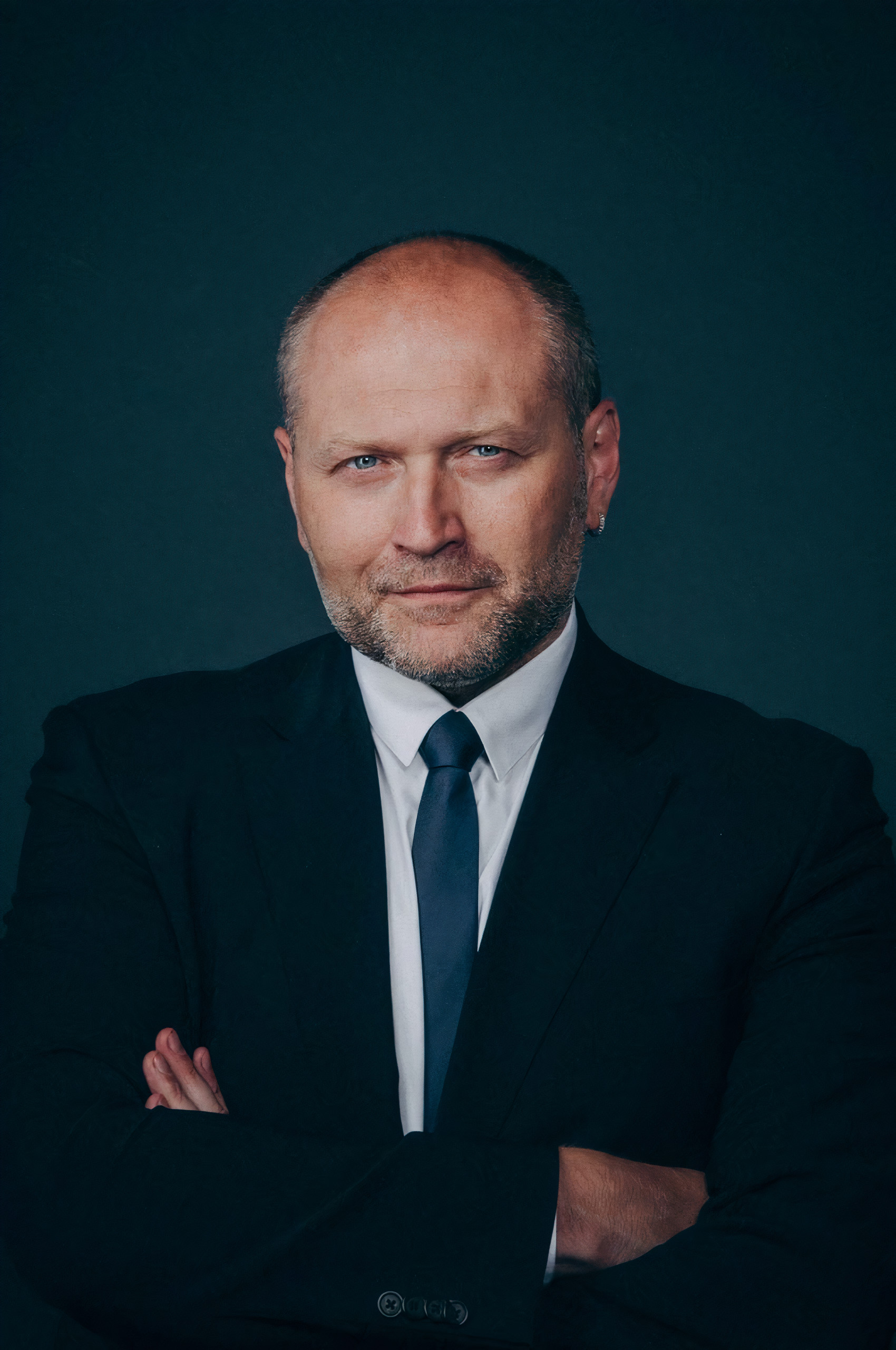

People's Deputy of Ukraine
- In office 5 November 2014 – 29 July 2019
- Preceded by: Volodymyr Yavorivsky
- Succeeded by: Artem Dubnov
- Constituency: Kyiv, No. 213

Personal details
- Born: 13 June 1974 (age 51) Kyiv, Ukrainian SSR, Soviet Union (now Ukraine)
- Party: UKROP

Boryslav Yukhymovych Bereza (Ukrainian: Борислав Юхимович Береза; born 13 June 1974) is a former member of the Ukrainian parliament and a former spokesperson for Right Sector (2014). In the 2019 Ukrainian parliamentary election he lost reelection as an independent candidate in a single-seat constituency.

== Biography ==
Bereza was born on 13 June 1974 in Kyiv. He claims he is a graduate of the Kyiv National Economic University, but the university claims that this is not the case.

In 1991, after the fall of the Soviet Union, he moved to Israel, where he lived until 1993. He identifies himself as a Jew and a Cohen but not an ethnic Ukrainian.

Upon his return to Ukraine, Bereza was a Russian book dealer and publisher and eventually created his own small literary society. At the same time he also worked as a television host for the First National Channel as well as a radio host at the Prosto Radio (Simply Radio).

On 2 March 2009, in Troieshchyna, while driving a vehicle, Bereza hit two pedestrians, but escaped responsibility by changing his surname from Bliakher-Bereza to Bereza. This was done despite the fact that the legislation of Ukraine does not allow changing the data of those under investigation.

From February to December 2014, Bereza served as a spokesperson for the political party Right Sector, while not officially being a member of it. He participated in some events of the Euromaidan.

In the fall of 2014 Bereza participated in the Ukrainian parliamentary election running as an independent candidate and winning at the 213th electoral district in Kyiv's Desnianskyi District with 29.44% of the votes. Runner up in the district Anatoli Karpenko gained 22.51% of the votes. After the elections, already as a People's Deputy of Ukraine he announced the creation of an inter-factional parliamentary group titled "Ukrop" (a portmanteau for the Ukrainian opposition). In the Verkhovna Rada (Ukrainian parliament) he joined the inter-factional group UKROP.

In April 2015, the Ukrainian media reported on the scandal between Bereza and the deputy from the Radical Party Ihor Mosiychuk.

In the 2015 local elections Bereza was the candidate for Mayor of Kyiv for Party of Decisive Citizens (Ukrainian: Партія рішучих громадян). He made it through to the second round of Mayoral elections between him and incumbent Mayor Vitali Klitschko after Klitschko scored 40.5% of the vote and Bereza 8.8% in the first round. Klitschko won this second round with 66.5%; Bereza gained 33.51% of the votes.

In September 2016, Bereza had a row with "Television news service" journalists.

On 9 May 2017, he made a scandal with a police officer during the "Immortal Regiment" in Kyiv (Beryoza was among those who tried to prevent it from being carried out).

On 24 January 2019 on the sidelines of the PACE, during a briefing by the Deputy Speaker of the Rada, Iryna Herashchenko, he pushed the journalist of the Russia-1 TV channel Olga Skabeyeva, since she, in his opinion, interfered with Herashchenko's speech. The head of Chechnya, Ramzan Kadyrov, reacted to Bereza's act, demanding an apology from him to Skabeyeva, threatening to slap him in the face.

In the July 2019 Ukrainian parliamentary election Bereza tried to win back his seat in the 213th electoral district. But he failed to achieve this goal. As an independent politician he placed third with 17.96% of the votes. The district was won by Artem Dubnov of the Servant of the People party with 36.27% of the votes. Bereza was the candidate of his own party, the Eco-party (Ukrainian: Екопартія), for the post of Mayor of Kyiv in the 2020 Kyiv local election set for 25 October 2020 and did lead the local Kyiv Ekoparty election list in the same election. Incumbent Mayor Klitschko was re-elected in the first round of this election with 50.52% of the votes, Bereza finished in 10th place with 7.448 votes. Ekoparty won no Kyiv City Council seats and was, with the 17th place in the election, not even close to doing so.

On 10 April 2022, he ended up on the territory of the Truskavets Convent, where he refused to serve a summons to the military enlistment office. Bereza himself claimed that he already had signed on to the Territorial Defense Brigade of Kyiv, and that the incident was an example of negative campaigning.

== Personal life ==
Bereza is married and has three children.
