= Viktor Plakida =

Ukrainian politician

- Віктор Плакіда
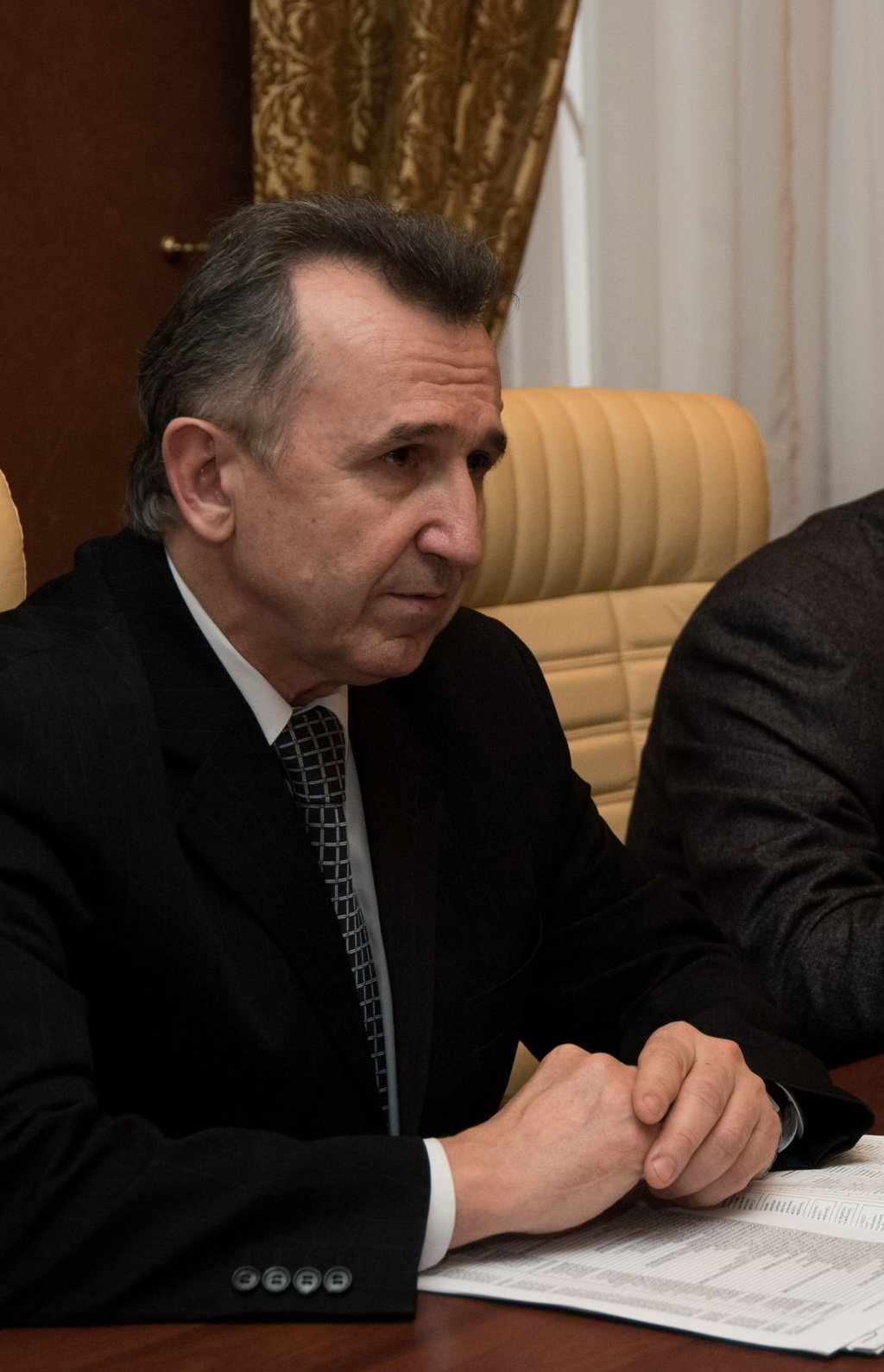
- Plakida in 2015

Representatives of the President of Ukraine in Crimea
- In office 28 February 2012 (acting since 8 June 2011) – 27 February 2014
- President: Viktor Yanukovych
- Preceded by: Volodymyr Yatsuba
- Succeeded by: Serhiy Kunitsyn

Representatives of the President of Ukraine in Crimea (Acting)
- In office 13 October 2010 – 12 January 2011
- President: Viktor Yanukovych
- Preceded by: Serhiy Kunitsyn
- Succeeded by: Volodymyr Yatsuba

Prime Minister of Crimea
- In office 2 June 2006 – 17 March 2010
- President: Viktor Yushchenko
- Preceded by: Anatoliy Burdiuhov
- Succeeded by: Vasyl Dzharty

Personal details
- Born: 2 August 1956 (age 69) Krasnyi Luch, Luhansk Oblast, Ukraine

Viktor Tarasovych Plakida (born 2 August 1956) is a Ukrainian politician and businessman. Plakida served as the Prime Minister of Crimea, an autonomous region in southern Ukraine, from 2006 to 2010 (the office of prime minister is also known as the chairman of the Crimean Council of Ministers). He was the Representatives of the President of Ukraine in Crimea.

== Career ==
Plakida served as the chairman of the Crimean Energy System UkrEnergo before becoming Prime Minister of Crimea.

In early 2006, the Crimean Council of Ministers and the Crimean parliament removed the government of Crimean Prime Minister Anatoliy Burdiuhov. Plakida was nominated as the next prime minister by the Speaker of the Supreme Council of Crimea, which acts as Crimea's parliament. A power struggle ensued between Crimean politicians who were pro-Russian and those loyal to Ukrainian President Viktor Yushchenko. In early May 2006, politicians loyal to Yushchenko joined with four small political parties to create a 76-member majority in the Crimean parliament, which has 100 total members. This majority sought to block any pro-Russian candidates for Prime Minister of Crimea.

The Constitution of Ukraine requires that the country's president approve of any candidate nominated for Prime Minister of Crimea. Ukrainian President Viktor Yushchenko gave his approval after negotiations with Crimean political leaders and end the political impasse. In exchange for Yushchenko's approval of Plakida's candidacy, the Crimean parliament agreed to changes in the structure and membership of the Crimean Council of Ministers. Yushchenko signed off on Plakida's nomination on 29 May 2006.

The Supreme Council of Crimea further approved Plakida as prime minister on 2 June 2006. Plakida received a majority of 75 votes in the parliament out 93 members.

Plakida served as prime minister until March 2010, when he resigned from office. The Crimean parliament voted on 17 March 2010, to accept Plakida's resignation, with 71 members voting to accept his resignation and four voting against. He was succeeded by Vasyl Dzharty.

President Viktor Yanukovych appointed Plakida as his acting presidential representative in Crimea in October 2010. Yanukovych dismissed Plakida in January 2011 in favor of Volodymyr Yatsuba, the former Minister of Regional Development and Construction. On 28 February 2012 Yanukovych appointed Plakida as his acting presidential representative in Crimea again.

Political offices
Preceded by Anatoliy Burdyuhov	Prime Minister of Crimea; 2006–2010	Succeeded by Vasyl Dzharty
Preceded by Volodymyr Kazarin	Presidential representatives in Crimea (Acting); 2010–2011	Succeeded by Volodymyr Yatsuba
Preceded by Volodymyr Yatsuba	Presidential representatives in Crimea (Acting since 8 June 2011); 2012–2014	Succeeded by Serhiy Kunitsyn
