= Party of Democratic Revival of Ukraine =

Ukrainian political party, 1990–1996

Party of Democratic Revival of Ukraine (PDVU; Ukrainian: Партія демократичного відродження України, romanized: Partiia demokratychnoho vidrodzhennia Ukrainy) was a political party in 1990-96 that was created as an offshoot of the Communist Party of the Soviet Union. In 1996 along with number of other parties, it merged into the People's Democratic Party.

== Formation ==
With the beginning of perestroika (movement for transformation) in the USSR and process of glasnost (transparency), democratization of society, discontent was created in the ranks of the Communist Party as an opposition to its conservative party's top. That wing of the Communist Party was the basis of "the Communist Party Democratic Platform" (Demplatform).

Eventually it turned out that all the hopes of improving the situation in the Communist Party were useless, therefore most of the Demplatform in the Communist Party of Ukraine decided to create its party that would be "not a communist and not anti-communist". Twenty-seven members of the Supreme Council of Ukraine signed a joint declaration of secession from CPSU, and particularly the future leaders of PDVU – Volodymyr Hrynyov, Volodymyr Filenko, Oleksandr Yemets.

== Views ==
Former leaders of "Demplatform" became the basis for the formation of the Party of Democratic Revival of Ukraine. They often were accused of being "repainted" communists. But those people, like Myroslav Popovych already were struggling with the party apparatus from the beginning perestroika process. Those were people with certain experience, intellectual baggage. In addition, to the new party came unaffiliated, some anarchists and some former members and SDPU and OSDPU. For example, in Luhansk among members of the party, according to data presented at a congress, there was less than 20% of former communists (in the constituent congress, held in Kiev on December 1–2, 1990, in PDVU there were 2.3 thousand members). Immediately within the party were formed two factions: Social Democratic and Liberal Democratic. But the organizational committee decided that at this difficult time democrats should not disperse their forces.

Both factions set out to transform Ukraine into a "democratic independent state with an effective market economy and social protection of citizens" defended "priority of human rights over the rights of any social and national community and the priority of people rights over the rights of the state".

Uniqueness of PDVU lay in the fact that it even before its Constituent Congress had its parliamentary factions: among the Constituent Congress delegates there were 18 members of the Supreme Council of Ukraine. Almost one in five of the 324 deputies of the Congress was a member of this or that level.

Co-chairmen of the Coordinating Council were elected M. Popovych (one of the founders of the Rukh), V. Hrynyov (Deputy Chairman of the Verkhovna Rada of Ukraine), O. Yemets (Chairman of the Parliamentary Committee on Human Rights), K. Filenko (Deputy Speaker of the National Council), V. Khmelko (vice president of the Sociological Association of Ukraine), S. Lylyk (Lviv historian) and O. Bazylyuk (professor of Donetsk).

This structure, which had to meet all current party carried the negative. In particular, different approaches to a number of problems, such as a national issue. V. Hriniov, who considered himself a liberal- bourgeois politician, argued that "the role of the mother, we did not perform a geographical place, and administrative- command system... The chance to fight it we get only when it does not oppose the national and wider democratic idea "because" administrative system... sufficiently adapted to the national liberation movement and starts to use it to their interests". This is especially manifested August 24, 1991, when V. Hriniov his associates refused to support the Act of Independence of Ukraine to ban the Communist Party. "If we put sovereignty as an end in itself, it can get totalitarian state – argued founder PDVU V. Hriniov in January. It is necessary that the system is burned to ashes".

== Events ==
The biggest event of the end of the 1991–1992 biennium for PDVU was the foundation, the "New Ukraine", and initiated the foundation of which was PDVU. At the end of 1992 in Kiev hosted the conference of social and political organization "New Ukraine". The main goal of creating a "University" was a combination of political influence of party leaders and financial capital businesses. The parties entered into the merger OSDPU the Social Democrats, LSPU, KDP, some of the ROM. Among the business organizations – the Confederation of Ukraine, the Ukrainian League of enterprises with foreign capital and Ukrbank et al. "New Ukraine" defined by its main goal to promote Ukraine market reforms. Reform projects to that time was already prepared by the then Deputy Prime Minister V. Lanovyi. "N.U." established in the Parliament of his faction which came and Kuchma.

But to implement the program V. Lanovyi failed. Scared of radicalism, Vitold Fokin "removed" V. Lanovyi of government. In these circumstances, and I passed Congress "New Ukraine" in June 1992. Apparent heterogeneity of the whole "New Ukraine": some showed themselves Social Democrats, others – as liberals, some – as advocates of full independence of Ukraine, while others wanted to draw her again in neo-imperial structure – whether in the form of CIS, whether various "There is one space". The tension between them nearly led to a split in the Congress I, which won the "Independents" and liberals. "Grand statesmen" that would have its nationwide organization, had to be content with the establishment in Donbas State Congress. These events have shown that the primary intent of the "New Ukraine" – to focus on the economy, abstracting from politics – could not be made. Kuchma, becoming prime minister, came out of parliamentary faction "New Ukraine". His government did not accept V. Lanovyi program, supported by the majority Novoukrainka.

In the I Congress of the "New Ukraine" was chosen chairman Filenko.

Within six months after the Congress in the "New Ukraine" sharp disagreement between the "Independents" and "Grand statesmen". The leader of the "New Ukraine" Filenko union tried to turn on the mobile and efficient batch socially liberal (for electoral success), but because of the many obstacles tsomu failed. This situation has caused the convocation of the Congress II "New Ukraine" held March 13–14 in Kiev. Combining needed reorganization. Save sole leader without the threat of schism and without transformation into a political party was impossible. Therefore, the "New Ukraine" became the coalition parties and other public associations, and regional organizations. Its central authorities are not elected by the Congress and formed by the delegation of representatives of the member organizations of the coalition. Each of the regional organizations, institutions, corporate members create their own parliament.

The biggest controversy started around the election of governing bodies. V. Hriniov been chosen, which indicated the rise of "velykoderzhavnykiv". After that, many observers predicted transition "New Ukraine" to pro-position and possible split in the union and in the PDVU. Immediately after the Congress of "N.U." in Ukrainian Student Union, who said that the election of V. Hriniov dissatisfied with the President of the Association and who "puts the Ukrainian national interests in the foundation of their activity".

Summer of 1993 V. Hriniov resigned as vice-chairman, disagreeing with government policy. Speaking on this occasion, V. Hriniov taken explicitly anti-Ukrainian stance is very struck by the authority of the "New Ukraine ", and in particular PDVU. The process of leaving people with "New Ukraine" and PDVU. For example, urban organization PDVU Svitlovodsk announced the suspension of its activities. Most former members PDVU transferred to the PSA.

In July 1993 at the meeting of Poltava great council "New Ukraine", where V. Hriniov proposed the creation of a strong and effective union party "New Ukraine", practically repeating and supporting Filenko opinion, which he expressed in IV C ' PDVU ride. PDVU fully supported this proposal, and SDPU inclined to certain amendments. LSPU and KDP made an attempt to gather all the opposition forces in a big party fist.

Coming in the "single fist" Novoukrainka failed, V. Hriniov created together with Kuchma Interregional priority area (ICBM ). In the elections of 1994 and BP PDVU deputies had 4 members. While the post-election crisis in, PDVU and "New Ukraine" looking out of this situation because many observers predicted the decline of both organizations, especially after the departure of ICBMs. January 28, 1995 at a joint meeting of the governing bodies of the Labour Congress of Ukraine and the Party of Democratic Revival of Ukraine was established political power TKU – PDVU.

At the end of June in Kiev the IV Congress of the "New Ukraine ", where the main role played by power – TKU PDVU. The congress took place correction program association. Congress showed that the association supports the decentralized unitary state and a bicameral parliament. Was solved and the language problem. Association recognizes the Ukrainian language, the status of international language and medium of official public communication. Combining emphasizing their involvement in the President, took the position very loyal to the executive. By the IV Congress of the "New Ukraine" from the union withdrew almost all small parties, leaving only the Liberal Democrats. The congress was held on LSPU even scandal, because traditionally the governing bodies of the "New Ukraine" elected party leaders, members of the association. But during the election Filenko protested against the election V.Klymchuka leader LSPU to governing bodies. At the head of the Association elected a prominent politician, mayor of Kharkiv, Yevhen Kushnaryov. Was elected Vice-mayor Anatoliy Matviyenko and Filenko. Congress also noted that the union stands for the Social Liberal democracies

Governing bodies are divided into full PDVU (meetings, conferences, conventions) and functional (all other governing bodies). At the highest-level, governing bodies are PDVU Coordinating Council (RC) and the Arbitration and audit committee, as well as scientific and editorial and publishing board. Organizes work parties KR, Presidium Secretariat. Chairman of the Presidium is also chairman of the CD.

== See also ==
- Toiling Congress of Ukraine (TKU)
- People's Democratic Party (Ukraine)
- People's Democratic Union "New Ukraine"
