= Toiling Congress of Ukraine =

Ukrainian political party (1993–1996)

Toiling Congress of Ukraine (TCU) (Ukrainian: Трудовий конгрес України (ТКУ), romanized: Trudovyi konhres Ukrainy (TKU)) was created in 1993 and in 1996 merged into the People's Democratic Party.

The party was created in September 1993 uniting several public association such as the Center "Justice", Union of entrepreneurs, Society of cooperation and others. The leader of the party was elected Anatoliy Matviyenko.

Eventually it united with the Party of Democratic Revival of Ukraine (PDVU) into association "New Ukraine" which eventually was transformed into People's Democratic Party.
