= Block of People's Democratic Parties =

Ukrainian political bloc

Block of People's Democratic Parties "We Know HOW!" (Ukrainian: Блоку народно-демократичних партій "Знаємо ЯК!", romanized: Bloku narodno-demokratichnikh partiy "Znayemo YAK!") was a political alliance that took part in the parliamentary elections in 2006. It did not overcome the 3% threshold (winning only 0.49% of the votes) and therefore won no seats in the Ukrainian Parliament.

The alliance had the following members:

- People's Democratic Party
- Democratic Party of Ukraine
- Christian Democratic Party of Ukraine
- Christian Liberal Party of Ukraine
