= Yuriy Kryvoruchko (politician) =

Ukrainian politician

- Юрій Криворучко
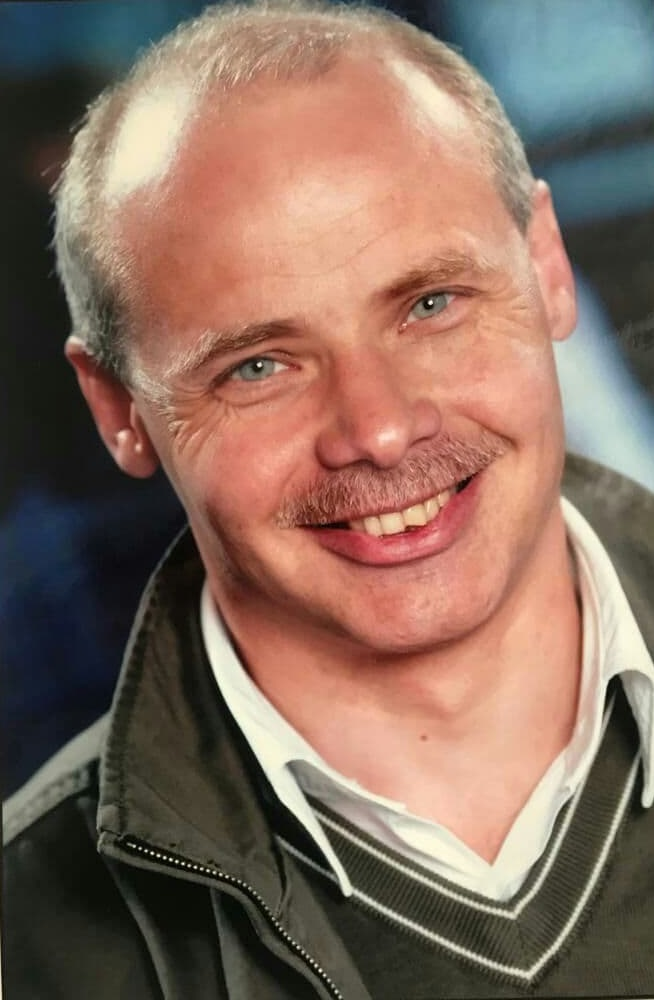
- Kryvoruchko in 2008

People's Deputy of Ukraine
- In office 16 March 2005 – 25 May 2006
- Constituency: Our Ukraine Bloc, No. 83
- In office 12 May 1998 – 14 May 2002
- Preceded by: Constituency established
- Succeeded by: Taras Stetskiv
- Constituency: Lviv Oblast, No. 118

Personal details
- Born: 14 July 1966 (age 60) Lviv, Ukrainian SSR, Soviet Union (now Ukraine)
- Party: People's Movement of Ukraine
- Other political affiliations: Social-National Party of Ukraine
- Education: Danylo Halytsky Lviv National Medical University (1989); Lviv University (1998)
- Occupation: Psychiatrist, jurist

Yuriy Zenoviiovych Kryvoruchko (Ukrainian: Юрій Зеновійович Криворучко; born 14 July 1966) is a Ukrainian politician and activist who served as a People's Deputy of Ukraine from Ukraine's 118th electoral district (located in Lviv Oblast from 1998 to 2002, and later as a People's Deputy from the proportional list of the Our Ukraine Bloc from 2005 to 2006.

== Early life and education ==
Yuriy Kryvoruchko was born on 14 July 1966, in Lviv. In 1989 he graduated from the Lviv Medical Institute with a degree in psychiatry.

From 1992 to 1998 he studied at the Faculty of Law of the University of Lviv. In 2005 he obtained Candidate of Sciences degree.

== Activism ==
While still studying at the institute in 1988, he was elected as chairman of the faculty branch of the Ukrainian Language Society, which was engaged in advocating for teaching in the Ukrainian language.

In 1989 he took part in the creation of People's Movement of Ukraine. In 1990 he participated in the Revolution on Granite.

From 1990 to 1992 Kryvoruchko was head of the paramilitary organization "Guard of the Movement". In 1991, he took part in the January Events in Lithuania as a volunteer and organizer of humanitarian aid.

Since 1992, Kryvoruchko has been chairman of the board of the Young Ukraine Foundation.

== Political career ==
In 1991, together with Yaroslav Andrushkiv, Andriy Parubiy and Oleh Tyahnybok, he founded the Social National Party of Ukraine (SNPU). Yuriy Kryvoruchko was a public leader and was responsible for ideological work.

In 1992 he served as a senior officer in the Department of Psychology of the Social and Psychological Department of the Ministry of Defense of Ukraine.

From 1994 to 1997 he was serving as a member of the Lviv Oblast Council of the II democratic convocation.

In 1997 he left the SNPU without conflicts due to a different vision of its development with the leadership and joined the People's Movement of Ukraine.

Kryvoruchko was elected to the Verkhovna Rada (parliament of Ukraine) in the 1998 Ukrainian parliamentary election. He was re-elected in 2002.

From 1995 to 2009 he was a member of the National Council for Youth Policy. Since 2003 he has held the position of Deputy Chairman of the National Council of Youth Organizations of Ukraine, and since 2004 - Deputy Chairman of the Ukrainian National Committee of Youth Organizations.

He took part in the 2004 Orange Revolution. In 2006 he became the chairman of the Ukrainian Youth Forum.

== Awards ==
- 1999: Third Class of the Order of Merit of Ukraine
- 2008: Second Class of the Order of Merit of Ukraine
- 2020: The Medal of January 13
