= Prime Minister of Crimea =

Head of government of the Autonomous Republic of Crimea and Republic of Crimea

Chairman of the Council of Ministers of Republic of Crimea
- Coat of arms of Crimea

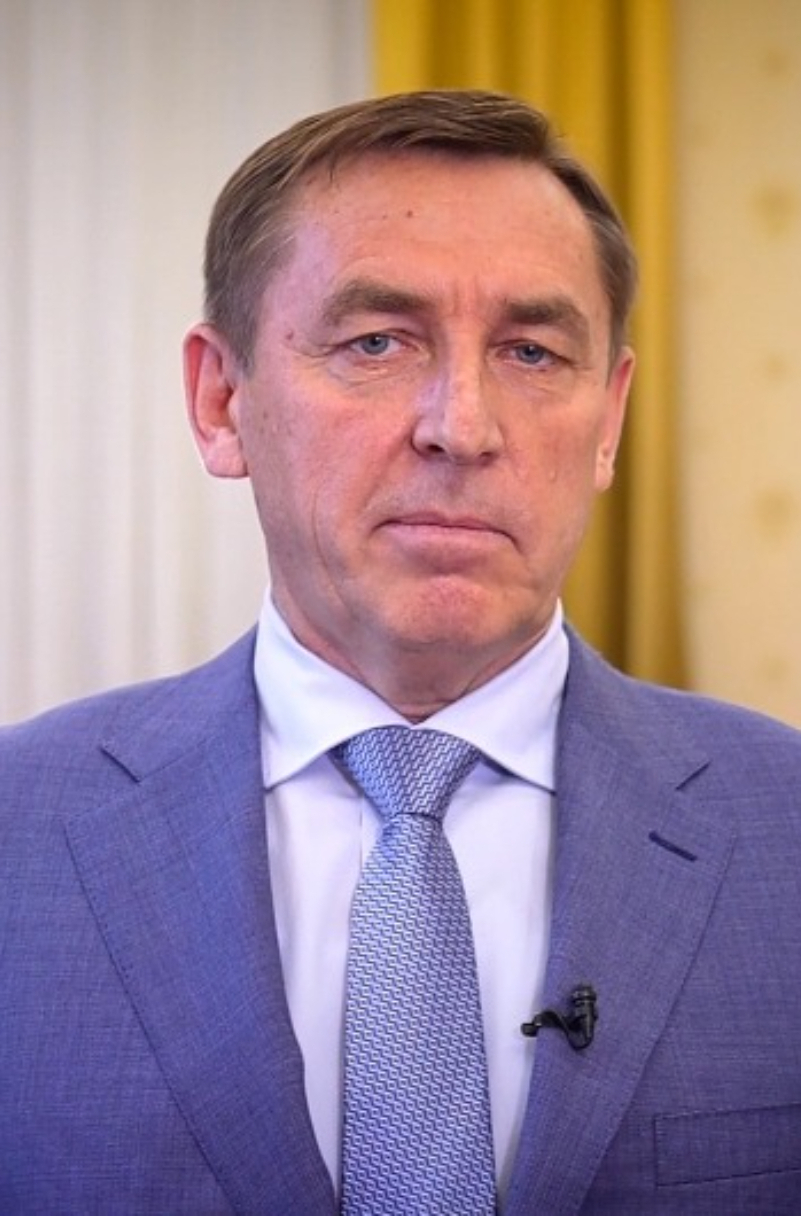
- Incumbent; Yury Gotsanyuk since 1 October 2019
- Nominator: Head of the Republic of Crimea
- Appointer: State Council of Crimea
- Term length: 5 years
- Inaugural holder: Vitaliy Kurashyk (in 1991); Sergey Aksyonov (in 2014)
- Formation: March 22, 1991 (as Prime Minister of Autonomous Republic of Crimea (in Ukraine)); March 18, 2014 (as Prime Minister of Republic of Crimea (in Russia))
- Deputy: Deputy Prime Minister of Crimea

The chairman of the Council of Ministers of the Republic of Crimea (prime minister of Crimea), is the head of government of the Republic of Crimea.

Until 2014, the position was called the Prime Minister of Crimea (ARC), whose nomination was proposed by the Speaker of the Verkhovna Rada of Crimea (Crimean parliament) with the approval of the President of Ukraine and then the Crimean parliament, presided over the Council of Ministers of Crimea.

Prime minister has been appointed by the head of the Republic of Crimea, once a candidate for the prime minister has been approved by the State Council of Crimea (Crimean parliament). The head of the Republic of Crimea could lead the Council of Ministers of Crimea, but he must also be approved by the State Council.

After March 2014, the position of Chairman of the Council of Ministers of the Republic of Crimea was established.

== List ==
=== Autonomous Republic of Crimea ===
Independent
Republican Party of Crimea
Agrarian Party of Ukraine
People's Party of Crimea
People's Democratic Party
Ukrainian Platform "Sobor"
Our Ukraine
Party of Regions
Labour Ukraine

#	Portrait	Name (Birth–Death)	Term of office		Political Party	Legislature (Election)	Presidential representative
1		Vitaliy Kurashyk (born in 1939)	22 March 1991	20 May 1993	Independent	I (1991)	Vacant (1992–1994)
2		Borys Samsonov (1938–2014)	20 May 1993	4 February 1994	Independent	I (1991)	Vacant (1992–1994)
3		Yuriy Meshkov (1945–2019)	4 February 1994	6 October 1994 (Note: Promoted himself to become the President of Crimea.)	Republican Party of Crimea (Electoral Bloc "Rossiya")	II (1994)	Valeriy Horbatov (1994–1996)
4		Anatoliy Franchuk (1935–2021)	6 October 1994	22 March 1995	People's Party of Crimea (Electoral Bloc "Rossiya")	II (1994)	Valeriy Horbatov (1994–1996)
5		Anatoliy Drobotov (born in 1951)	22 March 1995	31 March 1995 (Note: Not recognized by Ukraine.)	Republican Party of Crimea (Electoral Bloc "Rossiya")	II (1994)	Valeriy Horbatov (1994–1996)
6		Anatoliy Franchuk (1935–2021)	31 March 1995	26 January 1996	People's Party of Crimea (Electoral Bloc "Rossiya")	II (1994)	Valeriy Horbatov (1994–1996)
7		Arkadiy Demydenko (1950–2005)	26 January 1996	4 June 1997	Independent	II (1994)	Dmytro Stepanyuk (1996–1997)
7		Arkadiy Demydenko (1950–2005)	26 January 1996	4 June 1997	Independent	II (1994)	Vasyl Kiselyov (1997–1999)
8		Anatoliy Franchuk (1935–2021)	4 June 1997	27 May 1998	People's Party of Crimea (Electoral Bloc "Rossiya")	II (1994)	Vasyl Kiselyov (1997–1999)
9		Serhiy Kunitsyn (born in 1960)	27 May 1998	25 July 2001	People's Democratic Party (Electoral Bloc of Kunitsyn)	II (1998)	Vasyl Kiselyov (1997–1999)
9		Serhiy Kunitsyn (born in 1960)	27 May 1998	25 July 2001	People's Democratic Party (Electoral Bloc of Kunitsyn)	II (1998)	Anatoliy Korniychuk (1999–2002)
10		Valeriy Horbatov (born in 1955)	25 July 2001	29 April 2002	Independent	II (1998)	Anatoliy Korniychuk (1999–2002)
11		Serhiy Kunitsyn (born in 1960)	29 April 2002	20 April 2005	People's Democratic Party (Electoral Bloc of Kunitsyn)	III (2002)	Oleksandr Didenko (2002–2005)
12		Anatoliy Matviienko (1953-2020)	20 April 2005	21 September 2005	Ukrainian Platform "Sobor"	III (2002)	Oleksandr Didenko (2002–2005)
13		Anatoliy Burdiuhov (born in 1958)	23 September 2005	2 June 2006	Our Ukraine	III (2002)	Volodymyr Kulish (2005–2006)
14		Viktor Plakida (born in 1956)	2 June 2006	17 March 2010	Party of Regions	IV (2006)	Hennadiy Moskal (2006–2007)
14		Viktor Plakida (born in 1956)	2 June 2006	17 March 2010	Party of Regions	IV (2006)	Vacant (2007)
14		Viktor Plakida (born in 1956)	2 June 2006	17 March 2010	Party of Regions	IV (2006)	Viktor Shemchuk (2007)
14		Viktor Plakida (born in 1956)	2 June 2006	17 March 2010	Party of Regions	IV (2006)	Volodymyr Khomenko (2007)
14		Viktor Plakida (born in 1956)	2 June 2006	17 March 2010	Party of Regions	IV (2006)	Vacant (2008)
14		Viktor Plakida (born in 1956)	2 June 2006	17 March 2010	Party of Regions	IV (2006)	Leonid Zhunko (2008–2010)
15		Vasyl Dzharty (1958–2011)	17 March 2010	17 August 2011	Party of Regions	V (2010)	Serhiy Kunitsyn (2010)
15		Vasyl Dzharty (1958–2011)	17 March 2010	17 August 2011	Party of Regions	V (2010)	Vacant (2010)
15		Vasyl Dzharty (1958–2011)	17 March 2010	17 August 2011	Party of Regions	V (2010)	Volodymyr Yatsuba (2011)
15		Vasyl Dzharty (1958–2011)	17 March 2010	17 August 2011	Party of Regions	V (2010)	Viktor Plakida (acting in 2011)
-		Pavlo Burlakov (born in 1963)	17 August 2011	8 November 2011	Party of Regions	V (2010)	Viktor Plakida (acting in 2011)
16		Anatolii Mohyliov (born in 1955)	8 November 2011	27 February 2014	Party of Regions	V (2010)	Viktor Plakida (acting in 2011–2012)
16		Anatolii Mohyliov (born in 1955)	8 November 2011	27 February 2014	Party of Regions	V (2010)	Viktor Plakida (2012–2014)

=== Crimea (in 2014) ===
Russian Unity

#	Portrait	Name (Birth–Death)	Term of office		Political Party
-		Sergey Aksyonov (Note: Installed during the annexation of Crimea by the Russian Federation and not approved by the President of Ukraine.) (born in 1972)	27 February 2014	17 March 2014	Russian Unity

=== Republic of Crimea (from 2014) ===
United Russia

#	Portrait	Name (Birth–Death)	Term of office		Political Party	Legislature (Election)	Head of Republic
1 (17)		Sergey Aksyonov (born in 1972)	17 March 2014	9 September 2014	United Russia	Vacant	Sergey Aksyonov (since 2014)
1 (17)		Sergey Aksyonov (born in 1972)	9 September 2014	20 September 2019	United Russia	I (2014)	Sergey Aksyonov (since 2014)
2 (18)		Yury Gotsanyuk (born in 1966)	20 September 2019	1 October 2019	United Russia	II (2019)	Sergey Aksyonov (since 2014)
2 (18)		Yury Gotsanyuk (born in 1966)	1 October 2019	Incumbent	United Russia	II (2019)	Sergey Aksyonov (since 2014)

== See also ==
- List of Chairmen of the Executive Committee of Crimea
