= Anatoliy Burdiuhov =

Ukrainian politician and banker

- Анатолій Бурдюгов

Prime Minister of Crimea
- In office 21 September 2005 – 2006
- Preceded by: Anatoliy Matviyenko
- Succeeded by: Viktor Plakida

Personal details
- Born: November 9, 1958 (age 67)
- Party: Our Ukraine
- Education: Odessa Institute of People's Economy

Anatoliy Fedorovych Burdiuhov (Ukrainian: Анатолій Федорович Бурдюгов; born 9 November 1958) is a Ukrainian politician and banker. He served as Prime Minister of Crimea from 2005 to 2006 under President Viktor Yushchenko, and as a People's Deputy of Ukraine from 1994 to 1995 representing Yushchenko's party Our Ukraine.

== Early life ==
Burdiuhov was born in 1958 in Chistovodne, which was located in the Odesa Oblast of the Ukrainian SSR. In 1983, he graduated from the Odessa Institute of People's Economy, qualifying him for the profession of economist specializing in finance and credit. After graduating, he worked as the Deputy Governor of the Black Sea Branch of the State Bank of the USSR and then as Deputy Manager of the Chornomorske branch of the state bank. Until 1993, he was then the manager of the Sovietskyi branch of Agroprombank. According to Burdiuhov, this was around the time he started a professional relationship with future President Viktor Yushchenko.

From 1993 to the time he was chosen as Prime Minister, he was the Head of the Main Directorate of the National Bank of Ukraine in the Autonomous Republic of Crimea. He was also from 1994 to 2005 a deputy of the Verkhovna Rada for AR Crimea, representing Yushchenko's party Our Ukraine.

From 2005 to 2006 he was Prime Minister of Crimea. He was chosen as the Prime Minister of Crimea, according to him, because he was a long-term Crimean MP who was familiar to local elites and presented himself as a consensus builder. Upon being appointed, he criticized former PM Anatoliy Matviyenko's approach to Crimea and the scandal around the land allocation for golf-city, but supported developing Crimea's tourism sector but rejected any big projects.

After serving in this position Chairman of the Exchange Council of the Commodity Exchange "Crimean Interbank Currency Exchange" and Director of the International investment Promotion Fund for southern Ukraine. Since 2009, he had been the Head of the Crimean Regional Department of OJSC Sberbank.

Preceded by Anatoliy Matviyenko	Prime Minister of Crimea; 2005–2006	Succeeded by Viktor Plakida
