= Republican Christian Party =

Political party in Ukraine

The Republican Christian Party (Ukrainian: Республiканська Християнська партія, romanized: Respublikanska Khrystyianska partiia) is a political party in Ukraine registered July 1997.

== History ==
The party ran independently at the 1998 Ukrainian parliamentary election winning 0.54% and no seats.

At the legislative elections of 30 March 2002, the party was part of the Viktor Yushchenko Bloc Our Ukraine. It did not participate in the 2006 Ukrainian parliamentary election. In the 30 September 2007 elections, the party failed as part of the Ukrainian Regional Asset to win parliamentary representation.

During the 2010 Ukrainian local elections the party won 1 representatives in the Lviv Oblast Council (regional parliament). In the council of Lviv the party won 3 seats.

The party did not participate in the 2012 parliamentary elections. And again did not participate in the 2014 Ukrainian parliamentary election.
