= Oleksandr Hudyma (politician) =

Ukrainian politician

- Олександр Гудима
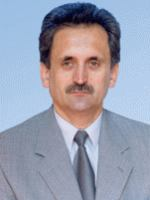
- Official portrait, 2007

People's Deputy of Ukraine
- In office 25 May 2007 – 12 December 2012
- Constituency: Yulia Tymoshenko Bloc, No. 160
- In office 12 May 1998 – 25 May 2006
- Preceded by: Constituency established (1998); Oleh Tiahnybok (2002)
- Succeeded by: Volodymyr Yavorivsky (2002); Constituency abolished (2006)
- Constituency: Lviv Oblast, No. 123 (1998–2002); Lviv Oblast, No. 119 (2002–2006)

Personal details
- Born: 26 June 1950 (age 76) Rozdil, Ukrainian SSR, Soviet Union (now Ukraine)
- Party: Batkivshchyna (since 2007)
- Other political affiliations: People's Movement of Ukraine (until 2000); Ukrainian People's Party (2000–2007); Our Ukraine Bloc (2002–2005)
- Education: Lviv Polytechnic (KEkN

Oleksandr Mykolaiovych Hudyma (Ukrainian: Олекса́ндр Микола́йович Гуди́ма; born 26 June 1950) is a Ukrainian politician who served as a People's Deputy of Ukraine from Lviv Oblast from 1998 to 2006 and on the proportional list of the Yulia Tymoshenko Bloc from 2007 to 2012. He is additionally an expert on nuclear energy.

== Early life and career ==
Oleksandr Mykolaiovych Hudyma was born 26 June 1950 in the urban-type settlement of Rozdil, in Ukraine's western Lviv Oblast. He graduated from Lviv Polytechnic in 1972, specialising in engineering. After his graduation, he worked at the state-owned energy company Lvivenerho from 1972 until 1995, except for a brief period in which he advised the government of the Czechoslovak Socialist Republic on nuclear power plants. During the 1990s Hudyma was a member of several local non-governmental organisations, advocating for the revival of the Ukrainian cooperative movement and changes to energy policies. He was also involved in the restoration of the Ukrainian Greek Catholic Saint Sophia Church in Lviv.

== Political career ==
Hudyma joined the People's Movement of Ukraine (abbreviated Rukh from its Ukrainian-language name, Narodnyi rukh Ukrainy) in 1989 and served as chairman of its Lviv Regional Organisation from 1994 to 1998. He was also a member of the presidium of the Central Provid from 1995 to 1997 and the Central Provid itself from 1994 to 1998.

=== People's Deputy of Ukraine ===
Hudyma was a candidate for People's Deputy of Ukraine in the 1998 Ukrainian parliamentary election, running in Ukraine's 123rd electoral district from Rukh. He was successfully elected with 27.48% of the vote against 15 opponents. In the Verkhovna Rada (parliament of Ukraine), Hudyma was a member of the Privatisation Control Commission, as well as chairman of the nuclear policy subcommittee on the Committee on the Fuel and Energy Complex, Nuclear Policy and Nuclear Security until February 2000, when he was appointed to be chair of the entire committee.

During the split in Rukh, Hudyma sided with Yuriy Kostenko and joined the Ukrainian People's Movement (later the Ukrainian People's Party). During the 2002 Ukrainian parliamentary election he was elected in Ukraine's 119th electoral district from the Our Ukraine Bloc, garnering 28.74% of the vote with 18 opponents. He was chair of the Gas Industry Subcommittee within the Committee on the Fuel and Energy Complex.

Hudyma was an unsuccessful candidate on the proportional list of the Ukrainian National Bloc of Kostenko and Plyushch during the 2006 Ukrainian parliamentary election and from 2006 to 2007 served in the Lviv Oblast Council. He returned to the Verkhovna Rada in the 2007 Ukrainian parliamentary election on the list of the Yulia Tymoshenko Bloc, after having joined the Batkivshchyna party that year.

== Other activities ==
Hudyma defended his Candidate of Sciences dissertation in 2000, and is the founder and head editor of the Journal of Energy Policy of Ukraine. He was awarded the Order of Merit in 2005.
