= Vasyl Dzharty =

Ukrainian politician (1958–2011)

- Василь Джарти
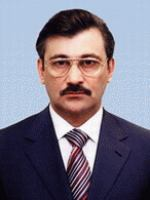
- Official portrait, 2007

Prime Minister of Crimea
- In office 17 March 2010 – 17 August 2011
- President: Viktor Yanukovych
- Preceded by: Viktor Plakida
- Succeeded by: Anatolii Mohyliov

Minister of Natural Environment Protection
- In office 4 August 2006 – 18 December 2007
- Prime Minister: Viktor Yanukovych
- Preceded by: Pavlo Ihnatenko
- Succeeded by: Heorhiy Filipchuk

Mayor of Makiivka
- In office January 2000 – November 2002
- Governor: Viktor Yanukovych

Personal details
- Born: 3 June 1958 Rozdolne, Starobesheve Raion, Donetsk Oblast, Ukrainian SSR, Soviet Union (now Ukraine)
- Died: 17 August 2011 (aged 53) Yalta, Autonomous Republic of Crimea, Ukraine
- Party: Party of Regions
- Education: Donetsk National Technical University; Donetsk National University of Economics and Trade

Vasyl Heorhiyovych Dzharty (Ukrainian: Василь Георгійович Джарти; 3 June 1958 – 17 August 2011) was a Ukrainian politician who served as Prime Minister of Crimea from 17 March 2010 until his death in August 2011.

== Early life and career ==
Dzharty was born in 1958, in Rozdolne, a village in the Starobesheve district of Donetsk Oblast in what was then the Ukrainian Soviet Socialist Republic. His father was a miner.

He completed his studies at Donetsk Polytechnic Institute. He then obtained a master's degree from Donetsk National Technical University in public administration.

== Political career ==
Dzharty served as the Donetsk Oblast's first deputy governor. He then became Mayor of Makiivka, a city in the Donetsk Oblast of Ukraine. He was elected to the Verkhovna Rada, Ukraine's national parliament, serving during its fifth and sixth sessions as a member of the Party of Regions. From 2006 to 2007, Dzharty served as Ukraine's Minister of Ecology and Natural Resources.

== Prime Minister of Crimea ==
Dzharty became the Prime Minister of Crimea on 17 March 2010, succeeding outgoing Prime Minister Viktor Plakida. The Speaker of the Supreme Council of Crimea, Volodymyr Konstantinov, had nominated Dzharty, a member of the Party of Regions, as Crimea's next prime minister and chairman of the council of ministers. As required by the Ukrainian Constitution, the President of Ukraine, Viktor Yanukovych, had to personally approve of Dzharty's nomination, which he did. The Supreme Council of Crimea, which acts as Crimea's parliament, overwhelmingly approved Dzharty's nomination on March 17, 2011. 82 out of the 89 members of the Crimean parliament voted in favor of Dzharty's appointment as Prime Minister. Dzharty simultaneously served as chairman of the Crimean branch of the Party of Regions.

Dzharty was diagnosed with lung cancer in 2010. He sought treatment for the disease in Ukraine, Germany and Russia. Dzharty died from lung cancer in Yalta on August 17, 2011, at the age of 53. He was interred at Kozatske cemetery in the city of Makiivka, Donetsk Oblast, Ukraine, on August 18, 2011. A memorial service was also held in Simferopol. On November 7, 2011 President Viktor Yanukovych appointed Anatolii Mohyliov as his successor as Prime Minister of Crimea.

== Accusations of criminal activity ==
According to the Minister of Internal Affairs Yuriy Lutsenko, in the 1990s Dzharty headed the Makiivka gang and was known in a criminal world as "Vasia the Bat" for his proficiency with a baseball bat in racketeering.
