= Anatolii Mohyliov =

Ukrainian politician (born 1955)

- Анатолій Могильов
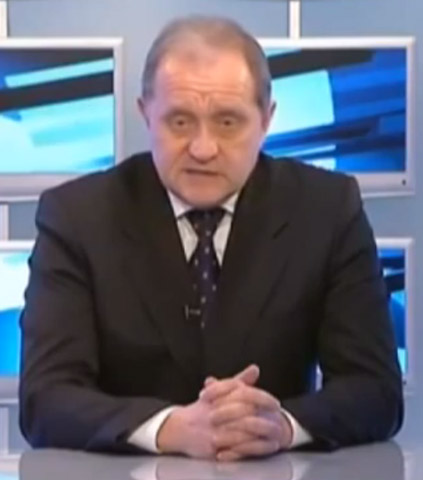
- Mohyliov in 2014

Prime Minister of Crimea
- In office 8 November 2011 – 27 February 2014
- President: Viktor Yanukovych
- Preceded by: Vasyl Dzharty
- Succeeded by: Sergey Aksyonov

Minister of Internal Affairs
- In office 11 March 2010 – 7 November 2011
- Prime Minister: Mykola Azarov
- Preceded by: Yuriy Lutsenko (contested)
- Succeeded by: Vitaliy Zakharchenko

Personal details
- Born: 6 April 1955 (age 71) Petropavlovsk-Kamchatsky, Russian SFSR, Soviet Union
- Party: Party of Regions party "Independence"

Anatolii Volodymyrovych Mohyliov (Ukrainian: Анатолій Володимирович Могильов; Russian: Анатолий Владимирович Могилёв; (Note: Russian romanization: Anatoly Vladimirovich Mogilyov) born 6 April 1955) is a Ukrainian politician. He served as the prime minister of Crimea and the Ukrainian minister of Internal Affairs.

== Politics ==
Mohyliov graduated school in Slovyansk in 1972 and the Slovyansk Pedagogical Institute (today part of the Donbas State Pedagogical University) in 1977 obtaining diploma as a teacher of physics. In 1977–79 he worked as a teacher of physics in a village of Tsvitochne (Bilohirsk Raion, Crimean Oblast) before being drafted to the army. In 1979–81 Mohyliov served in the air defense service for the Leningrad Military District. After demobilization, he for a brief stint returned to be a teacher in Slovyansk, before changing occupation to law enforcement (militsiya) in 1982.

In 1995–2000 Mohyliov served as a chief militsiya officer for the city of Artemivsk and then until 2005 for the city of Makiivka. In 2007, he served as deputy interior minister and chief of the Ukrainian Interior Ministry's main office (head of militsiya) in the Autonomous Republic of Crimea. (Despite Ukrainian policeman are forbidden to be actively involved with politics) Mohyliov headed the Crimean campaign headquarters of presidential candidate Viktor Yanukovych during the 2010 presidential election campaign.

On 16 March 2010 Mustafa Dzhemilev reminded the Minister of Internal Affairs of Anatolii Mohyliov official xenophobic statements in the local press against the Crimean Tatar population in the past for which the Mejlis (Crimean Tatar parliament) has already prepared a petition to the Prosecutor General of Ukraine. If they fail to condemn Mohyliov's statements, the Mejlis will consider filing in a complaint with the European Court of Human Rights in Strasbourg. The Kharkiv Human Rights Protection Group has criticized his period as Interior Minister.

A resolution on the dismissal of Mohyliov did not receive enough votes (141 out of 450) in the Verkhovna Rada on 15 June 2010.

On 7 November 2011 President Viktor Yanukovych nominated Mohyliov as Prime Minister of Crimea. The Supreme Council of Crimea appointed him to this post the next day. Mustafa Dzhemilev described his appointment "stupid; Mohyliov is remembered for praising the Stalin-era deportations of the Crimean Tatars, as well as the shooting of unarmed people in 2007 by police under his command". Mohyliov was elected the leader of the Crimean branch of Party of Regions on 29 November 2011.

On 18 November 2012 Anatoliy Mohiliov openly stated that Militsiya of Ukraine "supports interests of the political force that currently is in power (government), because the power (government) ensures stability and normal life in the country."

On February 27, 2014, he was released from the Chairman of the Council of Ministers of the Autonomous Republic of Crimea, Deputy of the Crimean Parliament Sergey Aksenov was elected to this position.

== Racist comments ==
Mohyliov has been criticized for making a variety of Tatarophobic comments, to an extent that he was put in the list of the 14 most prominent Tatarophobes by Avdet for praising the deportation of the Crimean Tatars and calling them "sub-human". Earlier, he claimed that a fairly large diaspora of Crimean Tatars inhabit Crimea, perpetrating the notion that they are foreigners in their homeland.

== Notes ==
Political offices
Preceded by Yuriy Lutsenko	Minister of Internal Affairs; 2010–2011	Succeeded by Vitaliy Zakharchenko
Preceded by Vasyl Dzharty	Prime Minister of Crimea; 2011–2014	Succeeded by Sergey Aksyonov
