= Election Bloc Liudmyla Suprun – Ukrainian Regional Asset =

Political alliance in Ukraine

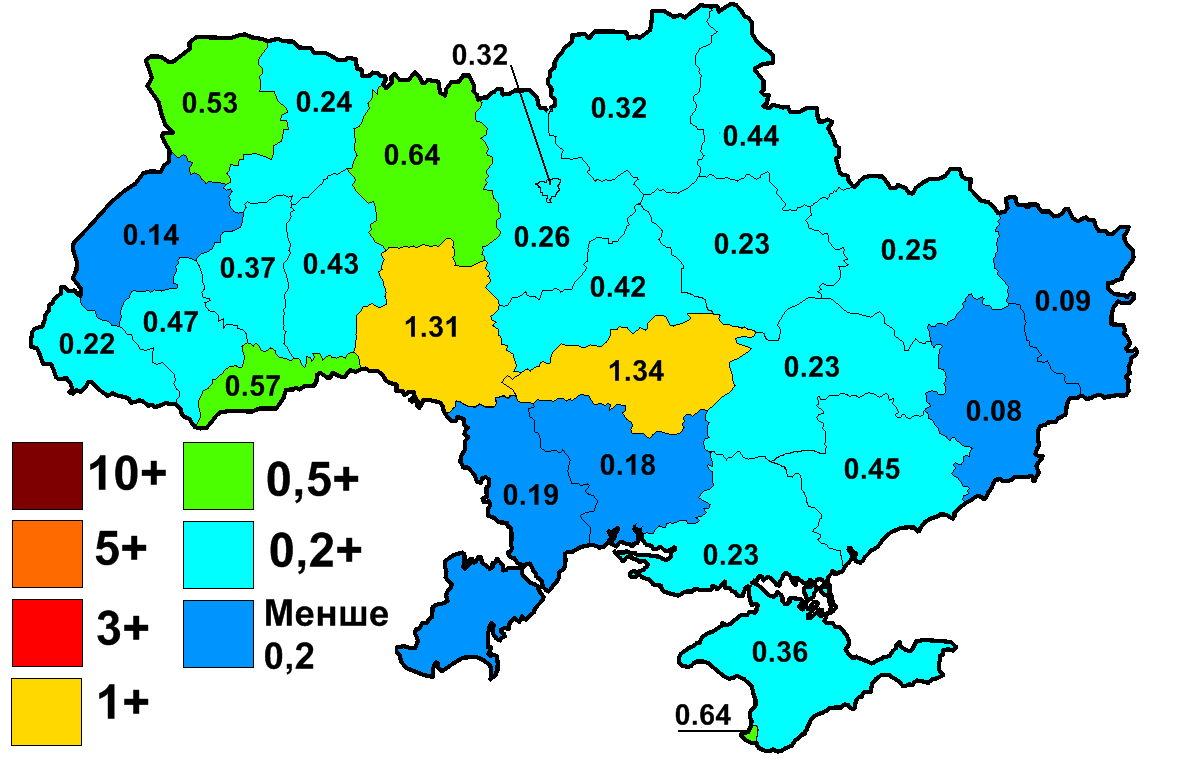

The Election Bloc Liudmyla Suprun – Ukrainian Regional Asset, (Ukrainian: Виборчий блок Людмили Супрун – Український регіональний актив (УРА)), sometimes translated as Ukrainian Regional Activists was a political alliance in Ukraine led by Liudmyla Suprun.

The bloc had been organized in August 2007 for participation in the 2007 parliamentary election. At the 2007 parliamentary elections it party failed to enter the parliament.

The Bloc consisted of:

- Popular Democratic Party
- Democratic Party of Ukraine
- Republican Christian Party
