= Anatoliy Matviyenko =

Ukrainian politician (1953–2020)

- Анатолій Матвієнко
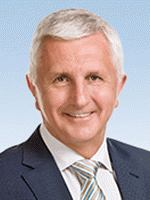
- Matviyenko in 2014

People's Deputy of Ukraine
- In office 27 November 2014 – 29 August 2019
- Constituency: Petro Poroshenko Bloc, No. 32
- In office 25 May 2006 – 12 December 2012
- Constituency: Our Ukraine Bloc, No. 12 (2006–2007); Our Ukraine Bloc, No. 22 (2007–2012)
- In office 12 May 1998 – 19 May 2005
- Constituency: People's Democratic Party, No. 2 (1998–2002); Yulia Tymoshenko Bloc, No. 2 (2002–2005)
- In office 15 May 1990 – 15 May 1994
- Preceded by: Position established
- Constituency: Vinnytsia Oblast, Bershad

Prime Minister of Crimea
- In office 20 April 2005 – 21 September 2005
- Preceded by: Serhiy Kunitsyn
- Succeeded by: Anatoliy Burdiuhov

Governor of Vinnytsia Oblast
- In office 18 June 1996 – 12 May 1998
- Preceded by: Mykola Melnyk
- Succeeded by: Mykola Chumak

Personal details
- Born: 22 March 1953 Bershad, Ukrainian SSR, Soviet Union
- Died: 22 May 2020 (aged 67) Kyiv, Ukraine
- Party: Petro Poroshehnko Bloc (until 2019)
- Other political affiliations: Communist Party of the Soviet Union (1977–1991); People's Democratic Party (1996–1999); Republican Platform (1999–2014); Yulia Tymoshenko Bloc (2005–2006); Our Ukraine Bloc (2006–2012)

Anatoliy Serhiyovych Matviyenko (Ukrainian: Анатолій Сергійович Матвієнко, 22 March 1953 – 22 May 2020) was a Ukrainian politician who was a People's Deputy of Ukraine from 1990 to 2019. During his political career, Matviyenko founded several political parties.

== Early life and career ==
Matviyenko was born on 22 March 1953, in Bershad, Vinnytsia Oblast, to a working-class family. In 1975, he graduated from the Lviv Agrarian Institute, Agrarian Mechanization faculty. Between 1975 and 1977 Matviyenko worked as a mechanic in Bershad. From 1977 he was an activist of Komsomol (LKSMU) and by 1985 became a secretary of the Central Committee of LKSMU. In 1989–91 Matviyenko became the first secretary of the Ukrainian Komsomol and became a member of the Communist Party of Ukraine.

As the first secretary of the Central Committee of LKSMU, in the 1990 Ukrainian Supreme Soviet election Matviyenko was elected to the Supreme Soviet of the Ukrainian Soviet Socialist Republic, representing Bershad. In 1990 he supported the election of Vladimir Ivashko as chairman of the Verkhovna Rada.

Matviyenko was Governor of Vinnytsia Oblast between 1996 and 1998. In February 1996 Matviyenko became a member and leader of the new People's Democratic Party.

Matviyenko returned to the Verkhovna Rada in the 1998 Ukrainian parliamentary election for the People's Democratic Party. He also was the party's faction leader. But Matviyenko left this party after accusing the party of being forced into supporting Leonid Kuchma in the 1999 Ukrainian presidential election. In December 1999 Matviyenko was one of the founders and first leader of the Ukrainian Republican Party "Sobor". In February 2001 he joined the council of the anti-Kuchma National Salvation Committee.

In the 2002 Ukrainian parliamentary election Matviyenko was elected for the Yulia Tymoshenko Bloc, he was placed second on its election list after Yulia Tymoshenko. From 20 April 2005 to 21 September 2005 Matviyenko was Prime Minister of Crimea. In September 2005 he resigned from the post in protest against the fact that his party members did not support the candidacy of Yuriy Yekhanurov for the post of Prime Minister of Ukraine.

Matviyenko briefly worked for the Secretariat of the President of Ukraine (at the time Viktor Yushchenko) early 2006. In the 2006 Ukrainian parliamentary election he was elected again to the Verkhovna Rada for the Our Ukraine Bloc (number 12 on its electoral list). He was reelected in the 2007 Ukrainian parliamentary election for the Our Ukraine–People's Self-Defense Bloc (number 22 on the list).

Matviyenko was registered as an independent candidate in his native Vinnytsia Oblast during the 2012 Ukrainian parliamentary election, but withdrew his candidacy in favour of Hryhoriy Zabolotny of UDAR who gained a seat with 46.73% of the vote.

In the 2014 Ukrainian parliamentary election Matviyenko was again elected to the Verkhovna Rada after placing 32nd on the electoral list of Petro Poroshenko Bloc. In October 2016 it was reported that he had declared ownership of a private church.

Matviyenko died on 22 May 2020, at the age of 67.

Matviyenko was married to Olha, and had two sons Viktor and Pavlo.

Party political offices
Preceded by Valeriy Tsybukh	Leader of LKSMU; 1989–1991	Succeeded by position liquidated
Preceded by position created	Leader of Toiling Congress of Ukraine; 1993–1996	Succeeded by position liquidated
Preceded by position created	Leader of People's Democratic Party; 1996–1999	Succeeded by Valeriy Pustovoitenko
Preceded by position created	Leader of Ukrainian Platform "Sobor"; 1999–2011	Succeeded by Pavlo Zhebrivsky
Political offices
Preceded by Serhiy Kunitsyn	Prime Minister of Crimea; 2005	Succeeded by Anatoliy Burdiuhov
