= Leonid Yemets =

Ukrainian politician

- Леонід Ємець
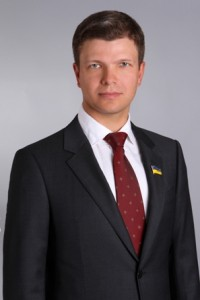

People's Deputy of Ukraine

7th convocation
- In office December 12, 2012 – November 27, 2014

8th convocation
- In office November 27, 2014 – August 29, 2019

Personal details
- Born: 30 August 1979 Kyiv, Ukrainian SSR, Soviet Union
- Party: Independent

Yemets Leonid Oleksandrovych (Ukrainian: Ємець Леонід Олександрович, 30 August 1979) is a Ukrainian lawyer and politician, People's Deputy of Ukraine of the 7th and 8th convocations. Deputy of the City Council of the IX convocation from the European Solidarity.

During the 2004 presidential elections, Leonid Emets was a trustee of the presidential candidate Viktor Yushchenko in 219 by the Policy district, headed the headquarters of Yushchenko in the Pechersky district of Kyiv. He also was the commandant of the part of the Orange Revolution. In 2006, Emets became a deputy of the Pechersk District Council, where he headed the faction of Our Ukraine.

During the 2014 Maidan revolution, he was responsible for the forensic support of the activists of Euromaidan and AutoMaidan.

== Personal life ==
On February 14, 2014, Leonid Yemets married Svitlana Taratorina. The wedding took place on Maidan Nezalezhnosti.
