= Democratic Union (Ukraine) =

Political party in Ukraine

The Democratic Union (Ukrainian: Демократиний союз Demokratyčnyj Sojuz) is a political party in Ukraine registered in June 1999.

At the parliamentary elections on 30 March 2002, the party won together with the Democratic Party of Ukraine 0.87%% of the popular vote and 4 (single-mandate constituency) seats out of 450 seats. The party did not take part in further national elections.

== See also ==
- Liberalism
- Contributions to liberal theory
- Liberalism worldwide
- List of liberal parties
- Liberal democracy
- Liberalism in Ukraine
