= Volodymyr Yavorivsky =

Ukrainian poet, writer, journalist, and politician (1942–2021)

- Володимир Яворівський
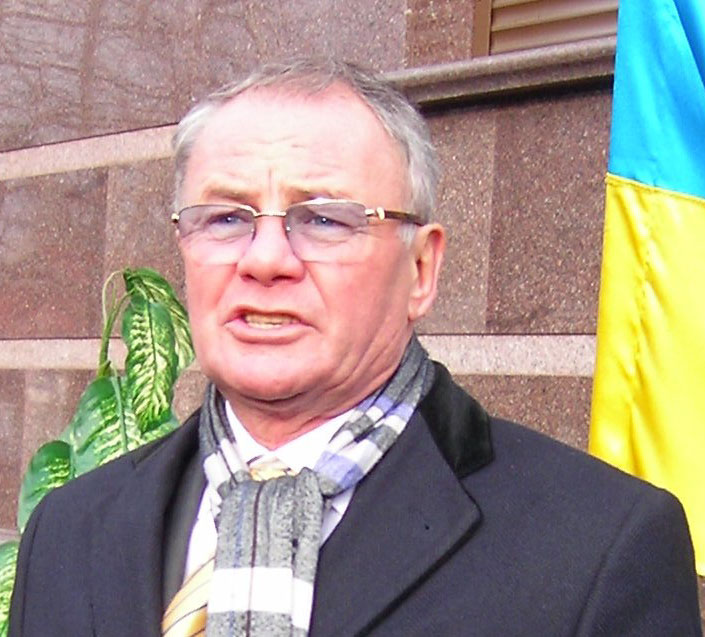
- Yavorivsky in 2012

People's Deputy of Ukraine
- In office 14 May 2002 – 27 November 2014
- Preceded by: Oleksandr Hudyma (2002); Constituency re-established
- Succeeded by: Constituency abolished (2006); Boryslav Bereza (2014)
- Constituency: Lviv Oblast, No. 123 (2002–2006); Yulia Tymoshenko Bloc, No. 22 (2006–2012); Kyiv, No. 213 (2012–2014)
- In office 15 May 1990 – 12 May 1998
- Preceded by: Constituency established Volodymyr Borysovsky (Soviet)
- Succeeded by: Constituency abolished
- Constituency: Kirovohrad Oblast, Svitlovodsk

Personal details
- Born: 11 October 1942 Teklivka, Transnistria Governorate, Romania (now Ukraine)
- Died: 17 April 2021 (aged 78)
- Party: Batkivshchyna
- Other political affiliations: People's Movement of Ukraine; Democratic Party of Ukraine; Reforms and Order Party; Our Ukraine
- Spouse: Halyna Oleksandrivna (1946, actress)
- Children: Son Svyatoslav (1964, journalist), daughter Olesya (1978)
- Education: Odesa State University
- Occupation: Politician
- Profession: Poet, writer, journalist
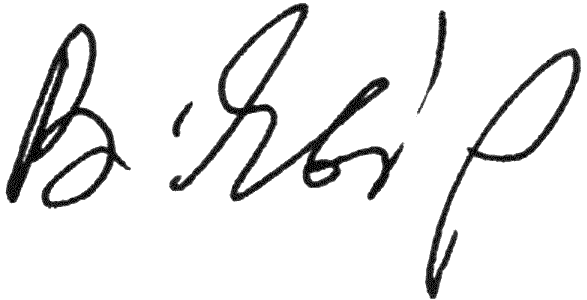
- Signature

Volodymyr Oleksandrovych Yavorivsky (Ukrainian: Володимир Олександрович Яворівський; 11 October 1942 – 17 April 2021) was a Ukrainian poet, writer, journalist and politician who served as a People's Deputy of Ukraine twice, first from 1990 to 1998 and later from 2002 to 2012. A co-founder of the People's Movement of Ukraine before joining the Yulia Tymoshenko Bloc.

== Biography ==
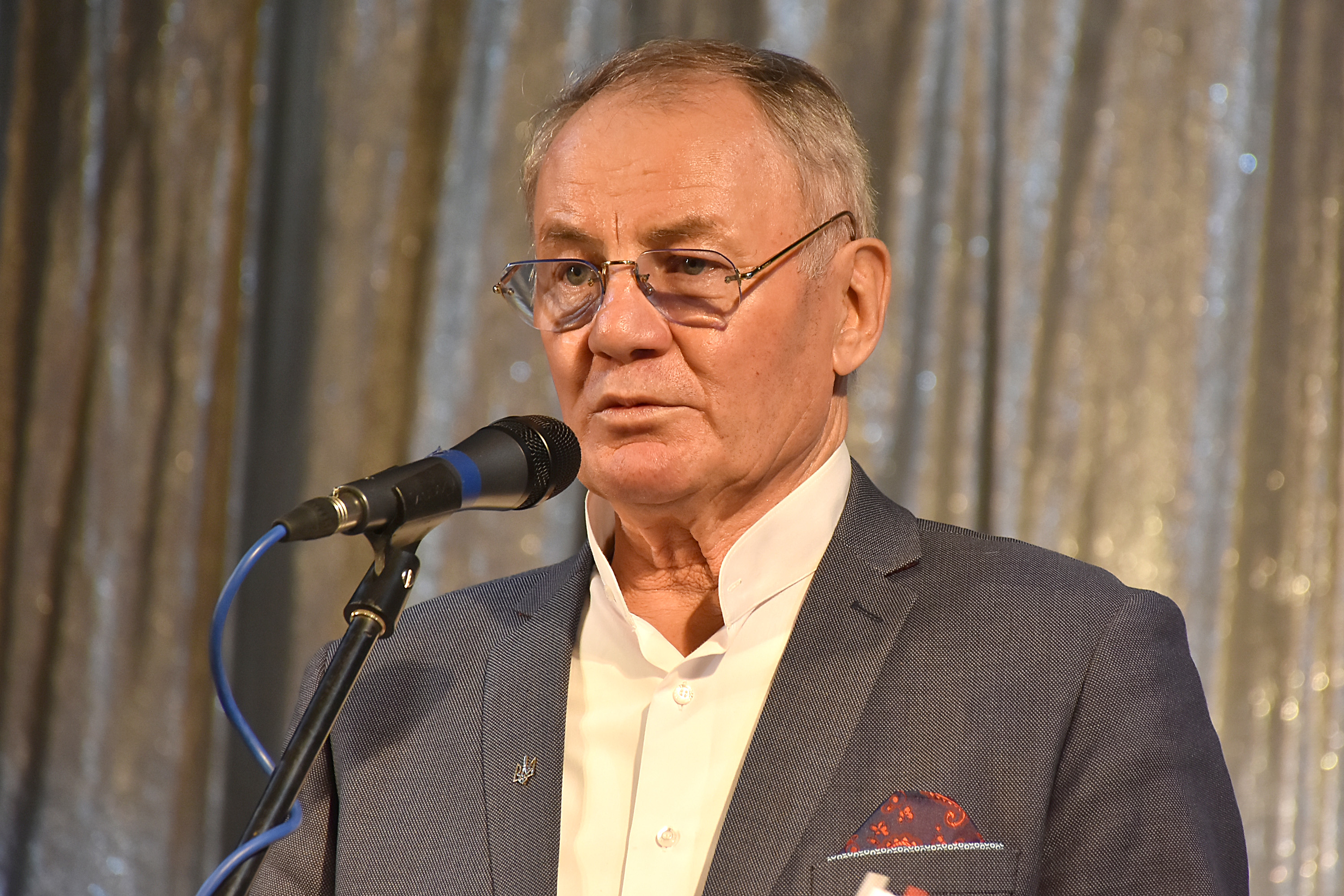
Yavorivsky in 2019

Born in 1942 in the Crijopol region of Jugastru County (today part of Vinnytsia Oblast), Yavorivsky graduated from the Odesa State University as a specialist on "Ukrainian language and literature". He worked as an editor on the local radio, as a newspaper reporter ("Zaporizka pravda", "Literaturna Ukraina", "Prapor Yunosti"), a scriptwriter on Lviv television, a literary consultant, a referent of the Writer's Union of Ukraine and as the department chief and deputy editor to Vitchizna Magazine.

In the late 1980s, Yavorivsky began his active political career. He was a people's deputy of the last Supreme Soviet of the USSR in 1989–1991 and became one of the founders of People's Movement of Ukraine.

Volodymyr Yavorivsky took active part in defending the rights of the Chernobyl disaster victims.

In the 4th Verkhovna Rada of Ukraine (2002–2006), Volodymyr Yavorivsky belonged to the Our Ukraine fraction and in the 5th and 6th Rada convocation to the Yulia Tymoshenko Bloc fraction. In the 2012 parliamentary election he was (re)-elected into the Verkhovna Rada by winning a constituency in Kyiv for Batkivschyna.

Yavorivsky combined parliamentary functions with the position of the Writer's Union of Ukraine Chairman (appointed October 2001).

In the 2014 parliamentary election Yavorivsky again tried to win a constituency seat in Kyiv for Batkivschyna, but failed this time having finished fourth in his constituency with 13.72% of votes. The winner of the constituency, Boryslav Bereza, gained 29.44% of the votes.

He died on 17 April 2021, aged 78.

== Published works ==
=== Short story collections ===
- A yabluka padayut (The apples are falling), 1968
- Гроно стиглого винограду (A cluster of mature grapes), 1971

=== Sketch collections ===
- Kryla vygostreni nebom (Wings sharpened by heaven), 1975
- Tut na zemli (Here on the ground), 1977
- I v mori pamyatayu dzherelo (Remembering the source even at the sea), 1980
- Pravo vlasnogo imeni (The right of the own name), 1985
- Shcho my za narod takyi? (What a people are we?), 2002

=== Stories ===
- Z vysoty veresnya (From the height of September), 1984
- Vichni Kortelisy, 1984

=== Novels ===
- Lantsiugova reakciya (Chain reaction), 1978 about Chornobyl
- Oglyansya z oseni, 1979
- Avtoportret z uyavy (Biography of Catherine Bilokur), 1980
- Maria z polynom u kintsi stolittya, 1988, about the Chornobyl disaster
- Kryza (Crisis), 2000

Cultural offices
Preceded by Oles Honchar	Shevchenko National Prize Committee Chair; 1996 – 1999	Succeeded by Ivan Dziuba
