= Donetsk National University of Economics and Trade named after M. Tugan-Baranovsky =

Ukrainian high education institution

Donetsk National University of Economics and Trade named after Mykhailo Tuhan-Baranovskyi
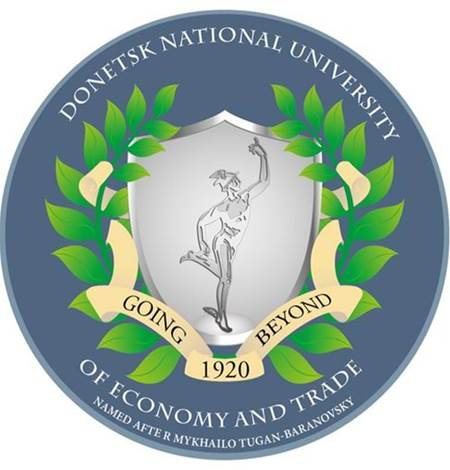
- Other names: DonNUET
- Established: 1920 (as the Ukrainian Cooperative Institute)
- Affiliations: Ministry of Education and Science of Ukraine
- Rector: Oksana Chernega
- Location: 16, Tramvaina Str., Kryvyi Rih, 50005, Ukraine; 47°52′49″N 33°21′38″E
- Website: donnuet.edu.ua
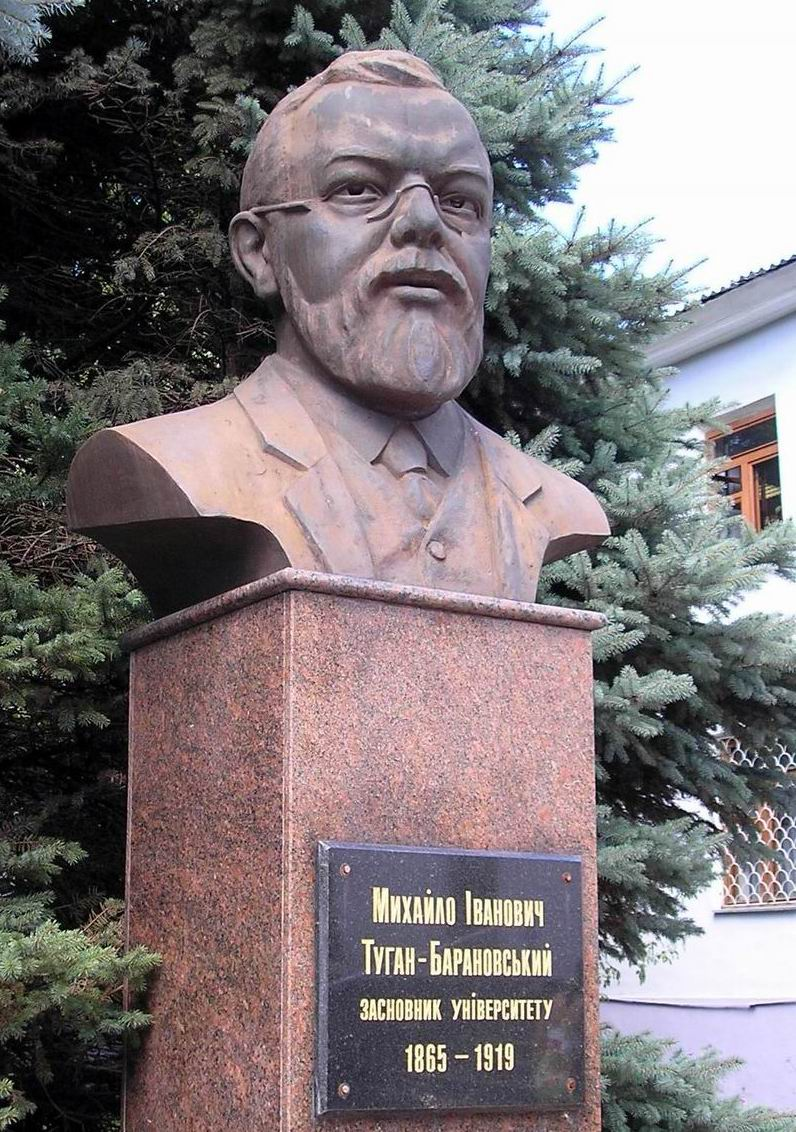

University rankings

Regional – Overall
- QS Emerging Europe and Central Asia: 401-450 (2022)

The Donetsk National University of Economics and Trade (named after Mykhailo Tuhan-Baranovskyi, abbr. DonNUET) is a Ukrainian state-sponsored university.

DonNUET is one of the oldest higher education institutions in Ukraine, the successor of the Kyiv Cooperative Institute and the Kharkiv Institute of Soviet Trade.

== History ==
In 1920, under the initiative of Mykhailo Tuhan-Baranovskyi, the Ukrainian Cooperative Institute was established. On November 16 of the same year the institute became the cooperative faculty of the Kyiv Institute of National Economy. In 1922, it became the Kyiv Cooperative Technical School and the Cooperative Institute. Chubar.

In 1933–1934 the school merged with the Kharkov Planned Institute of Consumer Cooperatives and moved to Kharkov. In 1940 it joined with several Kharkov universities to form the Kharkov Institute of Soviet Trade. In 1959 the Kharkov Institute of Soviet Trade moved to the city of Stalino and became the Stalin Institute of Soviet Trade. In 1961, that name was changed to the Donetsk Institute of Soviet Trade.

Starting in the 1960s, the Institute opened branches and subsidiaries in several regions of the Ukrainian SSR (including Kyiv, Odesa and other large cities). In 1992 the university became known as Donetsk State Commercial Institute, and in 1998 as the Donetsk State University of Economics and Trade. In 2007 DonNUET received the status of a national university.

On September 17, 2010, DonNUET signed the Great Charter of Universities in Bologna (Italy), which provides members the mutual exchange of information and documentation and an increase in the number of joint projects. University trains specialists for trade and services and for other areas of the economy. The university is being reconstructed provide young qualified specialists.

In 2014, DonNUET moved its operations from Donetsk to Krivyi Rih to avoid the disruption caused by the Russo-Ukrainian War.

== Recognition ==
- In 1970 DonNUET was awarded the Diploma of the Presidium of the Supreme Soviet of the Ukrainian SSR.
- The staff of DonNUET was awarded: the International Personnel Academy - the Order of Honor (2002), the International Academic popularity rating "Golden Fortune" - Silver Stela and the Quality Certificate (2003), and the Order "Saint Dmitry Solunsky ".
- DonNUET was awarded the International Sign "Gold Medal of Socrates" for significant scientific research and dissemination (London, UK, 2012).
- In 2005, the DonNUET passed international certification in the International Educational Society (IES) (London) and received a rating of A, "First class institution with international experience". This made it possible to issue, an IES International Certificate in all specialties.
- DonNUET is a member in international educational associations, including the European Association of Universities (since March 2008), the Association of Economic Universities of Southeast Europe and the Black Sea Region (since April 2008).
