= Democratic Party of Ukraine =

Political party in Ukraine

Democratic Party of Ukraine Демократична партія України
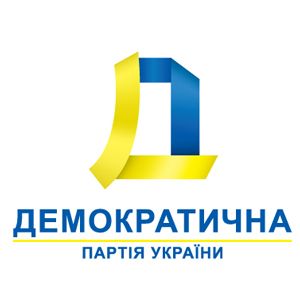
- Leader: Svitlana Kostyuk
- Founders: Yuriy Badzyo; Ivan Drach; Dmytro Pavlychko; Volodymyr Yavorivsky
- Founded: 16 December 1990; 35 years ago
- Split from: People's Movement of Ukraine
- Headquarters: Kyiv, Ukraine
- Ideology: Social democracy National Democracy
- Political position: Centre-left
- Verkhovna Rada: 0 / 450
- Kyiv City Council: 0 / 120

The Democratic Party of Ukraine (Ukrainian: Демократична партія України; Demokratychna Partiya Ukrayiny) is a political party in Ukraine registered in 1991. Until 2006 it had a parliamentary representation, but after associating itself with the People's Democratic Party, the Democratic Party disappeared from political arena.

The party did not participate in either the 2012 nor the 2014 parliamentary elections.

== History ==
The party's roots can be found in People's Movement of Ukraine (Rukh), the Ukrainian national democratic movement, and 1960s dissident movement (shistdesyatnyky). While the party's inaugural congress would only be held on 16 December 1990, the party's draft manifesto was first published in the newspaper Literaturna Ukraïna on 31 May 1990, and its creation announced by party leaders in Terebovlia on 22 September 1990. They included figures such as Ivan Drach, Dmytro Pavlychko, Volodymyr Yavorivsky, and Vitalii Donchyk.

The party's draft manifesto, based on Yuriy Badzyo's 1989 programme for a "Ukrainian Party of Democratic Socialism and State Independence", called for the establishment of an independent Ukraine, affirmed the party as a member of the social democratic movement, and opposed the formation of a new union between the republics of the Soviet Union.

However, the party's long delay before holding its first congress meant many initial supporters abandoned it for other projects or remained independent, while the right-wing Ukrainian Republican Party (URP) had already established itself as the premier Ukrainian nationalist party.

The programme eventually adopted by the party at its congress committed it to liberal and humanist values and adopted a civic nationalist conception of a future Ukrainian state. Economically, it called for the gradual reduction of state intervention into the economy and a "guarantee of the social defense of the population". During this time, the rehabilitation of the Organisation of Ukrainian Nationalists and Ukrainian Insurgent Army (OUN-UPA) among national democratic circles became a point of contention, especially for the party's eastern members, even as Pavlychko declared that the party would oppose both the "dictatorship of Bolshevism" and the integral nationalism of Dmytro Dontsov.

Upon its founding the party had a faction of 23 deputies in the Supreme Soviet of the Ukrainian SSR led by Dymytro Pavlychko, and claimed another 19 "sympathisers". Yuriy Badzyo was elected the party's leader.

The party initially chose people's deputy and economist Volodymyr Pylypchuk as its candidate in the 1991 Ukrainian presidential election but failed to collect enough signatures for his candidacy. Instead, the party opted to support ex-Communist Leonid Kravchuk despite the presence of other national democratic candidates such as Rukh's Viacheslav Chornovil.

Between 1991 and 1992 the party gradually shifted closer toward the Ukrainian Republican Party and adopted a more radically nationalist line. The party's newspaper began to devote many of its pages to positive portrayals of the OUN-UPA and blaming its poor historical image in eastern Ukraine on Soviet propaganda, and the draft programme for its second congress referred to Ukraine as the ethnic territory of Ukrainians. It was also the first party to call for the Supreme Soviet to declare Ukrainian independence on the day of the 1991 Soviet coup attempt.

Badzyo stood down as chairman at the party's second congress in December 1992. Volodomyr Yavorivsky was elected as his replacement.

In the 1994 parliamentary election, the party won 2 seats. In the 1998 elections, the party was part of the Electoral bloc NEP with the Party of Economic Revival, the combination won 1,22% of the national vote; the party gained 1 (single-mandate constituency) seat. In a union with the Democratic Union the party gained 4 constituency seats during the 2002 Ukrainian parliamentary election.

In the 2006 elections, the party took part in the alliance Block of People's Democratic Parties but this alliance did not overcome the 3% threshold (winning only 0.49% of the votes) and therefore no seats. In the 30 September 2007 elections, the party failed as part of the Ukrainian Regional Asset to win parliamentary representation.

The merger of United Centre with the Democratic Party of Ukraine failed to materialize prior to the first ever congress of United Centre.

In July 2011 the chairman of the Democratic Party of Ukraine Sergey Kozachenko was sentenced to eight years in prison Kyiv District Court of Simferopol on charges of embezzling ₴65 million in credit union's "Southern".

In November 2011 the party formed a faction in the Kyiv City Council of 7 deputies, this while in the previous 2008 Kyiv City Council election the party had not won any seats.

In the 2014 Kyiv City Council election, the party won 2 seats. But in the 2015 Kyiv local election it lost these seats (it scored less than 2% of the vote).

The party did not participate in the 2014 Ukrainian parliamentary election.

== Electoral results ==
Parliamentary representation
Year	Votes	%	Mandates	Notes
1994	312,842	1.20	2	Participated independently
1998	326,489	1.22	1	as part "Block of Democratic Parties"
2002	227,393	0.87	4	as part of Democratic Party - Democratic Union
2006	126,586	0.49	0	as part of People's Democratic Parties
2007	80,944	0.34	0	as part of Ukrainian Regional Asset
2012	did not participate			
2014	did not participate			
