= People's Democratic Union "New Ukraine" =

People's Democratic Union "New Ukraine" is a political union of Ukraine that was officially established in 1992.

The idea on creation of the union came from the initiative of the Party of Democratic Revival of Ukraine when it gathered on January 8, 1992. The union was intended to be a collective organization and initially consisted of 12 members: Party of Democratic Revival of Ukraine, United Social Democratic Party, Kiev branch of the Party of Greens of Ukraine, Society of lawyers of Ukraine, Society of cooperators and entrepreneurs of Ukraine, Ukrainian league of companies with foreign capital, Kiev branch of the Cooperation workers Trade Union, Ukrainian association of quality administration specialists, Ukrainian Student Society (USS), Union "Chornobyl of Ukraine", Agro-industrial concern of farmers "Ukraine", and Ukrainian confederation of entrepreneurs. To join the union, applications were submitted by the Liberal Democratic Party of Ukraine and Constitutional Democratic Party.
