= People's Democratic Party (Ukraine) =

Political party in Ukraine

People's Democratic Party Народно-демократична партія
- Russian name: Народно-демократическая партия
- Leader: Lyudmyla Suprun
- Founder: Anatoliy Matviyenko
- Founded: 24 February 1996
- Registered: 30 May 1996
- Merger of: PDUV; TCU; USRC
- Headquarters: Kyiv
- Newspaper: Ukraine and World Today weekly
- Youth wing: People's Democratic League of youth
- Women wing: Action
- Ecological wing: All-Ukrainian Ecological League
- Membership (2012): 185,000
- Ideology: Social democracy Factions: Pro-Leonid Kuchma; Authoritarianism
- Political position: Centre
- National affiliation: Our Choice – Leonid Kuchma! For United Ukraine; We Know How; Ukrainian Regional Asset
- Colours: Green
- Verkhovna Rada: 0 / 450

Website
- ndp.org.ua (Archived)

The People's Democratic Party (Ukrainian: Народно-демократична партія, romanized: Narodno-demokratychna partiya; abbreviated NDP) is a political party in Ukraine established on 24 February 1996. It was registered with the Ministry of Justice on 30 May 1996. The party is Russophone.

== History ==
The People's Democratic Party was established at its constituent congress in Kyiv. The party was created through a merger of three political parties (The Party of Democratic Revival of Ukraine, the Toiling Congress of Ukraine, and the Union of Support for Republic of Crimea), two public organizations (The Union of Students of Ukraine and the New Wave) and two political clubs (New Ukraine and the Association of Young Ukrainian Politicians and Political Scientists). Anatoliy Matviyenko was elected party chairman.

At the 1998 Ukrainian parliamentary election, the party gained 5% of the votes and 28 seats in the Verkhovna Rada. At the time of the election, the party's key member, Valeriy Pustovoitenko, was Prime Minister of Ukraine. Pustovoitenko became the party's leader in May 1999 until April 2006. In September 2001, the Interregional Bloc of Reforms (MBR) was merged into the party.

At the parliamentary elections in 2002, the party was part of the For United Ukraine alliance, the alliance won 11.77% of the popular vote and a total of 102 out of 450 seats in the Verkhovna Rada.

At the 2006 Ukrainian parliamentary election, the NDP took part in the alliance Block of People's Democratic Parties, but this alliance did not overcome the 3% threshold (winning only 0.49% of the votes), and therefore taking no seats. After taking responsibility for the defeat Valeriy Pustovoitenko resigned as leader of the party. In his place the party was led by Lyudmyla Suprun.

In the 2007 elections, the party failed again as part of the Ukrainian Regional Asset to win parliamentary representation. The current chairman of the NDP is still Lyudmyla Suprun.

In the 2012 Ukrainian parliamentary election the party competed in/for 9 constituencies (seats); but it won in none and thus missed parliamentary representation.

The party did not participate in the 2014 Ukrainian parliamentary election.

== Election results ==
Verkhovna Rada of Ukraine
Year	Popular vote	% of popular vote	Overall seats won	Seat change	Government
1998	1,331,460	5.2%	28 / 450	▲28	coalition government
2002	For United Ukraine bloc		17 / 450	▼11	coalition government
2006	Block of People's Democratic Parties		0 / 450	▼17	N/A
2007	Suprun bloc - URA		0 / 450	Steady	N/A
2012	partial participation		0 / 450	Steady	N/A

== Party's Values ==
Person - Family - Prosperity - Ukraine

== Associated organizations ==
- Association of Deputies "Trust"
- Cultural center "Ukraine Spiritual"

== Chairpersons ==
- 1996 - 1999 Anatoliy Matviyenko
- 1999 - 2006 Valeriy Pustovoitenko
- 2006–present Lyudmyla Suprun
