= Kravchuchka =

Ukrainian colloquial term for a hand truck

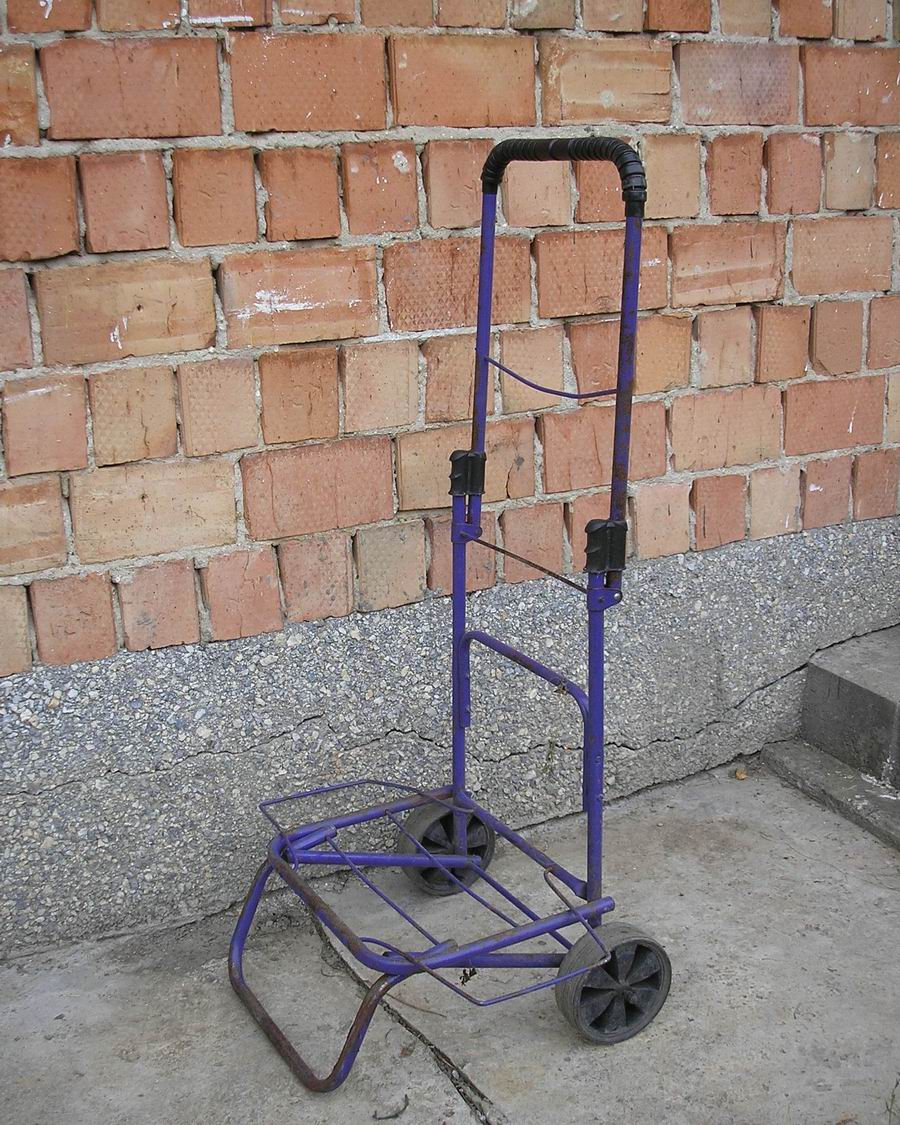
A kravchuchka

A kravchuchka (Ukrainian: кравчучка), also called a kuchmovoz (кучмовоз), is a Ukrainian colloquial term for a model of hand truck originally produced by the Antonov Serial Production Plant. It was named after President Leonid Kravchuk, during whose 1991–1994 presidency hand trucks were ubiquitous as a result of hyperinflation. Since the 1990s, the kravchuchka has become a symbol of the decade and urban poverty in Ukraine.

== Background and production ==
The model of hand truck that would eventually become known as a kravchuchka was developed in 1983 by Oleksii Serheiev, an engineer at the Antonov Serial Production Plant. Serheiev, who had designed several products produced by the plant (including a washing machine, a stroller and a trailer), injured his spine while building a house for his family. As a result of his injuries, he was forbidden from lifting objects heavier than 5 kilograms (11 lb) by a neurosurgeon.

Undeterred, Serheiev designed a hand truck alongside his neighbour, a welder. Serheiev's design of a hand truck was unique at the time in that its bed was wide enough to be used as a seat; in that it could be folded to a size small enough to fit in a plastic bag; and that it could carry over 100 kilograms (220 lb). According to Serheiev's son, it was designed so that it could be assembled or disassembled within 15 seconds and placed in a bag. The hand truck was initially seen as a curiosity, and Antonov initially saw no reason to produce it, preventing Serheiev from filing a patent. It entered production in 1991, under the name of Dzhmil (Ukrainian: Джміль, lit. 'bumblebee') with Antonov intending to produce one million units per year; however, the Dzhmil proved so popular that supply could not keep up with demand. As a result, many Ukrainians produced their own derivatives of the Dzhmil.

== Popularisation ==
Following the 1989–1991 Ukrainian revolution and the dissolution of the Soviet Union, Ukraine experienced significant hyperinflation. Ukrainians often travelled to Poland and Turkey as shuttle traders due to the low value of the karbovanets, or sold produce from collective farms, using the Dzhmil and its derivatives. The name kravchuchka came from Leonid Kravchuk, President of Ukraine during the hyperinflationary period. A popular urban legend in Ukraine claims that Kravchuk himself invented the kravchuchka. Kravchuk embraced the term, arguing that kravchuchka had enabled people to leave poverty and survive during the hyperinflationary period.

Following the 1994 Ukrainian presidential election, in which Kravchuk was replaced by Leonid Kuchma, the colloquialism kuchmovoz briefly emerged, but, due to the end of hyperinflation, it failed to replace kravchuchka. The term kuchmovoz is also sometimes used to refer to an updated version of the kravchuchka.

== As a symbol ==
The kravchuchka has, over time, become a symbol of Ukraine in the 1990s, as well as economic woes that followed the Soviet Union's dissolution. A 2013 art installation in Kyiv, titled Grandmother with Kravchuchka (Russian: Бабка с кравчучкой, romanized: Babka s kravchuchkoy), prominently included a kravchuchka.

The kravchuchka has also been used as a symbol of urban poverty, particularly as part of protests against Leonid Kuchma. In a 2004 International Workers' Day demonstration, members of the Communist Party of Ukraine and Socialist Party of Ukraine, led by Yuriy Lutsenko, erected a large kravchuchka on Bankova Street to condemn Kuchma's economic policies.
