= Leonid Kravchuk =

President of Ukraine from 1991 to 1994

Hero of Ukraine Leonid Kravchuk
- Леонід Кравчук
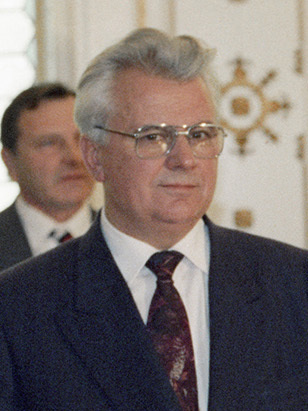
- Kravchuk in 1991

1st President of Ukraine
- In office 5 December 1991 – 19 July 1994^{[A]}
- Prime Minister: Vitold Fokin; Leonid Kuchma; Vitaliy Masol
- Preceded by: Position established (Note: In August 1992 Mykola Plaviuk, president of the Ukrainian People's Republic in exile, formally transferred his powers to Kravchuk, de-jure recognizing the first president of independent Ukraine as his legal successor.)
- Succeeded by: Leonid Kuchma
Parliamentary positions
1st Chairman of the Verkhovna Rada^{[B]}
In office 23 July 1990 – 5 December 1991
President	Himself (acting, from 1991)
Preceded by	Vladimir Ivashko; Ivan Plyushch (acting)
Succeeded by	Ivan Plyushch
People's Deputy of Ukraine
In office 31 March 2002 – 25 May 2006
Constituency	SDPU(o), No. 5^{[C]}
In office 29 March 1998 – 31 March 2002
Constituency	SDPU(o), No. 1^{[C]}
In office 25 September 1994 – 29 March 1998
Preceded by	Lev Krupa
Succeeded by	Constituency abolished
Constituency	Ternopil Oblast, Terebovlia
In office 15 May 1990 – 5 December 1991
Preceded by	Position established
Succeeded by	Kostiantyn Piskunovskyi
Constituency	Vinnytsia Oblast, Yampil

Personal details
- Born: 10 January 1934 Żytyń Wielki, Poland (now Velykyi Zhytyn, Ukraine)
- Died: 10 May 2022 (aged 88) Munich, Bavaria, Germany
- Resting place: Baikove Cemetery, Kyiv
- Party: Communist Party of the Soviet Union (1958–1991); Independent (1991–1994, 2009–2022); Social Democratic Party of Ukraine (united) (1998–2009); Ne Tak (2006)
- Spouse: Antonina Mishura (m. 1957)
- Children: 1
- Education: Kyiv State University (1958); Academy of Social Sciences of the CPSU (1970)
- Awards: Full list
- Leonid Kravchuk's voice Kravchuk during a press conference with U.S. president Bill Clinton; Recorded 12 January 1994
- Central institution membership: 1970–1991: Member, Central Committee of the Communist Party of Ukraine; 1989–1991: Candidate member, Politburo of the Communist Party of Ukraine; 1990–1991: Second Secretary, Politburo of the Communist Party of Ukraine
- A. Acting: 24 August – 5 December 1991. B. Supreme Soviet until 24 August 1991. C. Party-list proportional representation seat.

Leonid Makarovych Kravchuk (Ukrainian: Леонід Макарович Кравчук, IPA: [leoˈn⁽ʲ⁾id mɐˈkɑrowɪtʃ krɐu̯ˈtʃuk]; 10 January 1934 – 10 May 2022) was a Ukrainian politician who served as the first president of Ukraine from 5 December 1991 to 19 July 1994. Kravchuk's presidency was marked by Ukraine achieving independence from the Soviet Union, the handover of its post-Soviet nuclear arsenal and an economic crisis that ultimately resulted in him losing re-election. Prior to his presidency, he was Chairman of the Verkhovna Rada. After leaving office, he served as a People's Deputy of Ukraine for the Social Democratic Party of Ukraine (united).

Born to a family of peasants in Volhynia, Kravchuk's early life was significantly impacted by World War II and the postwar nationalist insurgency. He joined the Communist Party of Ukraine in 1958 and rose through the ranks, working as a propagandist. He became Chairman of the Supreme Soviet of the Ukrainian SSR in 1990, amidst the 1989–1991 Ukrainian revolution and the dissolution of the Soviet Union. He opposed the 1991 Soviet coup attempt and subsequently led Ukraine to become independent from the Soviet Union.

Kravchuk became Ukraine's first democratically elected president in 1991. As president, Kravchuk formed an informal alliance between his national communists and national democrats, an ideological group succeeding Ukraine's Soviet dissidents. He sought to build a centralised state, opposing federalism, and established an independent Armed Forces of Ukraine, additionally giving up Ukraine's nuclear arsenal. He supported the possibility of Ukrainian membership in the NATO military alliance. Kravchuk's presidency saw the enrichment of the former nomenklatura and a failure to undertake economic reforms, caused by uncertainty over the correct measures to take. Ukraine's gross domestic product contracted by 40% during his time in office. In the wake of strikes by coal miners, Kravchuk called snap elections for Ukraine's parliament and presidency; he was defeated both times in 1994, being succeeded as president by Leonid Kuchma.

After his presidency, Kravchuk remained active in Ukrainian politics, serving as a People's Deputy of Ukraine from 1994 to 2006. He joined the Social Democratic Party of Ukraine (united) in 1998 alongside other national communists, and supported Viktor Yanukovych in the 2004 Ukrainian presidential election and subsequent Orange Revolution. During the 2006 Ukrainian parliamentary election, he led the far-left, pro-Russian Ne Tak alliance, which failed to enter the Verkhovna Rada. Kravchuk later endorsed Yulia Tymoshenko for president and criticised Yanukovych as anti-democratic. From 2020 to 2022, he was Ukraine's representative to the Trilateral Contact Group, which sought to negotiate an end to the war in Donbas. During that time, both Kravchuk and his adviser, former Prime Minister Vitold Fokin, made controversial comments claiming Russia was uninvolved in the war.

== Early life ==
Leonid Makarovych Kravchuk was born on 10 January 1934 in the village of Velykyi Zhytyn (Polish: Żytyń Wielki) to an ethnic Ukrainian peasant family. At that time the village was part of the Second Polish Republic. It was annexed into the Ukrainian Soviet Socialist Republic after the Soviet invasion of Poland in 1939, when Kravchuk was a child. Kravchuk's father was connected to the Ukrainian nationalist underground, which resisted Polish rule over western Ukraine.

Kravchuk's family belonged to the Eastern Orthodox Mykhailivska Church in Velykyi Zhytyn, and he later recounted that his family was deeply religious. Kravchuk's birth and baptismal records, recorded by the church, have since been lost; local newspaper Volyn speculated in 2018 that it may have been removed or destroyed at Kravchuk's behest in order to improve his image in Soviet circles as an atheist. As a child, Kravchuk shared his family's religious beliefs, and the first recorded mention of his name was around the Christmas of 1942, when an article by Ulas Samchuk in Nazi collaborator newspaper Volyn noted him among local children singing koliadky and donating 40 karbovantsiv to the Ukrainian Red Cross Society. Kravchuk later recalled that he became an atheist in his childhood, a fact he said his mother sought to change by seating him under icons to pray. Kravchuk's parents worked under Polish landowners and his father served in the Polish Army before being killed in World War II.

Kravchuk's childhood was significantly affected by World War II, especially the activities of the nationalist Ukrainian Insurgent Army (Ukrainian: Українська повстанська армія, romanised: Ukrainska povstanska armiia; UPA), which was active between 1943 and the late 1940s in western Ukraine. The UPA was particularly concentrated in Kravchuk's native Volhynia. American historian and political scientist Alexander J. Motyl wrote in 1995 that "Unlike someone from the Sovietized parts of the country, Kravchuk was well aware of the armed struggle led by the Organization of Ukrainian Nationalists and the Ukrainian Insurgent Army and of the 'insurgent republics' that served as pockets of sovereignty in the forests of Volhynia[.]" Motyl noted that the presence of nationalist mass movements in western Ukraine, including the OUN and the nationalist-influenced Communist Party of Western Ukraine, likely influenced Kravchuk's outlook towards communism and nationalism in a way that most other Soviet politicians did not experience. Motyl also posits that Kravchuk's childhood experience living under German occupation was likely traumatic, and Kravchuk later recounted that at the age of eight, he had watched Jews being executed with a machine gun. According to Russian independent newspaper Novaya Gazeta, some newspapers since perestroika have claimed that Kravchuk secretly brought food to members of the UPA as a child.

Kravchuk married a mathematics teacher, Antonina Mykhailivna Mishura, in 1957. First Lady of the United States from 1989 to 1993, Barbara Bush (wife of 41st American president George H. W. Bush), described Antonina in her memoirs: "She was the nicest young woman, a math teacher with absolutely no interest in politics". The two had one son. Kravchuk studied accounting at a vocational school in Rivne between 1950 and 1953 before attending Taras Shevchenko Kyiv State University. Kravchuk graduated in 1958 at the age of 24, specialising in Marxist political economy, and began working as a teacher of political economy in the southwestern city of Chernivtsi before entering politics. He took part in the International Visitor Leadership Program, a professional exchange run by the US State Department, and later graduated from the Academy of Social Sciences of the CPSU in 1970.

== Communist Party career ==
Kravchuk joined the Communist Party of Ukraine in 1958 and became a member of the party apparatus in Chernivtsi Oblast in 1960. He later became a member of the Kyiv-based Central Committee of the CPU in 1970. Kravchuk became head of the Department of Agitation and Propaganda in 1980, focusing on agitprop, and a candidate member of the CPU politburo in September 1989. He was finally promoted to second secretary of the CPU on 23 June 1990.

Kravchuk's activities as a member of the Communist Party were, from the outset, primarily involved in the spread of ideological propaganda, particularly what the party referred to as "Ukrainian bourgeois nationalism". He celebrated the establishment of what he referred to as "political discotheques" in 1984 and advocated for greater amounts of books, films and works of theatre which negatively depicted imperialism and capitalism, in what Motyl described as an "unabashedly Brezhnevite" taste in media. In 1982, he advised the Central Committee to fight the Catholic Church's ostpolitik by destroying symbols associated with the banned Ukrainian Greek Catholic Church, arresting its adherents and investigating churches, cemeteries and sermons for elements perceived as pro-Catholic.

=== Metamorphosis (1989–1991) ===
As what would become the 1989–1991 Ukrainian revolution was in its early stages, Kravchuk was present at the First Convention of the People's Movement of Ukraine in September 1989. Adrian Karatnycky, a human rights activist who was present at the convention, later remarked on "the anomaly" of Kravchuk's presence at the gathering, given its association with the Soviet dissidents. A month later, following the removal of Volodymyr Shcherbytsky from the position of First Secretary, Kravchuk was appointed to the secretariat within the Central Committee on 18 October 1989 and promoted to a candidate member of the Politburo. He would later be promoted to a full member of the Politburo and Second Secretary of the party in June 1990, followed by membership in the Central Committee of the Communist Party of the Soviet Union in July of the same year.

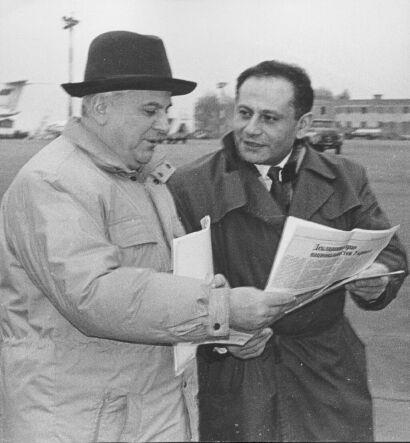
Kravchuk on a visit to Kharkiv during his electoral campaign in 1990

Between 1989 and 1991, Kravchuk underwent a significant ideological shift, in what has been described as a "metamorphosis" by Motyl and journalist Serge Schmemann. During this time, Kravchuk transitioned from a hardline propagandist against Ukrainian nationalism to a supporter of Ukrainian nationalism and one of Ukraine's leading statesmen. Kravchuk later stated that he had become anti-Soviet while studying at the Academy of Social Sciences of the CPSU, when he discovered documents revealing the existence of the Holodomor.

In 1988, Kravchuk began supporting Mikhail Gorbachev and his policies of perestroika. Following Gorbachev's statements, Kravchuk called upon the party to "democratise its own agitation and propaganda" and advocated for communists to "learn democracy", as well as the decentralisation of power to the republics. Throughout 1989 and the summer of 1990, Kravchuk increasingly moved towards national communism, deliberately imitating previous Ukrainian national communists from the interwar period and 1960s. In March 1990, he stood in the Ukrainian Supreme Soviet election for the city of Yampil, Vinnytsia Oblast. He was elected in a landslide, winning 87.38% of the vote and defeating three other candidates in the first round of voting.

As a result of the election, the anti-communist Democratic Bloc captured 111 of 450 seats in the Verkhovna Rada (Supreme Soviet or parliament). 92 Communist People's Deputies left the party in July of the same year to become independents associated with the Democratic Bloc, leaving the weakened Communist majority to call itself the Group of 239. The Democratic Bloc possessed disproportionate influence compared to its number of deputies; of the 190 deputies who were regularly active in committees, over half were from the democratic opposition; only six of the parliamentary presidium's 25 members were conservative members of the CPU; many of the Communist deputies were also directors of state-owned enterprises and therefore unwilling or unable to devote energy to the Verkhovna Rada; and most of the remaining communists were used to treating the Rada as a rubber-stamp and unfamiliar with working under a popularly-elected and powerful parliament.

First Secretary Vladimir Ivashko left Ukraine to take up a position in Moscow in July 1990, a month after being appointed to the position of Chairman of the Verkhovna Rada. Motyl notes the perplexing nature of Ivashko's decision; the People's Movement of Ukraine (Ukrainian: Народний рух України, romanised: Narodnyi rukh Ukrainy; abbreviated Rukh) was gaining strength, Lithuania had declared independence from the Soviet Union and Russia had declared itself sovereign, meaning that Russian laws took precedence over their Soviet equivalents in case of conflict. Ukraine's politicians were left so incensed by Ivashko's perceived abandonment of Ukraine that the CPU voted in favour of the Declaration of State Sovereignty of Ukraine on 16 July.

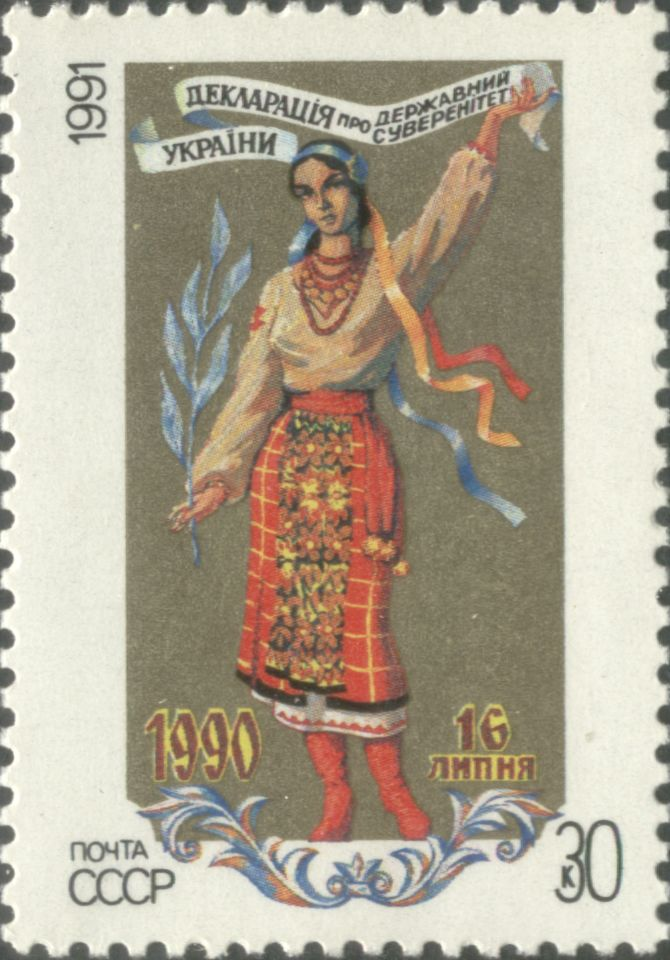
1991 Soviet stamp commemorating the Declaration of State Sovereignty of Ukraine

With Ivashko's absence, both the office of First Secretary and the chairmanship of the Rada were left unfilled, as he had held both roles. Kravchuk was appointed as Chairman of the Rada while conservative Stanislav Hurenko was appointed as First Secretary of the party. This partition between national communism and conservative, "imperial" communism (as termed by researchers Paul D'Anieri, Robert Kravchuk and Taras Kuzio) allowed for members of the CPU to choose which faction they favoured at a time when interest in activism was rising and fear of the state was decreasing. In spite of their differences, by the time Kravchuk and Hurenko were appointed to their positions they both loathed Gorbachev; Hurenko saw him as responsible for the impending collapse of the Soviet system, while Kravchuk viewed him as attempting to maintain the Soviet Union as a singular state. Kravchuk was given increased powers shortly after his appointment, as Gorbachev abolished the leading role of the party in favour of granting formal authority to the Supreme Soviets. This abolition of the leading role of the party further weakened the already-demoralised CPU, allowing for Kravchuk to shepherd through support for the Declaration of State Sovereignty.

By winter 1990–spring 1991, a formidable faction of national communists had emerged, led by Kravchuk. Nonetheless, Kravchuk continued to adjust his ideology as he felt necessary. He did not fully embrace Ukrainian nationalism in this time period and shifted towards conservatism in the winter of 1990–1991, during which the conservative communists were believed to be on the rise prior to the January Events. Eventually, by the spring of 1991, he had coopted the language and iconography of Rukh. At this point, Hurenko complained to the party that he "belonged only nominally to the party", an assessment shared by historian Andrew Wilson.

The 1991 Soviet Union referendum marked the sole success of the conservative communists in Ukraine prior to the dissolution of the Soviet Union. With a turnout of 83%, 70.5% of voters in Ukraine expressed support for the referendum's question to "preserve the USSR as a renewed federation of equal sovereign republics, in which human rights and the freedom of all nationalities will be fully guaranteed?" In the western Ukrainian region of Galicia, however, 88% of voters supported Ukraine's complete independence from the Soviet Union. Kravchuk also inserted the question of whether Ukraine should become "a part of the Union of Sovereign States on the basis of the Declaration of State Sovereignty of Ukraine", which 80.2% of voters voted in favour of. Wilson notes that there was significant confusion over the meaning of the word 'sovereignty', which had been used in Soviet political discourse in reference to Ukraine since 1921, as a majority of people voted for both the preservation of the Soviet Union and Ukrainian sovereignty.

In the months prior to the Soviet Union's dissolution, Kravchuk deliberately contrasted Gorbachev's stated "9+1" formula (including republics willing to remain members of the Soviet Union alongside a governing centre) by calling for a "9+0" solution, in which there would be no centre, or simply "+0", indicating his willingness to support Ukrainian independence from the Soviet Union if necessary. For the most part, between March and August 1991 Kravchuk continued to advocate for sovereignty, which was "the limit of most political imaginations", per Wilson.

==== August coup and embrace of Ukrainian nationalism ====
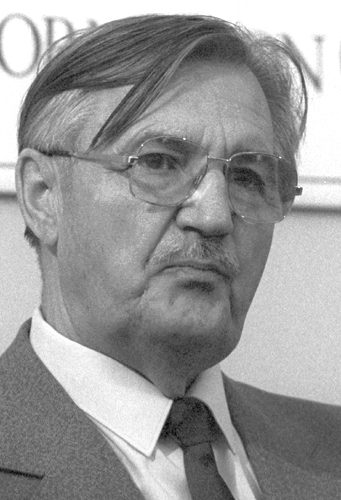
General Valentin Varennikov, leader of the State Committee on the State of Emergency in Kyiv

Conservative communists opposed to Gorbachev's policy attempted a coup d'état on 19 August 1991. Valentin Varennikov, an Army General, was dispatched by the State Committee on the State of Emergency junta to Kyiv as an "emissary", where he began pressuring Kravchuk to throw his lot in with the coup. Kravchuk was awoken at 6:30 on 19 August by General Viktor Chechevatov, commander of the Kyiv Military District, who first informed him of the coup. At 9:00, Kravchuk and Hurenko travelled to the Verkhovna Rada building and met Varennikov, who threatened to respond to any resistance by bringing the state of emergency in Moscow to Ukraine. Kravchuk had refused to meet Varennikov at 11 Bankova Street (the headquarters of the Central Committee), saying that power rested with the Rada and not the Central Committee.

Kravchuk refused to support or condemn the attempted coup while it was ongoing, Varennikov recalled in his memoirs that Kravchuk, while evasive on Varennikov's suggestions to declare a state of emergency in Galicia, was largely cooperative with the putschists. During the attempted takeover, a pro-coup "committee", led by Deputy Prime Minister Kostyantyn Masyk and Ukrainian KGB chief Yevhen Marchuk, formed with the intention of fulfilling the junta's orders. Opposition parties prepared to go underground. Rukh, the Democratic Party and the Republican Party all called for a general strike, with Rukh's call for a strike being published in the Evening Kyiv daily newspaper. The Party of Democratic Revival of Ukraine took a more measured approach, advocating for people to remain calm and not engage in "provocations". Rukh's "people's guard", a group of volunteers that had defended the organisation's demonstrations, began creating plans to seize control of postal, telephone and government buildings, with a blockade on roads, airports and train stations.

Kravchuk first delivered a televised address at 16:00, stressing that he neither condoned nor condemned the coup. That evening, he said on Soviet evening television that "what has happened was bound to happen", a statement that caused significant controversy. Kravchuk later renounced his evening television remarks, claiming that he had been "censored". Ihor Yukhnovskyi, Les Tanyuk, Oleksandr Yemets, Dmytro Pavlychko and Volodymyr Yavorivsky, leading members of the Democratic Bloc, met with Kravchuk from 18:00–20:00. Kravchuk refused their demands to condemn the coup and call an emergency session of the Verkhovna Rada.

The coup attempt ended with the junta standing down on 21 August. Kravchuk's official biography claimed he left the CPU on 19 August, though the archives of the party show that he was present at the final meeting of the Politburo on 22 August. It is unclear why he was present at the Politburo's meeting. Following the coup's failure, the Verkhovna Rada voted to ban the party as a criminal organisation for its support of the junta. It is unclear what Kravchuk planned to do if the putsch succeeded; both Wilson and Motyl argue that it was impossible for Kravchuk to become completely loyal to the putschists; Wilson reasons that Kravchuk would likely wait for the junta to weaken before returning to advocating sovereignty, while Motyl describes it as "implausible to argue" that Kravchuk could have supported the junta on the basis that, at the least, it would lead to the end of the powers and prestige he had accumulated since 1990.

Following the Act of Declaration of Independence, Kravchuk was vested with presidential powers, thus becoming both de facto and de jure head of state. Later that year, on 5 December 1991, voters formally elected him president in Ukraine's first presidential election. Just a few days before on 1 December, the voters voted overwhelmingly to secede from the Soviet Union—a move which Kravchuk now fully supported. This made Kravchuk the first head of state of independent Ukraine.

== Presidency ==
Kravchuk was inaugurated as Ukraine's president on 5 December 1991 in a ceremony conducted by the Verkhovna Rada. At the same event, the 1922 Treaty on the Creation of the Union of Soviet Socialist Republics was renounced by the Rada. The event had heavy symbolism in Ukraine, and, according to D'Anieri, Kravchuk and Kuzio, was regarded by some as a renunciation of the 1654 Pereiaslav Agreement, which had led to the incorporation of the Cossack Hetmanate into the Russian Empire. Kravchuk, recognising the gravity of the ceremony, said, "The empire which endured for 337 years no longer exists, and Ukraine is the author of its destruction."

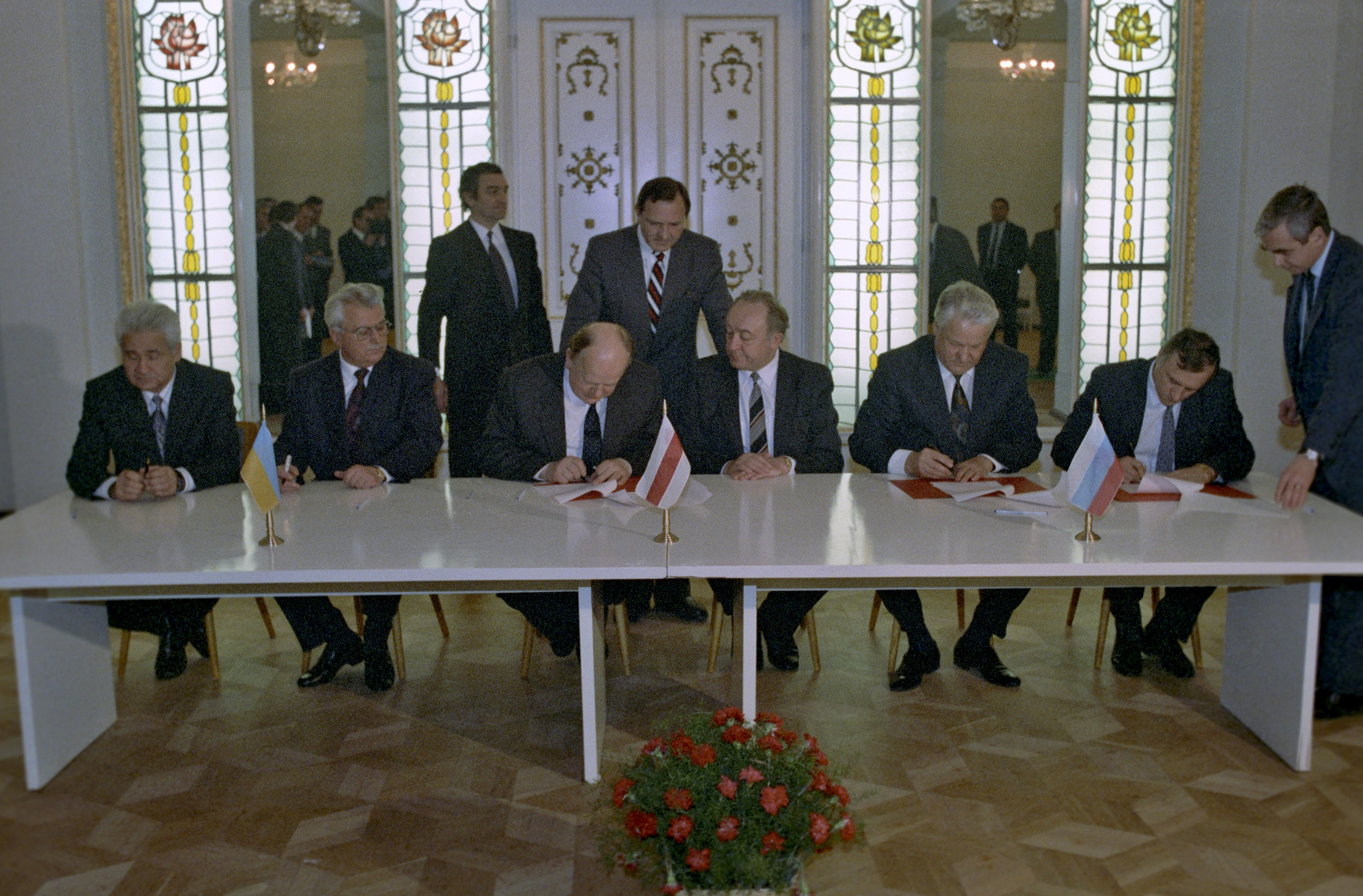
Ukrainian president Leonid Kravchuk and Russian president Boris Yeltsin signing the Belavezha Accords, dissolving the Soviet Union, 8 December 1991

Kravchuk's primary support base as president was an informal coalition of national communists and moderate national democrats, who emerged from the Ukrainian Soviet dissident movement. Kuzio describes Kravchuk's circle in this time as a "party of power" and notes that he deliberately avoided declaring a political party or movement. According to Kuzio, Kravchuk's reticence in formalising his movement was based on both a desire to avoid negative attention from anti-communists and the general unpopularity of political parties in Ukraine. As part of what Robert Kravchuk refers to as a "Faustian bargain", the national democrats, chiefly Rukh, supported Kravchuk and his formerly-communist nomenklatura allies in their nation-building policies in return for an impromptu agreement against political and economic reforms.

Kravchuk was strongly opposed to Viacheslav Chornovil's proposals for federalism, an attitude which Kuzio credits as being shaped by the defeat of Ukrainian forces in the War of Independence. He introduced a system of "presidential representatives" (Ukrainian: представники, romanised: predstavnyky) at the oblast and local levels, similar to the French prefect system. The presidential representatives, legalised with the support of the SPU, New Ukraine and most national democrats (including the opposition Rukh party), were given broad powers, including implementation of local budgets, acts of the central government and suspension of local officeholders. Bohdan Harasymiw of the University of Alberta blames Kravchuk's presidential representative system for weakening grassroots democracy.

=== Economy ===
Popular support for Ukrainian independence had been largely motivated by dissatisfaction with the economic policies of the Soviet government. According to Wilson, there was widespread belief among Ukrainians that Soviet rule had brought about net outflows of income resulting from over-taxation, under-investment and underpricing of goods produced in Ukraine (particularly agricultural products, iron, steel and coal). Both the nomenklatura and the general population had positive expectations for the economy coming out of independence; for the latter, it meant that the perceived inequalities in the Soviet system (which had been driving the 1989–1991 revolution from its outset) could finally be brought down, while the former saw it as a chance to use wealth accumulated under the Soviet era to establish control over Ukraine's businesses, particularly industrial enterprises and banks.

Real annual GDP growth of Ukraine, 1990–2011. Kravchuk's presidency was marked by significant GDP contractions.

During Kravchuk's presidency, there was general agreement among Ukraine's politicians that while economic reforms were necessary, neoliberal shock therapy policies, as in Russia, were undesirable. Kravchuk was left uncertain of how to deal with the economy; he openly stated in January 1993 that if he knew what to do, he would have told the country's government and economic managers to do it. Robert Kravchuk describes Kravchuk's rule as a time in which economic reforms were "effectively postponed", noting that he focused on nation-building. His presidency was marked, according to R. Kravchuk, by "massive emissions of cheap credit and budget subsidies to industry, paired with the imposition of administrative controls over prices and exchange rates". These policies unsuccessfully sought to reduce inflationary pressures, and R. Kravchuk notes that Kravchuk appeared to see increased liquidity of enterprises as a means for reducing inflation by increasing productivity — according to R. Kravchuk, Kravchuk viewed inflation as being caused by a lack of goods compared to the money supply.

A lack of economic reforms was implicitly accepted as part of the de facto coalition between the national communists and national democrats. Kravchuk granted powerful economic positions to nomenklatura elites, especially those from eastern Ukraine, during his presidency, something economist Volodymyr Zviglyanich criticised as leading to the retrenchment of the Soviet-era elite under Kravchuk's leadership. Industrial restructuring and liberalisation of prices and trade did not occur, nor did reductions of loans and financial aid to state-owned enterprises and farms. Low levels of state control led to rampant corruption, including buying raw materials sold between post-Soviet states at below-market prices before selling them to the West or obtaining government-backed loans.

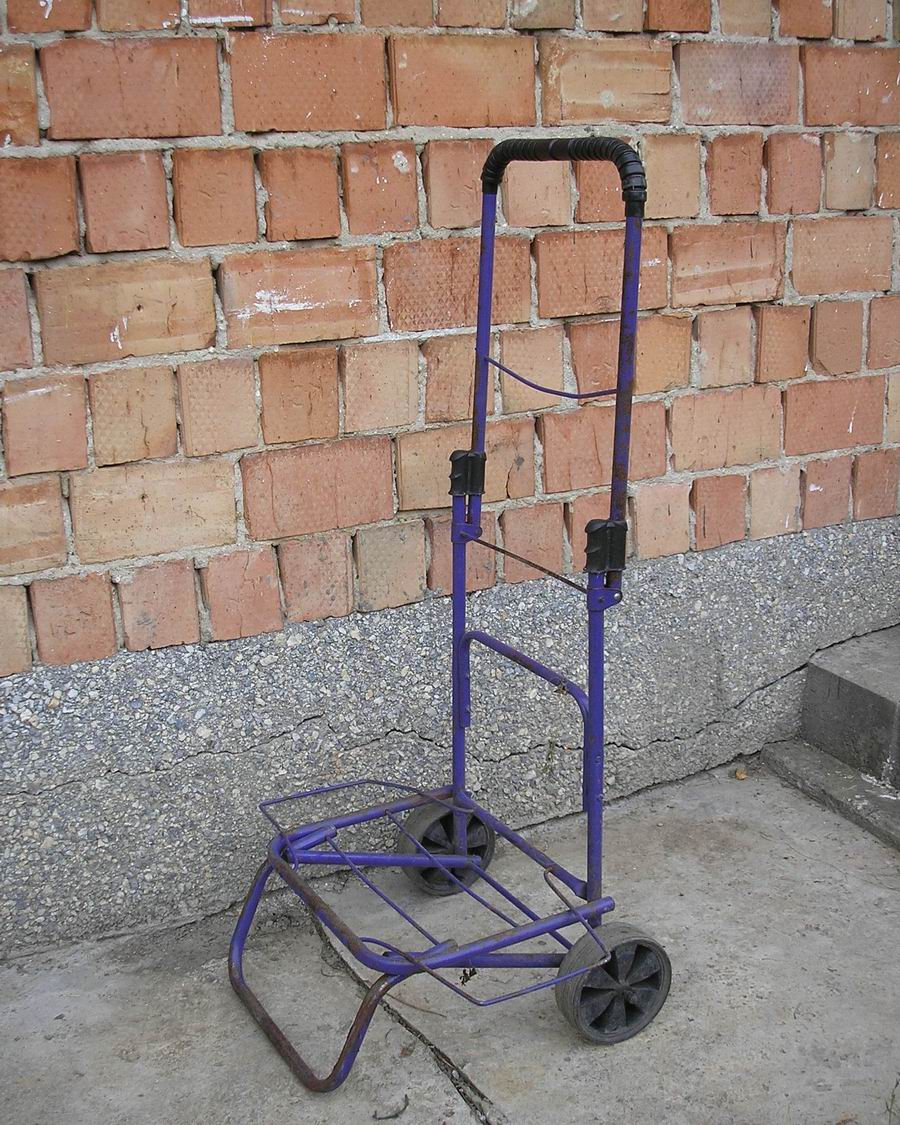
Kravchuchky, colloquially named after Kravchuk, were used by Ukrainians to engage in shuttle trade during his presidency due to hyperinflation

Ukraine under Kravchuk's presidency fell into economic depression from 1992; the country's gross domestic product dropped by 9.9% in 1992, 14.2% in 1993 and 23% in 1994, ultimately standing at half of 1992 levels by 1995. Inflation reached a peak of 5000% in 1993, erasing the population's savings and reducing the purchasing power of wages, pensions and all other sources of income. Similar economic declines were found across other post-Soviet states, with researcher Verena Fritz writing in 2007 that the "best-performing" states had lost 20–35% of their GDPs in the early 1990s as a result of the Soviet Union's dissolution. Business networks that emerged in eastern Ukraine in the 1970s (such as the Dnipropetrovsk Mafia and the Donetsk Clan) became greatly enriched as a result of Ukrainian independence, obtaining their money through both illegal and semi-legal means using wealth which either had been accumulated under the Soviet Union or was invested by high-ranking individuals in communist organisations (particularly the Komsomol and CPU). The Ukrainian state's weak organisation at the time allowed these business and organised crime networks to gather economic assets. Kravchuk was politically connected to these networks, and their members became the Ukrainian oligarchs later in the 1990s. A model of hand trucks, popular among Ukrainians to engage in shuttle trade during the economic crisis, became informally known as a kravchuchka after Kravchuk.

=== Foreign policy ===
As part of the agreement between the national communists and national-democrats, the latter group largely dictated foreign policy during Kravchuk's presidency. Dmytro Pavlychko, Bohdan Horyn and Serhiy Holovatyi, all influential People's Deputies on the Foreign Affairs Committee, were longtime dissident activists who belonged to Rukh and the pro-Kravchuk Republican and Democratic parties. This policy came to an end following the 1994 parliamentary election, when Communist Borys Oliynyk became head of the Foreign Affairs Committee and Socialist Volodymyr Mukhin the Defence and Security Committee. Kravchuk took a pro-European stance, developing relations with the West and signing a cooperation accord with the European Union. He opposed membership in the EU, Council of Europe and General Agreement on Tariffs and Trade.

Kravchuk welcomed NATO enlargement, and advocated for Ukrainian NATO membership as "the best guarantee to Ukraine's security". Kravchuk, as other Ukrainian politicians of pro-Western inclination, saw NATO membership as part of integration with European political structures, which, in their view, Ukraine was separated from as a result of Soviet rule. Kravchuk's antipathy towards the Commonwealth of Independent States also led him to support integration into NATO, and, in February 1994, Ukraine became the first member of the Partnership for Peace within the CIS.

==== Russia and denuclearisation ====
Kravchuk found common ground with the national democrats in Ukraine's foreign policy being a counterweight to Russian influence in the post-Soviet sphere; Russia's political establishment was hostile to Ukrainian independence, and politicians in Russia stoked anti-Ukrainian sentiment by claiming that Ukrainian independence would be short-lived before it became part of Russia. The primary disputes between Russia and Ukraine under Kravchuk were the status of Ukraine's post-Soviet nuclear arsenal, which Russia demanded they hand over; the Black Sea Fleet — Russia and Ukraine both sought all or part of it; and the city of Sevastopol, located in the Crimean peninsula, which Russia claimed as its own. Kravchuk's government refused to support efforts to transform the Commonwealth of Independent States into a supranational legal entity or an instrument for post-Soviet integration, refusing to sign the CIS collective defence treaty or ratify the CIS Charter.

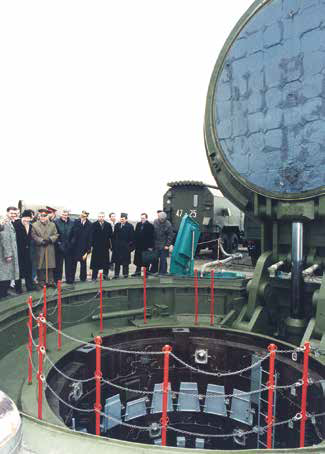
Ukrainian and US officials at a UR-100N ICBM silo in Pervomaisk, 1994

Negotiations over the nuclear arsenal would prove to be the most consequential point of Kravchuk's presidency. From its independence to late 1994, the United States and Russia sought to isolate Ukraine, with the US viewing Ukraine as a rogue state for refusing to surrender its post-Soviet nuclear arsenal. Ukraine, in contrast, viewed Russian refusal to accept Ukrainian independence as permanent with alarm and viewed nuclear weapons as a way to obtain security guarantees from the US. At the height of tensions over denuclearisation, Russia cut off its supply of natural gas to Ukraine in an effort to force Ukraine to surrender its nuclear arsenal and control of Sevastopol Naval Base. Kravchuk initially acceded to Russian demands, but later backtracked after an overwhelmingly-negative response from the Ukrainian public. In January 1994 a deal was reached, as part of which Ukraine would surrender its nuclear arsenal in return for American and Russian recognition of Ukraine's sovereignty and Ukraine being allowed into the Partnership for Peace. This was followed by the Budapest Memorandum, signed on 5 December 1994 at the Budapest summit of the Organisation for Security and Co-operation in Europe. As part of the memorandum, Ukraine committed to giving up its nuclear weapons in exchange for security guarantees from Russia.

Kravchuk's foreign policy towards Russia, as well as Russian opposition to Ukraine's existence as an independent state, ultimately would play a part in his 1994 electoral defeat, as a significant portion of the population of eastern and southern Ukraine favoured closer relations with Russia. Leonid Kuchma advocated for such ties in the 1994 presidential election, playing a role in his eventual victory. The anti-Ukrainian rhetoric espoused by Russian politicians also consolidated Ukrainian independence, according to University of Cologne professor Gerhard Simon.

==== Balkans, Romania and Moldova ====
Ukraine under Kravchuk was one of the first countries to recognise Croatia and Slovenia as independent states; it was the third country (after Slovenia and Lithuania) to recognise Croatian independence and the first United Nations member state at the time to do so. Kravchuk had maintained positive relations with Croatian president Franjo Tuđman since May 1991, when he received him as part of an official visit prior to both countries becoming independent. Kravchuk additionally saw parallels between the Croatian War of Independence and a potential Russia–Ukraine war, and further sought to harmonise Ukrainian foreign policy with that of western European states as part of his broader efforts to demonstrate Ukraine's solidarity with the West and Ukraine's publicly stated ambition to be treated as a European country. The Verkhovna Rada sent 1,200 peacekeepers to Yugoslavia as part of the United Nations Protection Force by 1993, in what was viewed by the government as both a method of increasing Ukraine's international prestige and providing training for its soldiers. Kravchuk's government opposed Operation Deny Flight and Kravchuk himself endorsed a Russian call for debate at the United Nations Security Council, viewing the UNSC as the only body capable of authorising a NATO military response.

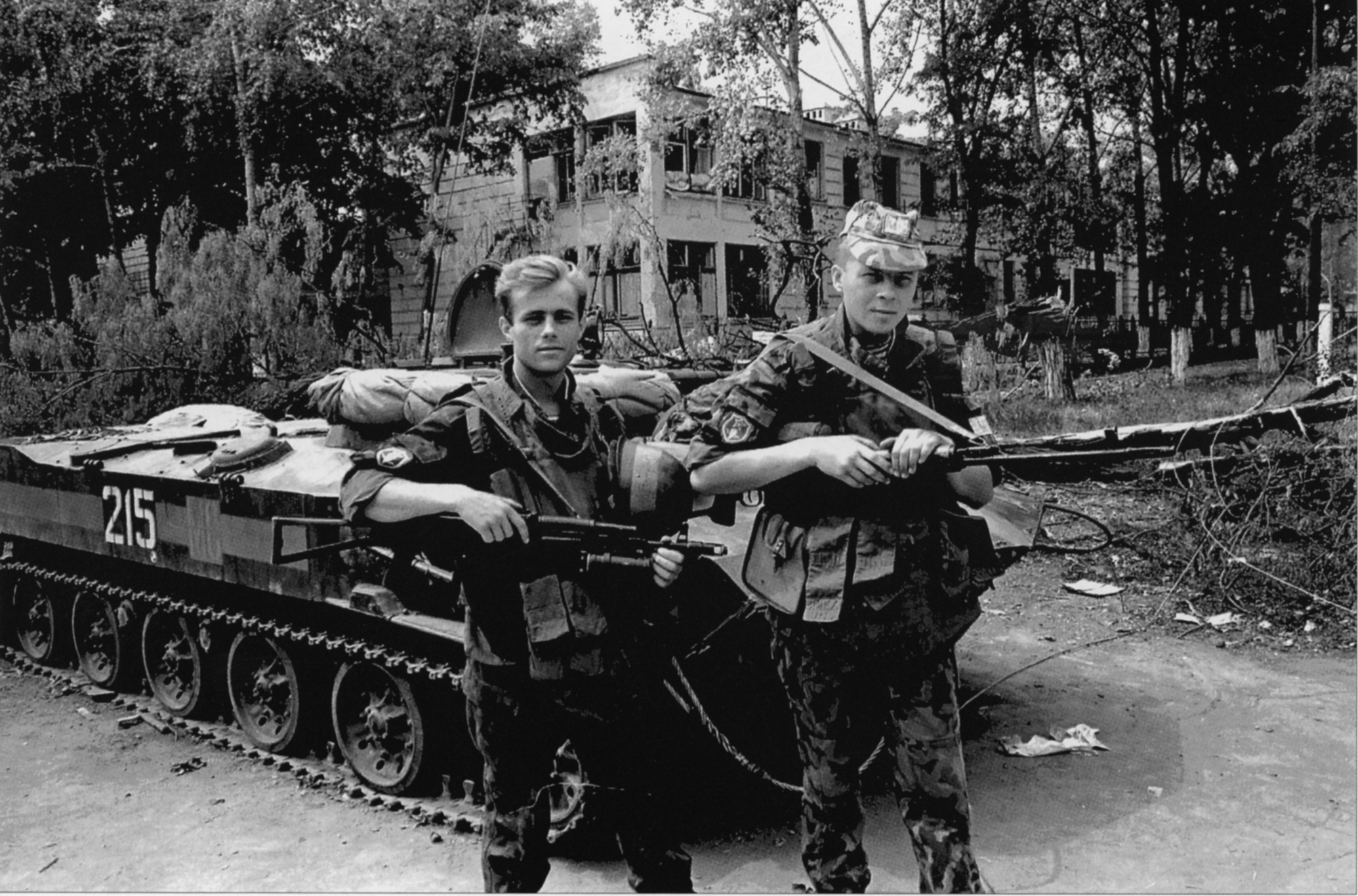
Transnistrian separatist forces during the Transnistrian War. At various points in his presidency, Kravchuk supported either Moldova or Transnistria.

Romania–Ukraine relations were tense from Ukraine's independence. The post-revolution government of Romania initially refused to recognise the border established following the 1940 Soviet occupation of Bessarabia and Northern Bukovina, with the Parliament of Romania publicly declaring the results of the independence referendum to be "null and void" in parts of Ukraine which had been Romanian before 1940. No Romanian government followed up on the 1991 declaration by the parliament. Romania was one of two neighbouring countries (alongside Russia) which refused to sign an agreement with Ukraine on inviolability of borders. In retaliation, Ukraine cited the 1947 Paris Peace Treaties, which recognised the 1940 border. Romania, in return, cited the Paris Peace Treaties as justification for its claim to Snake Island, which prompted further disputes over the Romania–Ukraine border regarding the legitimacy of the unratified 1948 treaty that transferred Snake Island to Soviet Ukraine. The border dispute between the two countries was ultimately resolved in 1997, when Romania and Ukraine signed the Treaty of Friendship and Good Neighbourliness, followed by the 2003 Treaty on the Status of the Romanian–Ukrainian State Border, as prerequisites for Romanian membership in NATO and the EU.

Kravchuk's position on the status of Moldova and the Transnistrian conflict varied throughout his presidency, with Pål Kolstø at the University of Oslo and Andrei Edemsky and Natalya Kalashnikova from the Institute of Slavonic and Balkan Studies in Moscow comparing it to the movement of a pendulum. In the spring of 1992, while Russo-Ukrainian tensions were at a height over the Black Sea Fleet, Ukraine established a 50-kilometre security zone along its border with the self-proclaimed state of Transnistria with the intention of intercepting Cossack volunteers crossing into Moldova from Ukrainian territory. Ukraine further protested Russian plans to place the 14th Guards Combined Arms Army in Transnistria as a peacekeeping force and advocated for Romania to be permitted to attend negotiations. Later in the spring, during negotiations, Ukraine expressed support for the Transnistrian government to be included in talks, matching Russia's position. As the conflict in Transnistria escalated, Ukraine moved away from the Russian position, with deputy Foreign Minister Borys Tarasiuk stating that Moldova should remain united with a Transnistrian autonomous region and that Transnistrian representatives should participate in negotiations as members of the Moldovan delegation. The next day, following a discussion with Yeltsin in Dagomys, Kravchuk again moved to a pro-Russian position.

Kravchuk's approach to Transnistria was criticised by the national-democratic opposition and in Transnistrian media for opposite reasons; Rukh accused Kravchuk and the Verkhovna Rada of supporting "Russian aggression against Moldova", and according to Eduard Baidaus of Red Deer College, some Ukrainian authors linked Russia's intervention in Transnistria to their support for separatism in the Donbas and Crimea. Conversely, Transnistrian media castigated Kravchuk for his refusal to directly intervene in Moldova, portraying him as a traitor to the Ukrainian people. (Note: Other than Ukraine, Moldova is the only other former republic of the Soviet Union where Ukrainians are a larger number of the population than Russians, and Transnistria was part of the Ukrainian SSR prior to 1940. During the Transnistrian War, Transnistrian forces used the image of poet and national symbol Taras Shevchenko and the concept of the "people's Ukraine" in wartime propaganda.)

==== Central Europe ====
Poland was the first country to recognise Ukraine's independence, doing so on 2 December 1991. Hungary followed by being the first country to establish an embassy in Ukraine, doing so by upgrading its consulate in Kyiv to an embassy.

Kravchuk's foreign policy towards the countries of Central Europe was informed by the belief that Ukraine had an identity which was fundamentally Central European in nature. As evidence of this viewpoint, Ukrainian officials cited several factors, including Ukraine's geographical location in the centre of Europe, dynastic ties between the Kievan Rus' and the medieval dynasties of other European states, the presence of the Danube on Ukrainian territory, and a relationship between Poles and Ukrainians dating back centuries (as stated by Zlenko). Kravchuk unsuccessfully advocated for Ukraine to be admitted to the Visegrád Triangle, saying to the press at a May 1992 meeting with Polish president Lech Wałęsa that "a triangle is an excellent geometrical figure, but a quadrilateral is an even better one". In spite of Polish sympathies to Ukraine's claim to a status as a Central European state, it was eventually decided by all three members of the Viségrad Triangle (Poland, Hungary and Czechoslovakia) that adding Ukraine, a post-Soviet state which had undertaken no meaningful economic reforms, would ultimately harm their chances of joining NATO and the European Economic Community and antagonise Russia by creating an image of Central European states impeding on what the former regarded as its sphere of influence.

=== Military policy, Black Sea Fleet dispute ===
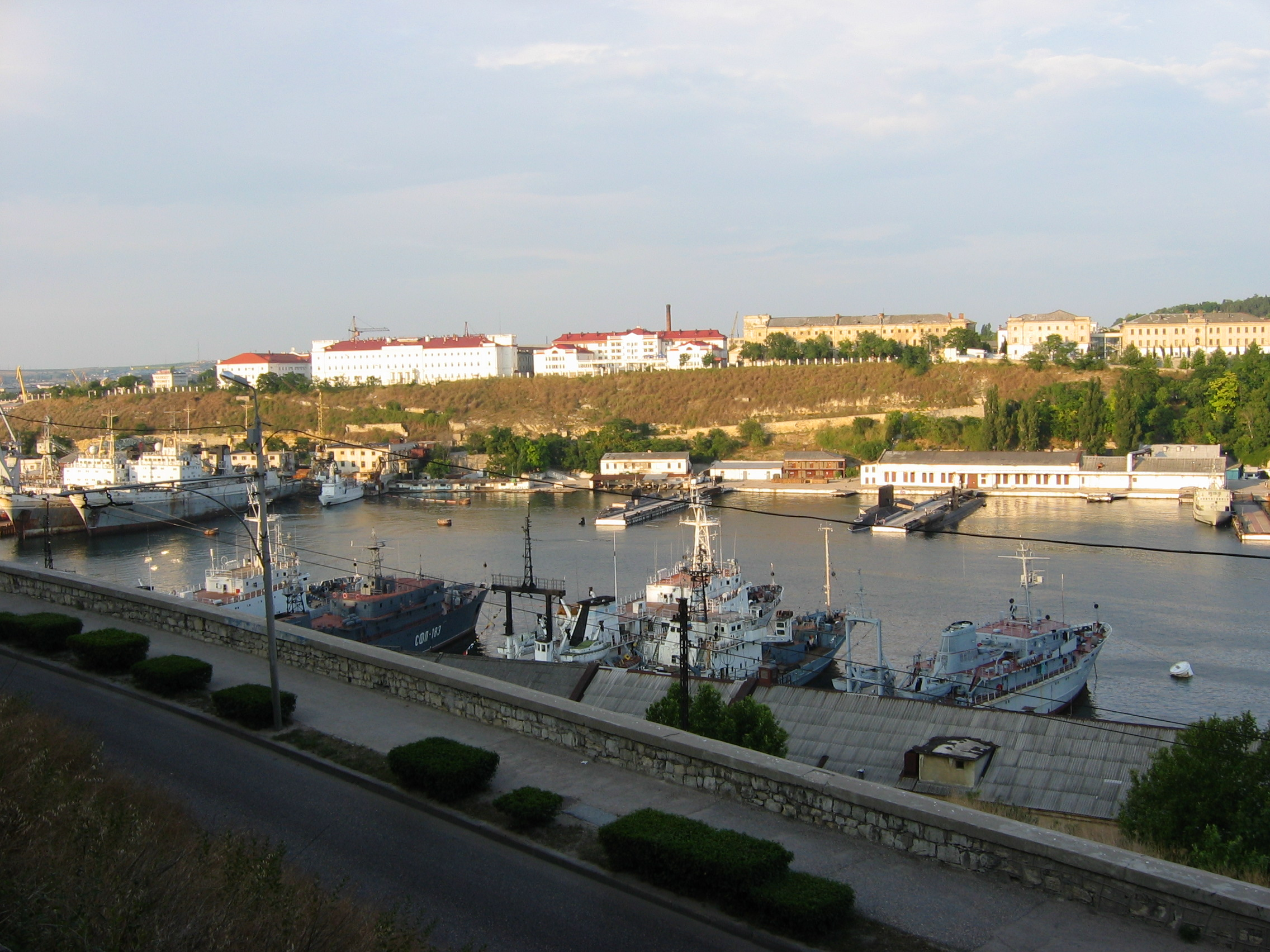
Ships docked at Sevastopol Naval Base, 2004. Sevastopol and its naval base, as well as the Black Sea Fleet that was based there, were at the centre of a dispute between Ukraine and Russia throughout Kravchuk's presidency.

Kravchuk advocated for significant attention to be given to the formation of an independent Armed Forces of Ukraine, citing the failure of the Ukrainian War of Independence in 1917. Following the failure of the 1991 coup attempt, Kravchuk lent his support to Kostyantyn Morozov, a military commander who was active in advocacy for a separate Ukrainian military and had established the groundwork for such a body in the autumn of 1991. In doing so, Kravchuk was joined by the national democrats and nationalists, who supported building a military out of the existing Soviet military in Ukraine. Shaken by the coup attempt, neither the Soviet military apparatus in Moscow nor conservative communists were able to mount meaningful resistance to the plan, and the Armed Forces of Ukraine were established soon after the December 1991 referendum confirmed Ukrainian independence.

Under Kravchuk, Ukraine led efforts to prevent reintegration efforts within the Commonwealth of Independent States, against the wishes of Russia. Robert H. Donaldson argues that Kravchuk saw the CIS as a "step towards complete separation from Russia", and notes that Ukraine was particularly concerned with preventing reintegration of post-Soviet states through the CIS. Kravchuk led efforts, joined by Azerbaijan, Moldova and Turkmenistan to prevent the adoption of integration measures, such as a shared legal system between CIS members and CIS citizenship, which would have led to closer integration between the governmental structures of Russia and other member states. A particularly sensitive issue for Ukraine was efforts by Russia to create a singular CIS military, known as the United Armed Forces; Kravchuk's immediate moves to establish an independent military sought to prevent the formation of such a structure. With additional pressure from Azerbaijan and Moldova, Russia eventually agreed to allow CIS member states to establish their own militaries alongside the United Armed Forces. The latter structure soon collapsed as all other members followed Kravchuk's lead in establishing an independent military.

The Black Sea Fleet, based in Crimea, soon became a sticking point in Ukraine's efforts to bring Soviet Army units within its borders under its command and a source of dispute between Ukraine and Russia. The reasons for this are disputed; John Jaworsky of the Harvard Ukrainian Research Institute wrote in 1996 that Ukrainian political leadership's inability and unwillingness to assert control over the BSF had allowed Russia to claim it, while Tyler Felgenhauer of Princeton University wrote in February 1999 that the dispute began when both the Ukrainian and Russian sides made maximalist claims on the fleet. Morozov and Minister of the Defence Industry and Conversion Viktor Antonov stated in a January 1992 press conference that the BSF would remain Ukrainian and that Ukraine was only willing to surrender ships carrying nuclear weapons, which were to be transferred to the CIS. Russia claimed ownership of the entire fleet, as well as the Crimean city of Sevastopol, which was controlled by Ukraine.

In April 1992, the BSF dispute reached the brink of conflict. Kravchuk declared that month that a Ukrainian Navy would be established, based in Crimea. Yeltsin, in response, ordered the BSF to raise Saint Andrew's Flag, the recently inaugurated ensign of the Russian Navy. The BSF's commanders deployed military police with armoured personnel carriers on Sevastopol's streets in response to rumours that Ukrainian nationalist militias were coming from Kyiv to take over the fleet, and a Ukrainian parliamentary delegation was subsequently dispatched to Crimea to demand that the BSF stand down. Dmytro Pavlychko, a member of the delegation, described Yeltsin's issuance of orders to the BSF as tantamount to a declaration of war. The situation was eventually defused when Yeltsin and Kravchuk agreed by phone to retreat from their previous claims over the entire BSF and establish a joint commission on the status of the BSF.

=== State-building ===
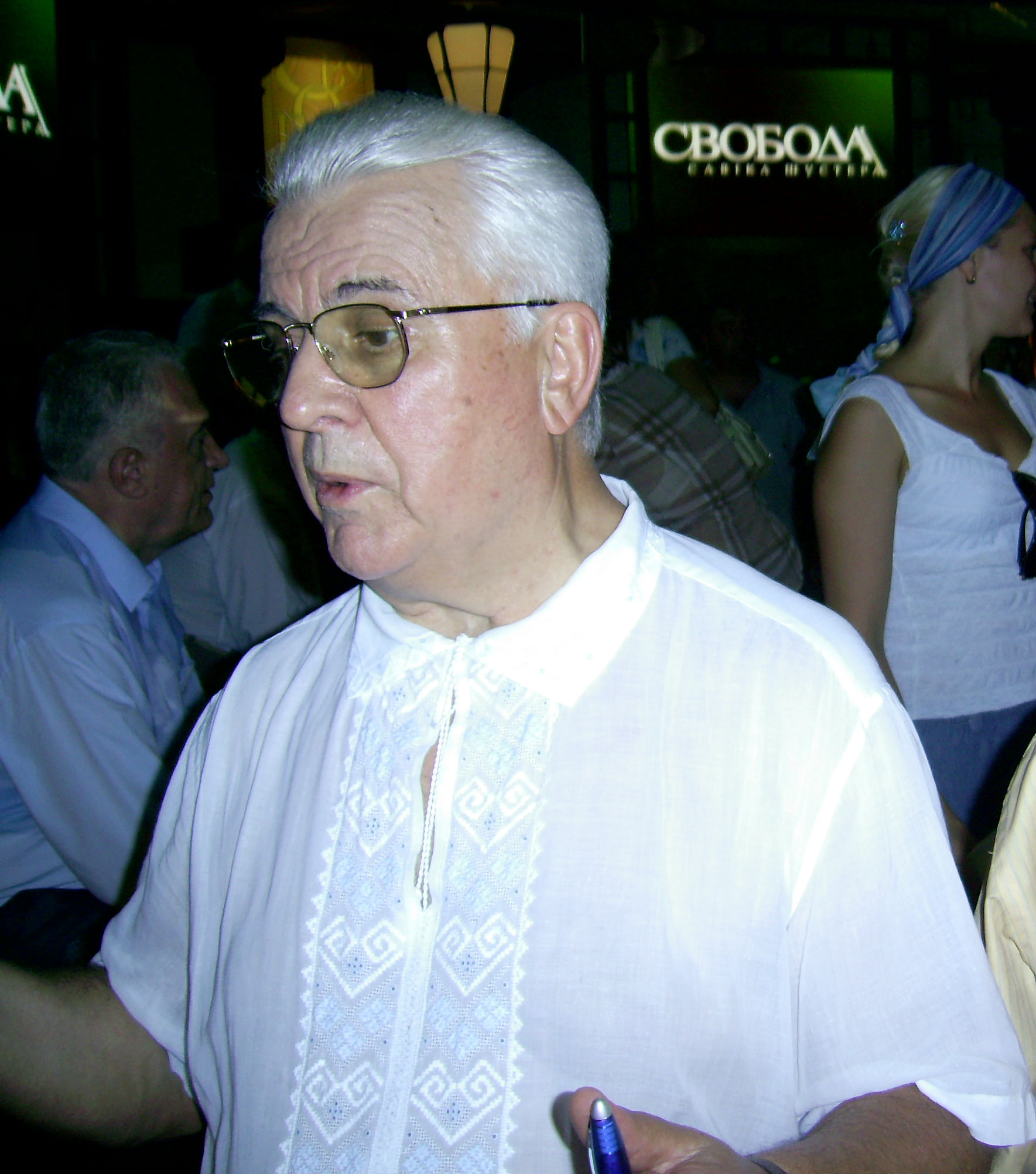
Kravchuk wearing a vyshyvanka

In contrast to advice from the West, as well as the policies of Yeltsin in neighbouring Russia, Kravchuk saw state-building as more important than economic reforms, an assessment Motyl agrees with. He believed in the promotion of national concepts in order to provide a basis to construct authoritative state institutions, which, due to prolonged Soviet rule, were nonexistent at the time of Ukraine's independence. The nascent Ukrainian state, unlike the Ukrainian People's Republic in 1917, inherited a 'quasi-state' more developed in institutions than its predecessor, but these institutions remained insufficient for a modern government. Difficulties also existed in the differences of historical memory between formerly-Austrian west Ukraine and the remainder of the country, which had been ruled by Russia; the lack of Ukrainian identity among residents of the south and east (a matter that made acceptance of a unified national identity more difficult); and the consensus that state- and nation-building needed to be pursued at the same time as democratisation and economic reform.

Kravchuk had been partial to state-building at least since May 1991, when he began establishing Ukrainian institutions within the legal framework of the Declaration of State Sovereignty. During his presidency, Kravchuk's state-building efforts increased as he sought to establish a unified Orthodox Church of Ukraine as the state religion and establish a strong presidency. While these efforts resulted in increased foreign recognition of Ukraine, they were ultimately unsuccessful; the unified church project fizzled out c. 1993, while Kravchuk's advocacy for a strong presidency was opposed by the writers of the constitution of Ukraine, who placed further power in the hands of the Verkhovna Rada in response to his demands.

Spurred on by the conflicts with Russia, Kravchuk used Ukrainians' enmity of Russians to encourage nation-building, engaging in othering of Russia and suggesting that the existence of a Ukrainian Navy would enable the protection of the nascent state and the nation. At the same time, Kravchuk, fearing the potential of a backlash from Russians in Ukraine, went to lengths to ensure they would remain loyal; official statements used the phrase "people of Ukraine", rather than "Ukrainian people", and used the term "Muscovites" to criticise Russians, rather than ethnic Russians in general or in Ukraine. Additionally, Kravchuk's government tacitly accepted the usage of the Russian language in population centres while seeking to improve the state of the Ukrainian language.

Kravchuk additionally pursued the adoption of a unified Ukrainian symbology, providing public endorsement to the Ukrainian Autocephalous Orthodox Church and establishing the blue-yellow flag of Ukraine, the tryzub (Ukraine's coat of arms) and the song shche ne vmerla Ukrainy (the national anthem of Ukraine) as state symbols. Kravchuk also sought to portray himself as linked to Ukrainian symbols, including those of the state and images of rural life, which he often pictured himself associated with. In There Is Such a State — Ukraine, a collection of his writings, Kravchuk was depicted as, in various photographs, a Cossack hetman and surrounded by individuals wearing traditional Ukrainian clothing. While Kravchuk's personal popularity decreased throughout his presidency, these efforts increased respect held by the population for the presidency, leading to the emergence of a belief that Kravchuk was not living up to the expectations he had established around the office.

However, Kravchuk's policies were not without their detractors. Particularly among his opponents on the left, such as Oleksandr Moroz, the "party of power"'s focus of defence and state-building over economic reforms and anti-poverty measures were viewed negatively. Kuchma additionally ran on such a position in the 1994 presidential election, while Kravchuk, having effectively achieved no economic reforms during his presidency (and feeling that such a thing was impossible after the 1994 election returned an anti-Kravchuk Verkhovna Rada), embraced state-building as a key part of his electoral campaign.

=== Downfall ===
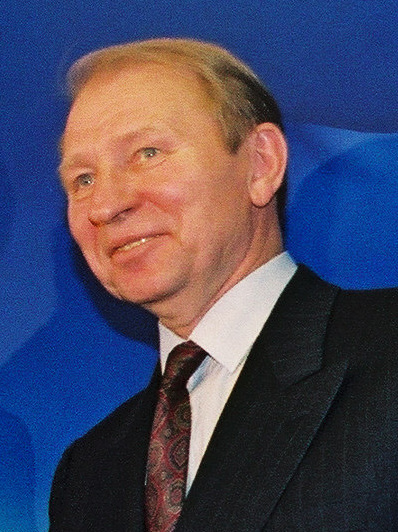
Leonid Kuchma (pictured here in 1995) defeated Kravchuk in the 1994 Ukrainian presidential election. He previously served as Kravchuk's prime minister.

Independent trade unions of coal miners in the eastern Donbas region began striking on 2 September 1992, in protest of Kravchuk's refusal to guarantee that they would be granted workers' benefits and compensation. These strikes were joined by transport workers in February 1993.

In a bid to stem the strikes, Kravchuk dissolved the Verkhovna Rada on 17 June 1993 and called snap parliamentary and presidential elections for the next year. While observers had expected low turnout and apathy, 75% of Ukrainians turned up to vote. The result demonstrated an emerging ideological clash between eastern Ukraine and Crimea, where the refounded Communist Party of Ukraine was strong, and central and western Ukraine, where the national-democratic Rukh performed well. The New York Times quoted Volodymyr Lanovyi, an economist who had been fired by Kravchuk for advocating for market reforms, as saying "Although we do not have final results, it is clear that Kravchuk is the loser. The big turnout is a big moral blow to him." Kravchuk's former prime minister Leonid Kuchma, who had announced his candidacy in the presidential election, won 91% of the vote in his district. Ivan Plyushch, Chairman of the Verkhovna Rada and another rival of Kravchuk, also won his seat by a majority of votes, as did Chornovil, who was expected to again face off against Kravchuk in the presidential election.

Following the first round of the parliamentary election, Kravchuk called for the presidential election, scheduled for June 1994, to be cancelled in a 25 March address and that he required emergency powers from the Rada to undertake economic reforms and fight organised crime. A total of 120 primarily national-democratic deputies supported Kravchuk's call for greater powers; Rukh reluctantly endorsed his demand to postpone the elections, arguing that to do so without reforming electoral laws would cause a political crisis. The Communist Party soon took control of the Rada's leadership and blocked efforts to postpone or cancel the presidential election.

During the election, Kravchuk focused heavily on his state-building credentials, polarising the election around linguistic and ethnic differences by portraying Kuchma as a Russophile. Kravchuk baselessly accused Kuchma of being anti-Ukrainian, seeking to revive the Soviet Union and intending to give Russia both Crimea and the Black Sea Fleet, while Kuchma's supporters emphasised his support for strong presidential power and previous tenure as director of state-owned rocket manufacturer Pivdenmash. The role of the economy played a crucial role in the election, despite the focus on national issues, as those in southern and eastern Ukraine, viewing reestablishment of ties with Russia as a means to revive the economy, saw Kuchma's advocacy for the Russian language as a sign that he would pursue such a policy. Likewise, Kravchuk's focus on Ukrainian culture was supported by Ukrainophones, who saw building links with Europe as the best way out of the economic crisis. Kravchuk ultimately lost the election, with 45.06% of the vote to Kuchma's 52.1% in the second round. Following the election, Kravchuk accepted defeat and oversaw the peaceful transition of power to Kuchma. In doing so, Kravchuk set a precedent for peaceful transition and rotation of power that has since governed Ukraine.

== Post-presidency ==
Official portraits of Kravchuk, Verkhovna Rada (1994–2006)

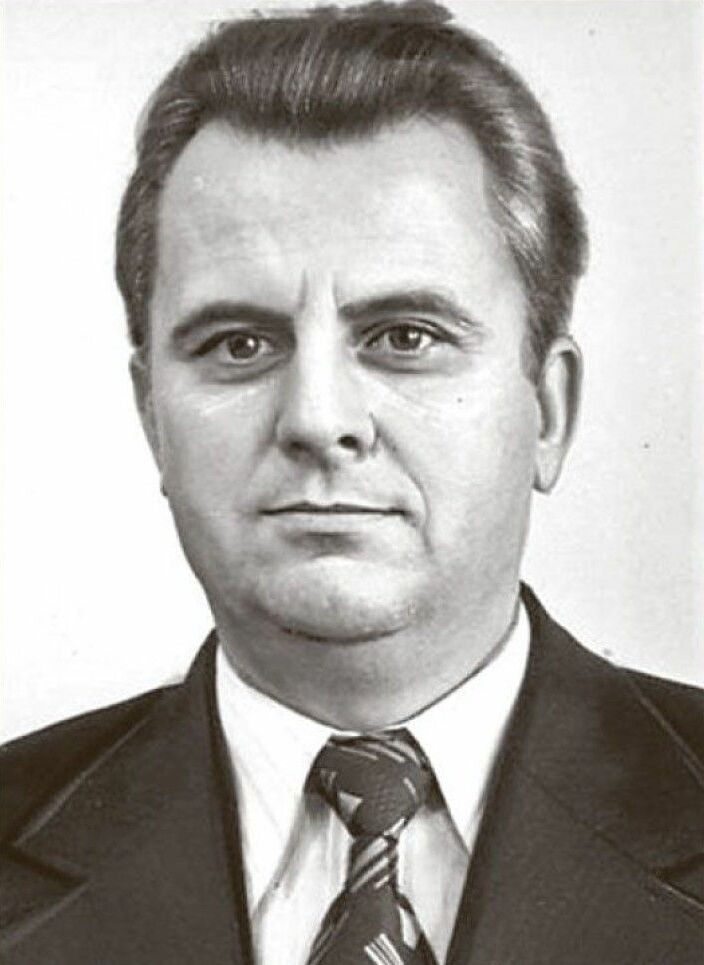
2nd (1994–1998)

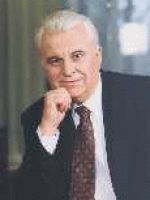
3rd (1998–2002)

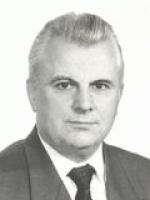
4th (2002–2006)

After his defeat to Kuchma, Kravchuk returned to the Verkhovna Rada, where he served as an independent People's Deputy for Terebovlia (a city in the western Ternopil Oblast) from 1994 to 1998. He was a member of the Culture and Spirituality Committee. After leaving the presidential residence, Kravchuk moved to a state-owned dacha in Kyiv's upper-class Koncha-Zaspa neighbourhood, following a Soviet-era tradition of government officials being granted state-owned dachas for life. This tradition later continued under Kravchuk's successors Kuchma and Viktor Yanukovych. Kravchuk was awarded multiple honours following his presidency, including the title of Hero of Ukraine in August 2001.

During the 1998 parliamentary election, Kravchuk headed the electoral list of the Social Democratic Party of Ukraine (united) (Ukrainian: Соцiал-демократична партія України (об'єднана), romanised: Sotsial-demokratychna partiia Ukrainy (obiednana), SDPU(o)), despite not being a member of the party. According to Wilson, Kravchuk was among the "many" national communists who aligned with the SDPU(o) during the election, also including former Prime Minister Yevhen Marchuk. The party won 17 seats in the election, largely through vote buying in rural Zakarpattia Oblast. After the election, Kravchuk joined the SDPU(o), becoming a member of its politburo and leadership council in October 1998. Kravchuk left the Culture and Spirituality Committee after the 1998 election, joining the Foreign Affairs Committee. In spite of his previous state-building efforts and usage of Ukrainian nationalism during the 1994 election, as a member of the SDPU(o) Kravchuk embraced Russophilia, advocating for protections for the Russian language and improved ties with Russia.

Kravchuk was re-elected in 2002, this time as the fifth candidate on the SDPU(o) list. From 2002 to 2006, Kravchuk was leader of the SDPU(o) faction in the Verkhovna Rada.

=== Viktor Yanukovych and Ne Tak (2004–2010) ===
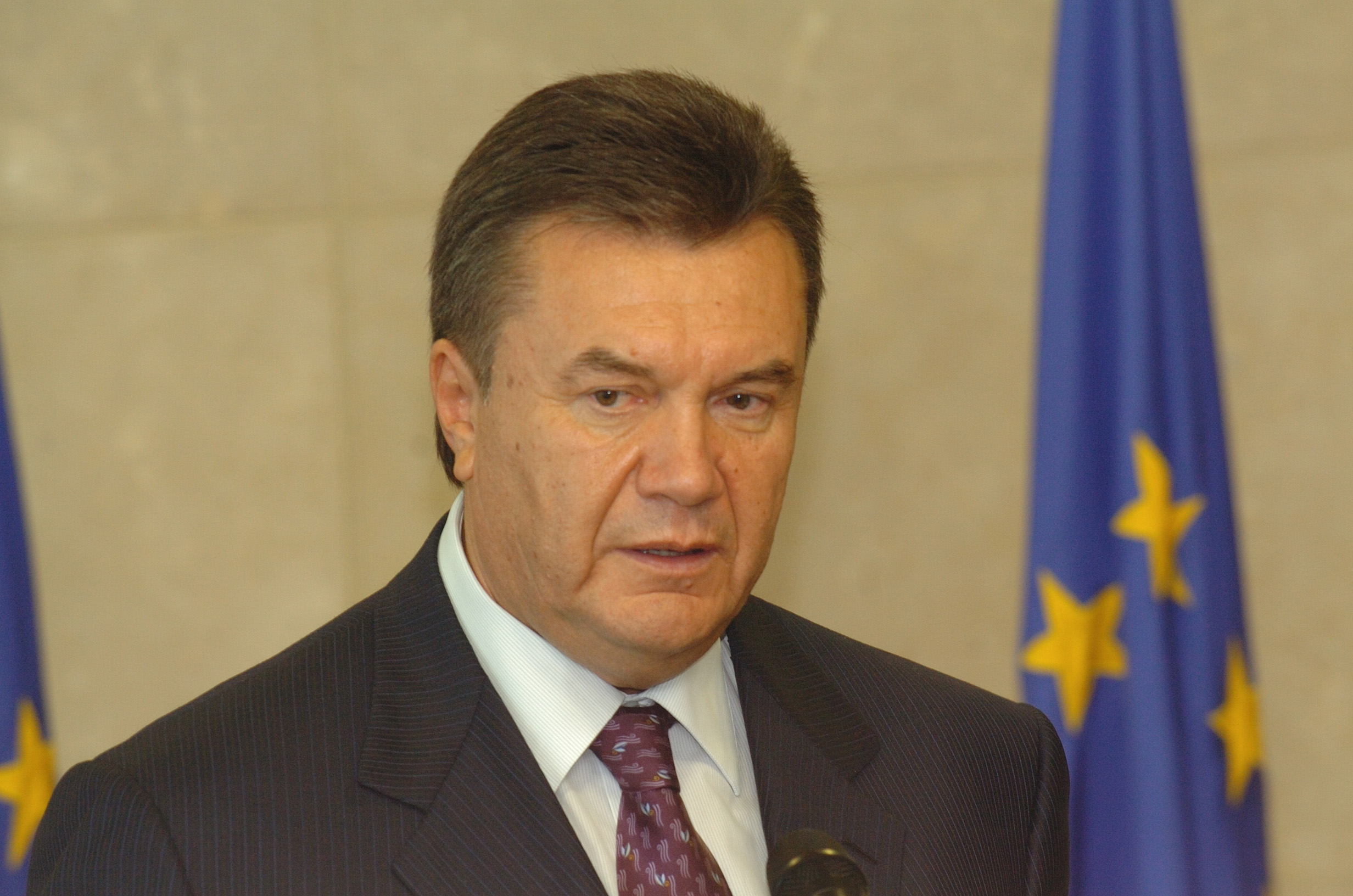
Kravchuk supported Viktor Yanukovych (pictured) in the 2004 presidential election, but later opposed him in 2010

Kravchuk actively supported Viktor Yanukovych during the 2004 presidential election, and did not support the Orange Revolution protests that occurred following the election. During the Orange Revolution, Kravchuk negotiated on behalf of Yanukovych as part of efforts to negotiate a settlement to the protests. As a result of his support for Yanukovych, Kravchuk was stripped of an honorary doctorate from the National University of Kyiv-Mohyla Academy in November 2004.

In the 2006 parliamentary election, Kravchuk again ran for the Verkhovna Rada, this time as leader of the Ne Tak bloc. Ne Tak was an anti-NATO, eurosceptic alliance, including Viktor Medvedchuk (a close associate of Russian President Vladimir Putin and former Chief of Staff of the Presidential Administration under Kuchma), as well as other members of the SDPU(o). The party failed to enter the Verkhovna Rada, receiving less than the 3% of votes required to enter the parliament. Researcher Abel Polese attributes this failure to Ne Tak's competition with the Communist Party of Ukraine and the Progressive Socialist Party of Ukraine over the small far-left electorate; as a result, only the Communist Party successfully entered the Verkhovna Rada. Kravchuk's involvement in Ne Tak would discredit him for the rest of his political career.

On 25 September 2009, Kravchuk declared during an interview with the Day newspaper that he left the SDPU(o), again becoming an independent. Kravchuk cited the SDPU(o)'s membership in the Bloc of Left and Center-left Forces, and the political council's decision to do so being made behind closed doors, as his justification for leaving the party. Kravchuk further expressed indignation at the bloc's existence, saying that the SDPU(o) had "nothing in common at all" with the Communist Party and accusing the SDPU(o)'s leadership of failing to embrace "real European social-democracy".

Kravchuk endorsed Yulia Tymoshenko in the 2010 Ukrainian presidential election. In a March 2010 open letter to Yanukovych, he criticised the latter's policy as authoritarian, saying "Your team has many people who want to continue along the path of lawlessness, permisiveness and corruption. They're developing a taste for solving complex problems by force. This has nothing in common with democracy." This marked a change from his previous opposition to the Orange Revolution, and Motyl saw Kravchuk's discontentment as an indicator of Ukrainian elites' opposition to Yanukovych.

=== War in Donbas ===
In July 2020, Kravchuk was appointed as Ukraine's representative to the Trilateral Contact Group, a body organised to resolve the war in Donbas (post-Minsk agreements ceasefire map pictured)

In July 2020, Kravchuk was chosen to represent Ukraine at the Trilateral Contact Group (formed to facilitate a diplomatic resolution to the war in Donbas), being appointed to replace Leonid Kuchma. In appointing Kravchuk, President Volodymyr Zelenskyy claimed that Kravchuk was respected by "all" Ukrainians, in spite of continued distrust of him due to the economic crisis during his presidency and his leadership of Ne Tak. Aged 86 at the time of his appointment, Kravchuk needed frequent breaks during negotiations, and in one instance, he appeared on Russian television agreeing to hosts' claims that the Russian government was uninvolved in the war, causing a diplomatic embarrassment for the Ukrainian government.

Due to his advanced age, Kravchuk named Vitold Fokin, his former Prime Minister, as top adviser. Fokin and Kravchuk both supported allowing Russian local elections to be held in the Donbas and Russian-occupied Crimea (a measure opposed by the Ukrainian government due to fears it could legitimise the Russian separatist forces that controlled the Donbas), while Fokin further claimed that there was no evidence that Russia was involved in Ukraine and argued for a general amnesty. Fokin was ultimately dismissed from his position as adviser to Kravchuk on 30 September 2020.

Following the 2020–2021 Belarusian protests and the diversion of Ryanair Flight 4978 by the Belarusian government, as a result of which journalist Roman Protasevich was arrested, Kravchuk called on the Trilateral Contact Group to seek an alternative venue to Minsk, where negotiations were being held. He described President of Belarus Alexander Lukashenko as "self-proclaimed" and Belarus as a Russian satellite state as further reasons to move negotiations from Minsk. Kravchuk's proposals were rejected by Russia.

On 27 February 2022, three days after Russia launched a full-scale invasion, Kravchuk released a joint statement alongside former presidents Leonid Kuchma and Viktor Yushchenko that appealed for international support. The message commended Ukrainians, military and civil, for "completely destroy[ing] the age-old myth of the so-called greatness of Russia" and proclaimed Russia would "pay for its crimes".

== Later life and death ==
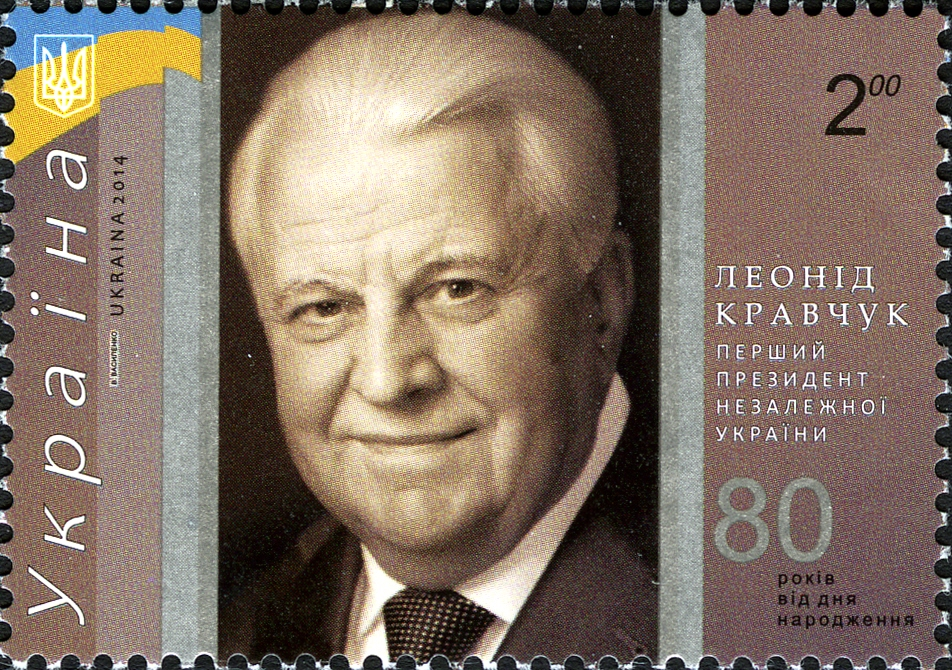
Kravchuk's portrait on a 2014 Ukrainian post stamp

Kravchuk had heart surgery in June 2021, missing celebrations of Constitution Day held on 29 June of that year. On 10 May 2022, a family member told the Ukrainian News Agency that Kravchuk had died at the age of 88, after a long illness. His death was also confirmed by unnamed officials in Kyiv, as well as Andriy Yermak, head of Ukrainian president Volodymyr Zelenskyy's office. Zelenskyy paid tribute to Kravchuk, calling him not just a historical figure but "a man who knew how to find wise words and to say them so that all Ukrainians would hear them." He was the last surviving signatory of the Belovezha Accords, following Yeltsin's 2007 death and a week after the death of Shushkievich.

Kravchuk's funeral took place on 17 May at the Ukrainian House in Kyiv, and was attended by Zelenskyy and First Lady Olena Zelenska as well as three former presidents of Ukraine: Kuchma, Yushchenko and Petro Poroshenko. In addition, guests included his wife Antonina, mayor of Kyiv Vitali Klitschko, Defence Minister Oleksii Reznikov and former politicians Oleksandr Kuzmuk, Oleksandr Moroz and Mustafa Dzhemilev. He was buried at Baikove Cemetery.

== Notes ==
Political offices
Preceded by Stanislav Hurenko	Second Secretary of the Communist Party of Ukraine; 1990	Succeeded by Hryhoriy Kharchenko
Preceded by Vladimir Ivashko	Chairman of Supreme Soviet of Ukrainian SSR / Chairman of Verkhovna Rada of Ukraine; 1990–1991	Succeeded by Ivan Plyushch
Preceded by Office created	President of Ukraine; 1991–1994	Succeeded by Leonid Kuchma
