= List of awards and honours received by Leonid Kravchuk =

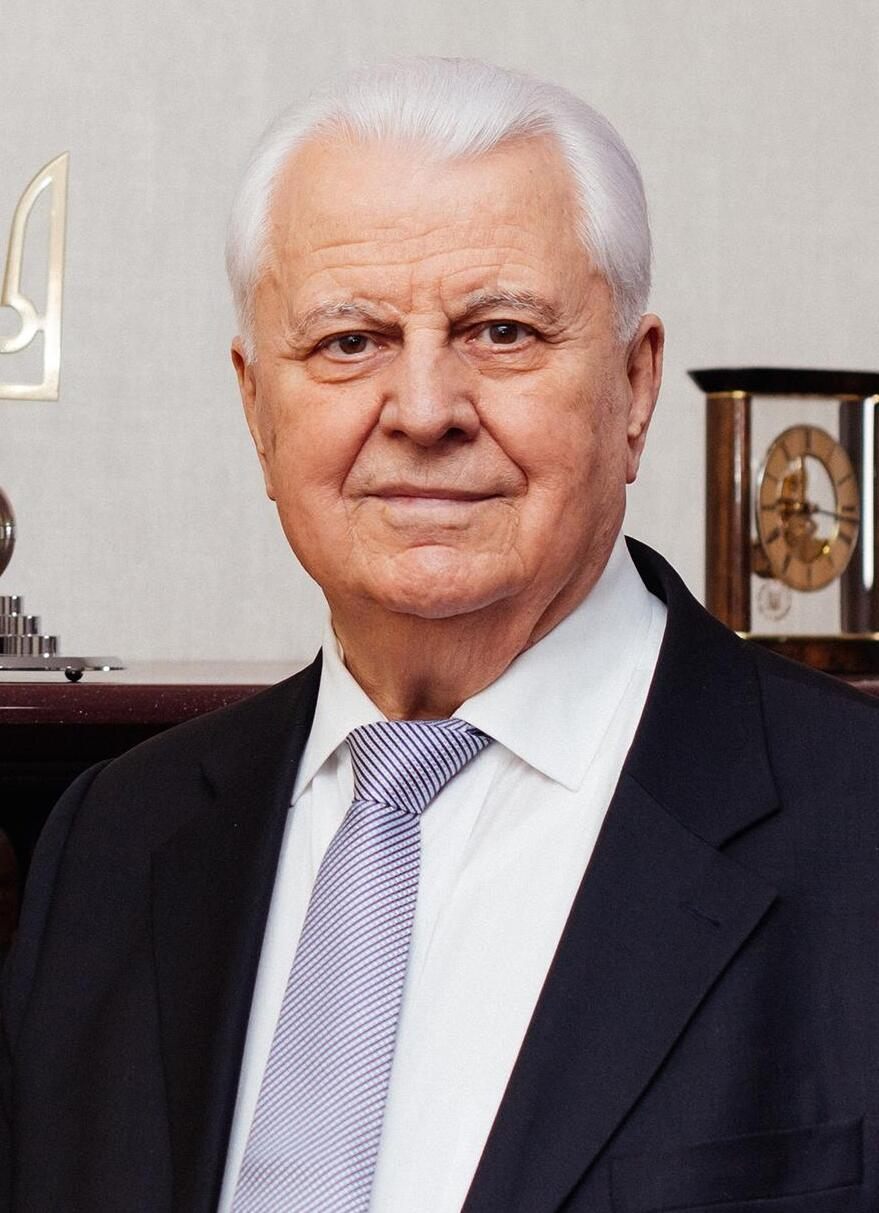
Leonid Kravchuk

Leonid Kravchuk, who served as the first president of Ukraine from 1991 to 1994, was bestowed with multiple awards and honours during his political career.

== Ukraine ==
Decoration	Date	Awarder	Remarks	Ref.
Hero of Ukraine	21 August 2001	Leonid Kuchma (President)		
Honorary Diploma of the Cabinet of Ministers of Ukraine	2004	Government of Ukraine		
Order of Prince Yaroslav the Wise	15 July 2020	Volodymyr Zelenskyy (President)	1st class	
Order of Prince Yaroslav the Wise	9 January 2007	Viktor Yushchenko (President)	2nd class	
Order of Prince Yaroslav the Wise	10 January 2004	Leonid Kuchma (President)	3rd class	
Order of Prince Yaroslav the Wise	10 January 1999	Leonid Kuchma (President)	4th class	
Order of Prince Yaroslav the Wise	21 August 1996	Leonid Kuchma (President)	5th class	
Order of Liberty	10 January 2014	Viktor Yanukovych (President)		
25 years of Ukrainian independence medal	19 August 2016	Petro Poroshenko (President)		

=== Non-state awards ===
- Medal for the Glory of Chernivtsi
- Winner of the Ukrainian Celebrity Awards 2020 in the category "Man of the Year"
- Honorary Doctorate from Taras Shevchenko National University of Kyiv
- Honorary Doctorate from National University of Kyiv-Mohyla Academy (revoked November 2004)

== Soviet Union ==
- Order of the October Revolution
- Order of the Red Banner of Labour, twice
