= Laukkuryssä =

Karelian peddlers in 19th century Finland

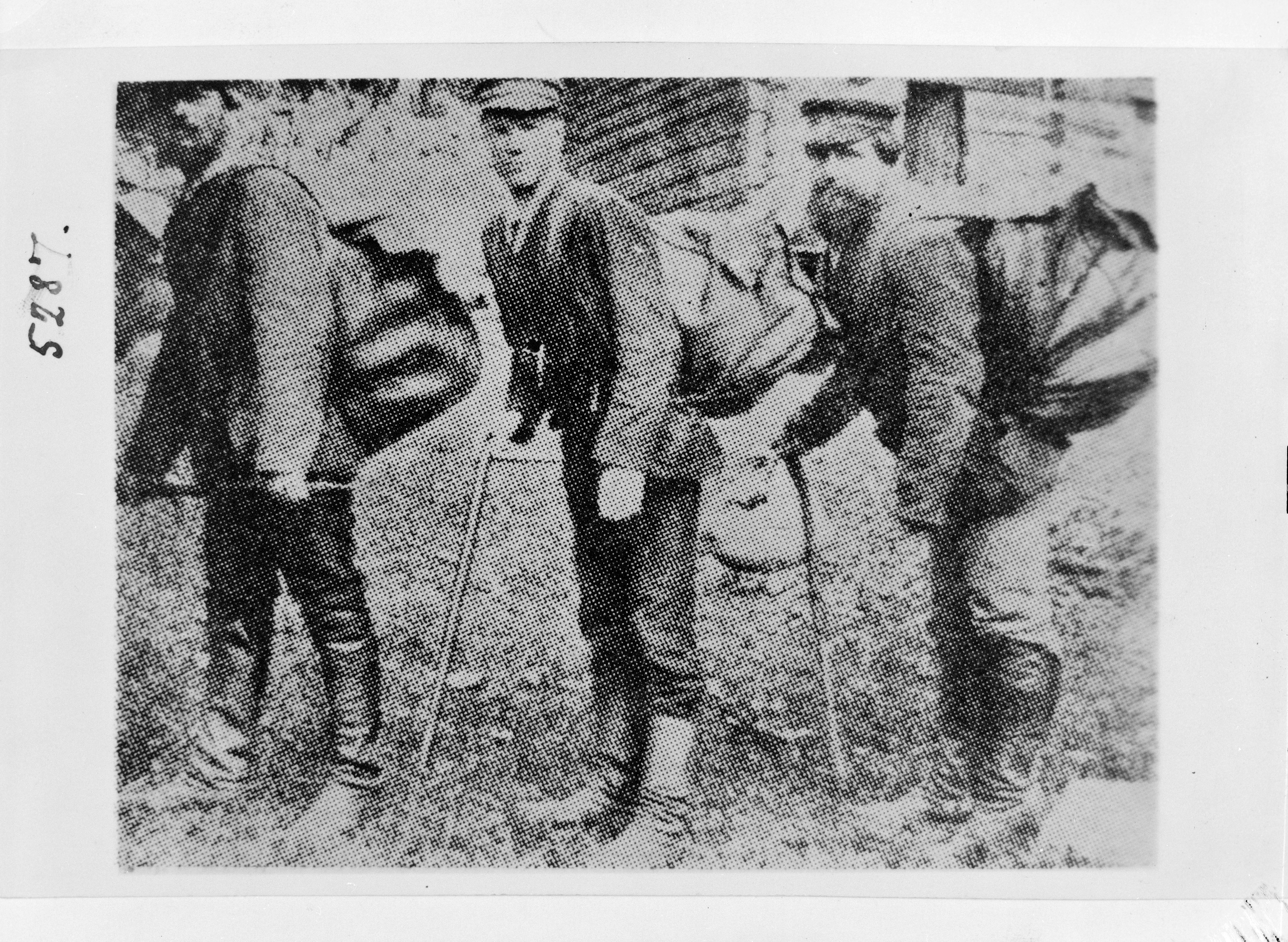
"Laukkuryssä" peddlers from Kiestinki in Lohja.

In Finland, "laukkuryssä" , also reppuryssä (Finnish for "bag Russian", Swedish: påsaryssar) were travelling salesmen who went around Finland and northern Sweden from the middle 19th century to the early 20th century. Despite the name, "laukkuryssäs" were not ethnically Russian, but instead Karelian peasants from East Karelia. Their trade was called a "bag trade", after the large leathern backpacks they carried.

== History ==
The bag trade was most prominent in places along the border, but "laukkuryssäs" also went around in other parts of Finland as well as northern Sweden. The Russian part of Karelia was a very poor and underdeveloped area except for the part under the influence of Saint Petersburg. Inhabitants of the northern part of White Karelia sought extra income by fishing on the shores of the Arctic Ocean, and those living in the south went peddling into the Grand Duchy of Finland. For example in the early 1900s there were over a hundred "laukkuryssäs" going around in Northern Karelia, and in total they numbered several thousand. The "laukkuryssäs" allowed for important material and cultural trade between Finland and Karelia. The richest peddlers could have houses in western Finnish style commissioned on their homelands.

The "laukkuryssä" trade was very organised, as the entire country of Finland had been divided place by place among the peddlers. Peasants went on their way in the autumn after harvest time. They had a rendezvous point established beforehand, from where they went to acquire goods for sale together. The goods mostly included cloths and textiles for women, or small household supplies, that were easy to carry along. As well as the actual "laukkuryssäs" there were also peddlers moving on sleds and horses, carrying much larger selections of goods.

For a long time, the "laukkuryssä" trade was technically illegal, as the 1879 trade decree only allowed subjects of the Grand Duchy of Finland to practice trade in Finland. In practice, this illegality was mostly ignored, although Finnish merchants often pressured officials to curb the illegal trade. The officials sharpened up in winter 1899 as the "laukkuryssäs" were found to spread baseless rumours in the countryside that the February Manifesto would lead to enactment of "Russian law" and a general land reform to the benefit of the steadless people in Finland. Many people suspected that either the Russian government, the hated Governor-General of Finland Nikolay Bobrikov or some other party had organised the peddlers to spread rumours in order to gain support for Russification politics. However, this could not be proven, so the case might have simply been that the peddlers liked to invent news favouring them to be able to receive a better welcome. In any case, this led to Finnish officials starting to arrest "laukkuryssäs" and confiscate their goods appealing to the law, and many Finns started to have a negative opinion of them. Some of them were even physically assaulted.

"Laukkuryssäs" who had returned to their homelands held meetings in Vuokkiniemi, Kivijärvi and Uhtua in May to June 1899 drafting appeals to Governor-General Bobrikov to allow them to practice trade in Finland legally. Bobrikov took this upon himself with enthusiasm, as he did not accept the fact that the Finnish legislature equated Russian citizens with foreigners. By Bobrikov's initiative, the emperor issued the so-called trade decree in July 1900, giving Russians the right to practice trade in Finland and thus legalising the "laukkuryssä" trade.

The peddling trade grew less financially profitable starting from the late 19th century because of establishment of countryside stores. The activity of peddlers coming from Russia ended when Finland became independent and the borders were closed. Karelian peddlers having emigrated to Finland as refugees in the 1920s went around the countryside until World War II. By the start of the 20th century some "laukkuryssäs" started founding proper indoor stores, but peddlers continued to go around the countryside up to the 1950s.

== See also ==
- Ryssä
- Bag people
