= Kotiryssä =

Kotiryssä (jocular, lit. 'one's home Russky' or 'home Russian') was a Finnish term for a Soviet or Russian contact person of a Finnish politician, bureaucrat, businessman or other important person.

The term kotiryssä referred especially to Soviet diplomats or spies stationed in Helsinki in the 1960s and 1970s who were designated by the Soviet government to gather information from specific persons in Finnish politics and government. This system was initiated by Viktor Vladimirov who was stationed in Helsinki repeatedly (1955–1960, 1970–1971, 1977–1984).

As such information gathering techniques have arguably always been prevalent among spies, some Finns have argued that the kotiryssä system was a normal way to conduct diplomatic relations between two countries. The dozens of KGB officers working out of the Tehtaankatu embassy of the Soviet Union as diplomats is now well documented. The public did not know about the system until the book Tamminiemen pesänjakajat was published in 1981. The kotiryssä system was closely related to Finlandization.

Finnish politician Erkki Tuomioja recalled that Finnish politicians themselves sought for their own kotiryssä to establish contacts with Moscow..

In 2015 Helsingin Sanomat wrote that the kotiryssä practise had all but ceased to exist. The Russian diplomatic corps in Helsinki no longer maintains contacts with the Finnish politicians and journalists.

Earlier in time, during World War II, the word kotiryssä also referred to Russian émigrés in Finland or people who could speak Russian in general. The word is not neutral but jocular language.

== Examples ==
- Viktor Vladimirov — KGB officer for elite Finnish politicians, including Urho Kekkonen.
- Felix Karasev — KGB officer who arrived in April 1985 to replace Vladimirov.
- Vladimir Stepanov — KGB officer and later Soviet Ambassador to Finland.
- Sergei Ivanov — KGB officer for six years in Finland in the 1980s, following alleged deportation from the UK. He worked directly under Karasev. Later a top member of the Russian government.

== See also ==
- Finlandization
- Ryssä, a Finnish term for a Russian person, considered derogatory today
- Finland–Russia relations
