= Viktor Vladimirov =

Soviet Lieutenant general, diplomat and KGB officer

Viktor Vladimirov was a Soviet Lieutenant general, diplomat, and KGB officer operating in Finland.

He was the head of the KGB assassination and sabotage section, the 13th Department in the 1960s. It is believed that Vladimirov was involved in a failed KGB operation to murder former KGB officer Anatoliy Golitsyn in Canada who had defected from Finland to the United States.

He served in the Soviet embassy in Finland in the 1950s, 1970s, and 1980s. He was the top "kotiryssä" ("home Russian") in Finland. Following the dissolution of the Soviet Union in 1991, he published his memoir "Näin se oli" in 1993. Vladimirov died in 1995.

== Sources ==
- Näin se oli...: Muistelmia ja havaintoja kulissientakaisesta diplomaattitoiminnasta Suomessa 1954–1984., Viktor Vladimirov, 1993, Otava, Helsinki

== See also ==
- Finlandization
