= Ryssä =

Pejorative Finnish term for a Russian person

Ryssä (Finnish pronunciation: [ˈrysːæ]) is a Finnish term for a Russian person, considered derogatory today. The term is also used as a collective term for Russians or Russia, and may refer to the Russian language. The neutral word for "Russian person" in modern Finnish is venäläinen, from Venäjä for "Russia".

The term ryssä has also been used for other, non-Russian nationalities within Russia or the Soviet Union. Compound words reppuryssä and laukkuryssä refer to East Karelian peddlers who traded in Finland until the early 20th century. The term pikkuryssä ("little Russian") was used to refer to the tropak dance (from the term "Little Russians" for Ukrainians; the dance is now called ripaska in Finnish).

== Etymology ==
The Finnish word ryssä comes from the Swedish word ryss, meaning a Russian person. Similar words are used in many other languages: Russian in English, русский (russkiy) in Russian, russe in French, and so on. The same etymology is shared by the words for the country of Russia in most languages, such as Россия (Rossiya) in Russian, Ryssland in Swedish and Russia in English. Thus the words in these languages do not have a derogatory connotation like the Finnish word ryssä has.

These words come from the Viking Age Rus' people, which in turn apparently comes from the ancient Swedish word rodhmenn ("rowing men", "Vikings on the route from the Varangians to the Greeks"), via the Finnic languages. The Finnic word for the "rowing people" still survives in the Finnish and Estonian names for the country of Sweden, Ruotsi and Rootsi respectively.

== Use of the term ==
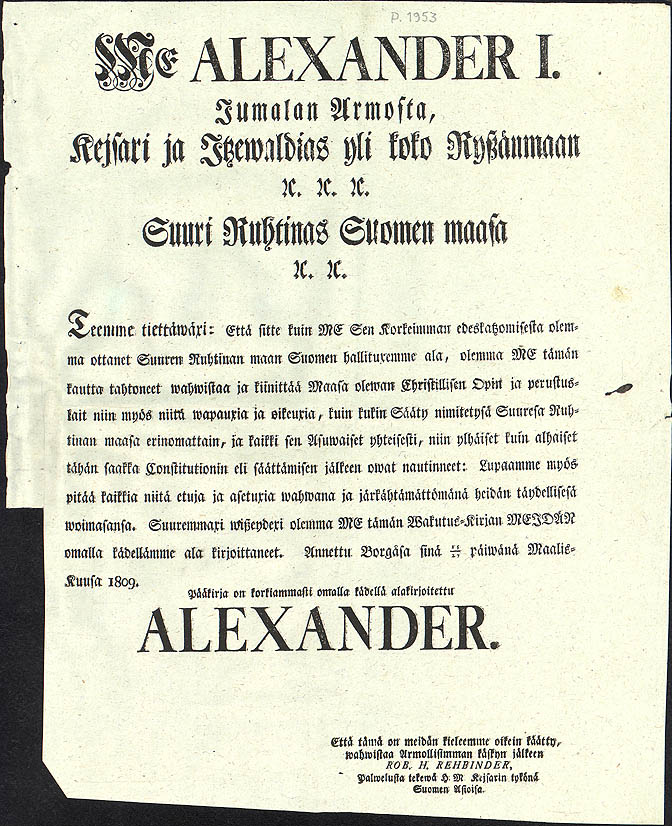
Finnish translation of Alexander I's speech. The title reads "WE ALEXANDER I, by the Grace of God, Emperor and Autocrat over all Russia".

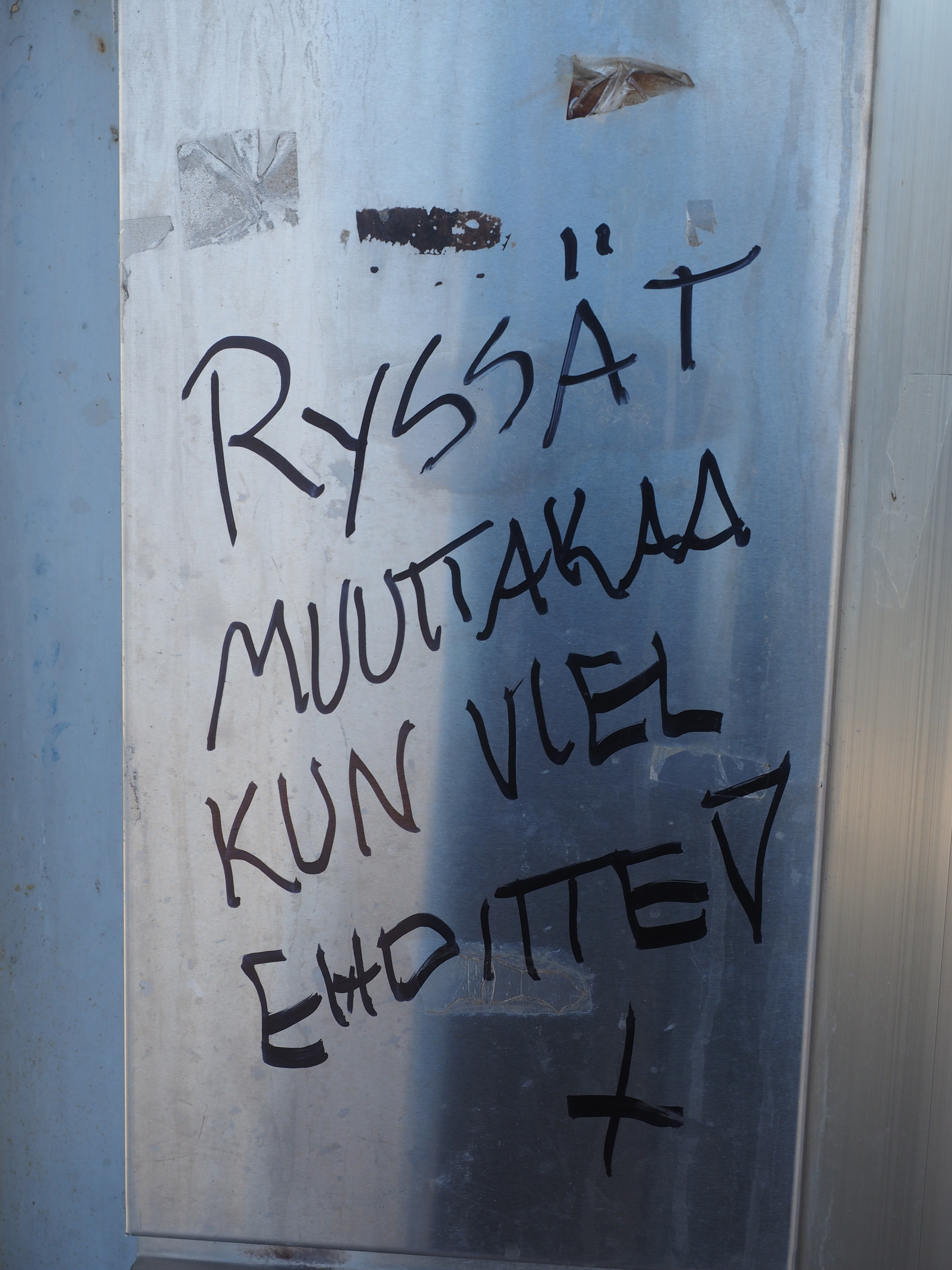
"Ryssä" used as a derogatory term in graffiti in Vantaa, Finland. The text reads "Russians, move away from here while you still can".

According to modern understanding, the derogatory use of the term in Finland started in the early times of Finnish independence. Before this time it had been used as a neutral ethnonym. For example, the term was in wide use in the Grand Duchy of Finland. The translation used at the time for the speech emperor Alexander I of Russia gave at the Diet of Porvoo in 1809 in French starts:

"ME ALEXANDER I. Jumalan Armosta, Keisari ja Itsevaltias yli koko Ryssänmaan"
("WE ALEXANDER I, by the Grace of God, Emperor and Autocrat over all Russia")

Use of the term "ryssä" in Finland is today considered derogatory towards Russians. A study published by Satu Tervonen in 2000 studied the connotations of appellations related to ethnicity or other human background. 199 people of 15 to 80 years living in the capital region took part in the study. Participants were asked to estimate the connotation of a person calling another a "ryssä" during an argument in a grocery store queue in the scale of "very derogatory", "derogatory", "somewhat harmless", "neutral" or "strange". Of the participants, 92% thought "ryssä" was at least a derogatory term, while the respective amounts for "neekeri" ("negro") and "manne" ("gypsy") were 90% and 88%, respectively. In general, female participants thought the terms were slightly more derogatory than male participants did.

As well as Russians themselves, the term "ryssä" is occasionally used for other nationalities having a historical connection to Russia or the Soviet Union. These nationalities include for example the Ukrainians, Belarusians, Estonians, Ingrian Finns and Karelians. The term "ryssä" has also been used in a derogatory fashion for the Finnish Karelian evacuatees.

== See also ==
- Chukhna, a Russian term for Finns and other Balto-Finnic peoples
- Kotiryssä, a Finnish term for a Soviet or Russian contact person of an important Finnish person
- Finland–Russia relations
