= Volodymyr Mukhin =

Ukrainian physicist and politician

- Володимир Мухін; Владимир Мухин
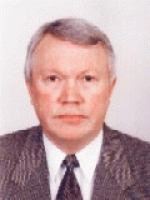
- Official portrait, 2002

People's Deputy of Ukraine
- In office 11 May 1994 – 25 May 2006
- Preceded by: Henrikh Altunian (1994)
- Succeeded by: Constituency abolished
- Constituency: Kharkiv Oblast, Kyivskyi District (1994–1998); SPU, No. 29 (1998–2002); SPU, No. 23 (2002–2006)

Personal details
- Born: 28 June 1949 (age 77) Staryi Krym, Crimean Oblast, Russian SFSR, Soviet Union
- Party: Socialist
- Other political affiliations: Socialist Party – Peasant Party (1998)
- Education: Kharkiv State University (DF-MN)

Volodymyr Vasyliovych Mukhin (Ukrainian: Володимир Васильович Мухін, Russian: Владимир Васильевич Мухин, romanized: Vladimir Vasilyevich Mukhin; born 28 June 1949) is a Ukrainian physicist and politician who served as a People's Deputy of Ukraine from the Socialist Party of Ukraine between 1994 and 2006.

== Early life and academic career ==
Volodymyr Vasyliovych Mukhin was born on 28 June 1949 to an ethnically-Russian family in the city of Staryi Krym, then part of the Russian Soviet Federative Socialist Republic's Crimean Oblast. He studied physics at Kharkiv State University from 1966 to 1970, and from 1971 to 1993 worked as a researcher at the Kharkiv Institute of Physics and Technology. Mukhin became a Doctor of Physics and Mathematical Sciences in 1990 and was given the title of professor in 1994.

Mukhin was awarded the Lenin Komsomol Prize in 1981. As a researcher, Mukhin's work primarily focused on nuclear fusion, plasma and acceleration.

== Political career ==
In the 1994 Ukrainian parliamentary election, Mukhin was a candidate in Kharkiv's Kyivskyi District for the Socialist Party of Ukraine. He was successfully elected, taking office on 11 May 1994. After his election, Mukhin was appointed chairman of the Verkhovna Rada Defence and Security Committee. In this position, Mukhin opposed President Leonid Kravchuk's policy of providing support to NATO in the Yugoslav Wars.

Mukhin was re-elected in the 1998 Ukrainian parliamentary election, this time as the 29th candidate on the electoral list of the Socialist Party – Peasant Party alliance. He returned to the Defence and Security Committee as deputy chairman. Upon the alliance's dissolution, Mukhin sat in the Verkhovna Rada as a member of the Socialist Party. In the 2002 Ukrainian parliamentary election he was elected as the 23rd candidate on the list of the Socialist Party; he served as a member of the Industrial Policy and Enterprise Committee.

Mukhin ran for a fourth term in the 2006 Ukrainian parliamentary election as the 48th candidate on the Socialist Party's list. He was not elected.
