= Bag people =

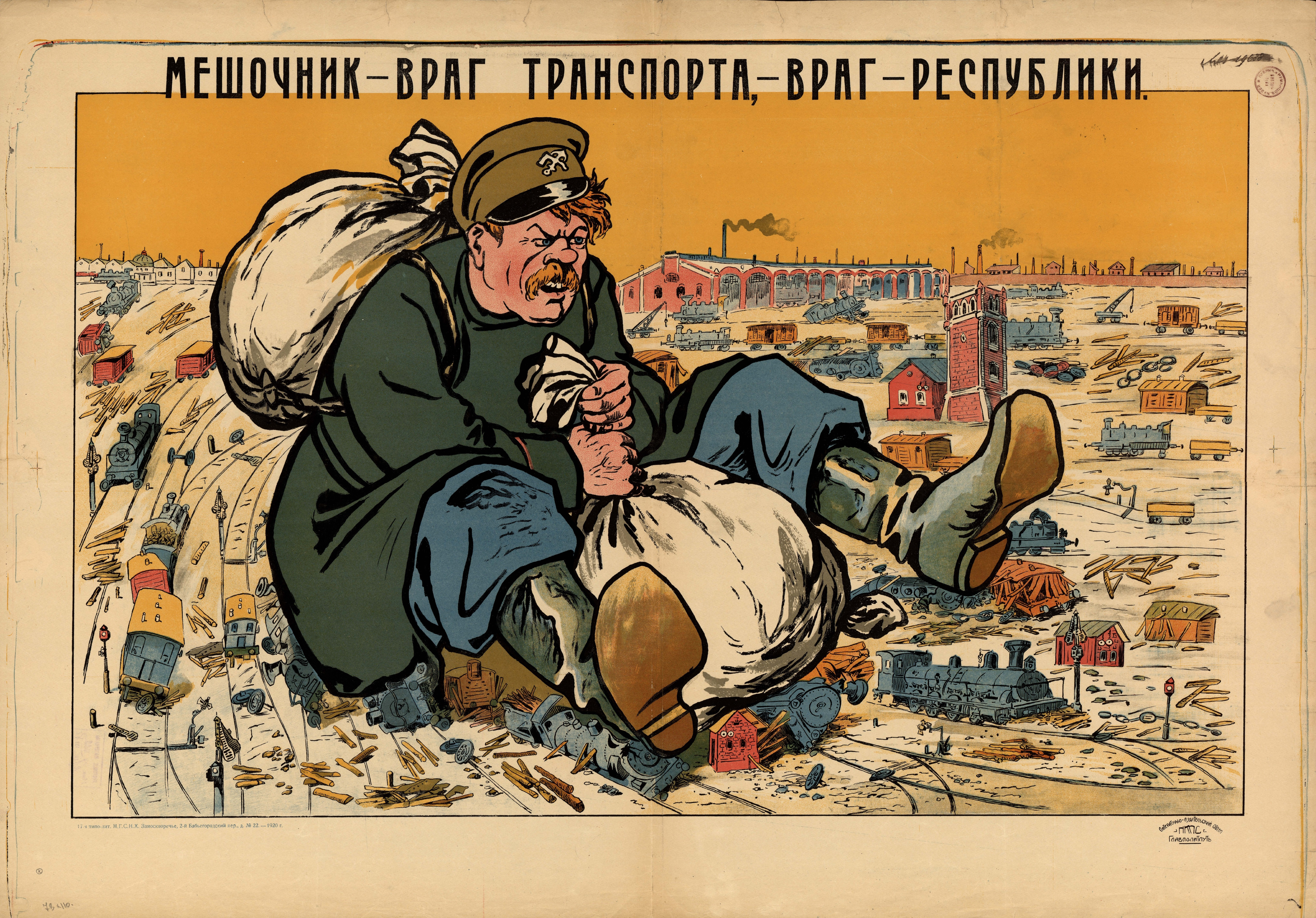
Soviet poster "Meshochnik is an enemy of transport, enemy of the republic", 1920

Bag people (Russian: мешочники, meshochniks, or "people with bags") is a term in Russian and other Slavic languages that refers to people, who trade for personal use or for profit, recognizable by their large sacks.

Some of them were people from the cities travelling to the countryside to buy food for small scale trade or for personal consumption, often exchanging it for material goods from farmers due to collapse of the monetary system. Others were people from the countryside doing the opposite trade.

Historically, the bag people have appeared in response to economic and political collapse that ended organized delivery and distribution of food in the cities. The phenomenon was very widespread during and soon after the Russian Revolution. It also flourished throughout Eastern Europe and Germany after the devastation of World War I. With the devastation of the economy during the Russian Civil War and the period of war communism with its policy of prodrazvyorstka (food requisition by state), meshochniks from countryside were seen as profiteers and persecuted by the Cheka.

The meshochnik phenomenon was revived on a different scale in the Soviet Union in the end of the 1980s. With the lifting of the abroad travel restrictions in the Soviet Union, Soviet people traveled abroad to exchange cheaply purchased Soviet goods for goods scarcely produced or altogether absent in Soviet Union (and post-Soviet states). They have become known as "shuttle traders". The business of shuttle trade continued well beyond the collapse of the Soviet Union.

In literature, bag people are mentioned, for example, in Remarque's The Road Back and Karel Čapek's The Absolute at Large.

== See also ==
- Shuttle traders
- Laukkuryssä
