= Shuttle trade =

Resellers during the collapse of the Soviet Union

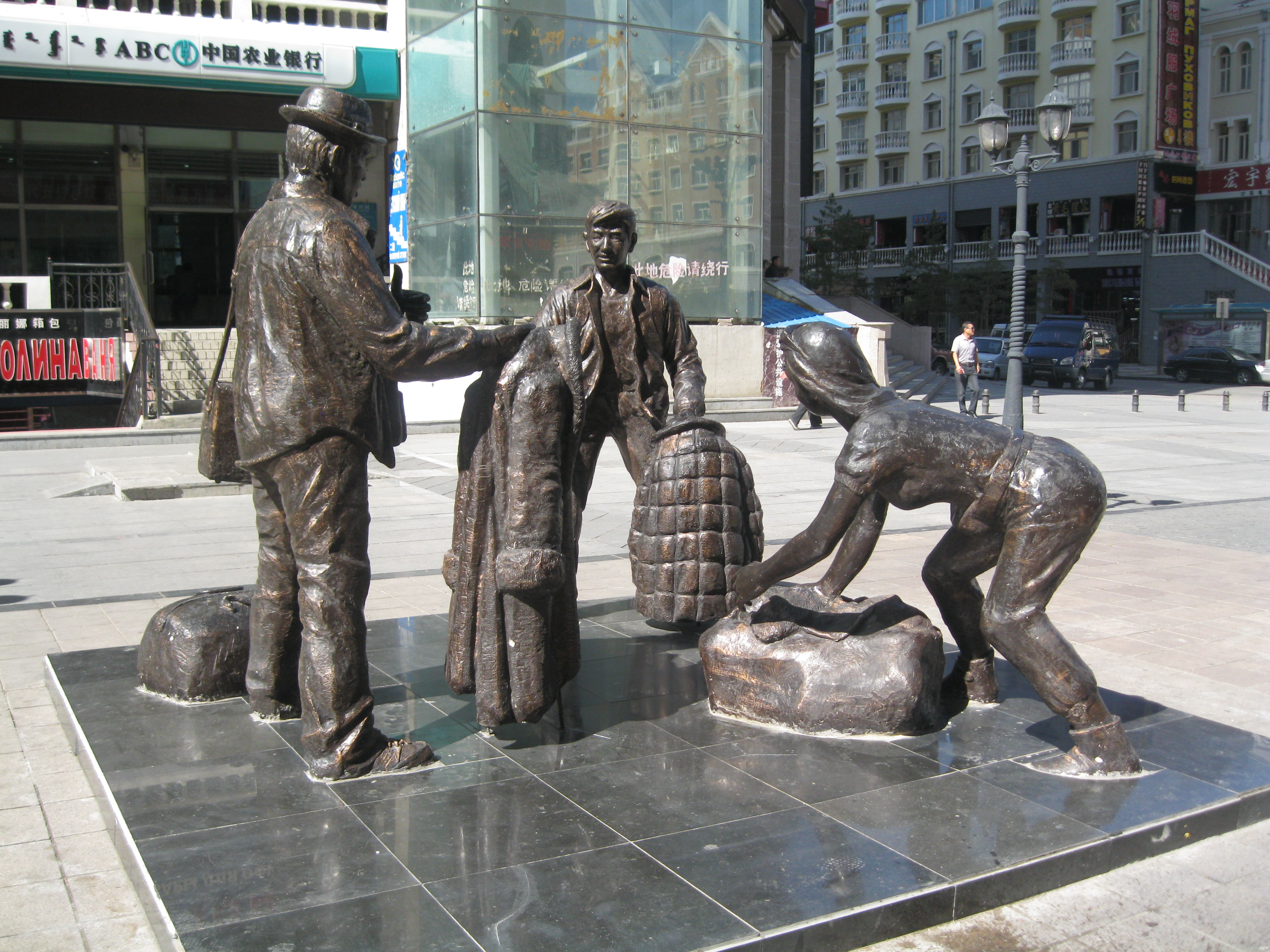
A monument to shuttle traders in China

According to the OECD definition, shuttle trade is "the activity in which individual entrepreneurs buy goods abroad and import them for resale in street markets or small shops. Often the goods are imported without full declaration in order to avoid import duties."

== History ==
Shuttle traders (Russian: челноки, romanized: chelnoki, lit. 'shuttles'; Ukrainian: човники, romanized: chovniki) were people engaged in the practice of shuttle trade in the late Soviet Union and post-soviet states in which traders shuttled in and out of the country, buying goods and then selling them within the country. Originated during the perestroika times, it extended well beyond the collapse of the Soviet Union in Russia, as well as in many other post-Soviet states.

Shuttlers may carry goods for sale in both directions, and it is often contraband, based on loopholes in import laws. Often shuttlers are victims of robbery, because they are easily identifiable. Still, the business is attractive. For example, in 2007 it was reported that a St. Petersburg-Finland shuttler earns 400-600 Euros per trip on average.

In Turkey the practice of shuttle trading is known as "suitcase trade" (Turkish: bavul ticareti) since the 1960s when goods for sale were brought from Northern Cyprus in suitcases.

== See also ==
- Bag people
