= Victoria Museum =

Victoria Museum may refer to:

- Victoria and Albert Museum, a museum in London, England
- Queen Victoria Museum (disambiguation), multiple museums
- Museum Victoria, a museum in Melbourne, Australia
- Tramway Museum Society of Victoria
- Victoria Jubilee Museum, Vijayawada, India
- Canadian Museum of Nature in Ottawa, Canada, formerly named the Victoria Museum
- Victoria Museum in Kyiv, Ukraine, a museum of historical costume and style of the Victorian era.
