= Vyacheslav Lysenko =

- Born: October 12, 1970; 55 years ago Cherkasy, Ukraine
- Education: International Institute of Management; National Technical University of Ukraine's "Igor Sikorsky Kyiv Polytechnic Institute"; Cherkasy State Technological University
- Occupations: Public figure; Businessman
- Known for: co-owner of Meest China
- Spouse: Victoria Lysenko

Vyacheslav Viktorovich Lysenko (born October 12, 1970, in Cherkasy, Ukraine) is a Ukrainian businessman, public figure, co-owner of Meest China, and an expert on Ukrainian-Chinese relations. He was the USSR champion of the open water swimming competition in 1989.

== Early life and education ==
Vyacheslav was born on October 12, 1970, in Cherkasy. He was a professional swimmer; in 1989, Vyacheslav Lysenko became the USSR champion of the open water multisport swimming competition. From 1989 to 1992, he worked as a swimming coach.

In 1990, Lysenko graduated from the Sevastopol Higher Naval Institute of Nakhimov; in 1992, he graduated from the Cherkasy State Technological University's, International Institute of Management, and, the National Technical University of Ukraine's "Igor Sikorsky Kyiv Polytechnic Institute".

== Career as entrepreneur ==
In the 1990s, Vyacheslav Lysenko did everything that could make money. In 2000, he ended up in Kyiv, as his partners in his native Cherkasy cheated him to zero.

In the early 2000s, he became CEO of an enterprise for the wholesale of building materials. A year later, he became a shareholder in this business.

In 2004 he founded the company "Ukr-China Communication". Prior to the full-scale Russian invasion of Ukraine, he served as its honorary president. The company mediated between Ukrainian and Chinese businesses, helping Ukrainian entrepreneurs to enter the Chinese market. Simultaneously, in 2018, he created the "SLAVINVEST" project to help young entrepreneurs launch complex business processes and crisis management programs.

The largest Ukrainian logistics company "Ukr-China Communication" was established by Vyacheslav Lysenko in 2005 and developed as a bridge connecting businessmen of Ukraine and China.

Since 2011, Vyacheslav Lysenko was a co-founder of the largest business clubs in Ukraine: CEO Club, Young Business Club, Club 100.

In 2017, he founded the company Meest China and Ukr-China Logistics, which, as of 2020, occupies the leading position in the market for the delivery of goods from China to Ukraine. Currently, Meest China is a separate company that is part of Meest Group companies' general system. The company has its own representative office in key industrial regions of the PRC (Beijing and Guangzhou) with full-time Kyiv employees. According to experts, 75–90% of cargo connected with the Ukraine-China route pass through Vyacheslav Lysenko's company.

Besides, in 2017, Vyacheslav founded the "Young Business Club", the largest Ukrainian business club for young people. He also became a member of the supervisory board of "CEO Club Ukraine", which unites top officials of companies in various fields with a minimum turnover of $15 million, and from different business areas, views, gender and age.

== Social activity ==
In 2005, Vyacheslav Lysenko founded The "Ukr-China Communication" magazine. The "Ukr-China Communication" journal was the first and sole professional business publication on mutual relations between Ukraine and China. Journal was published until 2013.

In 2008, he was a member of the Board of the Ukrainian Association of Sinologists.

In 2017, he founded the Young Business Club for young entrepreneurs.

In 2018, Vyacheslav Lysenko also criticized the Ministry of Finance's initiative to introduce a norm on reducing the tax-free limit for parcels from 150 euros to 22 euros. He claimed that such a rule could negatively affect online commerce, government revenue and customers.

Being a co-investor in the "BUSINESS 100" club, he and other club participants supported the Anti-Kolomoisky law.

During the COVID-19 pandemic, together with other businessmen, he took part in creating the "Dyshi" ("Breath") charity foundation. Companies whose leaders are part of the CEO club founded by Vyacheslav Lysenko and other entrepreneurs allocated ₴155 million to fight COVID-19.

In May 2020, Lysenko took part in the international conference PALE-2020 ("POST-APOCALYPTIC LIFE ERA CONFERENCE"). While attending, he spoke as a business representative and shared his thesis on integrating science into business.

Today Vyacheslav Lysenko is an active participant in conferences dedicated to business development and Ukraine-China relations. He actively spreads his views on the prospects for mutual growth with China, and various finances sporting events and federations.

Today, Vyacheslav Lysenko is actively promoting Chinese traditions and the Chinese approach to doing business in Ukraine.

== Family ==
Vyacheslav is married and has two children. His wife Victoria Lysenko is the founder and director of the Victoria Museum.

== Sources ==
- Meest China
- Ukr-China Communication
