= Open International University of Human Development "Ukraine" =

Project university in Kyiv, Ukraine

Coordinates: 50°27′14″N 30°22′11″E

- Відкритий міжнародний університет розвитку людини "Україна"
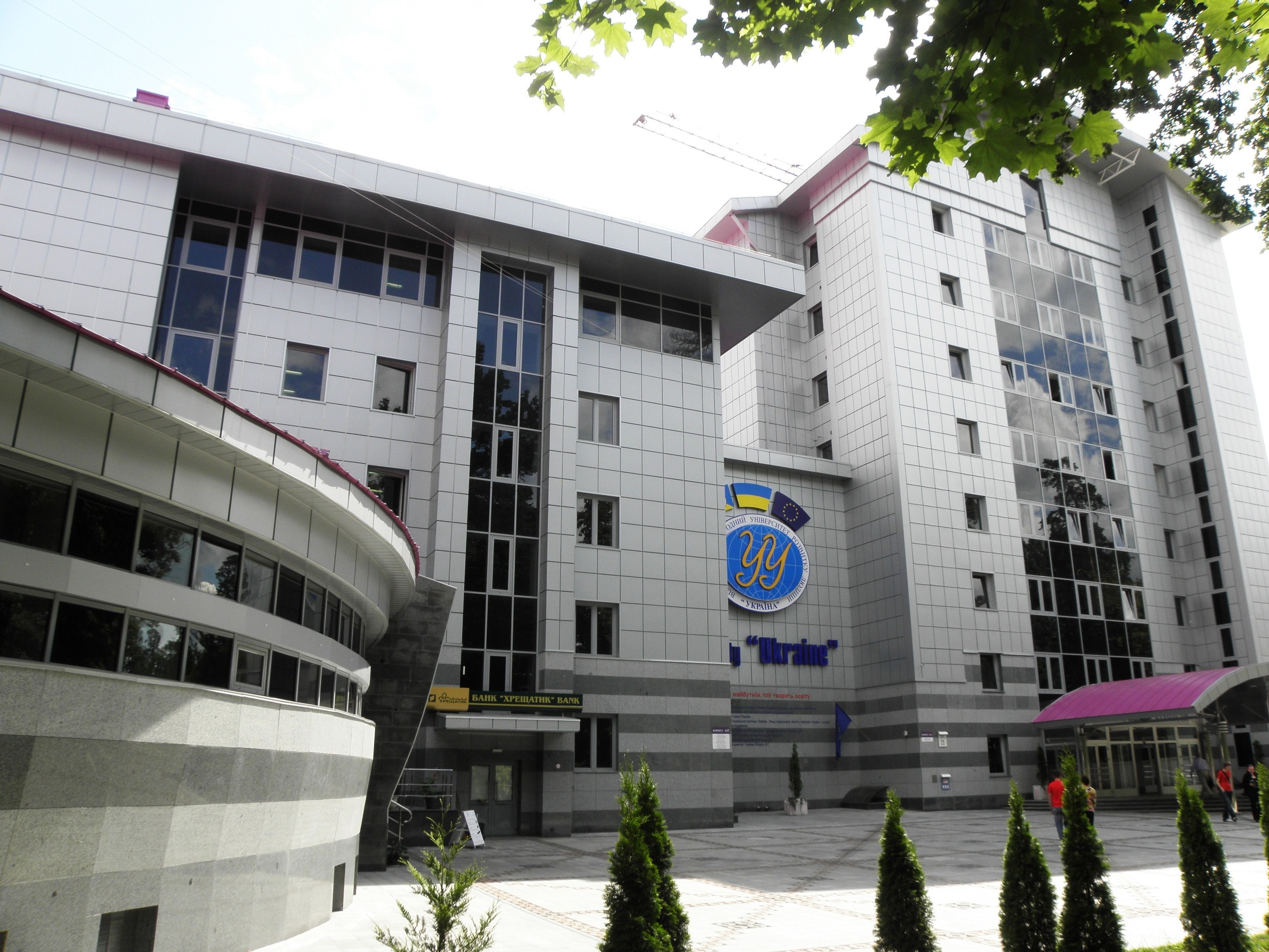
- Type: non-state
- Established: 18 February 1999
- Rector: Petro M. Talanchuk
- Students: 16,060
- Location: 23 Lvivska Street Kyiv 03115 (campus), Kyiv, Ukraine
- Website: vmurolen.uu.edu.ua

Open International University of Human Development "Ukraine" is non-profit, non-state higher education institution, established in 1998.

Peter M. Talanchuk - President of university "Ukraine", honored Scientist and Technician of Ukraine, Doctor of Technical Sciences, Professor, member of the Academy of Pedagogical Sciences of Ukraine, the initiator and president of the Academy of Engineering Sciences of Ukraine, member of four international academies, honorary rector of the National Technical University of Ukraine "Kyiv Polytechnic Institute", the first Minister of Education of independent Ukraine.

== History ==
=== Establishment and development ===
The Open International University of Human Development "Ukraine" was decided to be established at the first meeting of founders on June 30, 1998. Kyiv City State Administration, the Ukrainian Union of Disabled, International Foundation for Human Development, Ukrainian Association of the Deaf, the International Foundation for Disabled Chernobyl and other entities and individuals were among the founders. By July 12, 1999, an Admission Board had started its work and 1616 first-year students were enrolled. The first branches of the university were opened in 20 cities throughout Ukraine that year.

In 2000 next two branches were established and the students were enrolled to 28 specialties. The total number of university students was around 6,000.

In 2001 the university "Ukraine" affiliates with 12,000 students' enrollment in 24 cities of the country, in all administrative regions.

In 2002 the Institute of Generations Harmony for advanced people adaptation to the reality was organized in Kyiv. Students were being trained on 30 licensed specialties. And also a few were being prepared to be licensed. 22 branches and 2 academic consultation centers had been fully functioned. Over 17 thousand students were studying there and 1.5 thousand students with disabilities among them.

During 2003–2004, new branches and academic consultation centers (ACC) were opened. Geographically separated affiliates of the university continued to develop and the most powerful ones reorganized into institutions. The students were admitted on 47 specialties and different qualification levels. Nearly 25 thousand students study were studying at the university.

Providing educational services by distance learning methods was an educational experiment and a milestone of the university development. Innovation method was approved by the joint Order of The Ministry of Education and Science of Ukraine and The Academy of Pedagogical Sciences of Ukraine. Thus, implementing the European standard education technology, university "Ukraine" offers education to persons with disabilities.

On February 24, 2004, the first local center of distance learning was established in the town of Polonne, Khmelnytsky region. Subsequently 16 regional centers of distance learning and over 300 local centers were established. As of July 1, 2004 nearly 33 000 students had been training on 50 different specialties of different qualification levels and 1514 persons of them by means distance learning.

April 19, 2005 the university "Ukraine" got the Шrd-IVth accreditation level. A new building of the university "Ukraine" was commissioned in 23 Lvivska Street in Kyiv. Three Departments (Economics and Management, Biomedical and Computer Technology) were located in it. "Universitet Ukraina" Publishing House began to function.

In 2007 University got the overall IV level of accreditation.

In 2008 the next building was commissioned and Department of Engineering Technologies and the Institute of Automobile Service.

During 2009-2010 the training and science units of the university were under a considerable consideration in order to bring their status according to the requirements of the current legislation of Ukraine. Five Departments were reorganized into institutes in Kyiv.

Now six institutes and one department compile 38 chairs. Students are trained for Bachelor, Specialist and master's degrees. Multi-disciplinary Osvita College trains junior specialists. Set into operation the Recreation Complex "Petrivs'ka Sloboda" (Mizhgir'ya region, Trans-Carpathians Mountains) always invites the students and faculty to rest. A modern student dining room was built and is functioning. The campus of the university "Ukraine" is becoming an adornment of the western part of Kyiv.

== Achievements ==
During its short history the university took a nationwide and worldwide recognition. According to the independent survey rating of higher education institutions of Ukraine being held in 2005, the university "Ukraine" took third place among 110 Ukrainian non-state universities.

After signing an agreement with the Japanese "Stars of Peace" NGO in 2006, university "Ukraine" was the first university in the world to be honored with a great University of Peace title for its high mission.

University "Ukraine" is considered to be a center of sports development, volunteer and scout youth movements. University has been awarded for his significant contribution to preventing HIV / AIDS in Ukraine. University has been noticed many times by the Kyiv city Center of Social Services for Families, Children and Youth, UNICEF, the National Scout Organization of Ukraine and others for taking systematic steps for improving the health and promoting sports activities among students. University initiated a new trend in sports movement of students with disabilities.

University President Petro M. Talanchuk is recognized by the world scientific circles. On January 6, 2003, Petro Talanchuk was elected as an Honorary Member of World Innovation Foundation (USA). The Foundation was established by the Economic Prosperity Institute in 1992 and its president Dr. Jerome Karl is a Nobel Laureate. In 2004 Petro Talanchuk was named the International Socrates Prize-winner established by Europe Business Assembly International Corporation of Social Partnership, a vanity award. The President of the university "Ukraine" is an Honorary Member of the Ukrainian Engineers' Society in America.

== Structure of the University "Ukraine" ==
The academic process is carried out in seven units in Kyiv:

- The Institute of Law and Social Relations
- The Institute of Economics and Management
- The Institute of Philology and Mass Communications
- The Engineering and Technology Institute
- The Institute of Social Technologies
- The Institute of Computer Technologies
- The Faculty of Biomedical technologies

The university has 20 geographically separated affiliates (13 institutes, 3 branches and 4 colleges):

1. Bilotserkivska Institute of Economics and Management,
2. Vinnytsia Social and Economic Institute,
3. Gorlovsky Regional Institute,
4. Dnepropetrovsk Branch,
5. Dubens'ka Branch,
6. Zhytomyr Economic- Humanities Institute,
7. Ivano-Frankivsk branch
8. the Carpathian Institute of Entrepreneurship (Khust),
9. Central Ukrainian Institute of Human Development,
10. Lutsk Institute of Human Development,
11. Melitopol Institute of Ecology and Social Technologies,
12. Mykolaiv Interregional Institute of Human Development,
13. Novokakhovka Humanities Institute,
14. Poltava Institute of Economics and Law,
15. Institute of Rivne,
16. Khmelnytsky Institute of Social Technologies,
17. Pridneprovsky Humanities and Economic College (Nikopol),
18. Storozhynetz College,
19. Ternopil College,
20. College "Osvita" (Kyiv).

== Facilities ==
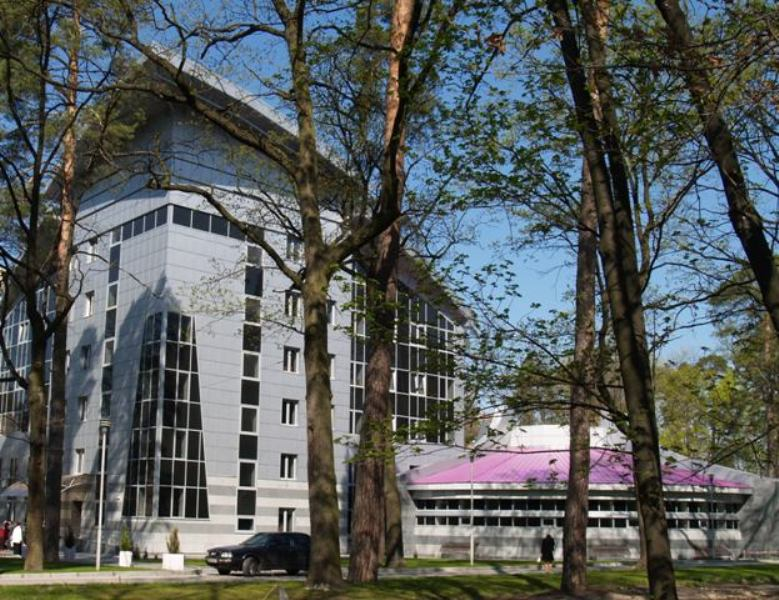
A new building of the university "Ukraine"

Today University "Ukraine" is in comfortable buildings, well-equipped libraries, computer rooms, language laboratories, sports grounds, halls and rehabilitation centers in 20 cities. In Kyiv "Talan-studio" audio-video studio, "Universytet Ukraina" Publishing House, modern dining room and hostels are available for student study and activity. They have an opportunity to rest in the Recreation Complex "Petrivska Sloboda" in the Carpathian region or in the recreation centers in the Crimea and Volyn region. Year after year the facilities of university "Ukraine" are updated.

== Science and international relations ==
The international cooperation of university "Ukraine" is ramified and integrated in European research and education process.

The priority of the university is the elaboration of educational technologies and simultaneous social, educational, psychological and physical rehabilitation of students with special needs. In this field the university takes a positive experience of foreign colleagues including educators from the U.S.A. Because the US as well as all developed European countries has been deeply involved in addressing to the people with special needs for a long time. Particularly in matters of equal opportunities for education of healthy and disabled, rich and poor, educators of the university "Ukraine" see the meaning of international cooperation with foreign colleagues.

Collaboration of university Professors with Professor S. Raver-Lampman (Fulbright Program, USA) can be considered fruitful to improve the pedagogical support students with disabilities. With her help several meetings with the U.S. Embassy representatives in Ukraine were organized that promoted to get a grant for the project "Education in human rights perspective: improving the employability of university students with disabilities " of the Democracy Fund of the U.S. Embassy in Ukraine. The realization of this extra important social project promoted to conduct the training seminars for students with disabilities on a career and employment issues and to continue the construction of the Career Development Center for students with disabilities.

University "Ukraine" actively cooperates with Professor K. Zaininger (USA), who regularly conducts the cycle of open lectures for colleagues and students of university. Systematic exchange of scientific and teaching materials with foreign colleagues: Professor P. Mittler (UK), Professor M. Koni M. Wisehaar (USA), Dr. I. Klaus (Germany) and with Professor E. Lindberg, Professor B. Linton (Sweden) and other leading academicians from Europe and the USA is carried out.

The university tends to widening and strengthening of international relationships. Institutes and regional affiliates promote collaboration with colleagues actively. Thus, Department of Organizations Management (Kyiv) effectively works with Information-Analytical Center of the U.S. Embassy in Ukraine. In recent years, international conferences such as the "Internet for Teachers", "Marketing in the USA", "Ethics Librarian" have been hosted.

== Student life ==
University provides equal opportunities to students to express themselves in training and in leisure. Such kinds of activities are supported by student self-government and creative, initiative lectures staff.

Club of Cheerful and Quick-Witted (KVN) and Students' Center of Amateur Activity with Studio Theater, Vocal and Dance Ensembles successfully run in the university. Bright and creative celebrations of noble dates such as Teacher's Day, the Day of Fatherland Defenders and traditional Ukrainian holiday - Maslyana, St. Mykolay, Ivana Kupala are constantly held here. The Cossack competitions are held at the university on the holiday of Pokrov. In addition to traditional holidays, the university "Ukraine" organizes beauty contests and discos.

The "Sayvo Nadiy" (Glow of Hope) Talent Festival is dedicated to the international day of disabled people and has become the tradition in University "Ukraine".

This event gives to the students with disabilities an opportunity to find and express themselves. The festival brings together students from many Ukrainian universities.

"The University Summer" is a great event in the creative life of the institution.

The Scout movement has become very popular among university students.

Volunteers of university "Ukraine" take part in many all-Ukrainian youth events: "The Cossack Way"gathering-march, "Vytoky", "Student Republic", International Eco-cultural festival "[Trypilske Kolo]". Students and faculty are the participants of the numerous sports events and competition at the university such as Sports Games, Physically Health Days especially for young people with different physical training. University has launched nationwide Sports Games for disabled students and many future champions have been found in them. Among the students and graduates of the university are many winners of national and international sporting events, and a real pride of the country is three Olympic champions and fifteen winners of the Paralympic and Deaflympic Games.

== Outstanding students and teachers ==
Since the foundation University "Ukraine" has united the prominent scientists, philanthropists and patrons, artists and athletes of national and international levels. Many lecturers of university "Ukraine" are honored educators. They have made a considerable contribution to the science and the image of Ukraine in international scientific circles. Among them Doctor of Political Sciences, Professor Valery M. Bebyk; Honoured Journalist of Ukraine, candidate of Philology Vasily Hubarets; Doctor of Engineering Sciences, Professor, Honoured Scientist of Ukraine Stanislav S. Zabara; Candidate of Philology, Doctor of Social and Economic Sciences, Professor, Honoured Journalist of Ukraine Vitaly Karpenko, a Candidate of Pedagogical Sciences, Professor, Honored Educator of Ukraine, Winner of the Socrates International Awards Ludmila P. Matvienko are among them.

=== Sports ===
Students of the university have achieved considerable success in sports. Including famous George Gutsalyuk, from Rivne, international class master of sports of Ukraine is a multi-winner world champion, European Champion - 2006, a multi-champion of Ukraine in kickboxing (WPKA) 2004–2009, World Cup Karate 2003, team captain of Ukraine.

Such honored coaches as Soslan G. Adyrkhayev, Roman P. Karpiuk, Gregoriy K. Sadoyan and others help students to achieve the highest results in sports.

Many students got victory through taking over their physical limitations. This fact is evidenced by the number of champions and winners of the Paralympic Games, among which Julia Batenkova (two silver and three bronze medals in biathlon and ski racing at the IXth Winter Paralympic Games in Turin (Italy)); Yury Kostyuk (gold, silver and double bronze medalist in biathlon and ski races IXth Winter Paralympic Games in Turin); Igor Litvinenko (second runner Paralympic Games Football (Austria), European Champion Cup); Dmitry Vynohradets (XIIIth Paralympic Games champion in swimming for athletes with lesions of the musculoskeletal system, Honorary Citizen of Poltava); Anatoly Szewczyk (double Champion XII and XIII Paralympic Games in football athletes from injuries of musculoskeletal system, the champion of World Games for Disabled Athletes Football (New London, USA)).

==== Deaflympics ====
Sergey Malyshevsky (runner of the Deaflympics in Australia, the bronze medalist of the XXIth Deaflympics in Taiwan, the world champion in Greco-Roman wrestling); Andrew Tkachenko (bronze medalist of the XXth and XXIst Deaflympics in Australia and Taiwan, silver medalist of the World Championship in Greco-Roman wrestling); Alexander Colodiy (the champion of XXIst Deaflympics in shooting, was awarded with the Order of Courage III); Julia Solyaruk (XX Deaflympics champion in volleyball); are among the winners and champions of Deaflympic Games.

=== Artists ===
There are many creative people among students and lecturers of university "Ukraine", whose songs, pictures and poems inspire others. They are the artist Anatoly Lomovskiy, Honored Artist of Ukraine, singer Svetlana Myrvoda, writer Vasily Hubarets, journalist Vitaly Karpenko. The courage and creativity of famous poets Yuri Titov, Gennadiy Horoviy, Oksana Radushynska; Olena Chynka and Michael Saveliev, who manage the Dance Ensemble, singer Inna Oliynyk and many others cause the extraordinary admiration.
