= Viktor Kirpichov =

Russian engineer and physicist

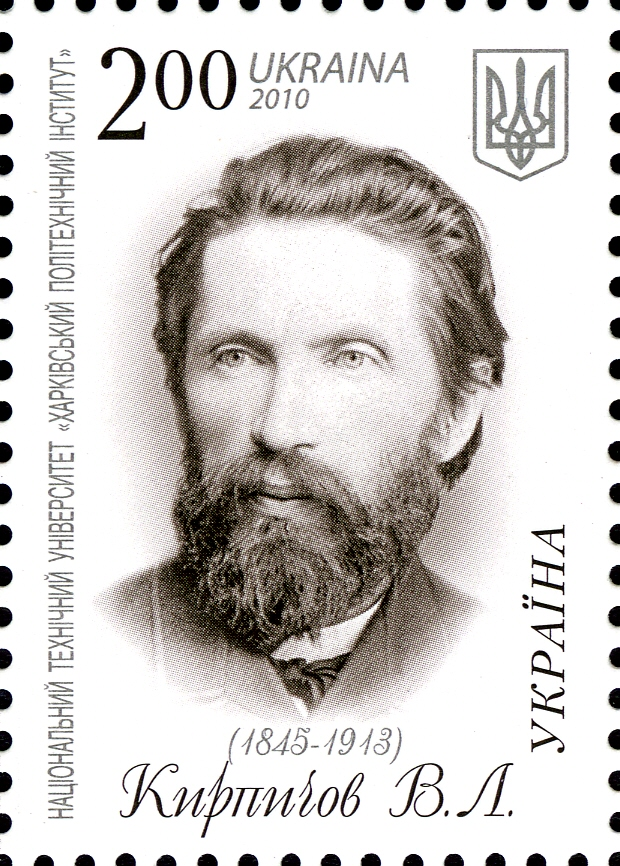
Kirpichov on a 2010 stamp of Ukraine

Viktor Lvovich Kirpichov (Russian: Ви́ктор Льво́вич Кирпичё́в; 8 October [O.S. 26 September] 1845, Saint Petersburg, Russian Empire – 20 October [O.S. 7 October] 1913, Saint Petersburg, Russian Empire) was a Russian engineer, physicist, and educational organizer, known especially for his work on applied and structural mechanics as well as for establishing the foundations for technical education in the Russian Empire.

== Early biography ==
Viktor Lvovich Kirpichov belonged to Russian nobility from St. Petersburg. He graduated from the Polotsk military school (1862) and St.Michael artillery school in Saint Petersburg (1863). In 1863–1870 he was in the faculty of Kronstadt military academy where he taught material science and mechanics. In 1873 he was a postdoc student of Gustav Kirchhoff in Germany. After that, until his move to Ukraine in 1885, he was a professor at Saint Petersburg Technological Institute. In 1882, he was responsible for investigation of the Borki train disaster.

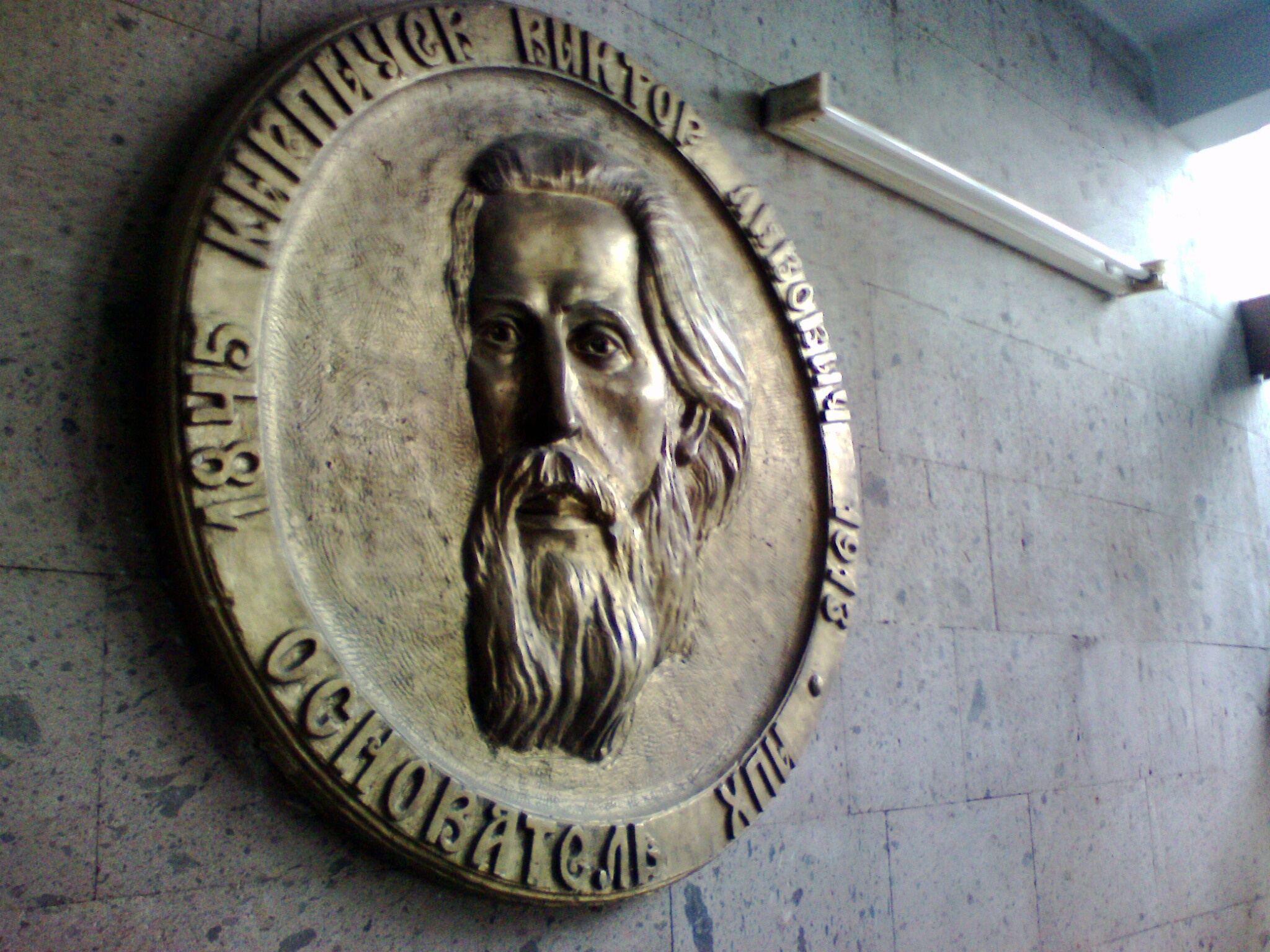
Kirpichov's plaque in the NTU "KhPI" building

== University founder in the south of the Russian Empire ==
Viktor Kirpichov is the most widely known in modern-day Ukraine as the founder and first rector of two prominent technical universities in this country (then a part of the Russian Empire):

- Kharkov Polytechnic Institute of Emperor Alexander III (a rector in 1885–1898)
- Kiev Polytechnic Institute of Emperor Alexander II (a rector in 1898–1902)

Founding these universities was a part of wide program of technical education in the Russian Empire set up by Dmitriy Mendeleev. Professor Kirpichov was a prominent provider of this program serving as a member of both a Working Committee for elaborating the project of common plan for professional education in the Russian Empire (1884), and the Committee for higher education (1897).

== USA visit ==
In 1893, Kirpichov was invited to USA, where he was an expert at the Chicago world's fair and visited numerous engineering facilities.

== Later years ==
During his last years, Professor Kirpichov returned to Saint Petersburg, where he taught applied mechanics in Saint Petersburg Technological Institute. He remained a Honored Professor of Kiev Polytechnic Institute until the end of his life.

He was buried at the Lutheran Volkovo Cemetery, Saint Petersburg.
