= Isaak Sigal =

Ukrainian scientist (1927–2026)

- Ісаак Сігал; Исаак Сигал
- Born: 31 March 1927; Vinnytsia, Ukrainian SSR, USSR
- Died: 20 October 2026 (aged 99)
- Education: Kyiv Polytechnic Institute
- Awards: Honored Scientist and Engineer of Ukraine (1998) Order of Merit Third Class (2009) Ukrainian State Science and Engineering Award (2012)
- Scientific career
- Fields: fuel combustion
- Workplaces: Gas Institute of NASU

Isaak Sigal (Russian: Исаак Яковлевич Сигал; Ukrainian: Ісаак Якович Сігал; 31 March 1927 – 20 October 2026) was a Ukrainian scientist in the field of fuel combustion and protection of the atmosphere from industrial pollution.

== Life and career ==
Isaac Yakovlevich Sigal was born in 1927 in the city of Vinnytsia. His father, Yakov Sigal, was an electric engineer. His mother, Gusta Shternberg, was a teacher. He graduated from Kyiv Polytechnic Institute in 1948 majoring in combustion equipment engineering. Since 1949 he worked at the Gas Institute under NASU (National Academy of Science of Ukraine), becoming a head of a department in 1961. He defended his master's dissertation in 1958, doctoral in 1971; in 1980 he became a full professor. In 1998, Isaak Sigal was granted the honorary title of Honored Scientist and Engineer of Ukraine.

He married Ella Zacharovna Tovbina, a pediatric and infant orthopedic doctor. Their son Oleksandr Sigal was born in 1955.

Sigal died on 20 October 2026, at the age of 99.

== Major monographs ==
- Sigal, I. Y. (1961). Газогорелочные устройства котельных установок [Gas Burner Units in Boiler-House Plane] (in Russian). Kyiv: Godtechizdat Ukrainian SSR.
- Sigal, I. Y. (1962). Сжигание газа в промышленных котельных [Gas Combustion in Industrial Boiler-Houses] (in Russian). Kyiv: State University Publishing House.
- Sigal, I. Y.; Lavrentsov, E. M.; Kosinov, O. I.; Dombrovskaya, E. P. (1967). Сжигание газа в промышленных котельных [Gas Water-Heating Industrial Heating Boilers] (in Russian). Kyiv: Technika.
- Sigal, I. Y. (1977). Защита воздушного бассейна при сжигании топлива [Air Protection During Fuel Combustion] (in Russian). Leningrad: Nedra.
- Sigal, I. Y. (1988). Защита воздушного бассейна при сжигании топлива [Air Protection During Fuel Combustion] (in Russian) (2nd ed.). Leningrad: Nedra.
- Sigal, I. Y.; Dombrovskaya, E. P.; Dupak, A. S. (1991). Методы снижения выбросов оксидов азота и серы в атмосферу электростанциями США [Methods of Lowering NOx and Sulphur Atmospheric Emissions by US Power Plants] (in Russian). Kyiv: NTOE & E of Ukrainian SSR.
- Sigal, I. Y.; Slavin, V. I.; Shilo, V. V. (1999). Очистка промышленных выбросов от оксидов серы и азота [Industrial Emissions Cleansing of Sulphur and Nitrogen Oxides] (in Russian). Kharkiv: Original.
- Mikhailenko, G. G.; Mironov, D. V.; Sigal, I. Y. (2001). Защита воздушного бассейна от оксидов серы [Air Protection from Sulphur Oxides] (in Russian). Odessa: Astroprint.

=== Edited by Isaak Sigal ===
- Образование окислов азота в процессах горения и пути снижения их выброса в атмосферу [Nitrogen Oxides Formation in the Combustion Operation and Ways of Lowering the Air Emissions] (in Russian). Kyiv: Znanie. 1974.
- Образование окислов азота в процессах горения и пути снижения выброса их в атмосферу [Nitrogen Oxides Formation in the Combustion Operation and Ways of Lowering the Atmospheric Emissions] (in Russian). Kyiv: Naukova Dumka. 1979.
- Окислы азота в продуктах сгорания топлив [Nitrogen Oxides in End Products of Fuel Combustion] (in Russian). Kyiv: Naukova Dumka. 1981.
- Термическая и каталитическая очистка газовых выбросов [Thermal and Catalytic Gas Emission Treatment] (in Russian). Kyiv: Naukova Dumka. 1984.
- Оксиды азота в продуктах сгорания и их преобразование в атмосфере [Nitrogen Oxides in Products of Combustion and their Transformation in the Atmosphere] (in Russian). Kyiv: Naukova Dumka. 1987.
- Термокаталитическая очистка и снижение токсичных выбросов в атмосферу [Thermal and Catalytic Cleansing and Lowering of Toxic Atmospheric Emissions] (in Russian). Kyiv: Naukova Dumka. 1989.
- Методическое пособие по проведению комплексных эколого-теплотехнических испытаний котлов, работающих на газе и мазуте [Technical Guide for Conducting a Composite Ecological and Thermotechnical Gas and Fuel Oil Boiler Tests] (in Russian). Kyiv: VNIPItransgas, offset press. 1992.

== Awards ==
- Ukrainian State Science and Engineering Award (2012)
- Order of Merit Third Class (2009)
- Honored Scientist and Engineer of Ukraine (1998)
