= Nadiia Omelchenko =

Ukrainian entrepreneur (born 1976)

- Born: June 11, 1976 (age 49)
- Citizenship: Ukraine
- Occupation: volunteer
- Awards: For assistance to the Armed Forces of Ukraine

Nadiia Omelchenko (Ukrainian: Надія Олександрівна Омельченко; born June 11, 1976, Kornyn, Zhytomyr Oblast, Ukraine) is a Ukrainian entrepreneur, Vice President of the IT-Integrator company, volunteer awarded by the medal "For assistance to the Armed Forces of Ukraine", software engineer, author of the ExpressPro and Service Desk software, co-founder of the Lysa Hora and Khmilna Muza.

== Biography ==
In 1999, Nadiia graduated from the Kyiv National Linguistic University. In 2006, she received a degree in management and economics from the Kyiv Business Institute at the Igor Sikorsky Kyiv Polytechnic Institute (NTUU KPI). In 2014, she obtained a degree in clinical psychology from the Kyiv Institute of Modern Psychology and Psychotherapy. From 2014 to 2017, Nadiia served as the CEO of the property management company Compass FM.

In 2015-2016, she worked as the director of personnel policy at the Octava group of companies.

In 2017, Nadiia co-founded the themed bar "Lysa Hora" in Kyiv and Khmilna Muza in 2021. Since March 2017, she has been the Vice President of IT-Integrator (provider of IT solutions for corporations and the public sector in Ukraine). In November 2020, she entered the list of TOP-25 top best managers of Ukraine, according to TOP100. Ratings of the largest and delo.ua.

In June 2022, for significant contributions to the organization and comprehensive assistance to the personnel of military units and subdivisions of the Armed Forces of Ukraine and active volunteer activities, she was awarded the medal "For assistance to the Armed Forces of Ukraine" by the Ministry of Defence of Ukraine.

== Civil Activity ==
In 2015, she coordinated the initiative of the educational program "Bad Girls Ventures Ukraine". In November 2017, she was included in the list of "TOP-20 Inspiring Women in STEM and became a mentor of the "Girls STEM". In March 2017, Nadiia became a teacher of the "Personnel Management" course at the MIM-Kyiv Business School.

In 2020, she became a mentor of Civic Tech Sisters, a project to support young women leaders in Ukraine and Germany.

In November 2020, she participated in the launch of the first Ukrainian podcast on women's leadership in IT — "Unbreakable Girls."

In December 2020, she participated in a social project "Entrepreneurship for Schoolchildren" educational series for the "Diia. Digital Education" platform.

=== Russian invasion ===
In 2022–2023, she became one of the heroines and patrons of the publication "UNBREAKABLE. A book about the resistance of Ukrainian women in the war against Russian aggressors".

Omelchenko actively assists the Ukrainian military in standing up to Russia's armed aggression, providing volunteer assistance to units of the Armed Forces of Ukraine, the State Emergency Service, and front-line volunteers.
