= Karlis Zalts =

Latvian mathematician

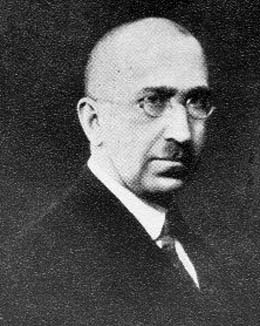
- Born: March 10, 1885; Latvia
- Died: 1953 (aged 67–68); Riga, Latvia
- Citizenship: Latvian
- Known for: Mechanical calculators, statistics and nomography, folklore, education, and philosophy
- Scientific career
- Fields: Mathematician

Karlis Zalts (10 March 1885 – 1953) was a Latvian mathematician with wide-ranging interests in topics such as mechanical calculators, statistics and nomography as well as folklore, education, and philosophy. His publications on folklore prevented him from publishing after 1946 by the Soviet Union.

== Biography and education ==
Karlis Zalts studied at the Real Gymnasium in Jelgava southwest of Riga and graduated in 1904 and then went to Ukraine to study engineering at the Kiev Polytechnic Institute. After graduating in 1912 he continued on there to teach. After Latvia became an independent country in 1918 Zalts decided to return to Latvia in 1921 with an appointment at the University of Latvia in Riga. To teach mathematics to engineering students until 1938. In 1928 he wanted to do mathematical research so he went back to school to graduate in mathematics in 1937 with a master's degree in nomography. He continued on to teach mathematics. The University of Latvia stayed in operation during the Second World War and Zalts started his research towards his thesis. He was awarded his doctorate in February 1944 for his thesis on the geometry of deformations.

== Prisoner of war and troubles after the war ==
The Germans overran Latvia and Zalts was forced to go to Dresden and work at an optical equipment plant to develop optical devices for the German military. When the Russians captured the plant on 1 May 1945 he became an interpreter for the Russians until 1 September 1945 when he was relocated to Moscow to be forced to be scientific consultant for the Special Construction Bureau. Finally on 16 March 1946 he was able to return to Riga. Trying to get back to his life in Latvia he worked at the university library and returned to teaching again in the Faculty of Engineering Sciences. Zalts was just about to be appointed to the new Institutes of the Latvian Academy of Sciences but Soviet background checks found his publications on folklore, education, and philosophy from the 1920s and 1930s. The Soviets also did not appreciate his many contributions to the Latvian Encyclopedia as this had been banned by the USSR in their desire to create one nation. Zalts now became an "unwelcome person" and while he could continue to teach mathematics to engineers he was never allowed to publish, attend conferences or be promoted at the university.

== Works ==
Zalts was a polyglot and had many wide-ranging interests in topics such as in mechanical calculators, statistics and nomography as well as folklore, education, and philosophy.
