= Mykhailo Zghurovskyi =

Ukrainian data scientist

- Михайло Згуровський
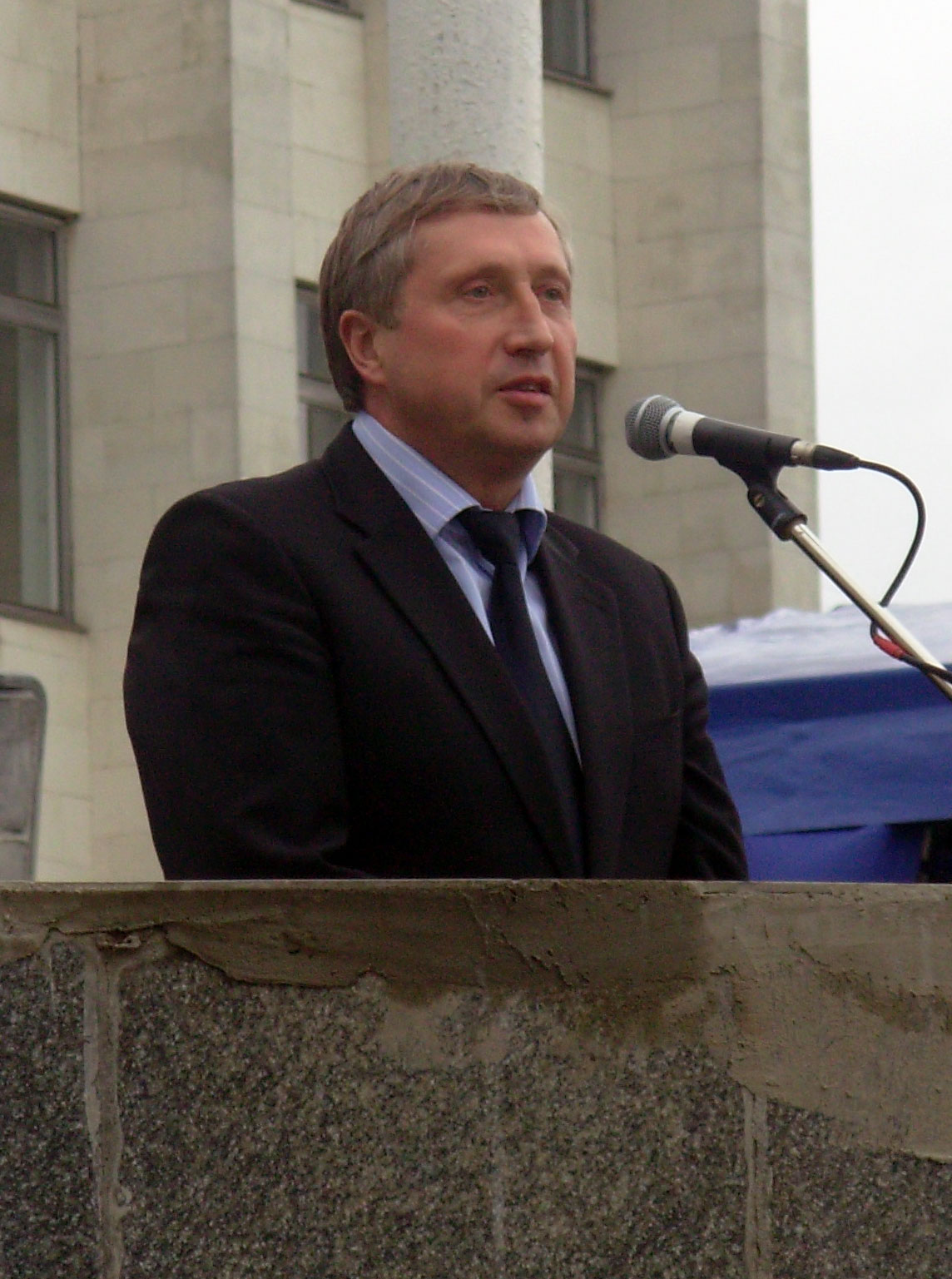
- Zghurovskyi in 2006

Rector of the Igor Sikorsky Kyiv Polytechnic Institute
- In office April 1992 – July 2024
- Preceded by: Petro Talanchuk
- Succeeded by: Anatoliy Melnychenko

Minister of Education and Science of Ukraine
- In office November 1994 – January 1999
- President: Leonid Kuchma
- Prime Minister: Vitaliy Masol; Yevhen Marchuk; Pavlo Lazarenko; Valeriy Pustovoitenko
- Preceded by: Petro Talanchuk
- Succeeded by: Valentyn Zaichuk

Personal details
- Born: 30 January 1950 (age 76) Skala-Podilska, Ternopil Oblast, Ukrainian SSR, Soviet Union (now Ukraine)
- Education: Kyiv Polytechnic Institute

Mykhailo Zakharovych Zghurovskyi (Note: Also spelled as Zghurovskyi, Zhurovsky, Zhurovskyi or Zgurovsky) (Ukrainian: Михайло Захарович Згуровський) is a Ukrainian scientist who served as Minister of Education and Science of Ukraine (1994–1999) and rector of the Igor Sikorsky Kyiv Polytechnic Institute.

He is also a Doctor of Technical Sciences, Professor, Academician of the National Academy of Sciences of Ukraine, National Academy of Pedagogical Sciences of Ukraine, Presidium member of the National Academy of Sciences of Ukraine, foreign member of the Russian Academy of Sciences (On 8 April 2022 announced withdrawal from the foreign Academy members), corresponding Member of the Division of Mathematics and the Natural Sciences in the Austrian Academy of Sciences. He is also a renowned scientist and specialist in the field of cybernetics, systems analysis, big data mining and decision theory. He is a Scientific Supervisor of the Institute for Applied System Analysis (part of both Ministry of Education and Science of Ukraine and National Academy of Sciences of Ukraine), former Ukrainian education minister.

He generalized the main provisions of the theory of system analysis, laid the foundations of system mathematics, proposed a new approach to the theory of extremal problems for nonlinear operator, differential-operator equations and inclusions, variational inequalities. The most famous applications of his scientific research results relate to the field of mathematical geophysics, geoinformatics, socio-economic problems of modern society.

== Biography ==
Mykhailo Zghurovskyi was born on 30 January 1950 in the city of Skala-Podilska in Ukraine's Ternopil Oblast. In 1975, he graduated from the Kyiv Polytechnic Institute, faculty of control systems, with a specialty in "Automated control systems". His PhD thesis was titled "Optimal discrete control of one class of distributed processes of unsteady heat transfer" (1979). His Doctoral thesis was titled "Computer-aided design and optimal control of non-stationary processes and fields under data uncertainty" (1984).

From March 1975 to August 1986 he was an engineer, senior engineer, senior researcher, and professor of the Department of Technical Cybernetics at the Kyiv Polytechnic Institute. From May 1986 to August 1987 he was the Deputy Head of the Research Department of the Ministry of Higher and Secondary Specialized Education of the Ukrainian SSR.

From August 1987 to March 1988 he was again a professor of the Department of Technical Cybernetics at the Kyiv Polytechnic Institute. From March 1988 to April 1992 he was Vice-Rector for Academic Affairs of the Kyiv Polytechnic Institute. From April 1992 till July 2024 he was the Rector of the Kyiv Polytechnic Institute.

He was Minister of Education and Science of Ukraine from November 1994 to January 1999.

From 1996 to 2015 he was Director (since 2015 - the Scientific Supervisor) of the Institute of Applied Systems Analysis of the Ministry of Education and Science of Ukraine and the National Academy of Sciences of Ukraine (based on Kyiv Polytechnic Institute). Currently holds this position and the position of professor in Kyiv Polytechnic Institute.

In 2006 Zghurovskyi was the founder of the operation in Ukraine of non-governmental organization (WDS-Ukraine), which is a full member of the World Data System (WDS) of the International Science Council (ISC). The center (WDS-Ukraine) specializes in interdisciplinary researches of complex systems of various nature.

The scientific school of Zghurovskyi prepared and trained fourteen doctors and more than 50 candidates of sciences. He is the author of 52 inventions, the author and co-author of more than 820 scientific papers, 43 monographs and textbooks published in Germany, USA, Switzerland, Poland, Japan, China, Ukraine and other countries of the world.

== Public service ==
Since March 1995 - Deputy Head of the Commission on Higher Education Reform in Ukraine.

Since August 1995 - Member of the State Commission on the Science Reorganization field.

From October 1995 to January 1999 - Chairman of the State Accreditation Commission of Ukraine.

From February 1997 to January 1999 - Member of the Council on Language Policy under the President of Ukraine.

From 18 January 2018 to 9 July 2019 - member (from 23 January 2018 - chairman) of the Supervisory Board of the State Concern "Ukroboronprom".

From 2023 - Head of the Ukrainian Peace Council

=== Membership in foreign/international scientific communities ===
National Representative of the Scientific Committee of the World Data System - WDS (Paris, France).

Member of the Board of the Earth Data Network for Education and Scientific Exchange - EDNES (Strasbourg, France).

National Representative to the International Science Council - ISC (Paris, France).

National Representative of the Committee on Data for Science and Technology - CODATA (Paris, France).

Member of the UNESCO Governing Committee on the Education for Sustainable Development Program.

President of the Network of the Black Sea Universities Network - BSUN (Constance, Romania) 2008–2010.

== Awards and medals ==
- Honored Worker of Science and Technology of Ukraine (2000)
- Three times laureate of the State Prize of Ukraine in Science and Technology (1990, 1999, 2005)
- Laureate of the V.M. Glushkov award of National Academy of Sciences of Ukraine (1999)
- Laureate of the V.S. Mikhalevich award of National Academy of Sciences of Ukraine (2004)
- Laureate of the S.A. Lebedev award of National Academy of Sciences of Ukraine (2020)
- Laureate of the Award of the Cabinet of Ministers of Ukraine for the Development and Implementation of the Innovative technologies (2023)
- Awarded with the state awards and prizes of Ukraine (full holder of the Order of Merit), Vietnam, Italy, Estonia, China, Poland, France, Japan
- Awarded with "Złota Odznaka Honorowa", Poland (1995)
- Awarded with "Academician M.A. Sadovsky" medal, Russian academy of sciences (2006)
- Awarded with the special sign of academician, Russian academy of sciences (2008)
- Awarded with the "Zasłużony dla Politechniki Poznańskiej" medal ("For the services to Poznan University of Technology"), Poland (2018)
- He has the title of "Doctor Honoris Causa" of more than 15 universities in Ukraine, Belarus, Poland, and Russia.

== Selected publications ==
- Zgurovsky M.Z., Mel’nik V.S. Nonlinear Analysis and Control of Physical Processes and Fields. Springer-Verlag Berlin Heidelberg, 2004.- 508 p.
- Zgurovsky M.Z. General pattern of global system conflicts and global threats of the 21st century, Cybern. and Syst. Analysis, 43, No.5,687–695(2007)
- Zgurovsky M.Z., Pankratova N.D. System Analysis: Theory and Applications. Springer-Verlag Berlin Heidelberg, 2007.- 447 p.
- Zgurovsky M. Z. Interrelation between Kondratieff cycles and global systemic conflicts. Cybern. and Syst. Analysis. 45, No.5, 742–749 (2009)
- Zgurovsky M.Z. Metric aspects of periodic processes in economy and society. Cybern. and Syst. Analysis. 46, No.2, 167–172 (2010)
- Zgurovsky M.Z., Mel’nik V.S., Kasyanov P.O. Evolution Inclusions and Variation Inequalities for Ears Data Processing I. Springer-Verlag Berlin Heidelberg, 2011.- 247 p.
- Zgurovsky M.Z., Mel’nik V.S., Kasyanov P.O. Evolution Inclusions and Variation Inequalities for Ears Data Processing II. Springer-Verlag Berlin Heidelberg,2011.- 274 p.
- Zgurovsky M.Z., Kasyanov P.O., Kapustyan O.V., Valero J., Zadoianchuk N.V. Evolution Inclusions and Variation Inequalities for Ears Data Processing III. Springer- Verlag Berlin Heidelberg, 2012.- 330 p.
- Zgurovsky M.Z., Sadovnichiy V.A. Continuous and Distributed Systems. Theory and Applications. Springer International Publishing Switzerland, 2014. – 333 p.
- Sadovnichiy V.A., Zgurovsky M.Z. Continuous and Distributed Systems II. Theory and Applications. Springer International Publishing Switzerland, 2015. – 387 p.
- Zgurovsky M.Z., Zaychenko Y.P. The Fundamentals of Computational Intelligence: System Approach. Springer International Publishing Switzerland, 2016. – 375 p.
- Sadovnichiy V.A., Zgurovsky M.Z. Advances in Dynamical Systems and Control. Springer International Publishing Switzerland, 2016. – 471 p.
- Zgurovsky M.Z., Kasyanov. P.O. Qualitative and Quantitative Analysis of Nonlinear Systems. Springer International Publishing Switzerland, 2018. – 240 p.
- Sadovnichiy V.A., Zgurovsky M.Z. Modern Mathematics and Mechanics: Fundamentals, Problems and Challenges. Springer International Publishing Switzerland, 2019. – 557 p.
- Zgurovsky M.Z., Pavlov A.A. Combinatorial Optimization Problems in Planning and Decision Making: Theory and Applications. Springer Nature Switzerland, 2019. – 518 p.
- Zgurovsky M.Z., Zaychenko Y.P. Big Data: Conceptual Analysis and Applications. Springer International Publishing Switzerland, 2019. – 277 p.
- Zgurovsky M.Z., Sineglazov V.M., Chumachenko E.I. Artificial Intelligence Systems Based on Hybrid Neural Networks. Springer International Publishing, 2021. – 512 p.
- Sadovnichiy V.A., Zgurovsky M.Z. Contemporary Approaches and Methods in Fundamental Mathematics and Mechanics. Springer International Publishing, 2021. — 522 p.
