= Izvestiya Vysshikh Uchebnykh Zavedenii. Radioelektronika =

- Discipline: Electrical engineering, electronic engineering, electronics
- Language: Russian
- Edited by: Fedor F. Dubrovka

Publication details
- History: 1958-present
- Publisher: Kyiv Polytechnic Institute (Ukraine)
- Frequency: Monthly
- Open access: Hybrid
- Impact factor: 0.167 (2013)

Standard abbreviations
- ISO 4: Izv. Vyss. Uchebnykh Zaved. Radioelektron.

Indexing
- CODEN: IVUZB5
- ISSN: 0021-3470 (print); 2307-6011 (web)
- LCCN: 70648580

Links
- Journal homepage; Online access; Online archive

Radioelectronics and Communications Systems
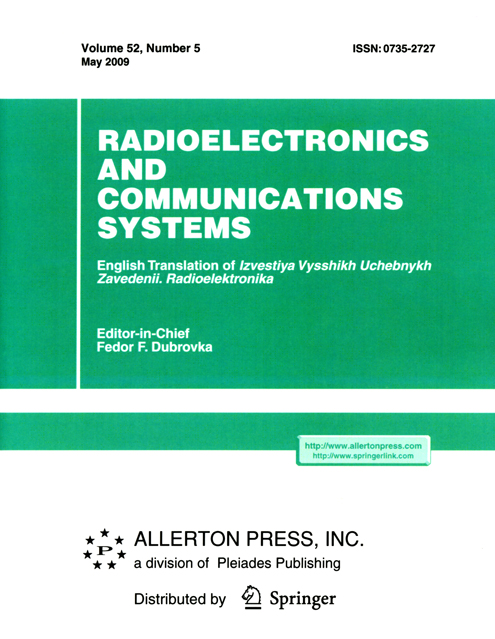
- Discipline: Electrical engineering, electronic engineering, electronics
- Language: English
- Edited by: Fedor F. Dubrovka

Publication details
- Publisher: Springer Science+Business Media
- Frequency: Monthly
- Open access: Hybrid
- Impact factor: 0.167 (2013)

Standard abbreviations
- ISO 4: Radioelectron. Commun. Syst.

Indexing
- CODEN: RCSYDS
- ISSN: 0735-2727 (print); 1934-8061 (web)
- LCCN: 83648007
- OCLC no.: 180146281

Links
- Journal homepage; Online archive

Izvestiya Vysshikh Uchebnykh Zavedenii. Radioelektronika is a monthly peer-reviewed scientific journal published in Ukraine that covers electrical engineering, electronic engineering, and electronics. An English translation is published as Radioelectronics and Communications Systems. The Russian-language version is published by the Kyiv Polytechnic Institute and is one of several journals from the series Izvestiya Vysshikh Uchebnykh Zavedenii published by different institutes of the Soviet Union.

== Scope ==
The journal covers theoretical problems of radio-engineering, results of research, materials of scientific conferences and meetings, information on scientific work in higher educational institutions, news, and bibliographic materials.

The journal contains the following sections:

- antenna-feeding and microwave devices,
- vacuum and gas-discharge devices,
- solid-state electronics and integrated circuit engineering,
- optical radar, communication and information processing systems,
- use of computers for research and design of radio-electronic devices and systems,
- quantum electronic devices,
- design of radio-electronic devices,
- radar and radio navigation,
- radio engineering devices and systems,
- radio engineering theory,
- medical radioelectronics

== Abstracting and indexing ==
The journal is abstracted and indexed in Academic OneFile, Inspec, SCOPUS, Russian Science Citation Index, VINITI, Gale, OCLC, SCImago, Summon by Serial Solutions and EI-Compendex.

== History ==
The journal was established in 1958 as Izvestiya Vysshikh Uchebnykh Zavedenii Ministry of Higher and Specialized Secondary Education USSR. Radiotekhnika, with S. I. Tetel'baum as editor-in-chief. It was renamed in 1967 as Izvestiya Vysshikh Uchebnykh Zavedenii Ministry of Higher and Specialized Secondary Education USSR. Radioelektronika with Yaroslav K. Trokhimenko as editor-in-chief. The journal obtained its current title in 1992. Fedor F. Dubrovka succeeded Trokhimenko as editor-in-chief in 2009.

In 1992, the Ministry of Education and Science of Ukraine and the Kiev Polytechnic Institute took over the publication of the journal.

== English version ==
In 1968, Faraday Press (United States) published the first issue of the English version of the journal, which was published as Radioelectronics and Communications Systems. From 1977, translation and publication of the journal moved to Allerton Press. Since 2007, the English version is distributed by Springer Science+Business Media.
