= Petro Talanchuk =

Ukrainian politician

- Петро Таланчук
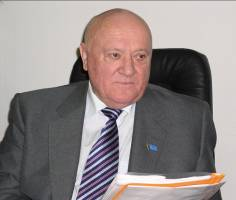

Minister of Education and Science of Ukraine
- In office 1992–1994
- Preceded by: Ivan Zyazyun
- Succeeded by: Mykhailo Zghurovskyi

Personal details
- Born: 1 July 1938 (age 88) Horodyshche-Kosivske, Kyiv Oblast, Ukrainian SSR, Soviet Union

Petro Mykhaylovych Talanchuk (Ukrainian: Петро Михайлович Таланчук; born 1 July 1938) is a Ukrainian political and public figure. He holds a Doctor of Technical Sciences. He was rector of the Kyiv Polytechnic Institute (1987 to 1992) and the First Minister of Education of Ukraine (1992 to 1994).

== Early life ==
He was born on 1 July 1938 in the village of Horodyshche-Kosivske, which was then part of the Ukrainian SSR in the Soviet Union. After graduating from the Rudosilska Secondary School, he worked on a kolkhoz entitled "Ukraina", and during this time served as an instructor of the Komsomol for the village of Volodarka. In 1957, he was mobilized to complete his mandatory military service in the Soviet Armed Forces. While in the armed forces, he attended the A. A. Zhdanov Naval Political School and then the Saint Petersburg Naval Institute to become a military journalist, but was demobilized due to military reductions in 1960. Upon returning to Ukraine, he entered the Kyiv Polytechnic Institute, where he majored in mechanical engineering, graduating in 1965.

He would then spend most of his career at KPI. He was first assigned to KPI's Department of Precision Mechanics Instruments as an assistant, was later elected chair of the institute's trade union committee. He defended his Candidate of Sciences at KPI in 1972, and was then appointed Vice-Rector for Education Work and Head of the Department of Precision Mechanics Instruments. In 1986, he defended his Doctor of Sciences dissertation. He was elected Rector of KPI in 1987 in its first democratic elections with 68 of 72 of the votes. He remained recotr until 1992, when he became founder and president of the Academy of Engineering Sciences of Ukraine. In addition, in 1999, he founded the Open International University of Human Development "Ukraine", which he was elected president of.

== Political career ==
In 1989, he was elected a Deputy of the Supreme Soviet of the USSR. He was elected to the Oktyabrsky District of Kyiv (district no. 466). He served within the parliament until 1991, where he became an advocate for democratic reform and in February 1992 was appointed the first Minister of Education and Science of Ukraine. As minister, he oversaw education reforms, and the creation of the national program "Education. Ukraine XXI Century".
