= Queen Victoria Museum =

Queen Victoria Museum may refer to:

- Queen Victoria Museum and Art Gallery (since 1891) in Launceston, Tasmania
- A previous name of the Zimbabwe Museum of Human Sciences in Harare, Zimbabwe
- Victoria Gallery & Museum (since 2008) in Liverpool, England
