= Kyiv Polytechnic Institute =

Public technological university in Kyiv, Ukraine

Coordinates: 50°26′59″N 30°27′39″E

Igor Sikorsky Kyiv Polytechnic Institute, KPI
- Національний технічний університет України «Київський політехнічний інститут імені Ігоря Сікорського», НТУУ "КПІ"
- Polytechnic small coat of arms
- Other name: see § Name
- Type: National, research university
- Established: 1898; 128 years ago
- Affiliations: Ministry of Education and Science of Ukraine
- Rector: Anatolii Melnychenko
- Administrative staff: ~2,500
- Students: ~25,000
- Location: Kyiv, Ukraine
- Campus: 395 acres (1.60 km^{2})
- Colors: Dark blue
- Website: kpi.ua
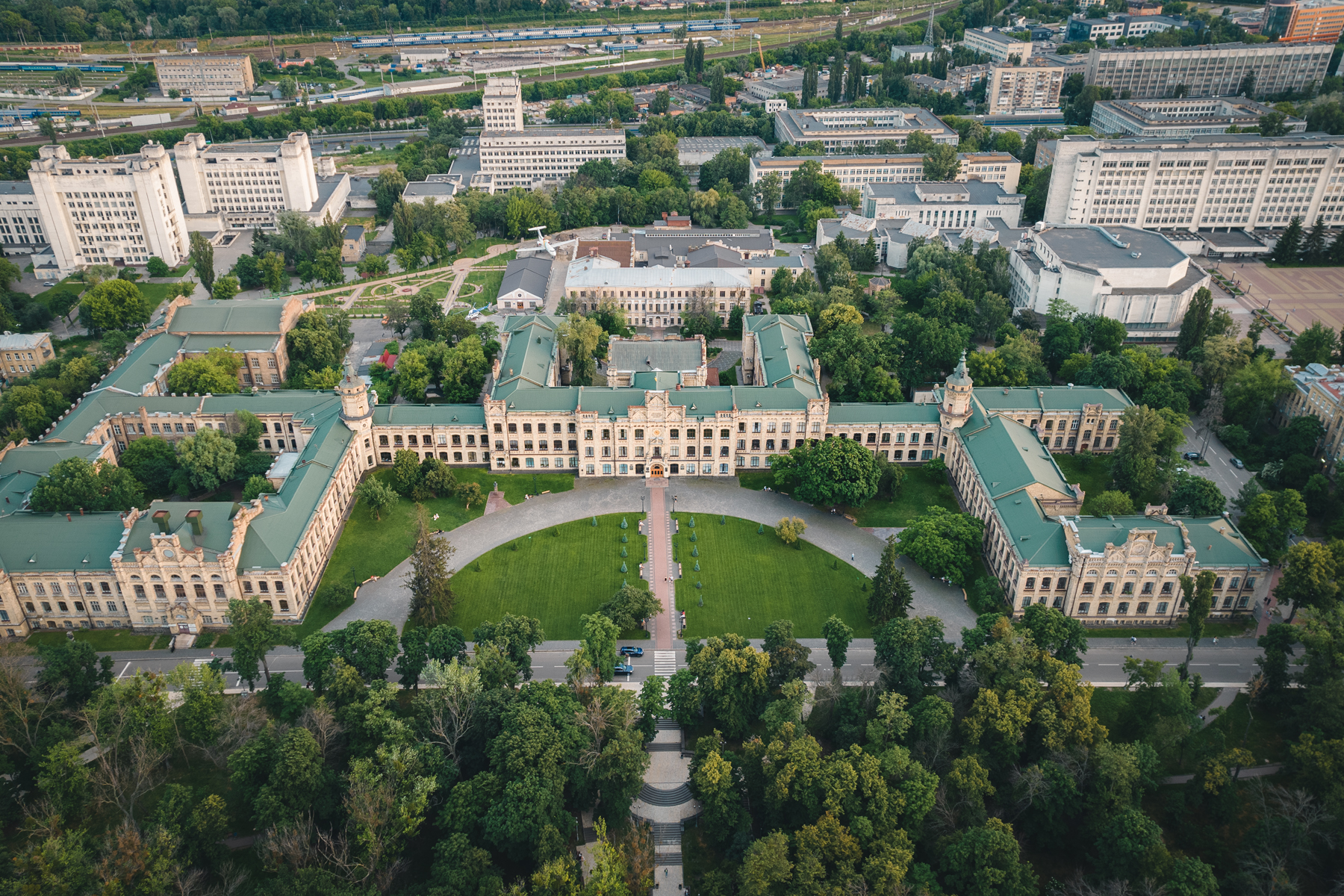

Immovable Monument of National Significance of Ukraine
- Official name: Комплекс споруд Національного політехнічного університету "Київський політехнічний інститут" (Complex of buildings of the National Polytechnic University "Kyiv Polytechnic Institute")
- Type: History
- Reference no.: 260038-Н

The Kyiv Polytechnic Institute (abbr. KPI, Ukrainian: Київський політехнічний інститут, КПІ, romanized: Kyivskyi politekhnichnyi instytut; official full title National Technical University of Ukraine "Igor Sikorsky Kyiv Polytechnic Institute") is a national public technological university in Kyiv, Ukraine. KPI has long been regarded as the highest-ranked technical school in Ukraine and has played a major role in the country's scientific and technological development.

== Name ==
In the long period of existence, the name of the institute has changed several times:

- 1898–1918 Kiev Polytechnic Institute of Emperor Alexander II
- 1918–1934 Kyiv Polytechnic Institute
- 1934–1948 Kyiv Industrial Institute
- 1948–1968 Order of Lenin Kyiv Polytechnic Institute
- 1968–1992 Order of Lenin Kyiv Polytechnic Institute in memory of the 50th anniversary of the Great October Socialist Revolution
- 1992–1995 Kyiv Polytechnic Institute
- 1995–2016 National Technical University of Ukraine "Kyiv Polytechnic Institute"
- 2016– National Technical University of Ukraine "Igor Sikorsky Kyiv Polytechnic Institute"

== History ==
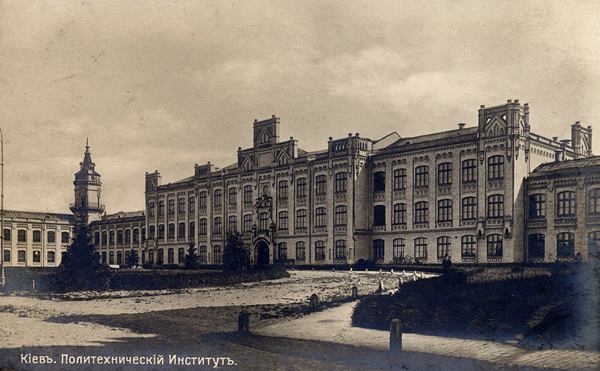
An early-20th century postcard with the photo of the institute's main building

=== Establishment ===
The institute was founded as the Kiev Polytechnic Institute of Emperor Alexander II on 31 August 1898. Its establishment was the result of partnership between the state and private sector encouraged by Sergei Witte, who served as finance minister of the Russian Empire at that time. The financing for the institution was provided by Kyiv City Duma and private donors, including the Tereshchenko family and Lazar Brodsky. The construction of the current building complex was finished in 1902. Until then, the institute rented space at the building of Commercial School located on Vorovsky Street. At that time, it had four departments: Mechanical, Chemical, Agricultural, and Civil Engineering. The first enrolment constituted of 360 students. Prominent scientists Dmitri Mendeleev, Nikolai Zhukovsky and Kliment Arkadyevich Timiryazev provided substantial scientific and organizational assistance in the founding of the institute.

Viktor Kyrpychov, the founder of the Kharkiv Polytechnic Institute, became the first rector of the KPI. It was largely due to Kyrpychov's efforts that such professors like V.P. Yermakov, S.M. Reformatsky, M.I. Konovalov or Vladimir Zworykin became members of the first faculty. The institute's scientific library was organized by Ukrainian art historian Mykola Biliashivskyi. The institute's director at that time was appointed directly by the imperial government after nomination by the Ministry of Finance.

=== Development under the Tsarist rule ===
Between its establishment and 1913 the number of students in the institute grew from 360 to 2,313. The full course of studies lasted 4 years. In reality graduation usually took a longer time, and the median age of the university's alumni was 27–28 years. The social origin of KPI's students were much more diverse than in other higher schools of that time: between 1897 and 1913 the share of nobles studying in the establishment fell from 47.7 to 36.2%, meanwhile that of peasants' children grew from 5.9 to 16.3%. The share of Jews among KPI's students in 1907 stood at 23%, contravening the established quotas. The institute was involved in the 1899 All-Russian student strike, which resulted in arrest and exile of 32 students. In the beginning of 1899, the underground organizational committee was established and had a close relationship with the Kyiv Council of United Communities and Organizations. During the Revolution of 1905 the institute served as a major centre of revolutionary movement in Kyiv, with its students being affiliated with radical groups. A "Ukrainian commune", which consisted of 150-200 students of the establishment, co-operated with Ukrainian social-democratic and socialist revolutionary parties.

In 1909 the Kyiv Society of Aerial Navigation was founded at the institute, involving such prominent figures as Igor Sikorsky, Fedir Anders and Nikolai Delaunay (father of Boris Delaunay). Another KPI graduate Fedir Tereshchenko became known as a pioneer of airplane construction. Among prominent figures who taught at the institute during that time were Grigory Dubelir, Yevhen Paton, Stephen Timoshenko, Lev Pisarzhevsky and Mykola Pymonenko. During the First World War in 1915 part KPI was temporarily evacuated to Rostov on Don, and a field hospital was created on the institute's premises.

=== Soviet rule ===
Actively developing, the Kyiv Polytechnic Institute became the basis for expanding and strengthening the network of higher education in Kyiv. In 1923–1933 several institutions were created on the basis of departments and individual specialties of the KPI. On March 1, 1919 Engineering Courses for the staff of the Red Army were established at the institute, which in 1937 became the basis for the M. I. Kalinin Kyiv Military School, the predecessor of modern Military Institute of Telecommunications and Informatization of NTUU "KPI".

During the 1920s and 1930s the institute played a major role in the industrialization and became one of the biggest establishments of higher technical education in the Soviet Union. At that time the recruitment was students was performed according to the class principle, and between the late 1920s and mid-1930s the share of students with a working class background rose from 44 to 68 per cent. The institute's students were employed by major industrial enterprises of the USSR.

During the German-Soviet War many students, alumni and members of the educational staff of the instutite volunteered or were mobilized into the Red Army, fighting on various fronts. The instutute itself was evacuated to Tashkent. During the war many of its building were destroyed, and its property was plundered. After the liberation of Kyiv in November 1943 the instutute resumed its activities, and its staff engaged in restoration works.

On January 1, 1954 the Publishing-Polygraphic Institute Since was founded in Kyiv on the basis of the arts and crafts school of printers No 18, as an educational and consultative point (UCP) of the Moscow printing institute. It became part of the KPI in 1989, and has been known under its modern name since September 6, 2004.

=== Independent Ukraine ===
In 1995 the institute was reformed into a university and received national status. In September 2003 KPI became one of the first Ukrainian universities to sign the European Magna Charta Universitatum.

=== Kyiv Polytechnic Institute during Russo-Ukrainian war ===
In 2022, during the full-scale invasion of Ukraine by the Russian Federation, Igor Sikorsky Kyiv Polytechnic Institute faced new challenges arising from the conflict.

==== Defense support and charity ====
KPI expressed active support for the defense of the country. The university created a charity fund to purchase military equipment at the request of students and graduates who joined the Armed Forces.

==== Collaboration with the University of Sheffield ====
The University of Sheffield began cooperation with KPI, which provides a wide range of practical assistance. The partnership will see the University of Sheffield donates £20,000 to build a bomb shelter on the KPI campus. It will also provide laboratory equipment and open access to its library resources, enabling KPI staff and students to access various online journals, texts, and resources.

==== Transfer of information systems to the cloud ====
One of the crucial steps KPI took was moving its critical digital infrastructure to cloud storage. This made it possible to ensure the university's functioning virtually, mainly to conduct training in remote mode and to ensure the management and storage of large volumes of data. The initiator of this process was Andrii Hubskyi, a KPI graduate who asked his partners to assist in matters of communication with the Ministry of Digital Transformation. Thanks to his efforts, cooperation with Amazon was established, and the process of migration of critical digital infrastructure to the cloud environment was implemented.

==== Points of invincibility ====
There are several security points on the university campus. One of them is in the first building. Employees of the Department of Property and Social Affairs created it. The room has laptops, high-speed Starlink Internet, light, and printing equipment. The item is located in the 157th office. In total, at least five such points operate on the territory of KPI.

==== Shelters ====
KPI presented the project of the innovative bomb shelter CLUST SPACE, which is being created in the central library. The bomb shelter will be located in a basement with an area of 600 square meters. The design project of the multifunctional shelter was developed by the studio of architect Pavlo Peker, who has experience working with similar projects in Iraq and Libya.

== Organisation ==
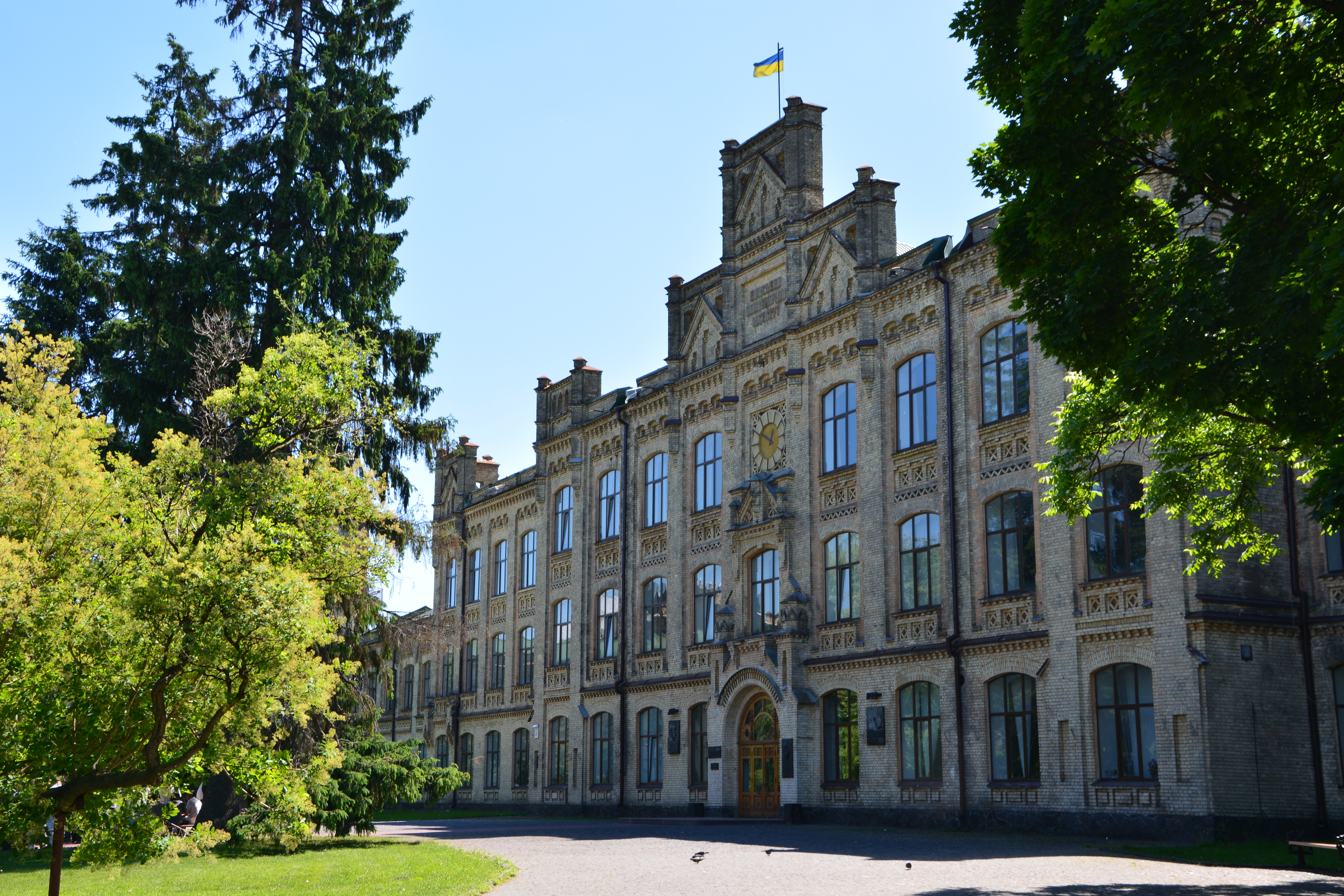
The Kyiv Polytechnic's main building

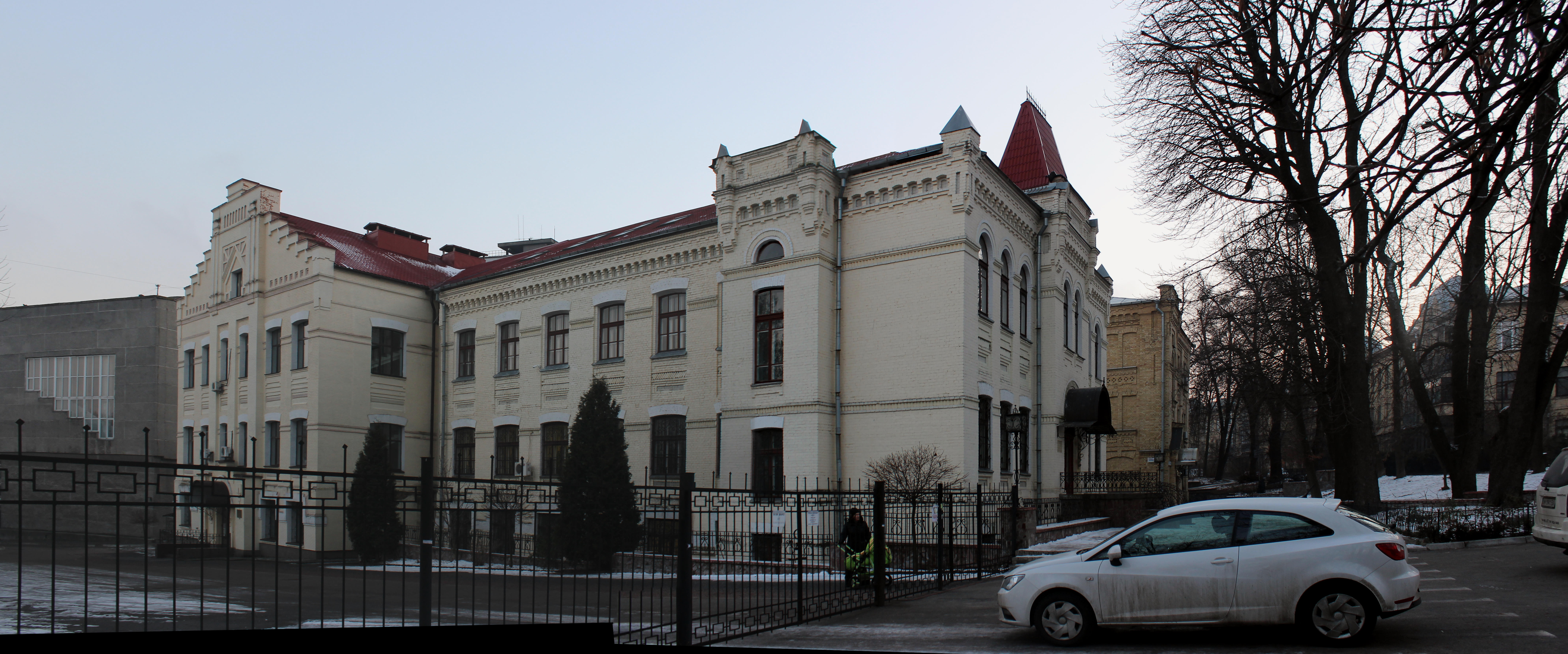
Building of old dining hall (part of the original building complex)

=== Institutes ===
- Educational, Science, and Scientific Complex "Institute of Applied Systems Analysis" (ESC IASA);
- Educational and Research Institute of Telecommunication Systems (ITS);
- Institute of Energy Saving and Energy Management (IEE);
- Institute of Aerospace Technologies (IAT);
- Institute of Special Communication and Information Security (ISIS);
- Mechanics and Machine-Building Institute (MMI);
- Institute of Materials Science and Welding (IMZ);
- Publishing and Printing Institute (VPI)
- Physics and Engineering Institute (PTI);
- Inter-branch Institute of Post-graduate Education;
- Institute of Pre-admission education and Vocational Guidance.

=== Faculties ===
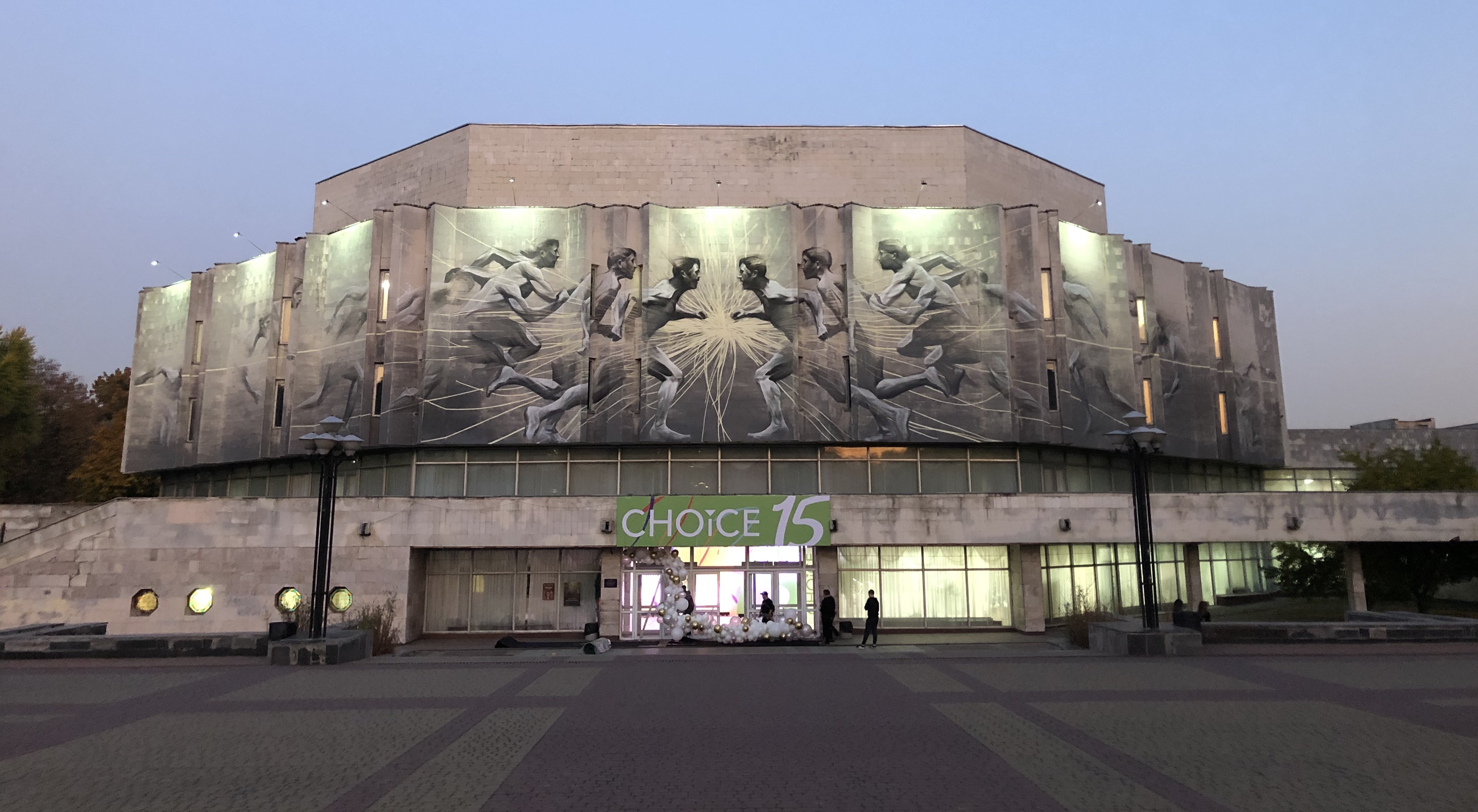
KPI Culture and Arts Centre

- Applied Mathematics (FPM);
- Biomedical Engineering (FBE);
- Biotechnology and Biotechnics (FBT);
- Chemical Engineering (IHF);
- Chemical Technology (XTF);
- Electric Power Engineering and Automatics (FEA);
- Electronics (FEL);
- Heat and Power Engineering (TEF);
- Informatics and Computer Engineering (FIOT);
- Instrumentation Engineering (PBF);
- Linguistics (FL);
- Management and Marketing (FMM);
- Physics and Mathematics (FMF);
- Radio Engineering (RTF);
- Sociology and Law (FSP).

=== Facilities ===
The university has two campuses, the central one being located in Kyiv, and the other in town of Slavutych.

The Kyiv campus of the university is located near the city centre in a park named after the university.

Almost 9,000 students from outside Kyiv are accommodated in 21 dormitories, 3 of them for married students. The living conditions at the dormitories is a matter of numerous complaints of their inhabitants, with four people sharing a single room measuring 18 square-meters.

The institute has an outpatient medical department for employers and students.

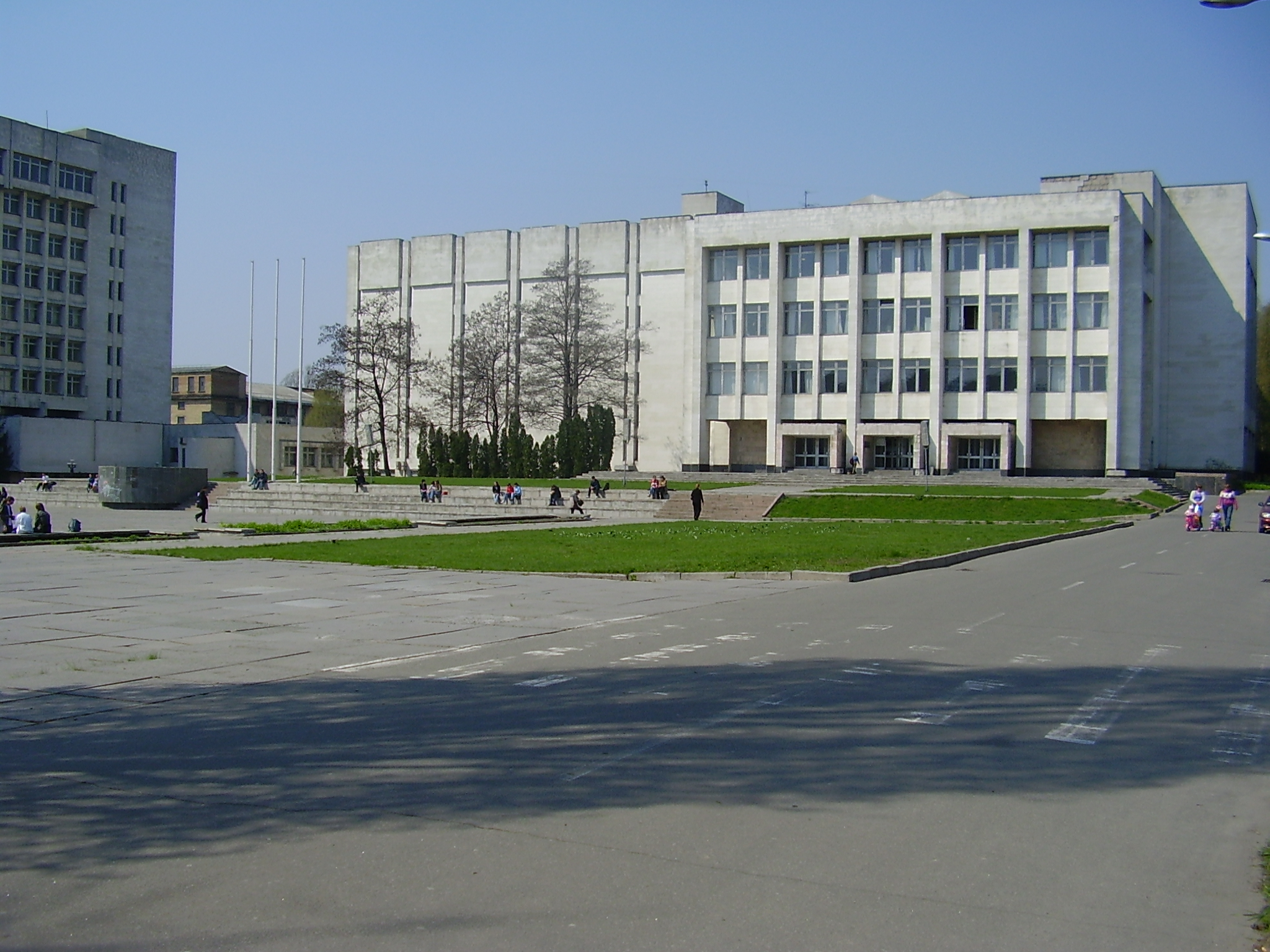
KPI – Technical Library

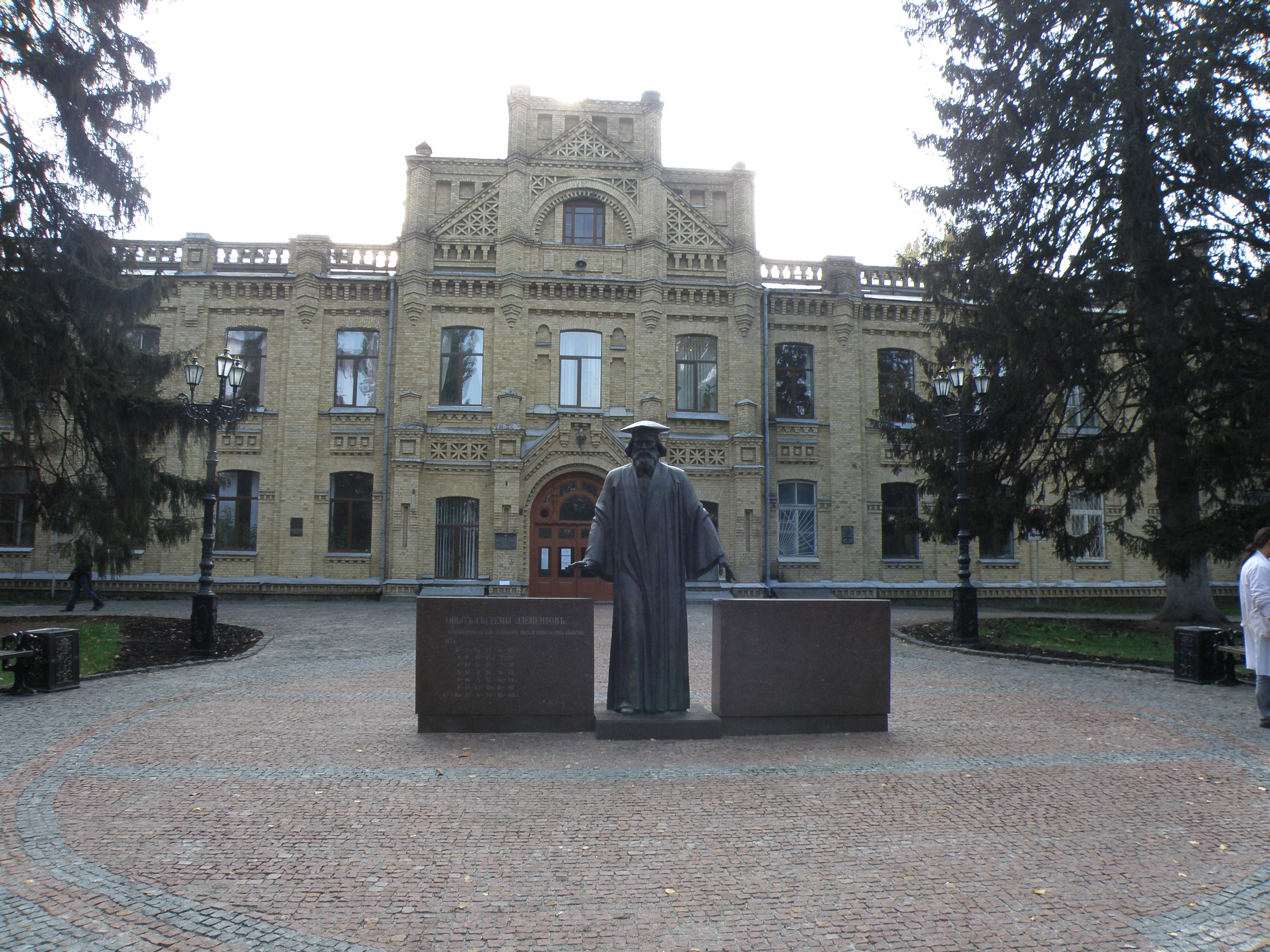
Monument to chemist Dmitri Mendeleev, who was the first chairman of the examination committee

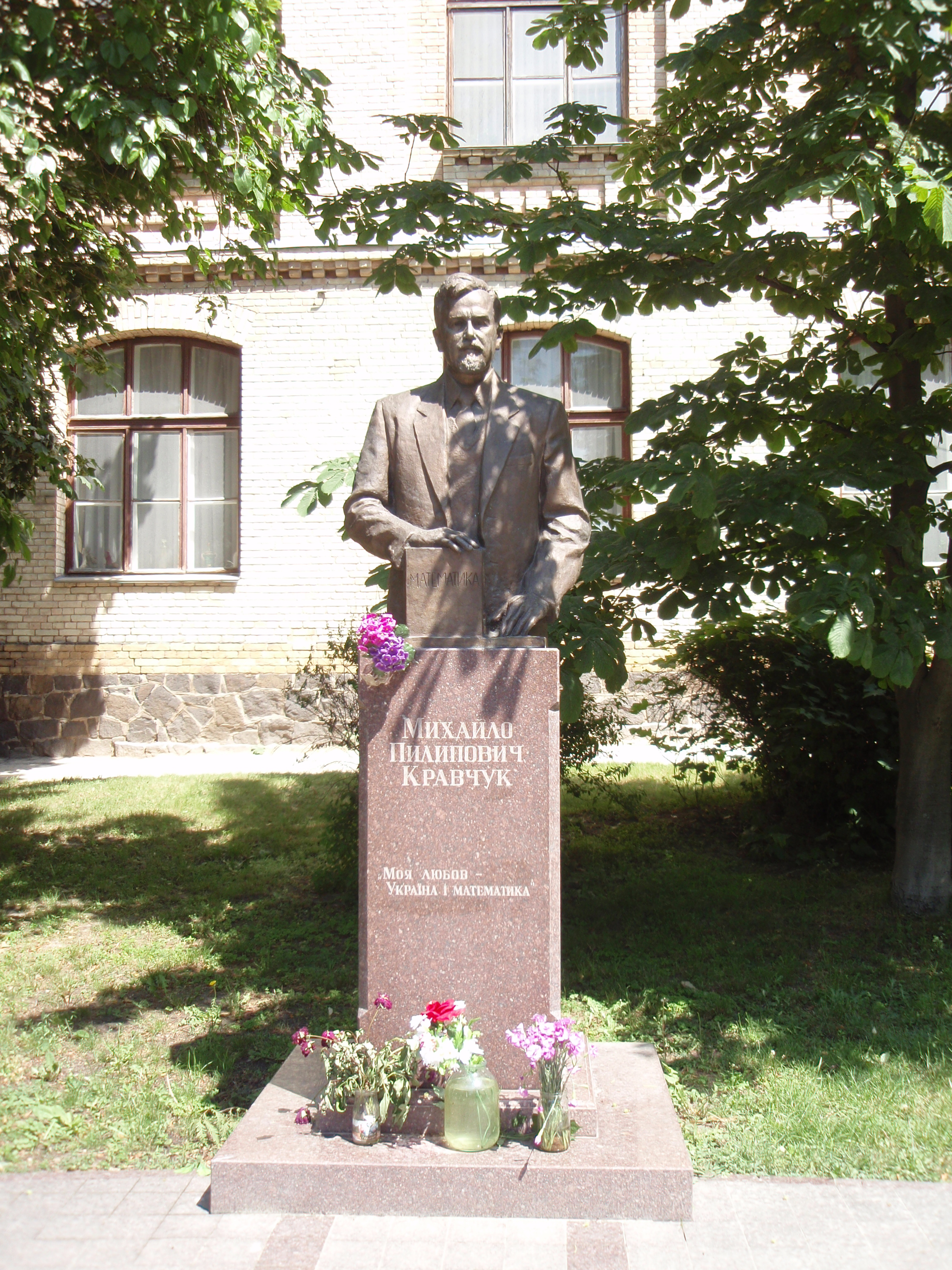
Monument to Mykhailo Kravchuk at KPI

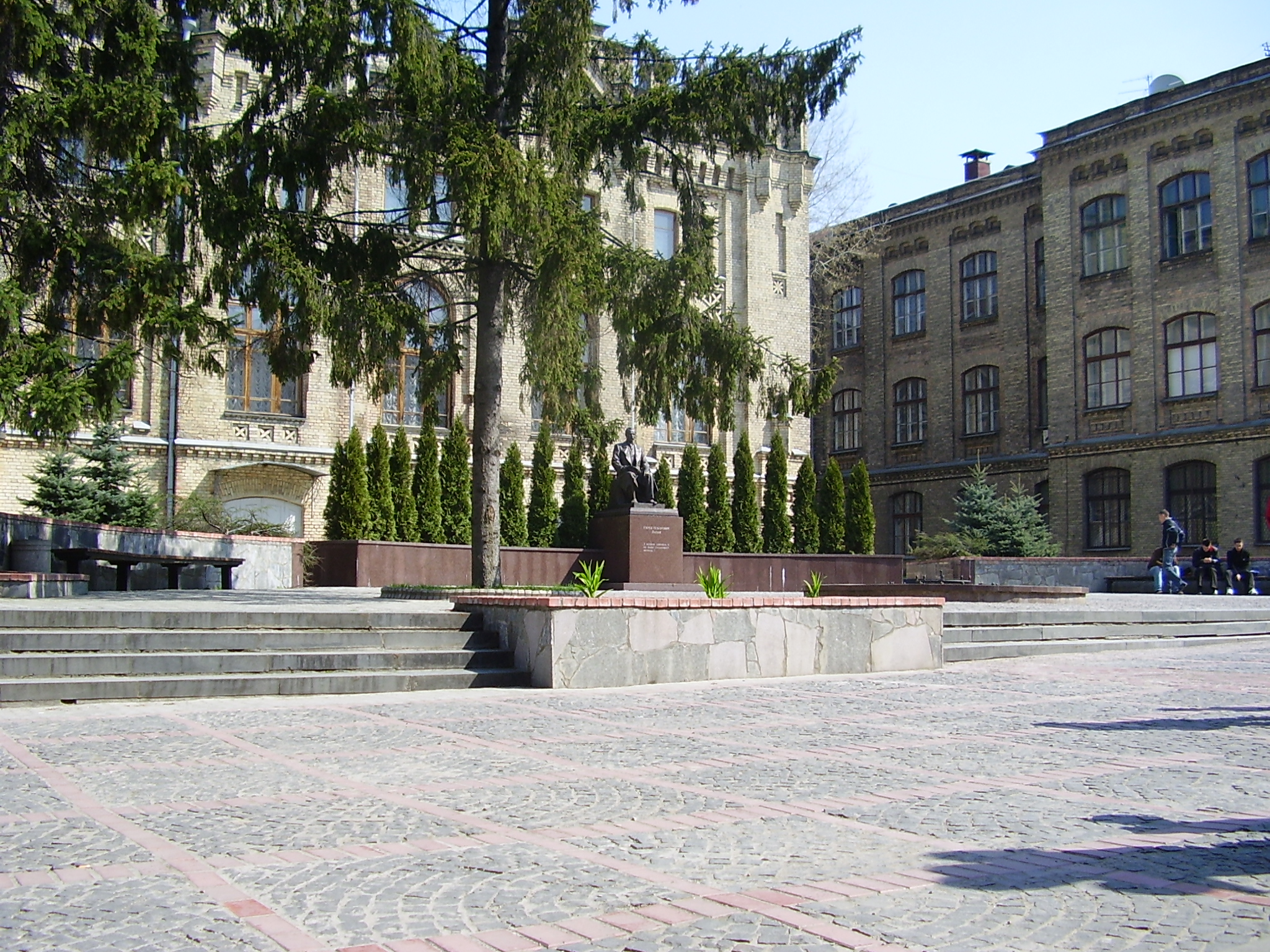
Monument to Paton

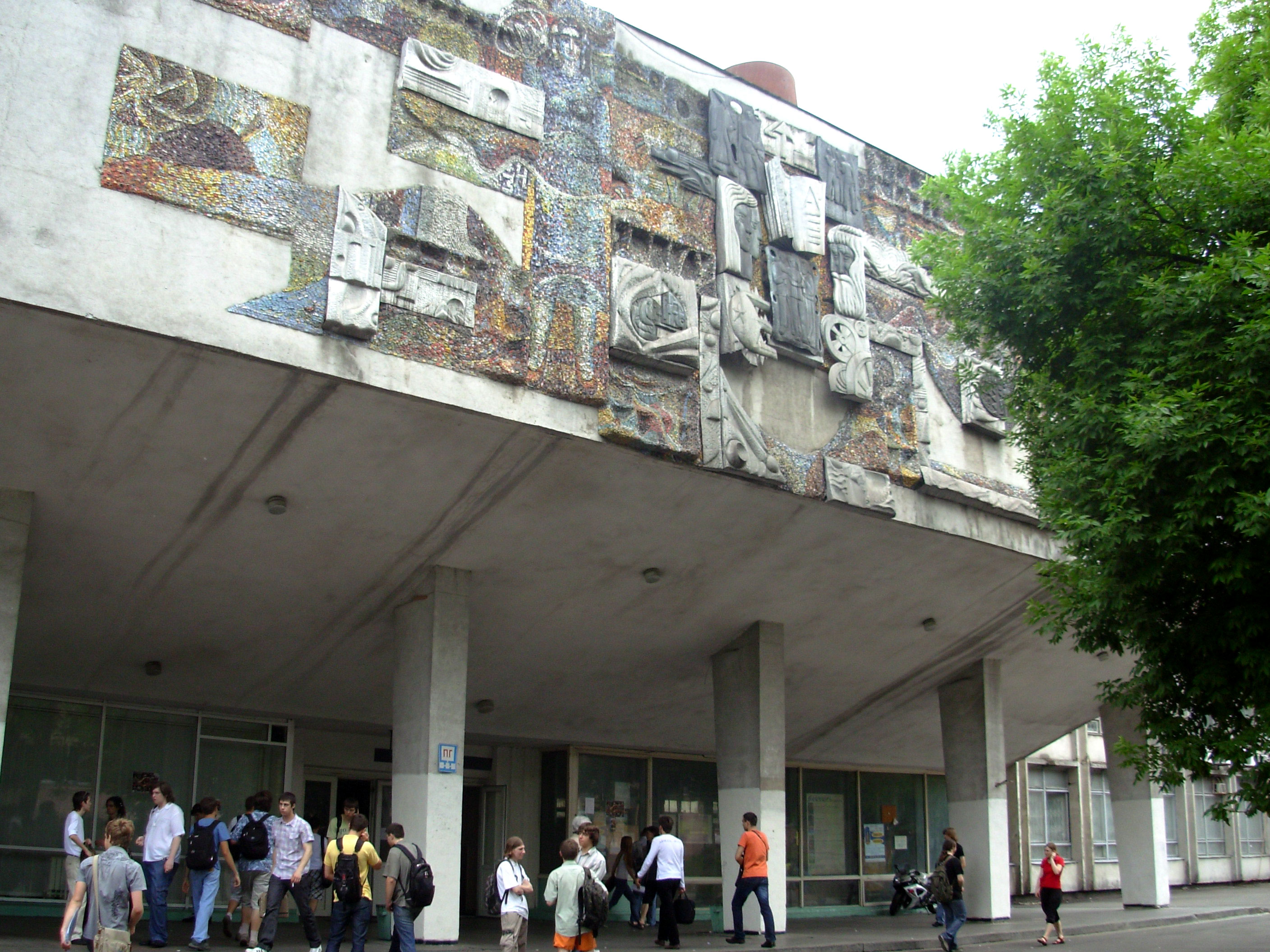
Building 18, information technology and computing devices

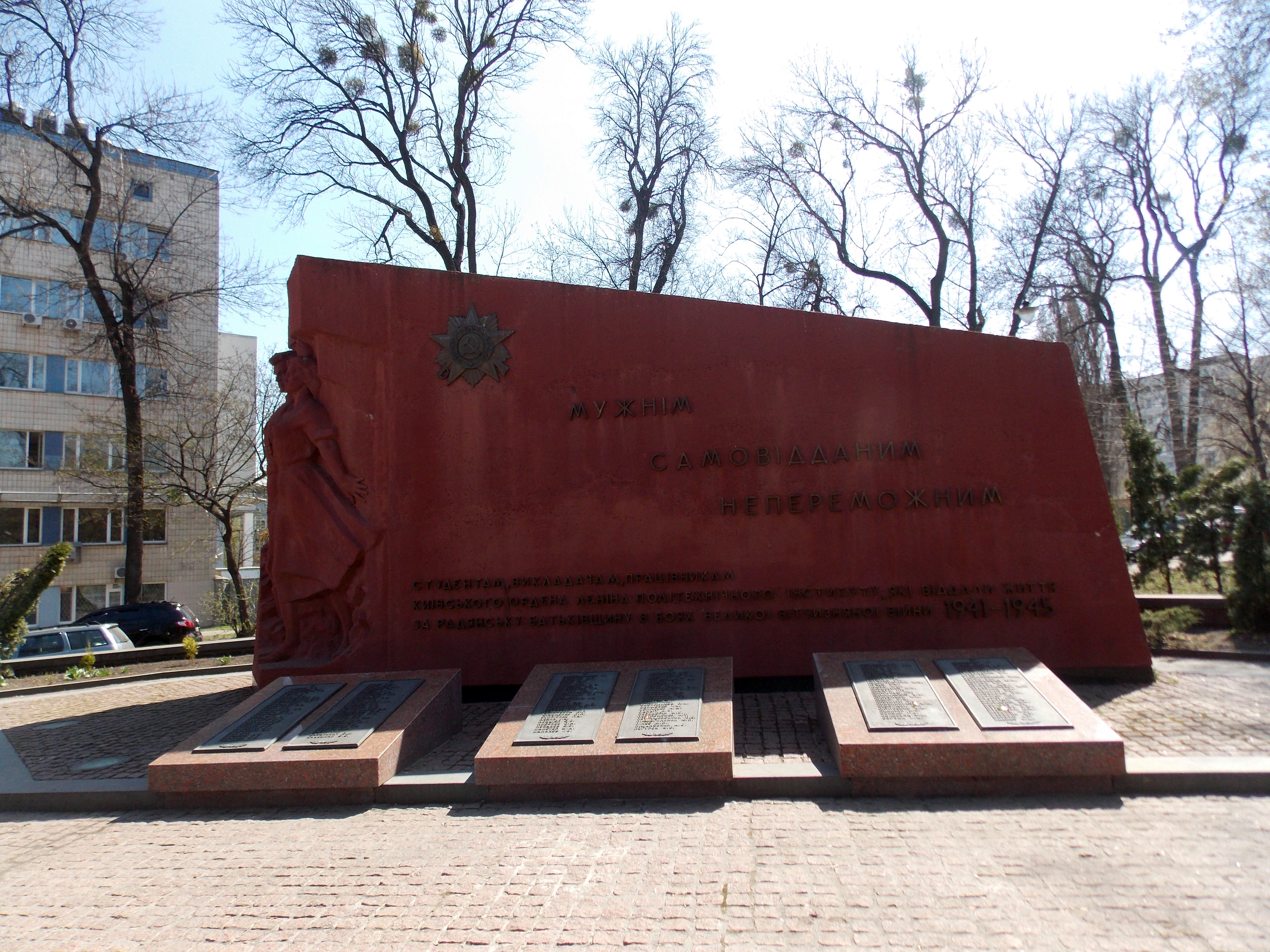
Monument to Soviet soldiers that perished in World War II

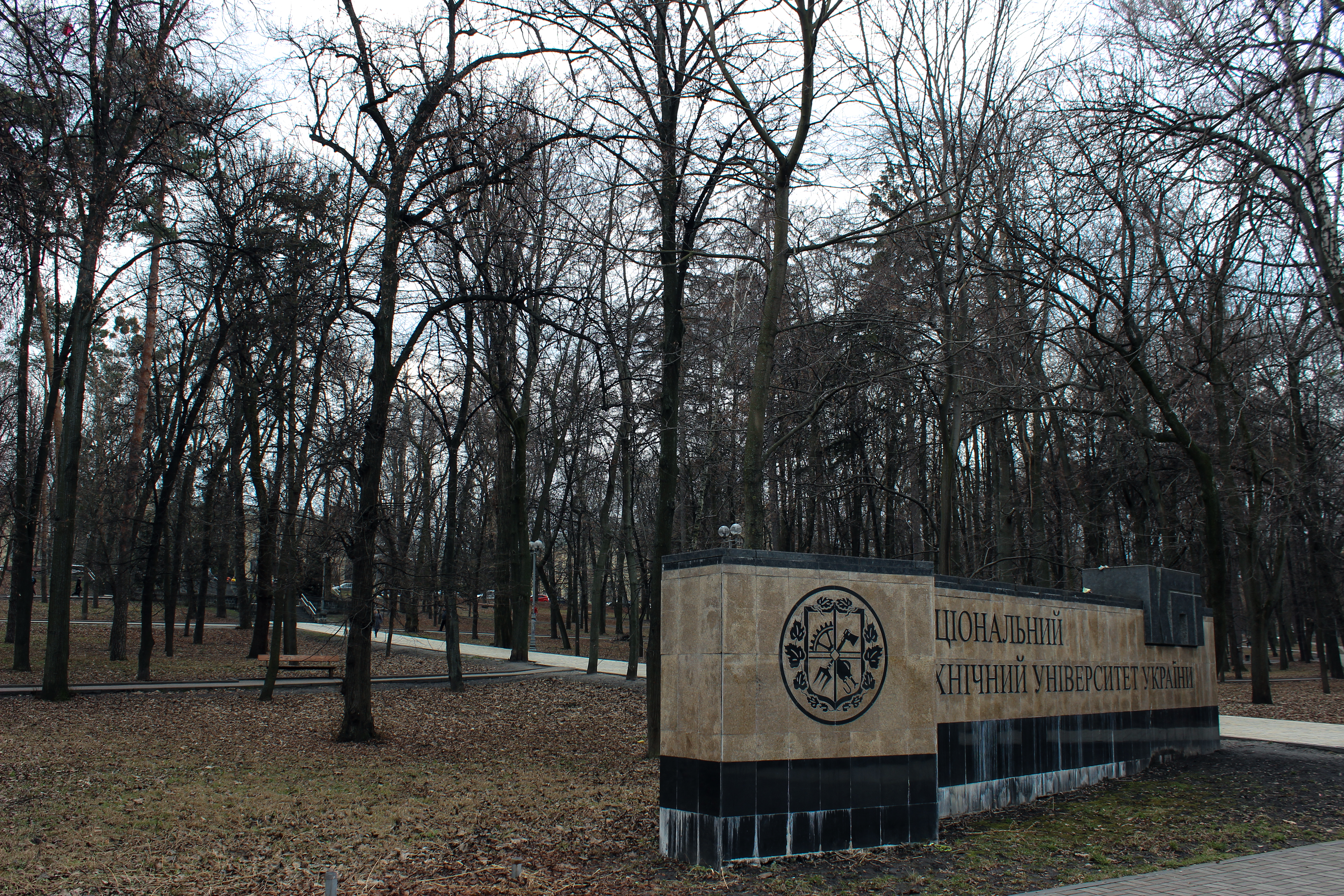
KPI park

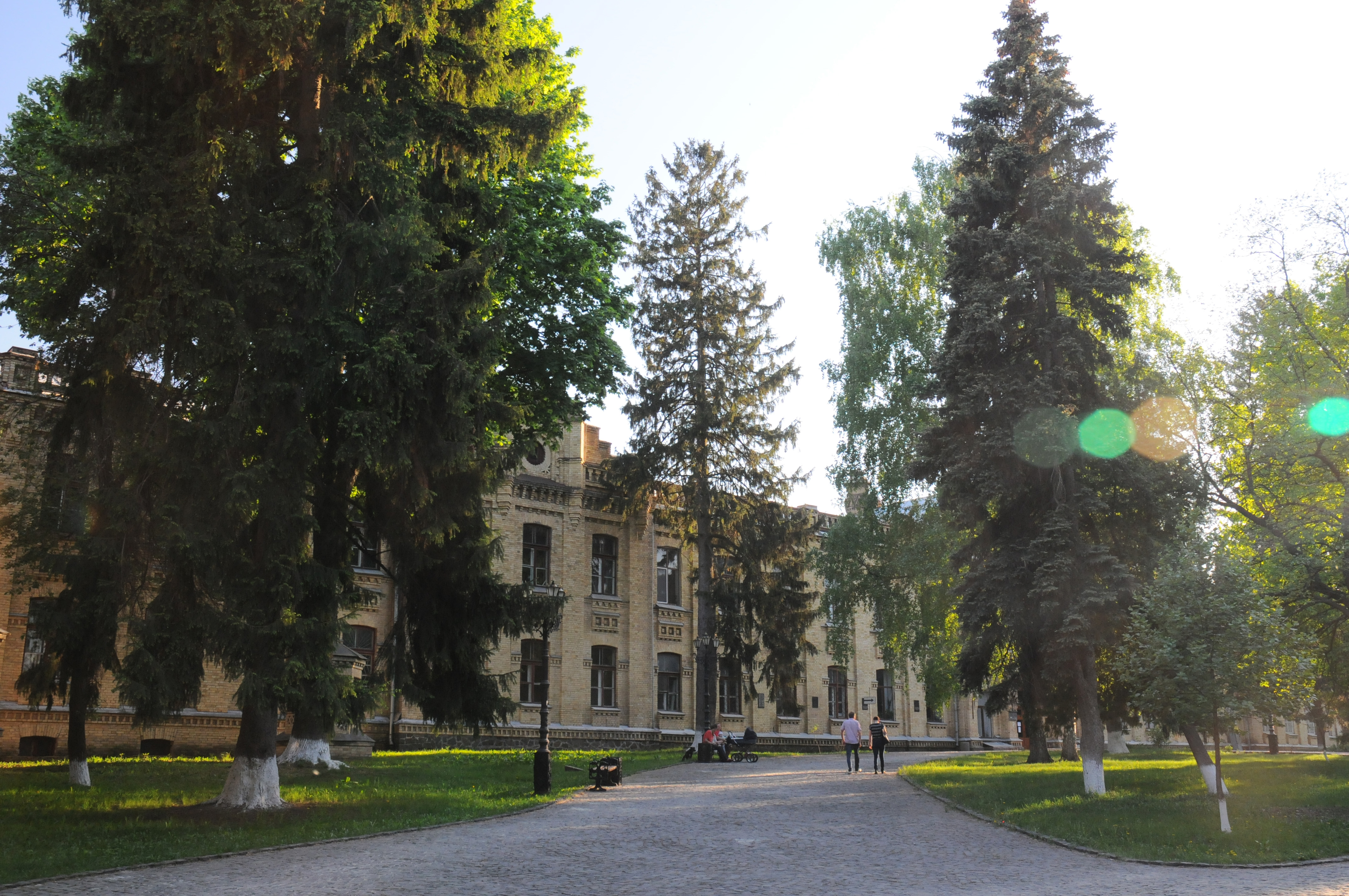
KPI dormitory building 1

The institute also considers organized leisure a very important factor in bringing up young specialists.

The Knowledge Square is the centre of the entire KPI complex, measuring approx. 105 x 100 meters. The Knowledge Square is connected to one of the city's main thoroughfare, Prospect Peremohy (Victory Avenue). Meetings, festivals, and graduation ceremonies take place at the square.

The university also has an assembly hall with 1,750 seats. It was opened in August 1984.

Various sport facilities also exist at the institute. There are training grounds, soccer fields, volleyball and basketball courts for student use. There are many nationally rated athletes among the students of this institute.

Some Institutes were organized on the KPI basis. Among them are: the Civil Engineering Institute, Technological Institute of Light and Food Industry, the Institute of Civil Aviation, Automobile and Road Building Institute, Agricultural (now Agricultural Academy) and others. In 1934–1944 the KPI was called an Industrial Institute.

=== Other labs and organisations ===
- Scientific Society of Students and Post-graduates
- Scientific-industrial laboratory DIDAKTIK
- UNESCO Chair in Higher Technical Education, Applied System Analysis and Informatics
- State Polytechnic Museum
- University Interclub
- University Library

=== Summer school ===
The Summer school Achievements and Applications of Contemporary Informatics, Mathematics and Physics (Summer School AACIMP) is an annual international scientific-educational project of volunteers from the university's Student Science Association. It is aimed at an international audience of advanced students, postgraduates and young scientists. There are usually about 100 participants.

It has been traditionally held each August since 2006. As a rule, the duration of the project is two weeks.

== Related educational establishments ==
Numerous educational establishments, such as the Dnipro Institute of Infrastructure and Transport, Odesa National Maritime University, Kyiv National University of Construction and Architecture, National Aviation University, National University of Life and Environmental Sciences of Ukraine, National Transport University, Kyiv National University of Technologies and Design, Vinnytsia National Technical University and several institutes of the National Academy of Sciences of Ukraine were created on the basis of KPI.

== Community ==
=== Student life ===
At present the number of students at KPI is more than 36,000. Approximately 400 of them are international students. In this way students, especially those who live in a hostel, have a social life with their foreign fellow students and a chance to learn more about other cultures, people and ideas. Over 4,500 students graduate from KPI every year. The diploma is accepted by the European Union. KPI has a preparatory department for foreigners. There is a possibility to study in English and at the same time learn Ukrainian.

Full-time students attend the school for 5 years and 6 months; part-time – 5 years and 10 months.

The school offers 68 majors and 70 minors at its 3 branches. There are 16 departments and a college, including the following:

- Department of Informatics and Computer Engineering that offer courses on Electron Instrument Engineering, Cybernetics, and Control engineering and Computer engineering, among others.
- Electric Power Engineering Automation department that offers courses Electrical Networks and Electric Systems, Central Power Plants, High Voltage Technique, and Cybernetics of Electrical Systems.
- Electro-Acoustic Faculty offering courses in Hydroacoustics Sound Recording, Measuring Techniques, and Microprocessors.
- Faculty of Radioengineering
- Physical engineering department offering courses on Metallurgy, Metals and Alloys, Powder Metallurgy, and others.

=== Faculty and Academician community ===
About 70% of KPI teachers have scientific degrees. Among them there are Academicians and Corresponding Members of the Ukrainian Academy of Sciences, Professors, and Merited Scientists. The language of instruction is predominantly Ukrainian, with options of Russian and English also available.

A number of the university's rectors served as ministers of education, including former rector Mykhailo Zghurovskyi.

The UNESCO CEPES (European Centre for Higher Education) ranked Kyiv Polytechnic Institute as the best university in Ukraine.

== Recreation at KPI ==
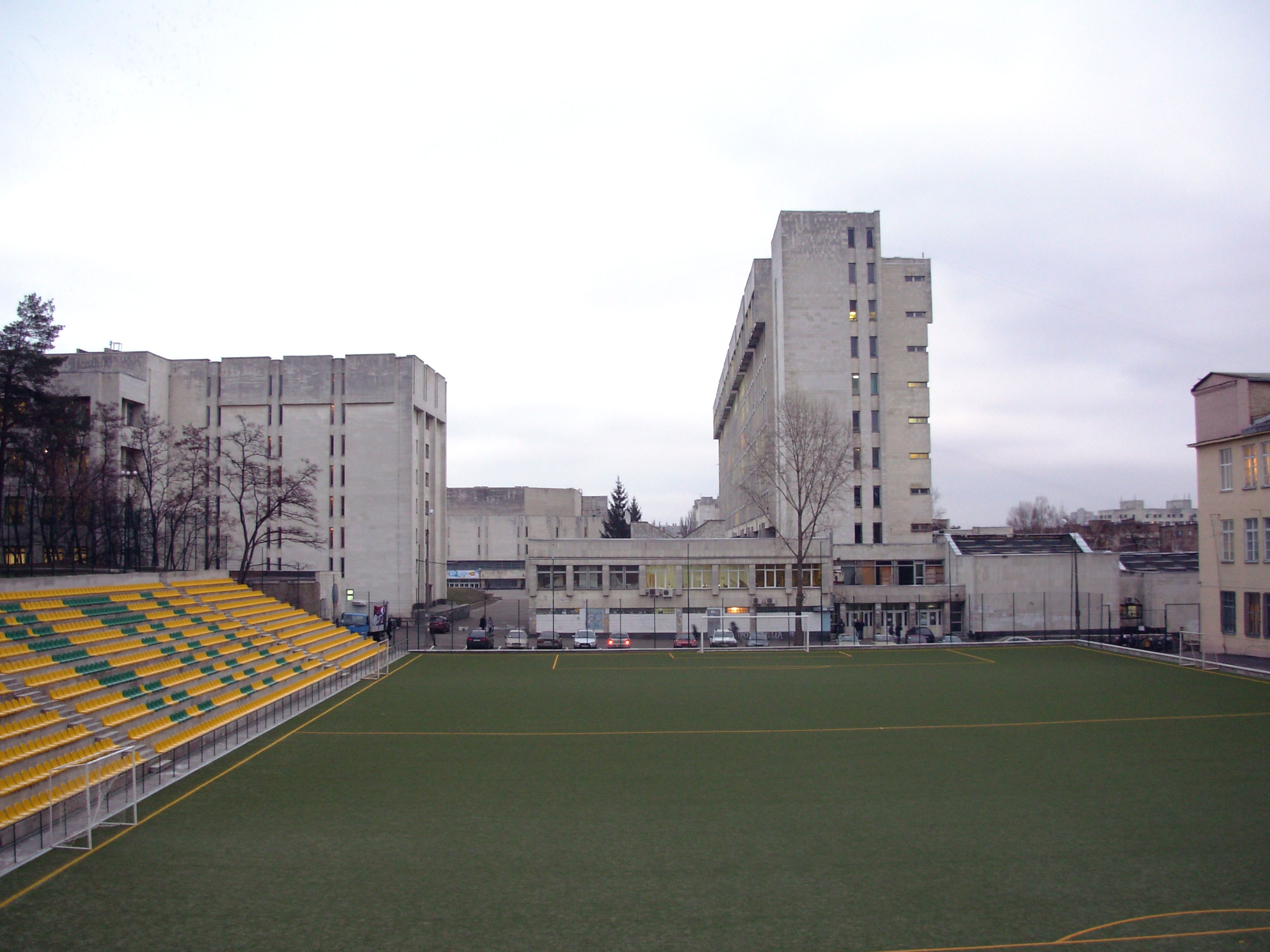
Soccer field

The university has a well developed infrastructure of recreation and leisure, including sports, entertainment, arts, and others.

The university has a sports complex with an indoor swimming pool, a multi-hall building, and a soccer field.

The Kyiv Polytechnic Institute has been an important center of sports life in the city. Its football team "Politechniki" was one of the first football teams founded in the Russian Empire in 1906–1917.

The university has several recreational resorts throughout the country. Two resorts are located near Kyiv, one is located in Carpathian Mountains, and another near the Black Sea.

The university has its own arts center located in Center of Culture and Arts, better known by its Soviet standard name "Palace of Culture". The concert hall of KPI Center Culture and Arts is the main venue of the Ukrainian national qualification for continental song contest Eurovision.

There is a park in the grounds of the university.

== International relations ==
The Kyiv Polytechnic Institute has foreign economic relationship with 45 foreign partners from 12 countries of the world. 29 agreements and 17 contracts have been concluded and 77 protocols have been signed: KPI received the certificate as a participant of foreign economic relationship.

The most active international scientific and technological cooperation is carried out by the chairs of the institute with the partners from Poland, Germany, Bulgaria, Denmark and Lebanon. Lately the relationship with China, United States, Italy, Vietnam and Spain have become more active. The institute carries out the exchange of students according to the agreement on cooperation with the University of Oregon, United States.

KPI was the first university of Ukraine that joined the community of the European Universities, and signed the Magna Charta Universitatum in September 2003.

=== Friendly schools ===
Selected Co-operations

- University of Klagenfurt (Austria)
- University of Antwerp (Belgium)
- Anhui University of Technology (China)
- Otto von Guericke University of Magdeburg (Germany)
- University of Miskolc (Hungary)
- University of Manchester (United Kingdom)
- Iowa State University (United States)
- University of Oregon (United States)
- University of Wisconsin-Madison (United States)

== Rectors ==
During its history the university has been headed by 23 rectors:

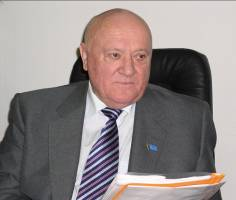
Petro Talanchuk

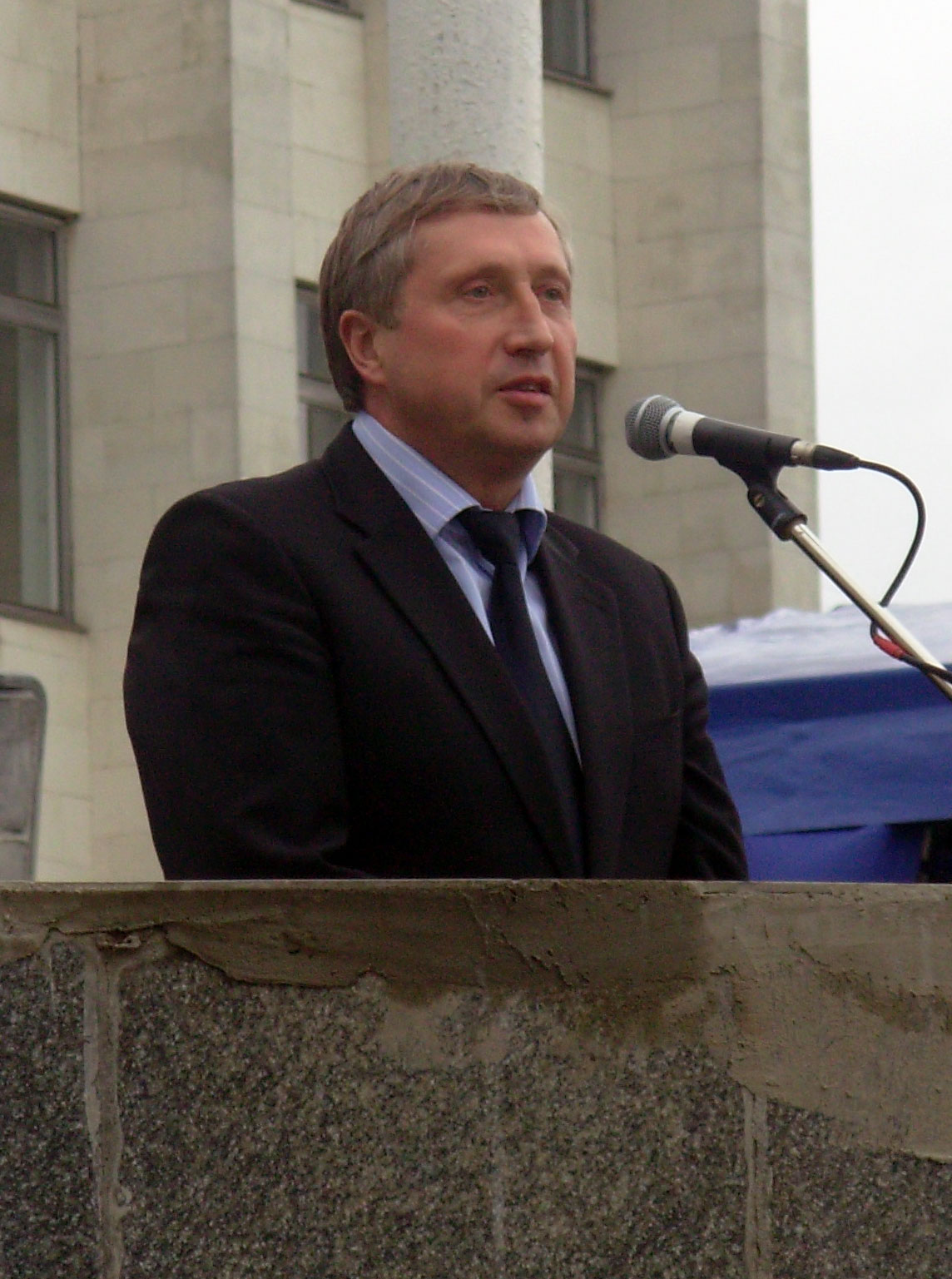
Mykhailo Zghurovskyi

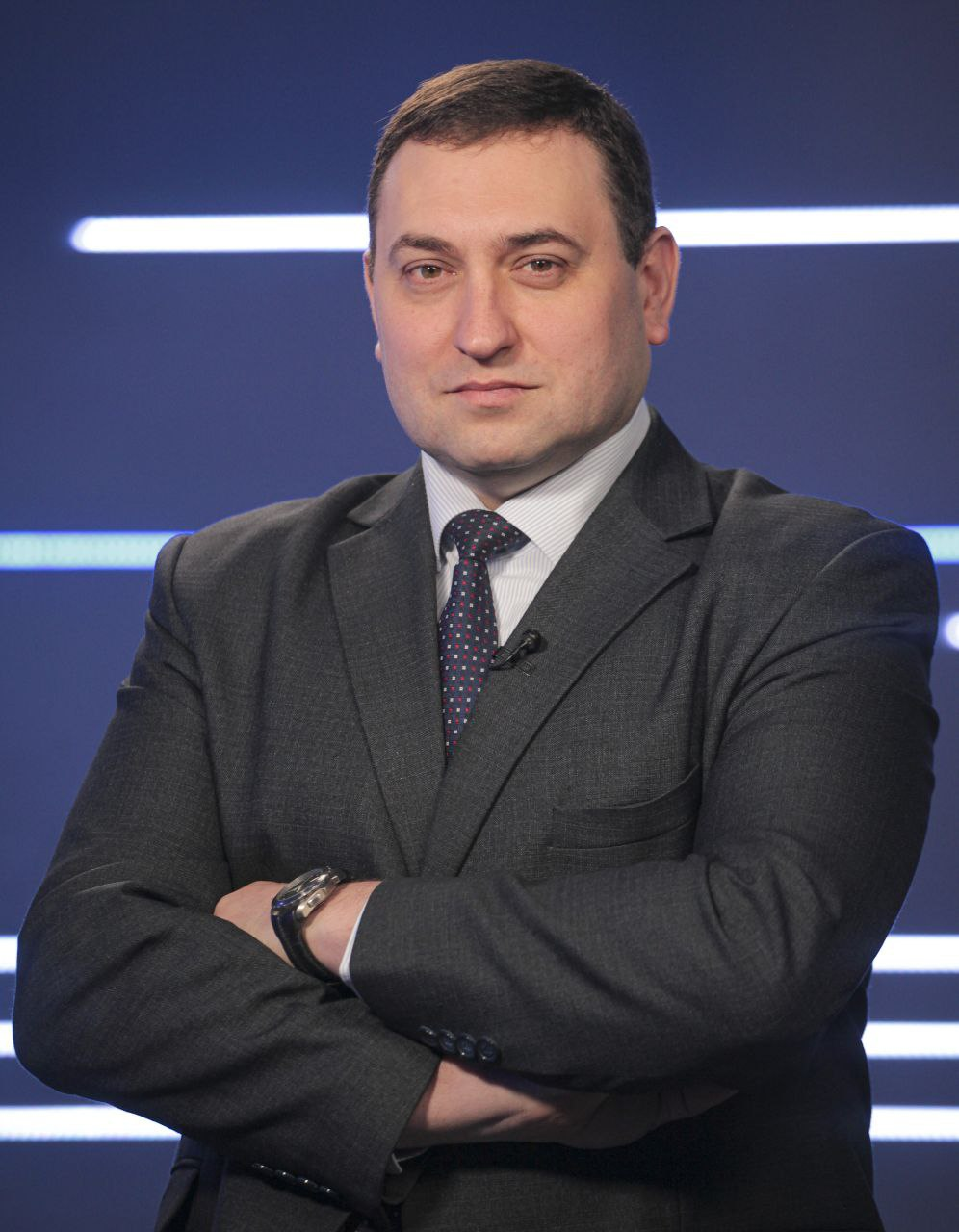
Anatolii Melnychenko

- 1898–1902 Viktor Kirpichov
- 1902–1904 Mikhail Konovalov
- 1904–1905 Konstantin Zvorykin
- 1905–1906 Mykola Chyrvynskyi
- 1906–1908 Volodymyr Tymofeyev
- 1908–1911 Konstantin Dementiev
- 1911–1917 Ivan Zhukov
- 1917–1919 Petro Yerchenko
- 1919–1920 George De Metz
- 1920–1921 Serhiy Veselovskyi
- 1921–1921 Ivan Kukharenko
- 1921–1929 Viktorin Bobrov
- 1929–1930 Dmitriy Melnikov
- 1930–1934 unknown
- 1934–1936 Mykola Yefimov
- 1936–1937 Pavlo Zhykharev
- 1937–1941 Mykola Shpylko
- 1941–1942 Mykola Velychkivskyi
- 1942–1944 unknown
- 1944–1952 Oleksandr Plyhunov
- 1952–1955 Vitaliy Gridnyev
- 1955–1955 Ivan Shvets
- 1955–1971 Oleksandr Plyhunov
- 1971–1987 Hryhoriy Denysenko
- 1987–1992 Petro Talanchuk
- 1992–2024 Mykhailo Zghurovskyi
- 2024–present Anatolii Melnychenko

== Rankings ==
University rankings

Global – Overall
- QS World: 701-750 (2021)

University rankings

Regional – Overall
- QS Emerging Europe and Central Asia: 63 (2022)

National Technical University of Ukraine "Kyiv Polytechnic Institute" positions in national and international ratings of the best Ukrainian educational institutions, employers ratings, etc.:

- Ukrainian university academic rating "TOP – 200 Ukraine" (2022)- 2nd place.
- Ukrainian employers rating "Compass" - 1st place.
- World universities ranking "Webometrics" – 713th place (2012), 510th (2013), 1538th (2022)
- QS World University Ranking – 701+

== Notable alumni ==
- Ivan Bardin, metallurgist
- Saadoun Brahim, joined the Ukrainian Armed Forces as a fighter-volunteer
- Boris Yakovlevich Bukreev, mathematician known for his works in complex functions, differential equations, and non-Euclidean geometry
- Vladimir Chelomei, Soviet mechanics scientist and rocket engineer
- Valeriia Hontareva, Chairman of the National Bank of Ukraine
- Mikhail Konovalov, chemist
- Sergey Korolyov, rocket scientist
- Arkhip Lyulka, USSR's premier designer of jet engines
- Aleksandr Mikulin, Soviet aircraft engine designer and chief designer in the Mikulin OKB
- Nadiia Omelchenko, entrepreneur, and Vice President of the IT-Integrator company
- Evgeny O. Paton, inventor of electric welding
- Viktor Pylypenko, soldier, translator, and gay activist
- Isaak Sigal, scientist
- Alexander Y. Tetelbaum, computer scientist and inventor who also established the International Solomon University
- Stephen Timoshenko, reputed to be the father of modern engineering mechanics
- Oleg Tozoni, the head of the Department of Electrodynamics at the Cybernetics Institute of the Academy of Science
- Yury Gogotsi, professor of materials science at Drexel University and co-discoverer of MXenes
- Karlis Zalts, mathematician

== Scientific journals ==
- Radioelectronics and Communications Systems
- System Research and Information Technologies
- KPI Science News (Naukovi visti NTUU KPI)
- Visnyk NTUU KPI: Informatics, operation and computer science

== See also ==
- List of universities in Ukraine
