= Victoria Museum (Kyiv) =

Museum of Ukraine

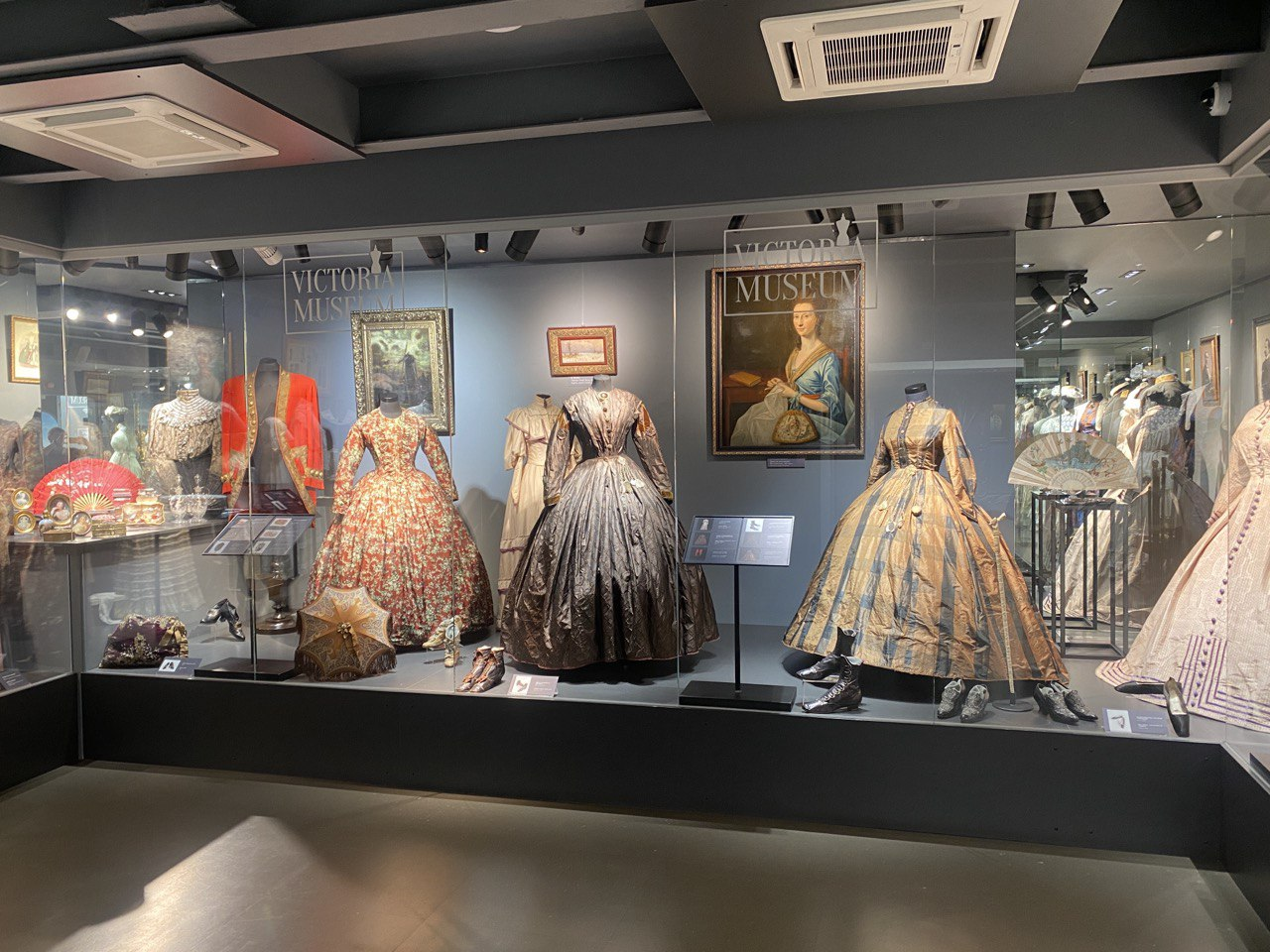
- Established: May 30, 2017
- Location: Ukraine, Kyiv
- Coordinates: 50.4401°N 30.5483°E
- Founder: Victoria Lysenko
- Curator: Victoria Lysenko
- Website: victoriamuseum.com.ua

Victoria Museum is a museum of historical costume and style in Kyiv, dedicated to the urban European fashion of the Victorian era (1850–1920). It is the first costume and style museum in Ukraine. It is equipped with the most modern requirements. A museum has a climate control system and solar filtration.

== History ==
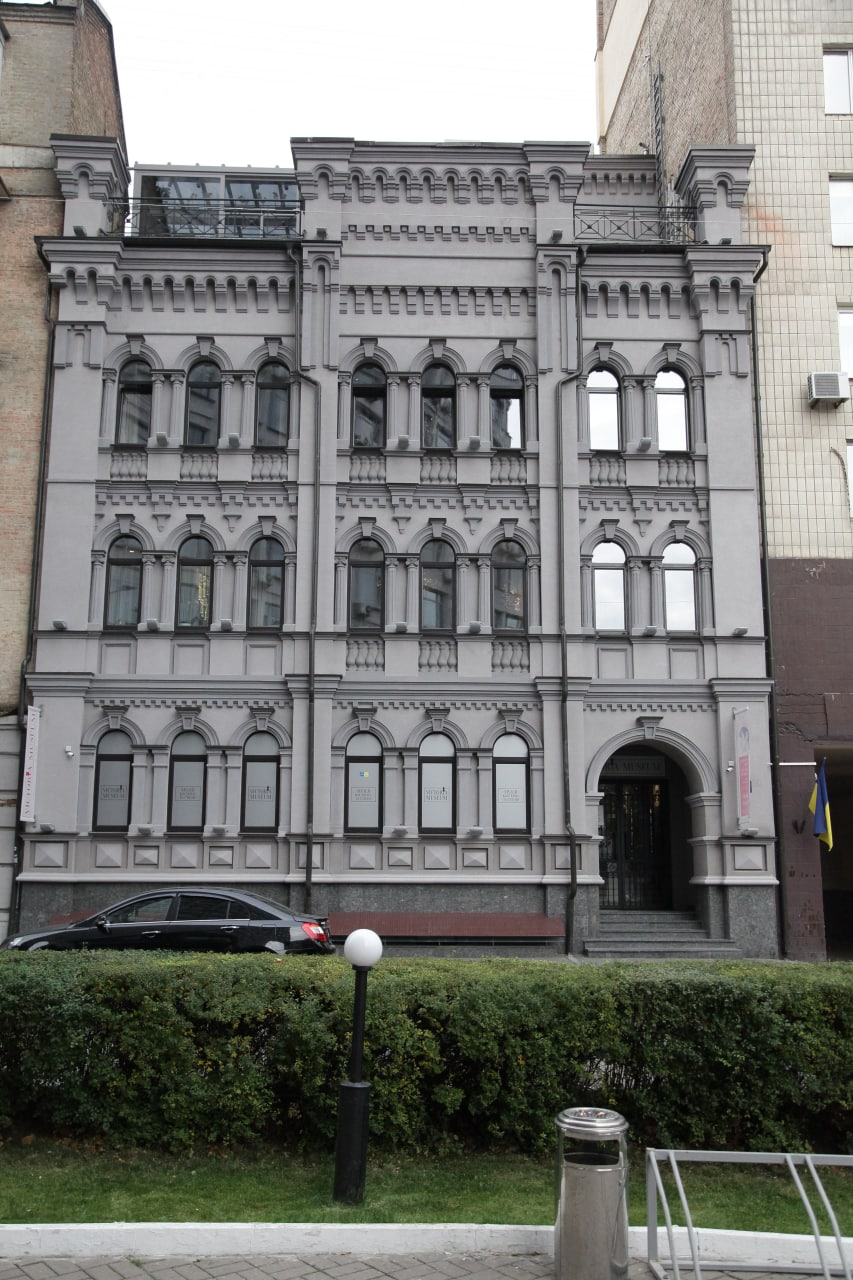
Victoria Museum

The museum is located in a historic mansion in Kyiv, built in the late 19th century. The building has been in disrepair since 2000. In 2009, the mansion was extensively restored and strengthened. Balcony railings on the 2nd and 3rd floors have been preserved in their original form.

According to the founder of the museum, Victoria Lysenko, preparations for the opening lasted 9 months. In particular, Victoria Lysenko had an internship at British museums.

On May 30, 2017 "Victoria Museum" was opened.

The museum has 7 showrooms located on two floors. Its hallmark is a brown dress from the Victorian era, which is over 150 years old.

On July 20, 2017, the presentation of the "Victoria Museum" for business travel and meeting industry professionals was organized by the Business Tourism Association of Ukraine.

=== Exhibitions ===
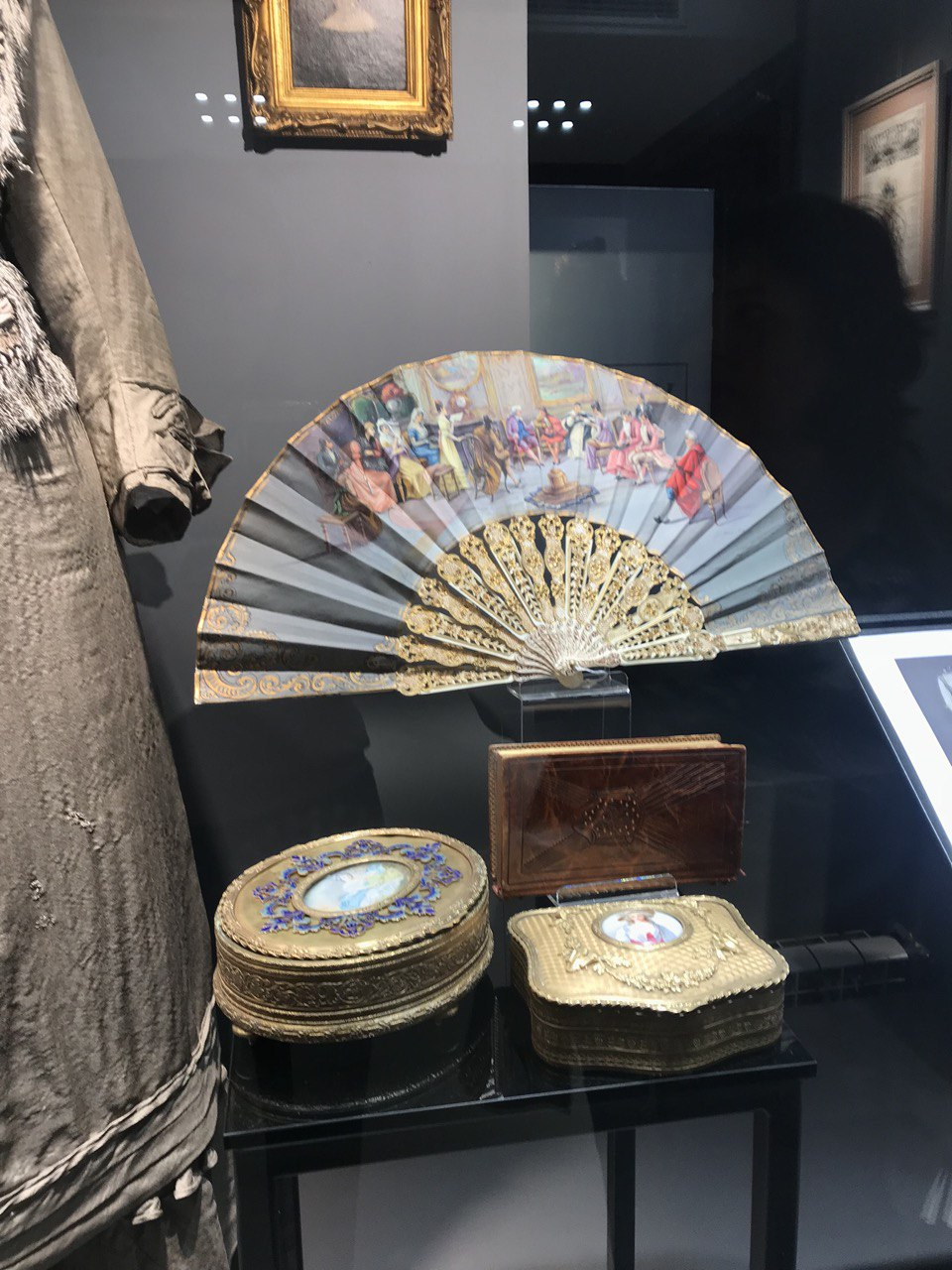
Hands fan

2017: "Metropolitan Fashion of the 18th–19th Centuries: Cinema and Artifacts". The premiere exhibition, which brought together in one space the costumes and dresses worn by fashionistas of times gone by.

2018: "Zeitgeist, spirit of luxury". The ball is ruled by accessories: handbags, gloves, canes. The little things that set the style.

2019: "Modest luxury of a bygone era". Magic Jewelers – Jewelry worn by women in the 19th and early 20th century.

2019: "Hand fan is open to dialogue". The museum has the largest collection of fans in Ukraine – more than 80 unique items.

2019: "Signs of the male brotherhood". Collection of badges of the most mysterious order in the world.

2019: "The holiday is coming! Vintage that inspires". New Year's toys in dresses of the most famous fashion houses.

2020: Arcana of Women's Fate. The whole palette of tenderness and strength: the faces of women of the 19th century through the eyes of artists.

2020: Coral Chic. Coral jewelry is the frozen beauty of the oceans.

2020: "Aesthetics in the details". The main male gadget of the past is canes and their secrets.

2020: "Lesya Ukrainka is a knight of the Belle Epoque". According to Victoria Lysenko, with this exhibition she wanted to "show the great poetess not in granite, but alive, real, feminine".

2021: "Love and nature: an exquisite elixir of health." The exhibition is dedicated to plot fans.

2021: "Talk about a doll". Once they were toys – dolls. Today, they have become unique artifacts of the bygone past.

The museum season of 2022 was opened with the exhibition "Vial Paradise". It was the only exhibition of various viales from the 19th century. The war unleashed by Russia against Ukraine suspended the work of the museum for some time. However, on the 45th day of hostilities, Victoria Lysenko again opened the doors of the Victoria Museum to visitors, so that people have the opportunity "even in such a terrible time to treat souls with beauty and realness."

In May 2022, at the European Museum Forum, Victoria Museum was presented in the nomination European Museum of the Year Award (EMYA).

== Collection ==
Today, the museum's collection includes more than 1,500 exhibits and 200 authentic costumes.

The museum holds themed workshops for adults and children, lectures, excursions (individual and group), quests, cultural evenings, various events and presentations, photo shoots (there are two photo zones). Also, for the convenience of visitors, an audio guide is provided in 4 languages (Ukrainian, Russian, English and Chinese).
