= International sanctions during the Russo-Ukrainian war =

International sanctions have been imposed against Russia and Crimea during the Russo-Ukrainian War by a large number of countries, including the United States, Canada, the European Union, and international organisations following the Russian annexation of Crimea, which began in late February 2014. Belarus has also been sanctioned for its cooperation with and assistance to Russian armed forces. The sanctions were imposed against individuals, businesses, and officials from Russia and Ukraine. Russia responded with sanctions against several countries, including a total ban on food imports from Australia, Canada, Norway, Japan, the United States, the EU and the United Kingdom.

The sanctions contributed to the reduction in value of the Russian ruble and worsened the economic impact of the 2022 Russian invasion of Ukraine. They also caused economic damage to the EU economy, with total losses estimated at €100 billion (as of 2015). As of 2014, Russia's finance minister announced that the sanctions had cost Russia $40 billion, with another $100 billion loss in 2014 due to decrease in the price of oil the same year. Following sanctions imposed in August 2018, economic losses incurred by Russia amounted to around 0.5–1.5% in foregone GDP growth.

As of June 2023, sanctions by the European Union and United States continue to be in effect. In January 2022, the EU announced the latest extension of sanctions until 31 July 2022. Following Russia's invasion of Ukraine in February 2022, the United States, the EU, and other countries introduced or significantly expanded sanctions to include Vladimir Putin and other government officials. They also cut off selected Russian banks from SWIFT. The 2022 boycott of Russia and Belarus triggered the 2022 Russian financial crisis.

== Background ==
Before the annexation of Crimea and the War in Donbas, tensions already existed between Russia and the United States over human rights issues. In December 2012, the U.S. enacted the Magnitsky Act, intended to punish Russian officials responsible for the death of Russian tax accountant Sergei Magnitsky in a Moscow prison in 2009 by prohibiting their entry to the US and use of its banking system and also to grant permanent normal trade relations status to Russia. 18 individuals were originally affected by the Act. In December 2016, Congress enacted the Global Magnitsky Act to allow the US Government to sanction foreign government officials implicated in human rights abuses anywhere in the world. On 21 December 2017, 13 additional names were added to the list of sanctioned individuals, not just Russians. Other countries passed similar laws to ban foreigners deemed guilty of human rights abuses from entering their countries.

In response to the annexation of Crimea by the Russian Federation and the 2022 Russian invasion of Ukraine, some governments and international organisations, led by the United States and European Union, imposed sanctions on Russian individuals and businesses. As the unrest expanded into other parts of Eastern Ukraine, and later escalated into the War in Donbas, the scope of the sanctions increased.

Overall, three types of sanctions were imposed: ban on provision of technology for oil and gas exploration, ban on provision of credits to Russian oil companies and state banks, travel restrictions on the influential Russian citizens close to President Putin and involved in the annexation of Crimea. The Russian government responded in kind, with sanctions against some Canadian and American individuals and, in August 2014, with a total ban on food imports from the European Union, United States, Norway, Canada and Australia.

As of December 2023, the Russian nuclear industry remained exempt from sanctions and the national nuclear company Rosatom remained the largest actor in the international market for nuclear reactor construction (also playing key roles in nuclear fuel supplies, nuclear equipment supplies, and handling nuclear waste).

On 23 February 2024, the U.S. imposed trade restrictions on 93 entities for their assistance to Russia's war effort in Ukraine, including 63 from Russia, 16 from Turkey, 8 from China and 4 from the UАЕ. The UАЕ-based Crynofist Aviation was also targeted, which provides spare parts for airplanes. Additionally, the U.S. imposed more than 500 sanctions on Moscow and its accomplices for funding the war and for the death of Russian opposition leader Alexei Navalny.

== Sanctions against Russian and Ukrainian individuals, companies and officials ==
Sanctioned individuals include notable and high-level central government personnel and businessmen on all sides. In addition, companies suggested for possible involvement in the controversial issues have also been sanctioned.

=== First round: March/April 2014 ===
On 6 March 2014, U.S. president Barack Obama, invoking, inter alia, the International Emergency Economic Powers Act and the National Emergencies Act, signed an executive order declaring a national emergency and ordering sanctions, including travel bans and the freezing of U.S. assets, against not-yet-specified individuals who had "asserted governmental authority in the Crimean region without the authorization of the Government of Ukraine" and whose actions were found, inter alia, to "undermine democratic processes and institutions in Ukraine".

On 17 March 2014, the United States, the European Union, and Canada introduced specifically targeted sanctions, the day after the disputed Crimean referendum and a few hours before Russian president Vladimir Putin signed a decree recognizing Crimea as an independent state, laying the groundwork for the annexation of Crimea by Russia. The principal EU sanction aimed to "prevent the entry into ... their territories of the natural persons responsible for actions which undermine ... the territorial integrity ... of Ukraine, and of natural persons associated with them, as listed in the Annex". The EU imposed its sanctions "in the absence of de-escalatory steps by the Russian Federation" in order to bring an end to the violence in eastern Ukraine. The EU at the same time clarified that the union "remains ready to reverse its decisions and reengage with Russia when it starts contributing actively and without ambiguities to finding a solution to the Ukrainian crisis".

These 17 March sanctions were the most wide-ranging sanctions used against Russia since the 1991 fall of the Soviet Union. Japan also announced sanctions against Russia, which included the suspension of talks regarding military matters, space, investment, and visa requirements. A few days later, the US government expanded the sanctions.

On 19 March, Australia imposed sanctions against Russia after its annexation of Crimea. These sanctions targeted financial dealings and travel bans on those who have been instrumental in the Russian threat to Ukraine's sovereignty. Australian sanctions were expanded on 21 May.

In early April, Albania, Iceland and Montenegro, as well as Ukraine, imposed the same restrictions and travel bans as those of the EU on 17 March. Igor Lukšić, foreign minister of Montenegro, said that despite a "centuries old-tradition" of good ties with Russia, joining the EU in imposing sanctions had "always been the only reasonable choice". Slightly earlier in March, Moldova imposed the same sanctions against former president of Ukraine Viktor Yanukovych and a number of former Ukrainian officials, as announced by the EU on 5 March.

In response to the sanctions introduced by the United States and the European Union, the State Duma (Lower House of the Russian parliament) unanimously passed a resolution asking for all members of the Duma be included on the sanctions list. The sanctions were expanded to include prominent Russian businessmen and women a few days later.

=== Second round: April 2014 ===
On 10 April, the Council of Europe suspended the voting rights of Russia's delegation.

On 28 April, the United States imposed a ban on business transactions within its territory on seven Russian officials, including Igor Sechin, executive chairman of the Russian state oil company Rosneft, and 17 Russian companies.

On the same day, the EU issued travel bans against a further 15 individuals. The EU also stated the aims of EU sanctions as:

sanctions are not punitive, but designed to bring about a change in policy or activity by the target country, entities or individuals. Measures are therefore always targeted at such policies or activities, the means to conduct them and those responsible for them. At the same time, the EU makes every effort to minimise adverse consequences for the civilian population or for legitimate activities.

=== Third round: 2014–2021 ===
==== 2014 ====
In response to the escalating War in Donbass, on 16 July 2014 the United States extended its transactions ban to two major Russian energy firms, Rosneft and Novatek, and to two banks, Gazprombank and Vnesheconombank. United States also urged EU leaders to join the third wave leading EU to start drafting European sanctions a day before. On 25 July, the EU officially expanded its sanctions to an additional 15 individuals and 18 entities, with an additional eight added on 30 July. On 31 July 2014 the EU introduced the third round of sanctions which included an embargo on arms and related material, and embargo on dual-use goods and technology intended for military use or a military end user, a ban on imports of arms and related material, controls on export of equipment for the oil industry, and a restriction on the issuance of and trade in certain bonds, equity or similar financial instruments on a maturity greater than 90 days (In September 2014 lowered to 30 days)

On 24 July 2014, Canada targeted Russian arms, energy and financial entities. On 5 August 2014, Japan froze the assets of "individuals and groups supporting the separation of Crimea from Ukraine" and restrict imports from Crimea and froze funds for new projects in Russia in line with the policy of the EBRD. On 8 August 2014, Australia announced that Australia is "working towards" tougher sanctions against Russia.

On 12 August 2014, Norway adopted the tougher sanctions against Russia that were imposed by the European Union and the United States on 12 August 2014. The Norwegian foreign minister Børge Brende said that it would also impose restrictions similar to the EU's 1 August sanctions. Russian state-owned banks will be banned from taking long-term and mid-term loans, arms exports will be banned and supplies of equipment, technology and assistance to the Russian oil sector will be prohibited.

On 14 August 2014, Switzerland expanded sanctions against Russia over its threat to Ukraine's sovereignty. Swiss government added 26 more Russians and pro-Russian Ukrainians to the list. The Swiss government said it is expanding measures to prevent the circumvention of sanctions relating to the situation in Ukraine to include the third round of sanctions imposed by the EU in July and also stated that five Russian banks will require authorisation to issue long-term financial instruments in Switzerland. On 28 August 2014, Switzerland amended its sanctions to include the sanctions imposed by the EU in July.

On 14 August 2014, Ukraine passed a law introducing Ukrainian sanctions against Russia. The law includes 172 individuals and 65 entities in Russia and other countries for supporting and financing "terrorism" in Ukraine, though actual sanctions would need approval from Ukraine's National Security and Defense Council.

On 11 September 2014, US president Obama said that the United States would join the EU in imposing tougher sanctions on Russia's financial, energy and defence sectors. On 12 September 2014, the United States imposed sanctions on Russia's largest bank (Sberbank), a major arms maker and arctic (Rostec), deepwater and shale exploration by its biggest oil companies (Gazprom, Gazprom Neft, Lukoil, Surgutneftegas and Rosneft). Sberbank and Rostec will have limited ability to access the US debt markets. The sanction on the oil companies seek to ban co-operation with Russian oil firms on energy technology and services by companies including ExxonMobil and BP.

On 24 September 2014, Japan banned the issue of securities by 5 Russian banks and also tightened restrictions on defence exports to Russia.

On 3 October 2014, US vice president Joe Biden said that "It was America's leadership and the president of the United States insisting, ofttimes almost having to embarrass Europe to stand up and take economic hits to impose costs" and added that "And the results have been massive capital flight from Russia, a virtual freeze on foreign direct investment, a ruble at an all-time low against the dollar, and the Russian economy teetering on the brink of recession. We don't want Russia to collapse. We want Russia to succeed. But Putin has to make a choice. These asymmetrical advances on another country cannot be tolerated. The international system will collapse if they are."

On 18 December 2014, the EU banned some investments in Crimea, halting support for Russian Black Sea oil and gas exploration and stopping European companies from purchasing real estate or companies in Crimea, or offering tourism services. On 19 December 2014, US president Obama imposed sanctions on Russian-occupied Crimea by executive order prohibiting exports of US goods and services to the region.

==== Sanctions specific to Crimea ====
The United States, Canada, the European Union, and other European countries (including Ukraine) imposed economic sanctions specifically targeting Crimea. Sanctions prohibit the sale, supply, transfer, or export of goods and technology in several sectors, including services directly related to tourism and infrastructure. They list seven ports where cruise ships cannot dock. Sanctions against Crimean individuals include travel bans and asset freezes. Visa and MasterCard have stopped service in Crimea between December 2014 and April 2015.

==== 2015–2017 ====
On 16 February 2015, the EU increased its sanction list to cover 151 individuals and 37 entities. Australia indicated that it would follow the EU in new sanctions.

On 18 February 2015, Canada added 37 Russian citizens and 17 Russian entities to its sanction list. Rosneft and the deputy minister of defence, Anatoly Antonov, were both sanctioned. In June 2015, Canada added three individuals and 14 entities, including Gazprom. Media suggested the sanctions were delayed because Gazprom was a main sponsor of the 2015 FIFA Women's World Cup then concluding in Canada.

In September 2015, Ukraine sanctioned more than 388 individuals, over 105 companies and other entities. In accordance with the August 2015 proposals promulgated by the Security Service of Ukraine and the Order of the Cabinet of Ministers of Ukraine No. 808-p dated 12 August 2015, Ukraine, on 2 September 2015, declared Russia an enemy of Ukraine. Also on 16 September 2015, the Ukrainian president Petro Poroshenko issued a decree that named nearly 400 individuals, more than 90 companies and other entities to be sanctioned for the Russia's "criminal activities and aggression against Ukraine."

In April 2016, Lithuania sanctioned 46 individuals who were involved in the detention and sentencing of Ukrainian citizens Nadiya Savchenko, Oleh Sentsov, and Olexandr Kolchenko. Lithuanian foreign minister Linas Linkevičius said that his country wanted to "focus attention on the unacceptable and cynical violations of international law and human rights in Russia. [...] It would be more effective if the blacklist became Europe-wide. We hope to start such a discussion."

On 29 December 2016, the US president Barack Obama signed an Executive Order that expelled 35 Russian diplomats, locked down two Russian diplomatic compounds, and expanded sanctions against Russia for its interference in the 2016 United States elections.

In August 2017, the US Congress enacted the Countering America's Adversaries Through Sanctions Act that imposed new sanctions on Russia for interference in the 2016 elections and its involvement in Ukraine and Syria. The act converted the punitive measures previously imposed by executive orders into law to prevent the president easing, suspending or ending of sanctions without the approval of Congress.

==== 2018 ====
On 15 March 2018, Trump imposed financial sanctions under the act on the 13 Russian government hackers and front organizations that had been indicted by Mueller's investigation into Russian interference in the 2016 United States elections. On 6 April 2018, the United States imposed economic sanctions on seven Russian oligarchs and 12 companies they control, accusing them of "malign activity around the globe", along with 17 top Russian officials, the state-owned weapons-trading company Rosoboronexport and the Russian Financial Corporation Bank (RFC Bank). High-profile names on the list include Oleg Deripaska and Kiril Shamalov, Putin's ex-son-in-law, who married Putin's daughter Katerina Tikhonova in February 2013. The press release stated: "Deripaska has been investigated for money laundering, and has been accused of threatening the lives of business rivals, illegally wiretapping a government official, and taking part in extortion and racketeering. There are also unsubstantiated allegations that Deripaska bribed a government official, ordered the murder of a businessman in the 1990s, and had links to a Russian organized crime group."

Other names on the list include: Oil tycoon Vladimir Bogdanov, Suleyman Kerimov, who faced money-laundering charges in France for allegedly bringing hundreds of millions of euros into the country without reporting the money to tax authorities, Igor Rotenberg, principal owner of Russian oil and gas drilling company Gazprom Burenie, Andrei Skoch, a deputy in the State Duma. U.S. officials said he has longstanding ties to Russian organized criminal groups, Viktor Vekselberg, founder and chairman of the Renova Group, asset management company, and Aleksandr Torshin.

In August 2018, following the poisoning of Sergei Skripal, the U.S. Department of Commerce imposed further sanctions on dual-use exports to Russia which were deemed to be sensitive on national security grounds, including gas turbine engines, integrated circuits, and calibration equipment used in avionics. Until that moment, such exports were considered on a case-by-case basis. Following the introduction of these sanctions, the default position is of denial. Also, on September that year a list of companies in the space and defence industry came under sanctions, including: AeroComposit, Divetechnoservices, Scientific-Research Institute "Vektor", Nilco Group, Obinsk Research and Production Enterprise, Aviadvigatel, Information Technology and Communication Systems (Infoteks), Scientific and Production Corporation of Precision Instruments Engineering and Voronezh Scientific Research Institute "Vega", whom are forbidden from doing business with.

==== 2019 ====
In March 2019, the United States imposed sanctions on persons and companies involved in the Russian shipbuilding industry in response to the Kerch Strait incident: Yaroslavsky Shipbuilding Plant, Zelenodolsk Shipyard Plant, AO Kontsern Okeanpribor, PAO Zvezda (Zvezda), AO Zavod Fiolent (Fiolent), GUP RK KTB Sudokompozit (Sudokompozit), LLC SK Consol-Stroi LTD and LLC Novye Proekty. Also, the U.S. targeted persons involved in the 2018 Donbass general elections.

On 2 August 2019, the U.S State Department announced additional sanctions together with an executive order signed by President Trump which gives the Department of Treasury and the Department of Commerce the authority to implement the sanctions. The sanctions forbid granting Russia loans or other assistance from international financial institutions, prohibition on U.S banks buy non-ruble denominated bonds issued by the Russia after 26 August and lending non-ruble denominated funds to Russia and licensing restrictions for exports of items for chemical and biological weapons proliferation reasons.

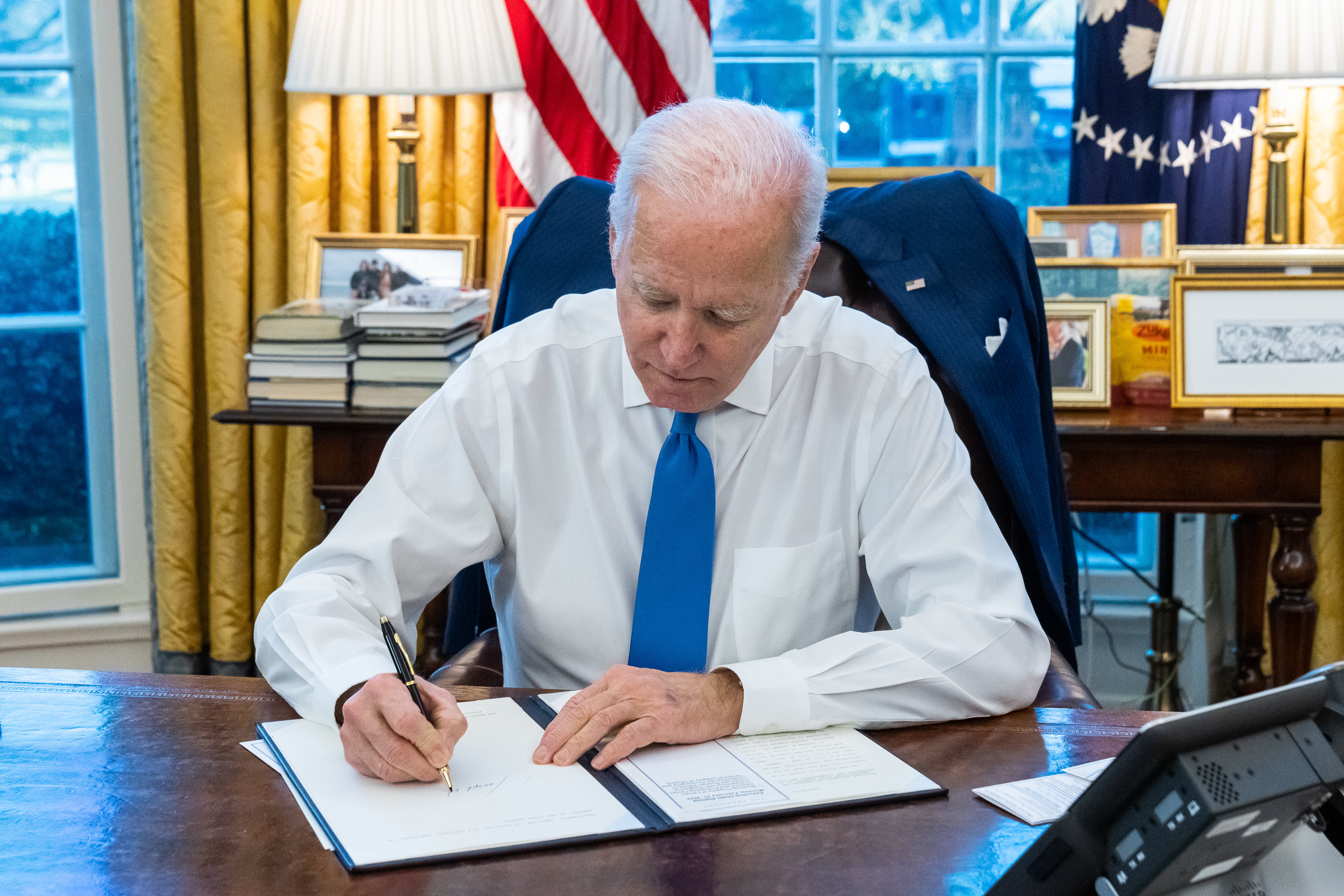
United States president Joe Biden signing executive order 14065 in February 2022 in response to Russia's imminent invasion

In September 2019, pursuant to Executive Order 13685 Maritime Assistance LLC was placed under sanctions due to its export of fuel to Syria as well as for providing support to Sovfracht, another company sanctioned for operating in Crimea. Later in the same month, the United States sanctioned two Russian citizens as well as three companies, Autolex Transport, Beratex Group and Linburg Industries in connection with the Russian interference in the 2016 United States election.

=== Fourth round: 2022 ===
Russia Ukraine Countries that have banned Russian aircraft from their airspace after the 2022 Russian invasion of Ukraine

After Russia invaded Ukraine on 24 February 2022, two countries that had not previously taken part in sanctions, namely South Korea and non-UN member state Taiwan, engaged in sanctions against Russia. On 28 February 2022, Singapore announced that it will impose banking sanctions against Russia for the invasion of Ukraine, thus making it the first country in Southeast Asia to impose sanctions upon Russia; the move was described by the South China Morning Post as being "almost unprecedented". The sanctions also included materials that could be used for weapons against Ukraine, as well as electronics, technology devices and other related equipment, which were listed in a detailed statement on 5 March.

On 28 February 2022, the Central Bank of Russia was blocked from accessing more than $400 billion in foreign-exchange reserves held abroad and the EU imposed sanctions on several Russian oligarchs and politicians. Bjoern Seibert, head of European Commission President Ursula von der Leyen's Cabinet, was in charge of leading the EU's negotiations with the US on the sanction's implementation.

Sergei Aleksashenko, the former Russian deputy finance minister, said: "This is a kind of financial nuclear bomb that is falling on Russia." On 1 March 2022, the French finance minister Bruno Le Maire said the total amount of Russian assets being frozen by sanctions amounted to $1 trillion.

Serbia, Mexico and Brazil have announced that they would not be participating in any economic sanctions against Russia.

Western countries and others began imposing limited sanctions on Russia when it recognised the independence of Donbas. With the commencement of attacks on 24 February, a large number of other countries began applying sanctions with the aim of crippling the Russian economy. The sanctions were wide-ranging, targeting individuals, banks, businesses, monetary exchanges, bank transfers, exports, and imports.

In February 2022, President Joe Biden signed Executive Order 14065 of February 21, 2022 — "Blocking Property of Certain Persons and Prohibiting Certain Transactions With Respect to Continued Russian Efforts To Undermine the Sovereignty and Territorial Integrity of Ukraine".

Faisal Islam of BBC News stated that the measures were far from normal sanctions and were "better seen as a form of economic war". The intent of the sanctions was to push Russia into a deep recession with the likelihood of bank runs and hyperinflation. Islam noted that targeting a G20 central bank in this way had never been done before. Deputy Chairman of the Security Council of Russia and former president Dmitry Medvedev derided Western sanctions imposed on Russia, including personal sanctions, and commented that they were a sign of "political impotence" resulting from NATO's withdrawal from Afghanistan. He threatened to nationalise foreign assets that companies held inside Russia.

On 14 March 2022, Biden's national security advisor Jake Sullivan warned China that it would face consequences if it helped Russia evade sanctions.

A year after Russia's invasion of Ukraine, the United States persuaded countries like Turkey and the United Arab Emirates to crack down on the commercial activities in their countries which had been helping Russia's war efforts in Ukraine. These countries did not back the western sanctions imposed on Russia, instead continuing to trade with it and providing havens for wealthy Russians and their capital. The United States marked the first anniversary of Russia's invasion of Ukraine on February 24, 2023, with new sanctions against Russia aimed at undermining Moscow's ability to launch a war. The new measures by the US Treasury Department affect 22 Russian individuals and 83 entities, adding to the more than 2,500 sanctions imposed last year.

=== 11th round: June 2023 ===
Since April 2014, the European Union has applied multiple rounds of sanctions against the Russian Federation. The 11th round of sanctions in June 2023 focused on dual-use items, including computer chips, and as well as an attempt to limit ship-to-ship transactions of sanctioned goods. More suspensions of Russian broadcasting licenses in Europe were also announced. The U.S. government has urged American companies to halt shipments to over 600 foreign entities amid concerns of diversion to Russia for use in its Ukraine invasion, part of ongoing efforts to restrict Russian access to Western technology. Assistant Secretary Matthew Axelrod emphasized outreach to more than 20 companies and collaboration with senior officials to prevent American-made goods from ending up in Russia.

Transport measures included a full ban on Russian trucks and semi-trailers, limitations on ship-to-ship transfer taking place in the Exclusive Economic Zone of a member state or within 12 nautical miles from the baseline of that member state's coast, a total ban on Russian pipeline oil transfers through the northern branch of the Druzhba pipeline to Germany and Poland, new export and export restrictions on Russia's defence materials as well as goods and technology suited for use in the aerospace industry and jet fuel and fuel additives. Sanctions were also imposed on Russian intellectual property rights and their transfer as well as new criteria on sanctions in the Russian IT-sector with a license issued by the Russian Federal Security Service (FSB) and the Russian Ministry of Industry and Trade.

==== Oil ====
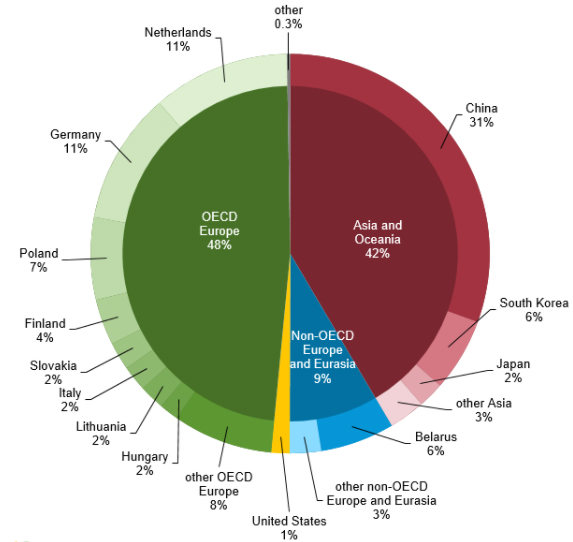
Russian oil exports by destination. Russia exported almost 5 million barrels a day in 2020.

Senator Roger Marshall introduced a bill on 1 March 2022 banning US imports of Russian oil, supported by the GOP minority leader of the Senate Committee on Energy and Natural Resources and seven other Republicans. The first move by a Western nation to impose a flat blockade on Russian petroleum, its top moneymaker, came a day prior from Canada. Canadian Prime Minister Justin Trudeau said that it "sends a powerful message." On 8 March, President Joe Biden ordered a ban on imports of oil, gas and coal from Russia to the US.

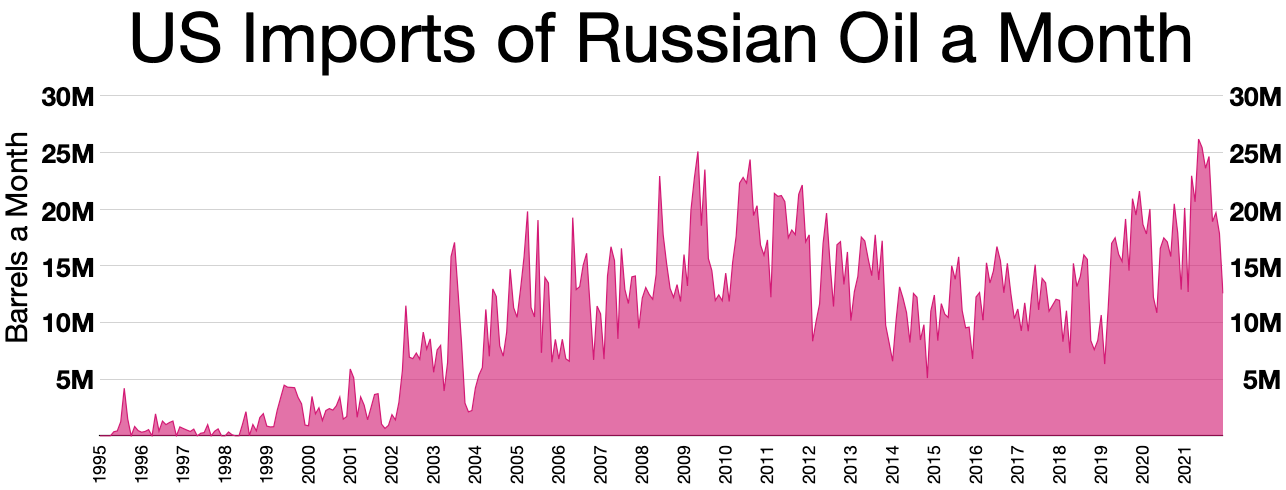
US imports of Russian oil by month before ban

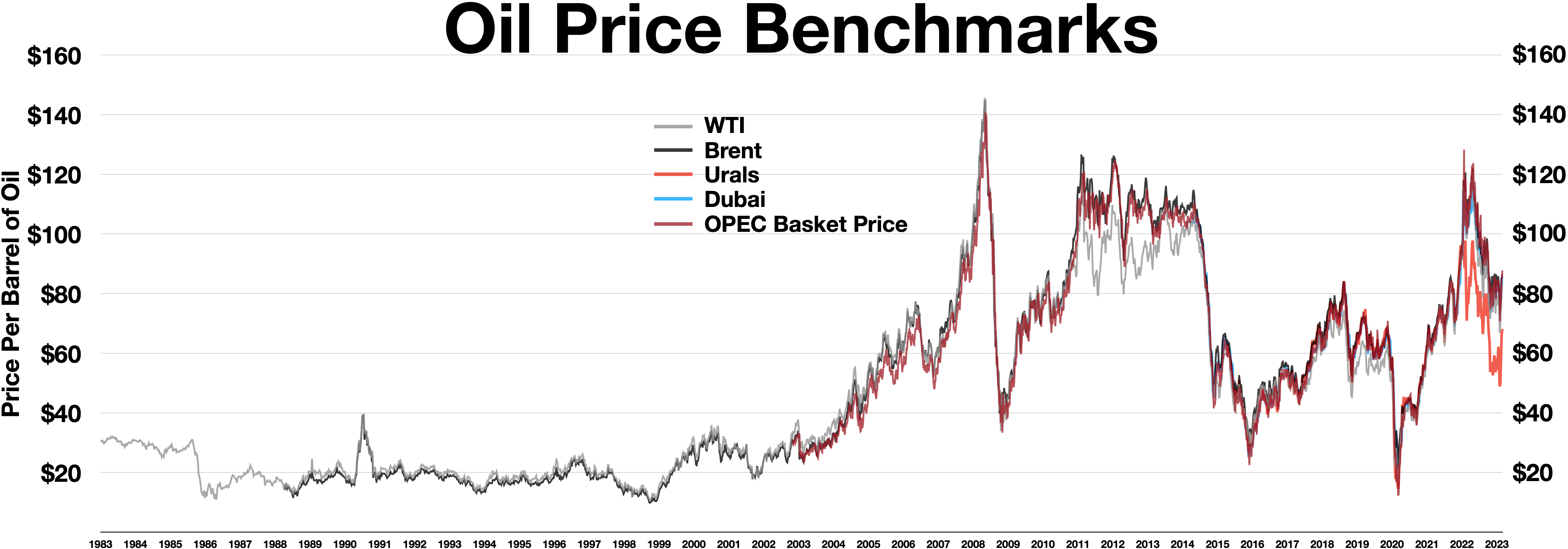
West Texas Intermediate Brent Crude Urals oil (Russian export mix) Dubai Crude OPEC Reference Basket

On September 2, 2022, the G7 group of nations agreed to cap the price of Russian oil in order to reduce Russia's ability to finance its war with Ukraine without further increasing inflation. Joined by the European Union and Australia, the sanctions come into effect on 5 December 2022. From 5 February 2023 an oil products price cap came into effect.

The EU banned all imports of refined oil products from Russia in February 2023, the UK banned Russian oil imports from December 2022. EU imports of oil by ship have fallen by 1.2m bpd to under 0.1m bpd.

Russia's oil and gas revenue for Q1 of 2023 was 1.6 trillion rubles ($19.61 billion), far below the budget for 2023 of 8.9 trillion roubles ($35 billion) per quarter and the 2022 revenue which averaged $42 billion per quarter.

On 16 November 2023, the US Treasury Department sanctioned maritime companies and vessels for supplying Russian oil sold above the G7's price cap. The sanctions targeted three companies of the UAE-based companies, including Kazan Shipping Incorporated, Progress Shipping Company Limited and Gallion Navigation Incorporated, which were accused of exporting Russian crude oil above the $60 a barrel cap. The Emirati vessels were reportedly using US personnel for transporting the Russian crude oil.

==== Banking ====
In a 22 February speech, US president Joe Biden announced restrictions against four Russian banks, including V.E.B., as well as on corrupt billionaires close to Putin. UK prime minister Boris Johnson announced that all major Russian banks would have their assets frozen and be excluded from the UK financial system, and that some export licences to Russia would be suspended. He also introduced a deposit limit for Russian citizens in UK bank accounts, and froze the assets of over 100 additional individuals and entities.

The foreign ministers of the Baltic states called for Russia to be cut off from SWIFT, the global messaging network for international payments. Concern was expressed in Europe because European lenders held most of the nearly $30 billion in foreign banks' exposure to Russia and because China had developed an alternative to SWIFT called CIPS; a weaponisation of SWIFT would provide greater impetus to the development of CIPS which, in turn, could weaken SWIFT. Other leaders calling for Russia to be stopped from accessing SWIFT include Czech president Miloš Zeman, and UK prime minister Boris Johnson. On 26 February, the German foreign minister Annalena Baerbock and economy minister Robert Habeck made a joint statement backing targeted restrictions of Russia from SWIFT. Shortly thereafter, it was announced that major Russian banks would be removed from SWIFT, although there would still be limited accessibility to ensure the continued ability to pay for gas shipments.

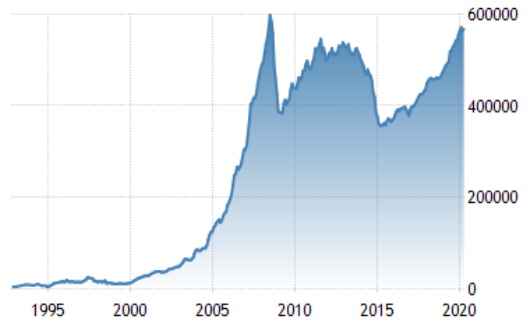
Foreign-exchange reserves of the Central Bank of Russia. In 2014 Prime minister Dmitry Medvedev has admitted the sanctions have hurt the Russian economy, leading to a loss of "tens of billions of dollars because of the sanctions."

It was also announced that the West would place sanctions on the Russian Central Bank, which holds $630bn in foreign reserves, to prevent it from liquidating assets to offset the impact of sanctions.

On 26 February, two Chinese state banks—the Industrial and Commercial Bank of China, which is the largest bank in the world, and the Bank of China, which is the country's biggest currency trader—were limiting financing to purchase Russian raw materials, which was limiting Russian access to foreign currency. On 28 February, Switzerland and Monaco froze a number of Russian assets and joined EU sanctions. According to Ignazio Cassis, the president of the Swiss Confederation, the decision was unprecedented but consistent with Swiss neutrality.

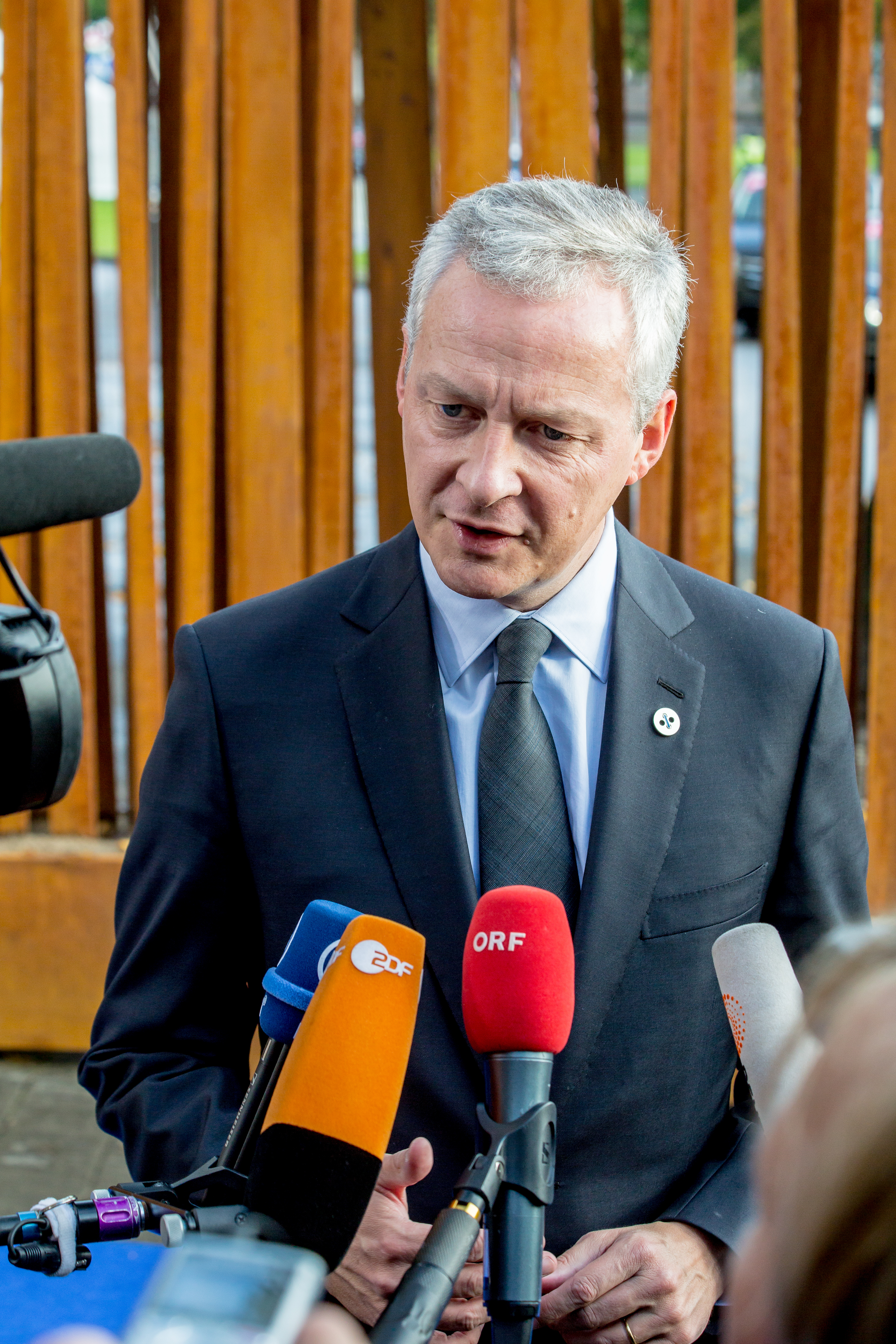
French Finance Minister Bruno Le Maire claimed earlier that the EU "will bring about the collapse" of the economy of Russia.

Singapore became the first Southeast Asian country to impose sanctions on Russia by restricting banks and transactions linked to Russia; the move was described by the South China Morning Post as being "almost unprecedented".

On 28 February, Japan announced that its central bank would join sanctions by limiting transactions with Russia's central bank. The Central Bank of Russia was blocked from accessing more than $400 billion in foreign-exchange reserves held abroad. EU foreign affairs chief Josep Borrell said that Western governments "cannot block the reserves of the Russian central bank in Moscow or in China".

On 1 March, the French finance minister Bruno Le Maire said that Russian assets being frozen by sanctions amounted to $1 trillion. South Korea announced it would stop all transactions with 7 main Russian banks and their affiliates, restrict the purchase of Russian treasury bonds, and agreed to "immediately implement" and join any further economics sanctions imposed against Russia by the European Union.

Following sanctions and criticisms of their relations with Russian business, many companies chose to exit Russian or Belarusian markets voluntarily or in order to avoid potential future sanctions. Visa, Mastercard, and American Express independently blocked Russian banks as of 2 March. Following Swiss sanctions on Russia, Credit Suisse issued orders to destroy documents linking Russian oligarchs to yacht loans, a move which led to considerable criticism.

In July 2023 Russia attempted to get the SWIFT ban partially lifted by making it a condition to extending the Black Sea Grain Initiative.

===== The ruble =====
In 2013 there were around 35 rubles to the US dollar. Following the seizure of Crimea and sanctions starting, the ruble fell. In 2015–2019 it traded in the 60–70 range. In 2020–2021 it moved to the 70-80 range and since the 2022 invasion of Ukraine and a large increase in sanctions, it has slowly declined to reach 100 in August 2023.

==== Dual-use ban ====
The US instituted export controls, a novel sanction focused on restricting Russian access to high-tech components, both hardware and software, made with any parts or intellectual property from the US. The sanction required that any person or company that wanted to sell technology, semiconductors, encryption software, lasers, or sensors to Russia request a licence, which by default was denied. The enforcement mechanism involved sanctions against the person or company, with the sanctions focused on the shipbuilding, aerospace, and defence industries.

=== EU sanctions ===
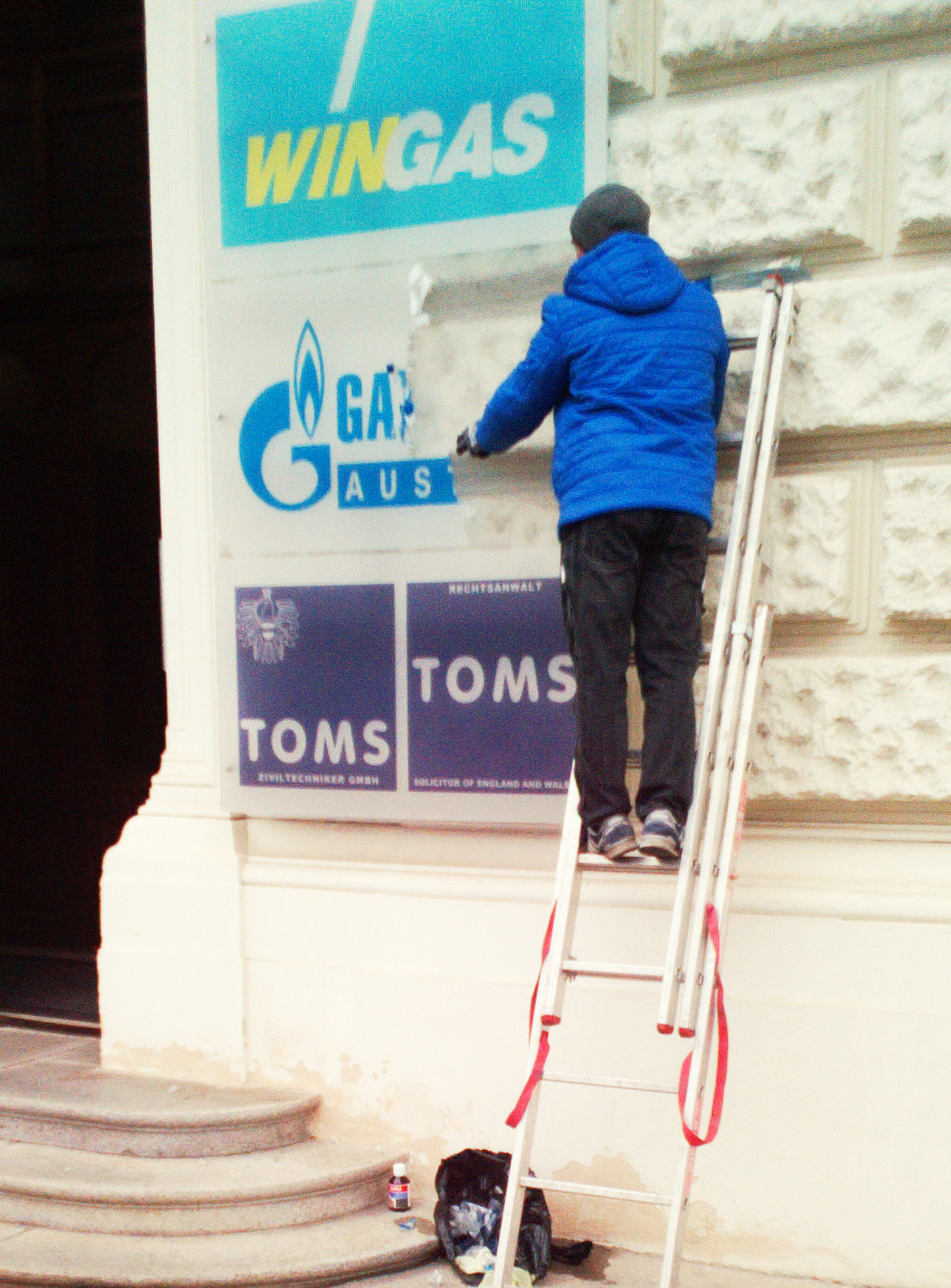
A worker removes the sign from Gazprom's office in Vienna in March 2022

On the morning of 24 February, Ursula von der Leyen, the president of the European Commission, announced "massive" EU sanctions to be adopted by the union. The sanctions targeted technological transfers, Russian banks, and Russian assets. Josep Borrell, the High Representative of the Union for Foreign Affairs and Security Policy, stated that Russia would face "unprecedented isolation" as the EU would impose the "harshest package of sanctions [which the union has] ever implemented". He also said that "these are among the darkest hours of Europe since the Second World War". President of the European Parliament Roberta Metsola called for "immediate, quick, solid and swift action" and convened an extraordinary session of Parliament for 1 March.

In May 2022, the European Commission proposed and approved a partial ban on oil imports from Russia, part of the economic response to the Russian invasion of Ukraine.

European sanctions are imposed according to Decision 2014/145/CFSP of the European Council and EU Regulation 269/2014, which authorize the freezing of assets.

Josep Borrell said he wants EU countries to confiscate frozen foreign-exchange reserves of the Russian central bank—which amount to over $300 billion—to cover the costs of rebuilding Ukraine after the war. Russian Deputy Foreign Minister Alexander Grushko remarked that Borrell's initiative amounted to "complete lawlessness" and said it would hurt Europe if adopted. In June 2023, Christine Lagarde, President of the European Central Bank countered EU President, Ursula von der Leyen's plan to use confiscated Russian assets for rebuilding war-torn Ukraine. Such a plan would "undermine the legal and economic foundations of the Euro internationally", according to Lagarde.

Since February 2022, the European Union has sanctioned exports to the Russian Federation at a total value of €43.9 billion and imports to the EU worth €91.2 billion, including financial and legal services.

In January 2024, authorities in the Netherlands, Germany, Latvia, and Lithuania arrested three suspects for breaching EU sanctions against Russia. Europol and Eurojust supported this investigation, which revealed that a Dutch company had illegally shipped goods from Germany through Latvia and Lithuania to Russia, violating sanctions due to Russia's aggression against Ukraine.

On 22 March 2024, the EU imposed new sanctions against 33 persons and entities over the death of Alexei Navalny, a Russian opposition politician. The new listings include imposed sanctions on the Russian justice and prison officials responsible for imprisoning Navalny and the two penal colonies where Alexei Navalny was held from June 2022 until his death.

The EU Council renewed its restrictive measures against Russia for another six months, until 31 January 2025, in response to Russia's continued destabilizing actions in Ukraine. Despite Russia's ongoing violations of international law, the EU maintained these sanctions and pledged further measures if necessary. The EU also reiterated its unwavering support for Ukraine's sovereignty and condemned Russia's escalated attacks on civilians and infrastructure.

In November 2025, the European Commission announced that will provide financial aid to Baltic nations suffering collateral economic damage from EU sanctions against Russia.

==== European impoundment of ships ====
A 5 April 2022 article by Insider claims the total cost of yachts impounded throughout Europe be over $2 billion. This amount includes the motoryacht Tango, seized pursuant to United States sanctions with Spanish assistance.

- France

On 26 February, the French Navy intercepted Russian cargo ship Baltic Leader in the English Channel. The ship was suspected of belonging to a company targeted by the sanctions. The ship was escorted to the port of Boulogne-sur-Mer and was being investigated.

On 2 March 2022, French customs officials seized the yacht Amore Vero at a shipyard in La Ciotat. The Amore Vero is believed to be owned by the sanctioned oligarch Igor Sechin. Two yachts belonging to Alexei Kuzmichevof Alfa Bank were seized by France on March 24.

- Germany

On 2 March 2022, German authorities immobilized Dilbar, owned by Alisher Usmanov.

- Greece

On 19 April 2022, Greece announced the seizure of the Russian-flagged petroleum tanker ship Pegas, which docked at Karystos after encountering rough seas. The seizure applies solely to the ship and not its cargo.

- Italy

On 4 March, Italian police impounded Lady M. Authorities believe the ship is owned by Alexei Mordashov. The same day, Italian police seized the yacht of Gennady Timchenko, Lena, in the port city of Sanremo. The yacht was also placed on a United States sanctions list. On 12 March 2022, Italian authorities in the port of Trieste seized the sailing yacht A, known to be owned by Andrey Melnichenko. A spokesperson for Melnichenko vowed to contest the seizure.

- Netherlands

On 6 April 2022, Dutch Minister of Foreign Affairs Wopke Hoekstra sent a letter on the subject of sanctions addressed to the House of Representatives. In it, he reported that while no Russian superyachts were at anchor in the Netherlands, twelve yachts under construction across five shipyards were immobilized to ascertain ownership, including possible beneficial ownership.

- Spain

In March 2022, the Spanish Ministry of Development (known by its acronym "MITMA") detained three yachts pending investigation into whether their true owners are individuals sanctioned by the European Union. Valerie is detained in the Port of Barcelona; Lady Anastasia in Port Adriano in Calvià, Mallorca; and Crescent in the Port of Tarragona.

- United Kingdom

On 29 March 2022, Grant Shapps, the British secretary of state for transport, announced the National Crime Agency's seizure of Phi. The yacht was docked at Canary Wharf and was about to leave.

=== Unilateral sanctions by Ukraine ===
In May 2023, the Czech Republic introduced unilateral sanctions against the Russian economy. It also sanctioned the head of the Russian Orthodox Church, Vladimir Mikhailovich Gundyayev, better known as Patriarch Kirill, due to his collaboration with clerics from the Russian Orthodox Church, a measure that is seldom taken during armed conflicts. Vladimir Mikhailovich Gundyayev has been identified as a close confident of Vladimir Putin, but he never advocated any violent actions during wartime, and was not placed under EU sanctions. The cleric is now barred from entry into the Czech Republic, a measure that was criticised by members of both denominations.

In November 2023, Ukraine sanctioned the Swiss company Nestle for being ‘sponsors of war’ and blacklisted the company for its continued presence in Russia, joining food and drink peers Unilever, PepsiCo and Mars. These food companies manufacture essential foods and dietary components that are explicitly exempt from international sanctions. In the same month, Ukraine also placed sanctions on the Swiss company NVS Technologies, owned by a Russian individual, that provides geolocation equipment to companies in Eastern Europe and elsewhere. Ukraine government's National Agency on Corruption Prevention (NACP) gave no further details on the reason for these sanctions.

In mid-2026 Ukraine intensified its long-range attacks on the Russian oil industry in an effort dubbed "long-range sanctions" by President Volodymyr Zelenskyy. While not constituting sanctions in the traditional sense, the intensified long-range drone strikes, with the most notable being an attack on the Moscow TANECO Oil Refining Complex on 18 June, led to fuel shortages in around a dozen Russian regions, forcing Russia to import fuel by sea from Asia.

== Opposition to sanctions ==
Russia Countries on Russia's "Unfriendly Countries List". Countries and territories on the list have imposed or joined sanctions against Russia.

Italy, Hungary, Greece, France, Cyprus and Slovakia were among the EU states most sceptical about the early sanctions and called for review of sanctions. The Hungarian prime minister Viktor Orbán stated that Europe "shot itself in the foot" by introducing economic sanctions. Bulgarian prime minister Boyko Borisov stated, "I don't know how Russia is affected by the sanctions, but Bulgaria is affected severely". Czech president Miloš Zeman and Slovak prime minister Robert Fico also said that the sanctions should be lifted.

Some officials from other Western countries, including Greek prime minister Alexis Tsipras and German economy minister Sigmar Gabriel stated their preference for dialogue rather than sanctions.

Paolo Gentiloni, the Italian minister of foreign affairs, said that the sanctions "are not the solution to the conflict". In January 2017, Swiss economics minister and former president of Switzerland Johann Schneider-Ammann stated his concern about the sanctions' harm to the Swiss economy, and expressed hope that they will soon come to an end. Some companies, most notably Siemens Gas Turbine Technologies LLC and Lufthansa Service Holding were reported to attempt bypassing the sanctions and exporting power generation turbines to the annexed Crimea.

In August 2015, the British think tank Bow Group released a report on sanctions, calling for the removal of them. According to the report, the sanctions have had "adverse consequences for European and American businesses, and if they are prolonged... they can have even more deleterious effects in the future"; the potential cost of sanctions for the Western countries has been estimated as over $700 billion.

In June 2017, Germany and Austria criticized the U.S. Senate over new sanctions against Russia that target the planned Nord Stream 2 gas pipeline from Russia to Germany, stating that the United States was threatening Europe's energy supplies (see also Russia in the European energy sector). In a joint statement Austria's chancellor Christian Kern and Germany's foreign minister Sigmar Gabriel said that "Europe's energy supply is a matter for Europe, and not for the United States of America." They also said: "To threaten companies from Germany, Austria and other European states with penalties on the U.S. market if they participate in natural gas projects such as Nord Stream 2 with Russia or finance them introduces a completely new and very negative quality into European-American relations."

Nations and individuals that oppose sanctions against Russia state that sanctions do not generally result in a change in the policies of the sanctioned nation, and that sanctions mostly hurt the civilian population, who have little control over the issues pertaining to foreign policy.

=== 2022 to date ===
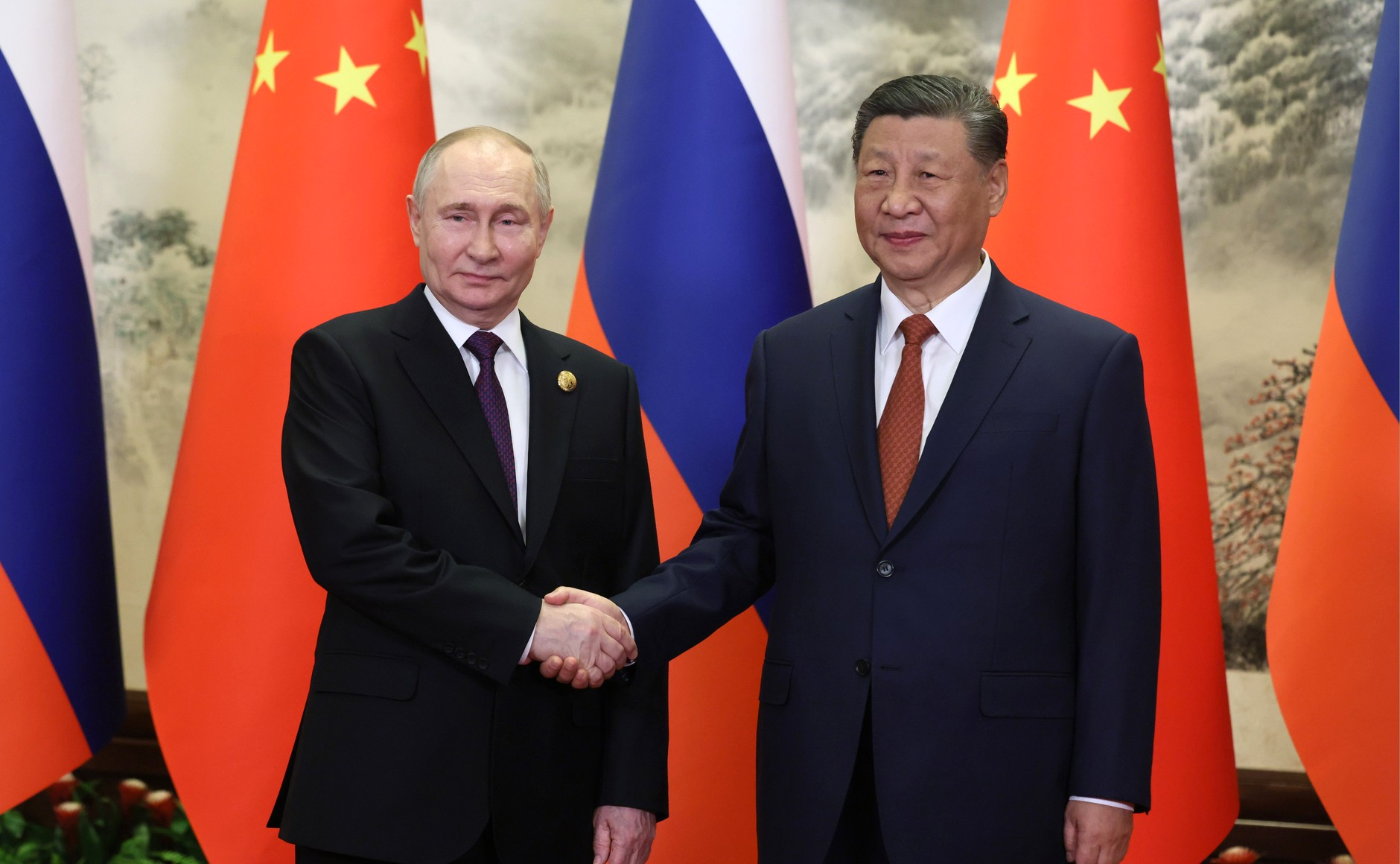
Russian President Vladimir Putin with Chinese leader Xi Jinping during Putin's visit to China in May 2024

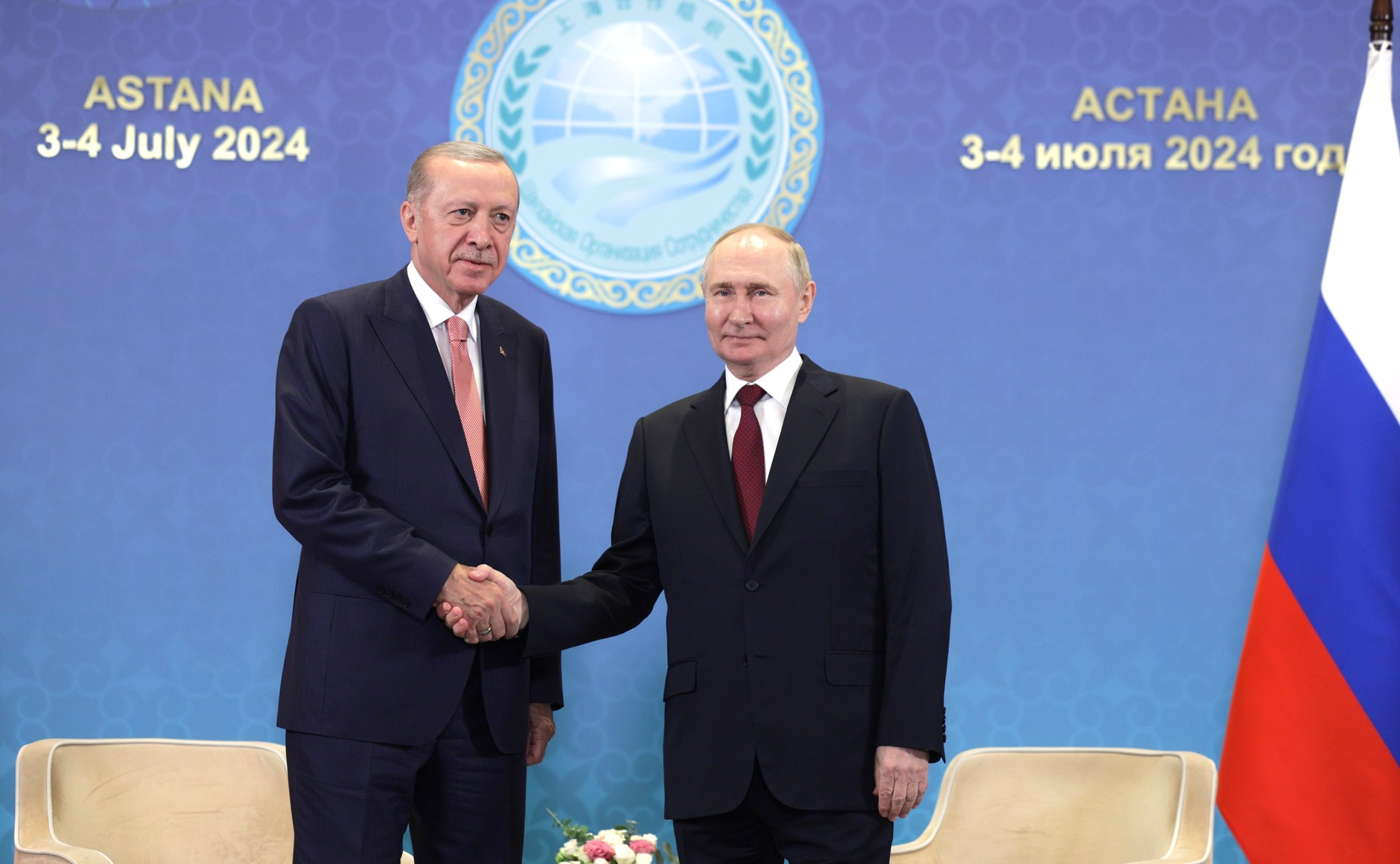
Turkish President Erdoğan with Russian President Putin in July 2024

In March 2022, China expressed opposition to sanctions against Russia as punishment for invading Ukraine. No country in Africa, Latin America or the Middle East has imposed sanctions on Russia.

As part of the sanctions imposed on Russia, on 2 September 2022, the finance ministers of the G7 group agreed to the 2022 Russian oil price cap, designed to allow Russia to maintain production but limiting the revenue from oil sales. In October 2022, India, the world's third-largest oil importer, announced it would not join the effort to cap the price of Russian oil. India obtains Russian crude at a significant discount, and regards Russia as a strategic, economic partner.

In 2022, Turkish President Recep Tayyip Erdoğan said that Turkey could not join sanctions against Russia due to import dependence. Turkey bought almost half of its gas from Russia.

Hungary continues to be opposed to sanctions and blocks some sanctions that the EU wishes to put in place.

=== Efforts to lift sanctions ===
Some efforts were made to try to lift sanctions.

France announced in January 2016 that it wanted to lift the sanctions in mid-2016. Earlier, U.S. Secretary of State John Kerry mentioned a possible lifting of sanctions.

As Trump's National Security Advisor, Michael T. Flynn was an important link in the connections between Putin and Trump in the "Ukraine peace plan", an unofficial plan "organized outside regular diplomatic channels....at the behest of top aides to President Putin". This plan, aimed at easing the sanctions imposed on Russia, progressed from Putin and his advisors to Ukrainian politician Andrey Artemenko, Felix Sater, Michael Cohen, and Flynn, where he would have then presented it to Trump. The New York Times reported that Sater delivered the plan "in a sealed envelope" to Cohen, who then passed it on to Flynn in February 2017, just before his resignation.

In November 2017, the Secretary General of the Council of Europe Thorbjørn Jagland said that the Council of Europe considered lifting the sanctions on Russia due to concerns that Russia may leave the organization, which would be "a big step back for Europe". Jagland was also criticized of "caving in to blackmail" by other Council members for his conciliatory approach to Russia.

On 8 March 2019, the Italian prime minister Giuseppe Conte stated that Italy is working on lifting the sanctions, which "the ruling parties in Rome say are ineffective and hurt the Italian economy".

On 25 June 2024, China urged the European Union to lift sanctions on Chinese companies accused of supporting Russia's war in Ukraine. Spokesperson Mao Ning stated that China consistently opposes unilateral sanctions and has formally protested to the EU.

== Other actions not linked directly to sanctions ==
=== Air travel ===
The UK closed its airspace to Russia aircraft the day after the invasion of Ukraine, swiftly followed by the EU, Canada and the US.

=== Diplomatic actions ===
In March 2018, 29 Western countries and NATO expelled in total at least 149 Russian diplomats, including 60 by the United States, in response to the poisoning of Skripal and his daughter on 4 March in the United Kingdom, which has been blamed on Russia. Other measures were also taken.

Shortly after the 2022 invasion of Ukraine a co-ordinated action was taken by the west with over 600 Russian diplomats being declared personae non gratae, 400 were believed to be spies.

=== Turkish control of transiting ships to/from the Black Sea ===
Turkish Foreign Minister Mevlüt Çavuşoğlu announced on 27 February 2022 that his government would legally recognise the Russian invasion as a "war", which provides grounds for implementing the Montreux Convention Regarding the Regime of the Straits blocking the transit of Russian Federation and Ukrainian military vessels into/from the Black Sea.

=== Independent company actions ===
Following sanctions and negative sentiment towards engaging in Russian business, many companies have chosen to exit Russians or Belarusian markets voluntarily or in order to avoid potential future sanctions. Visa, Mastercard and American Express independently blocked Russian banks as of March 2. Jeffrey Sonnenfeld and colleagues at the Yale School of Management have produced, and are keeping updated, a detailed list tracking those companies which have exited the Russian market, which have reduced their operations there, or which have chosen to remain.

Companies have experienced difficulties exiting Russia, a study from Yale in July 2023 found that of 1,000 companies pledging to leave Russia, just over half managed to make a clean break, with many others having scaled down activities. The highest cost of leaving being borne by energy and utility companies.

By December 2022, after a mass exodus, the only foreign car manufacturers in Russia are Chinese.

In July 2023, Russia seized Russian assets owned by Danish company Carlsberg and French company Danone.

=== Tax haven ===
In February 2023 the EU Council's Code of Conduct Group added Russia to the EU tax haven blacklist as a non-cooperative jurisdictions for tax purposes.

== Political significance ==
The economic sanctions imposed on Russia, serve as a tool of nonrecognition policy, by underscoring that the countries which impose these sanctions do not recognize Russian annexation of Crimea. Having these sanctions in place prevents the situation from being treated as a fait accompli. As a reaction to the 2022 Russian invasion of Ukraine, Western nations introduced unprecedented sanctions on Russian individuals, energy commodities and high-tech industries with the aim to change Russia's "political behavior". According to a study by the Swedish Defence Research Agency, economic sanctions have so far failed to force Russia to change its policy towards Ukraine.

Faisal Islam of BBC News stated that the measures were far from normal sanctions and were "better seen as a form of economic war". The intent of the sanctions was to push Russia into a deep recession with the likelihood of bank runs and hyperinflation. Islam noted that targeting a G20 central bank in this way had never been done before.

== Effects of sanctions ==
=== Effects on Russian economy ===
==== 2014–2021 ====
Russian president Vladimir Putin had accused the United States of conspiring with Saudi Arabia to intentionally weaken the Russian economy by decreasing the price of oil. By mid-2016, Russia had lost an estimated $170 billion due to financial sanctions, with another $400 billion lost in revenues from oil and gas. According to Ukrainian officials, (Note: Liubov Nepop, the Head of the Ukrainian Mission to the EU, and Petro Poroshenko, the president of Ukraine) the sanctions forced Russia to change its approach toward Ukraine and undermined the Russian military advances in the region. Representatives of these countries said that they will lift sanctions against Russia only after Moscow fulfills the Minsk II agreements.

==== 2022 ====
In April 2022, Russia supplied 45% of EU's gas imports, earning $900 million a day. In the first two months after the invasion of Ukraine, Russia earned $66.5 billion from fossil fuel exports, and the EU accounted for 71% of that trade.

In 2022 the Russian rouble fell against the US Dollar and Euro on reduced trading as sanctions prevent trading with foreign accounts or currencies. In May 2022, the Russian Central Bank slashed its key rate by 300 basis points to 11% in order to stimulate local investments. The federal trade surplus was increased due to high prices for Russian commodity exports and a rapid fall in imports. On 27 May 2022, Russian Finance Minister Anton Siluanov stated that extra revenues from the sale of natural gas in the amount of €13.7 billion will be used to increase pension funds for retired individuals and families with children, as well for "special operations" in the Ukraine. Russia has also increased energy exports to China and India to replace decreased revenues in Europe. Bloomberg reported that in the first half of 2022, Russia pocketed an extra $24 billion from selling energy to both nations.

Citizens of the Russian Federation faced surging inflation and unemployment, expensive credit, capital controls, restricted travel, and shortages of goods. Analysts have identified similarities with conditions in the decade following the collapse of the Soviet Union in 1991. Russia's Kaliningrad exclave faces ever-increasing isolation. A source close to the Kremlin told the Russian-language independent news website Meduza that "There's probably almost nobody who's happy with Putin. Businesspeople and many cabinet members are unhappy that the president started this war without thinking through the scale of the sanctions. Normal life under these sanctions is impossible."

On 27 June 2022, Bloomberg reported that Russia is poised to default on its foreign debt (eurobonds), for the first time since 1918 after the Bolshevik revolution. According to the source, the country missed a debt payment due to sanctions on Russian banks. Finance Minister Siluanov dismissed the possible default status as a "farce", since Russia has plenty of funds to repay the debt. Associated Press reported that the official default on Russian's foreign debt would take time to be confirmed. Financial analysts described Russia's situation as unique, since it has extensive amounts of cash to fulfill its debt obligations.

A Yale study projects a catastrophic outlook for Russian businesses if Western countries are able to keep up the sanctions against Russia's petrochemical industry. Western economists see long-lasting costs to the Russian economy from the exit of large foreign firms and brain drain, while Russia claims it has replaced those entities with domestic investments. Long term, Russia's economy will depend on the price development of fossil fuel energy, and Russia's continued economic alliances with countries that do not impose sanctions, including China, the Middle East, India, as well as nations in Africa and South America.

Russia's gross domestic product contracted 4% in the second quarter of 2022, revised from 6.5%, with a 15.3% drop in wholesale trade, and a 9.8% contraction in retail trade. 47 of the world's biggest 200 companies had not left Russia by summer 2022, particularly energy companies remain invested there. According to Western analysts, remaining companies have experienced expropriation and nationalization pressures, but officially Russia has denied that it is interested in such actions. In August 2022, Russia's trade and industry minister Denis Manturov stated, "we are not interested in the nationalization of enterprises or their removal." In October 2022, a government decree was approved, allowing a Russian state-run company to seize ExxonMobil's 30% stake in the Sakhalin-1 oil and gas project, and to decide whether foreign shareholders, including Japan's SODECO, can retain their participation.

Russia continued to pump almost as much oil as before its 2022 invasion of Ukraine. Sales to the Middle East and Asia have replaced declining exports of gas and oil to Europe, and due to the higher price, Moscow made $20 billion monthly compared to $14.6 billion a year before (2021). Despite international sanctions, Russian energy sales increased in value, and its exports expanded with new financing options and payment methods for international buyers. According to the Institute of International Finance, "Russia is swimming in cash", earning $97 billion from oil and gas sales through July 2022. According to a former Russian energy executive, "there came a realization that the world needs oil, and nobody's brave enough to embargo 7.5 million barrels a day of Russian oil and oil products".

According to the Former First Deputy Chairman of the Central Bank of Russia Oleg Vyugin, sanctions imposed against Moscow over the conflict in Ukraine were only 30%-40% effective as Russia has found ways to overcome restrictions. He confirmed the contraction of the Russian economy by 4% in 2022 due to sanctions, but found this has been "no catastrophe" for the Russian Federation. Russia's current account surplus – the difference in value between exports and imports – has been soaring due to declining imports, but he warned that a further embargo on Russian exports could reduce crucial revenues. He also added that the impact of US and European export controls in the technology sector will be felt with some delay.

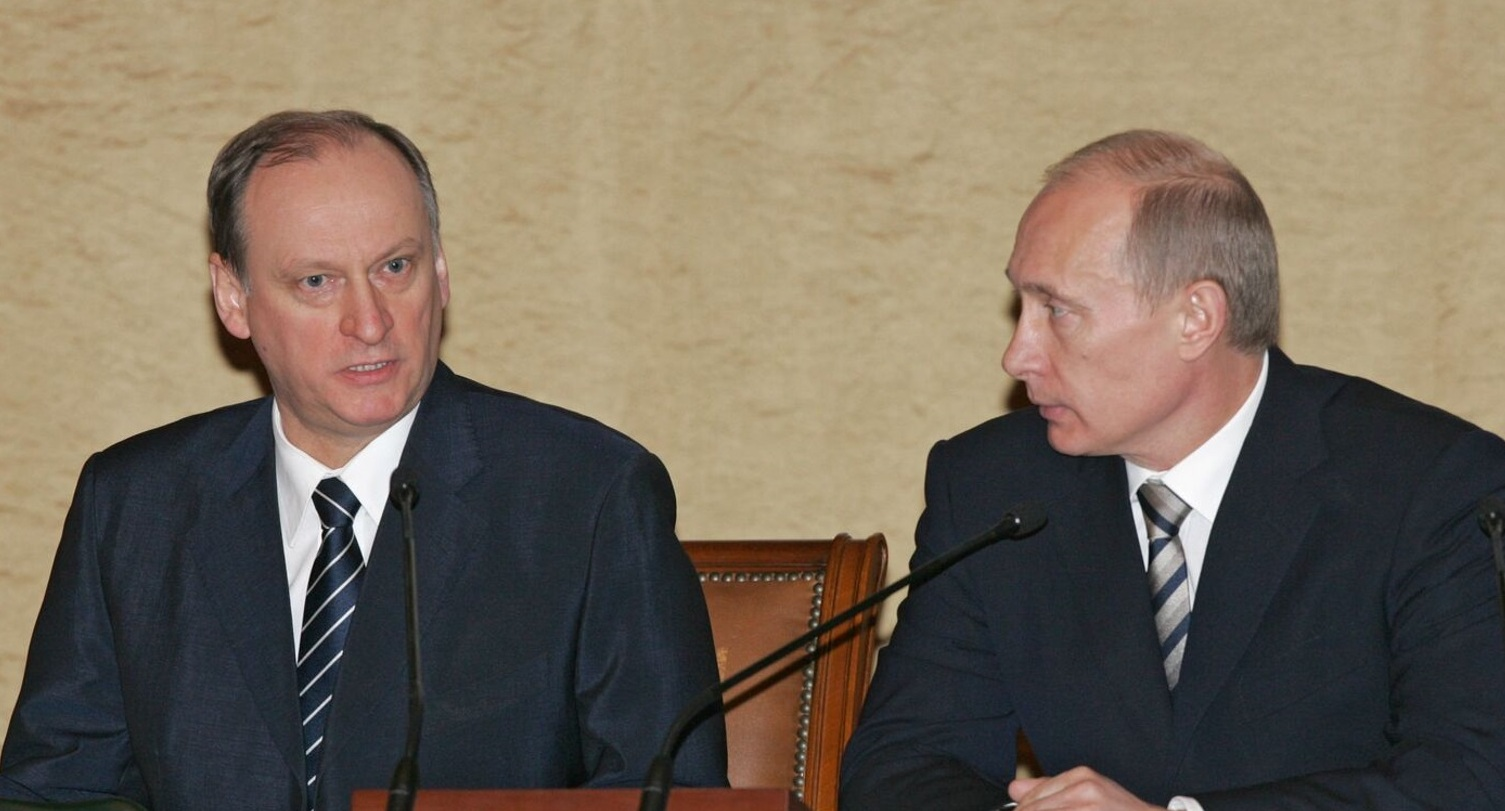
Putin's national security adviser Nikolai Patrushev downplayed the sanctions, saying that "Russia is reorienting itself away from the European market to the African, Asian and Latin American markets".

In December 2022, when the European Union implemented its oil embargo and price cap on Russian crude, economic news channels reported a drop of Russian oil exports by 54% in the first week. Russia switched to sending nearly 90% of its oil to Asia, albeit at a lower price. Shipowners in Asia as well were reportedly less likely to transport Russian crude after the European sanctions came into force.

In late 2022, the Russian economy's relative resilience to Western sanctions was tested when financial sanctions seriously impacted Russia's VTB Bank, the country's No. 2 lender. VTB bank has frozen assets abroad worth around 600 billion roubles, and then purchased Otkritie FC Bank to make up for the loss. The Bank of Russia agreed to the sale for 233 billion roubles in cash and treasury bonds, increasing the share-value for Moscow-listed VTB. Dominant lender Sberbank, however, was less affected by financial sanctions and produced a quarterly profit. The central bank announced a bail-out of 555 billion roubles, and with the recent sale of Otkritie obtained a refund of 352 billion roubles.

According to Russian calculations, the country's economy shrank by 2.5% in 2022, showing better dynamics than expected by Western analysts. Both Russia's current trade account balance and foreign currency reserves increased significantly due to decreased imports from Western countries. Because of the increased expenditure for the 2022 Russian invasion of Ukraine, Moscow posted a record budget deficit of US$47.3 billion in 2022 (2.3% of GDP) requiring a drawdown from the National Wealth Fund. Some of the reduction in trade with Western Europe was compensated by a record trade balance with China, US$190 billion in 2022. The Russian state as well as its citizens purchased a record amount of gold from Russian banks in 2022 (64 to 67 metric tons). Gold, which significantly increased in value in late 2022 and early 2023, is seen as another backbone of the Russian economy. Russia attempts to create a gold-backed stablecoin to support its foreign trade in light of ongoing sanctions.

==== 2023 ====
Two financial reports from late 2022 and early 2023 concluded that only 8.5% or less than one out of ten companies had divested at least one subsidiary in Russia. In comparison, between economic regions, 18% of US companies with subsidiaries exited Russia, some 15% of Japanese firms and only 8.3% of EU firms have done the same. Among EU nations, Italian companies were least likely to exit from Russia. Particularly firms involved in lucrative resource extraction and agriculture remain active there, but also pharmaceutical companies, which are exempt from sanctions. Quantitatively, those companies that left Russia (a total of 120) represent only 6.5% of the total profits of all the firms active there. Even companies that planned a full withdrawal had struggled to pull out their businesses swiftly and comply with sanctions or NGO demands, according to business analysts.

Year on year, Russian car production fell 67% from 2022 to 2023. Truck production decreased 24% A particularly drastic fall occurred in May 2022 when car production dropped 97%, but rebounded after some adaptations. Car sales fell 63%

In March 2023, renewed assessments of the Russian economy were made public. Former Russian Central Bank official Alexandra Prokopenko had warned that "Russia's economy is entering a long-term regression". Western economists also expressed that Russia's resilience was only short-term and that subsequent to the oil and gas embargo by Europe in late 2022 and early 2023, the RF would enter a recessive period. The IMF predicts that Russia's economic growth would be at only 1%, down from 3.5% before 2014, when it annexed the Crimea from Ukraine. Russia's federal budget deficit continued into 2023, requiring additional drawdowns from the National Wealth Fund, economists predicted a further isolation of the Russian economy. Later that month, Mr. Putin and General Secretary of the Chinese Communist Party Xi Jinping met again to further increase economic cooperation, particularly in the area of high technology and energy. Despite Russia's slow growth, it has increased its military output, as the production of finished metal goods increased by 7% in 2022 due to the conflict in Ukraine. A detailed analysis of daily web-scraped data showed that international sanctions significantly disrupted Russian price dynamics, with sanctions associated with an average increase of 11.7 percentage points in the Russian Consumer Price Index, though effects varied across product categories.

In early April 2023, Bloomberg News noted that Russia's seaborne crude oil exports had increased due to the sanctions on pipeline deliveries to Western Europe. According to ship-tracking data, the nation's shipments surged by 1 million barrels/d to a new high of 4.13 million barrels. Data also indicates that most sales were conducted below the price cap of $60/barrel because Russia offered discounts on Urals oil or the price cap set by Western nations showed some effects to reduce Russia's revenues.

In mid-2023, new data showed that Russia's economic decline was well below the value analysts had predicted earlier. The fall-out for the Russian economy was already much less severe in 2022, namely 2.1% rather than the double-digit numbers the West forecasted. Meanwhile, the Russian Central Bank held its interest rate at 7.5% for June to allow more borrowing by the Russian economy that still experiences a significant inflation risk. China-Russia trade surged as well reaching $93.8 billion since January 2023, a 75.6% increase, to replace declining trade volumes with the countries imposing sanctions. Its economy is now predicted to only fall by 0.7%. The ruble continues its slow but steady decline.

The Russian budget deficit for the five months to May was 3.41 trillion roubles ($41.9 billion) higher than the planned budget deficit for the whole year, with gas and oil revenues down 49% on 2022, spending was up 26% and non-oil-and-gas revenues were 9% higher.

Some limitations on the effect of sanctions were seen in July 2023, when crude oil prices were again up with some Urals oil trading just above US$60 per barrel. The recent decline in oil revenue was due to lower prices in late 2022 and early 2023, with little sign that Russia's oil export volume decreased.

In late December 2023, Deputy Prime Minister of Russia Alexander Novak confirmed earlier reports that the country had shifted most of its sales of Russian crude to China and India while still supplying 4-5% of its total sales to European destinations. He also forecasted relatively high prices at around $80–85 (roughly €72-77) per barrel to continue well into 2024. In 2023 about 90% of Russian oil exports were delivered to the two largest Asian nations, which are totalling a revenue of almost 9 trillion rubles (roughly $98 billion), which is about 27% of its GDP. Russia had reported that 40-45% were due to exports to India, a market that is expected to grow most rapidly for its Asian-Pacific segment. Initially, E.U. politicians had shrugged off this development, assuming net revenues for Russia were much lower due to steep discounts and lower prices on the global market, but as India had expanded its capabilities in oil refining and re-exporting particularly diesel fuel to Europe, this development had again been interpreted by Western nations as a problematic breach of international sanctions they impose to curtail Russia's ambitions during the war in Ukraine. About 57% of Russia's export revenues are based on sales of crude, and it aims to further expand that market to nations in Africa as well as South America in the coming years. Research has shown that such third-country relationships significantly mitigate the welfare losses for Russia while amplifying losses for sanctioning countries, highlighting the challenges in maintaining effective international sanctions coordination.

==== 2024 ====
Following the implementation of international sanctions during Russia's invasion of Ukraine, China provided economic relief to Russia. In 2022, China accounted for 40% of Russia's imports. In 2023, China's total trade with Russia reached a record $240 billion. Russia's dependence on the Chinese yuan increased heavily after its invasion of Ukraine in 2022. However, by August 2024, Russian transactions with Chinese banks (especially smaller ones) were largely closed. Due to strict secondary sanctions, Russia could not exchange money with China. As many as 98% of Chinese banks rejected direct yuan payments from Russia.

In April 2024, the United States and the United Kingdom announced a ban on imports of Russian aluminum, copper, and nickel. Due to sanctions, Russian nickel, copper and palladium mining and smelting company Norilsk Nickel planned to move some of its copper smelting to China and establish a joint venture with a Chinese company. Finished copper products would be sold as Chinese products to avoid Western sanctions. China is Norilsk Nickel's largest export market from 2023. Nickel is a critical metal in electric vehicle batteries and palladium is critical element in catalytic converters, a component in natural gas vehicles.

By late 2023, Russian LNG sales to Europe started to pick up again, and in October 2024, Russia surpassed the U.S. with supplying the energy resource to Europe. Despite falling demand for gas and oil in Western Europe due to economic decline, Russia was able to at least partially compensate for its losses as a result of suspected sabotage in the Nord Stream 1 & 2 pipelines. While Western Europe overall managed to abstain from Russian energy, the situation looks considerably different for Eastern and Central Europe. Slovakia, Hungary, and Austria still rely heavily on pipelined Russian gas now accessed through Turkey while other European countries with maritime access have imported more Russian LNG. Another crucial factor for the choice of Russian gas is its price and the steep discount offered by Russian energy traders. As a result, the U.S. extended its secondary sanctions policies to a number of countries, including India, China, the United Arab Emirates, Turkey, Thailand, Malaysia, Switzerland, among others.

==== 2025-2026 ====
In late 2025 and early 2026, the Russian economy could improve in terms of fossil fuel exports to Asia, and later because of energy price increases as a result of the 2026 Iran war. Particularly fertilizer dominance by Russia is positive for its economy, yet overall price increases for Russian commodities did not have the expected effects on the local economy. Drone attacks by Ukraine were also stated as a main reason for the shortage of Russian energy products and other commodities.

In June 2026, the United States House of Representatives passed a bill to provide additional aid to Ukraine and impose new sanctions on Russia. The bill passed by a vote of 226–195, with several Republicans joining Democrats in support. It includes over $1 billion in direct assistance for Ukraine and authorizes up to $8 billion in loans for defense and reconstruction. The legislation also places sanctions on key sectors of the Russian economy, including financial institutions, energy, and mining. The bill was brought to a vote through a discharge petition after months of delay. The measure still requires approval by the Senate.

As of June 2026, Western sanctions have cost Russia an estimated €1 to 1.3 trillion according to an estimate by EU High Representative for Foreign Affairs and Security Policy Kaja Kallas.

=== Effects on US and EU countries ===
==== 2014-2021 ====
As of 2015, the losses of EU have been estimated as at least €100 billion. The German business sector, with around 30,000 jobs dependent on trade with the Russian Federation, also reported being affected significantly by the sanctions. The sanctions affected numerous European market sectors, including energy, agriculture, and aviation among others. In March 2016, the Finnish farmers' union MTK stated that the Russian sanctions and falling prices have put farmers under tremendous pressure. Finland's Natural Resources Institute LUKE has estimated that in 2015, farmers saw their incomes shrink by at least 40 percent compared to the previous year.

In February 2015, ExxonMobil reported losing about $1 billion due to Russian sanctions.

In 2017, the UN Special Rapporteur Idriss Jazairy published a report on the impact of sanctions, stating that the EU countries were losing about "3.2 billion dollars a month" due to them. He also noted that the sanctions were "intended to serve as a deterrent to Russia but run the risk of being only a deterrent to the international business community, while adversely affecting only those vulnerable groups which have nothing to do with the crisis" (especially people in Crimea, who "should not be made to pay collectively for what is a complex political crisis over which they have no control").

==== 2022–present ====
In May 2022, the EU decided to partially ban Russian oil imports, except those obtained through pipelines via Hungary, Slovakia and the Czech Republic until the end of 2022. Crude oil prices again jumped as supplies for fossil fuels remained constrained; the decision by the European Council exacerbated worries about an already-tight energy market. Besides Hungary, which gained significant exemptions from the oil embargo, Italy was also initially an opponent of such sanctions. The EU oil embargo is now putting at risk one of Italy's largest refineries, located in Sicily's Province of Syracuse.

The detrimental effects on European countries from economic sanctions against Russia had been initially valued as not significant compared to the impact these measures have on the Russian economy. However, after 2022, a number of economists have pointed out that Eastern European countries with more intense economic relations with Russia (and Ukraine) before the conflict, would experience more disruptions to their economies. These 'asymmetric effects' might be considerable, particularly for smaller countries with domestic production, as these international sanctions not only affected the energy industry but also agriculture and manufacturing, as well as the financial sector. After the onset of the armed conflict in 2022, energy prices had skyrocketed, contributing to the 2021/2022 energy crisis. While those energy prices in 2023 had fallen again and shortages, particularly for LNG had eased, other factors came into play, such as the serious disruption of grain exports through the Black Sea corridor, thus causing a glut of grain in Eastern Europe, depressing prices seriously and endangering the livelihood of local farmers in Poland, Hungary as well as Bulgaria.

In contrast, economic sanctions against Russia's petrochemical industry have benefited the U.S. energy economy, while Europe was impacted negatively. Exports of American LNG to Europe have more than doubled since 2021. According to the International Energy Agency, US shipments of natural gas to Europe in June 2022 exceeded the amount Russia was supplying via pipelines. In late 2022, German Economy Minister Robert Habeck accused the US and other "friendly" gas supplier nations from profiting in the Ukraine war with "astronomical prices". He called for more solidarity by the US to assist energy-pressed allies, and to reverse the economic decline in Europe.

According to the Financial Times, European companies had lost at least €200 billion in 2022 in Germany alone due to reduced profits from sanctions in the automobile, energy and chemical sectors. The German chemical sector by itself experienced a current decline of 25% in 2023, after a still smaller decline of 8.5% in 2022.

In September 2023, the Dutch shipyard Damen Group has initiated a lawsuit against the government of the Netherlands for losses inflicted by these measures. The cancellation of contracts from Russian clients had significantly impacted the business environment for many shipbuilders. The financial setbacks for that industry stems from the severance of ties with its Russian engineering branch, according to the statement.

By 2025–2026, Europe’s access to low-cost Russian energy ended due to expiring transit contracts, reducing pipeline reliance to 6%, and a strategic shift toward expensive U.S. LNG imports. This transition triggered massive industrial cost pressures, including a 20% drop in gas demand and significant German industrial output declines. The 2026 war with Iran further accelerated energy costs in Europe that could not be replaced by costly transcontinental imports.

=== Effect on global food supply ===
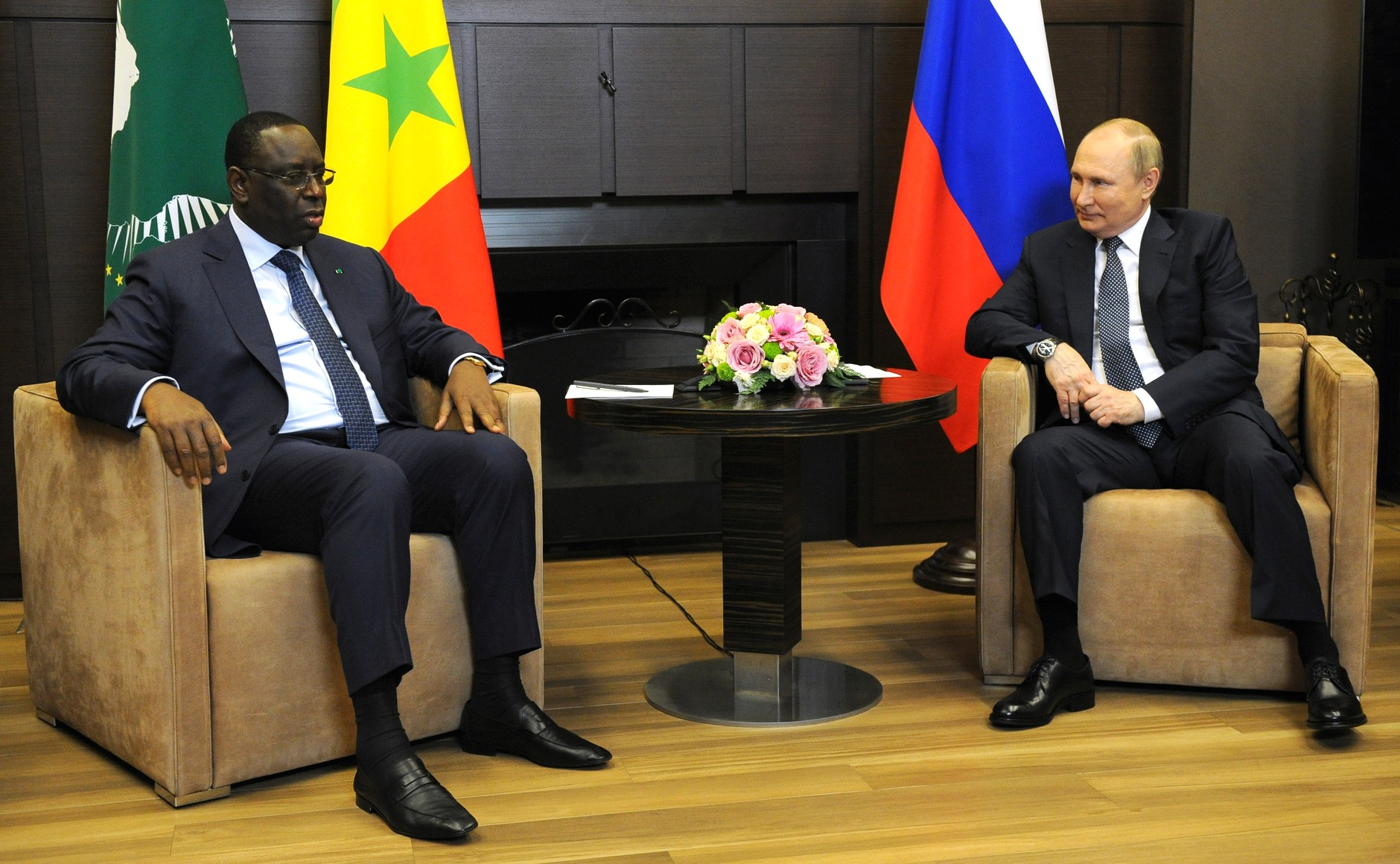
Vladimir Putin meets the President of the African Union, Macky Sall, in Sochi to discuss grain deliveries from Russia and Ukraine to Africa, 3 June 2022

Western countries have accused Russia to interfere with wheat exports from Ukraine due to armed confrontations in Odesa and other Ukrainian ports. Later the Kremlin pushed back and accused the West of imposing sanctions on the Russian economy that hinder the export of wheat from the Russian Federation. Spokesperson Dmitry Peskov referred to Russia as "a rather reliable grain exporter". During a meeting with Italian Prime Minister Mario Draghi, Putin confirmed Russia's willingness to make "a significant contribution to overcoming the food crisis through the export of grain and fertilizer" but mentioned Western sanctions as the caveat.

The head of the African Union, Senegalese President Macky Sall, remarked that the side effects of the EU's decision to expel many Russian banks from SWIFT will hurt the ability of African countries to pay for imported food and fertilizers from Russia. French President Emmanuel Macron responded that difficulties have nothing to do with EU sanctions.

On 22 July 2022, the Black Sea Grain Initiative was signed. The facilitated exports of Ukrainian grain via the Black Sea amid the ongoing war has been described as "a beacon of hope" by the UN Secretary-General António Guterres during the signing ceremony in Istanbul.

On 14 September 2022, UN Secretary-General Antonio Guterres reiterated his concerns over a constrained fertilizer supply from Russia due to the 2022 Russian invasion of Ukraine and subsequent economic sanctions. According to the source, UN diplomats held discussions to re-open the Togliatti-Odesa pipeline carrying ammonia. President Volodymyr Zelenskyy had offered such a move in exchange for the release of prisoners of war held by Russia. But TASS news agency quoted Kremlin spokesman Dmitry Peskov, who dismissed such an idea, as saying "are people and ammonia the same thing?". The pipeline remained unused.

At the 38th meeting of the Standing Committee for Economic and Commercial Cooperation (COMCEC) of the Organization of Islamic Cooperation (OIC) in Istanbul, Erdogan remarked that over 11 million tonnes of grain had been transported through the Black Sea Grain Corridor since the successful implementation of the Black Sea Grain Initiative. He also noted that the opening of the grain corridor through the Black Sea showed that a diplomatic solution is possible in the conflict between Russia and Ukraine.

In July 2023 Russia refused to renew the Black Sea Grain Initiative which had transported 33 million tonnes of grain and other food products on 1,000 ships.

=== Other effects ===
==== Shifting to safe havens ====
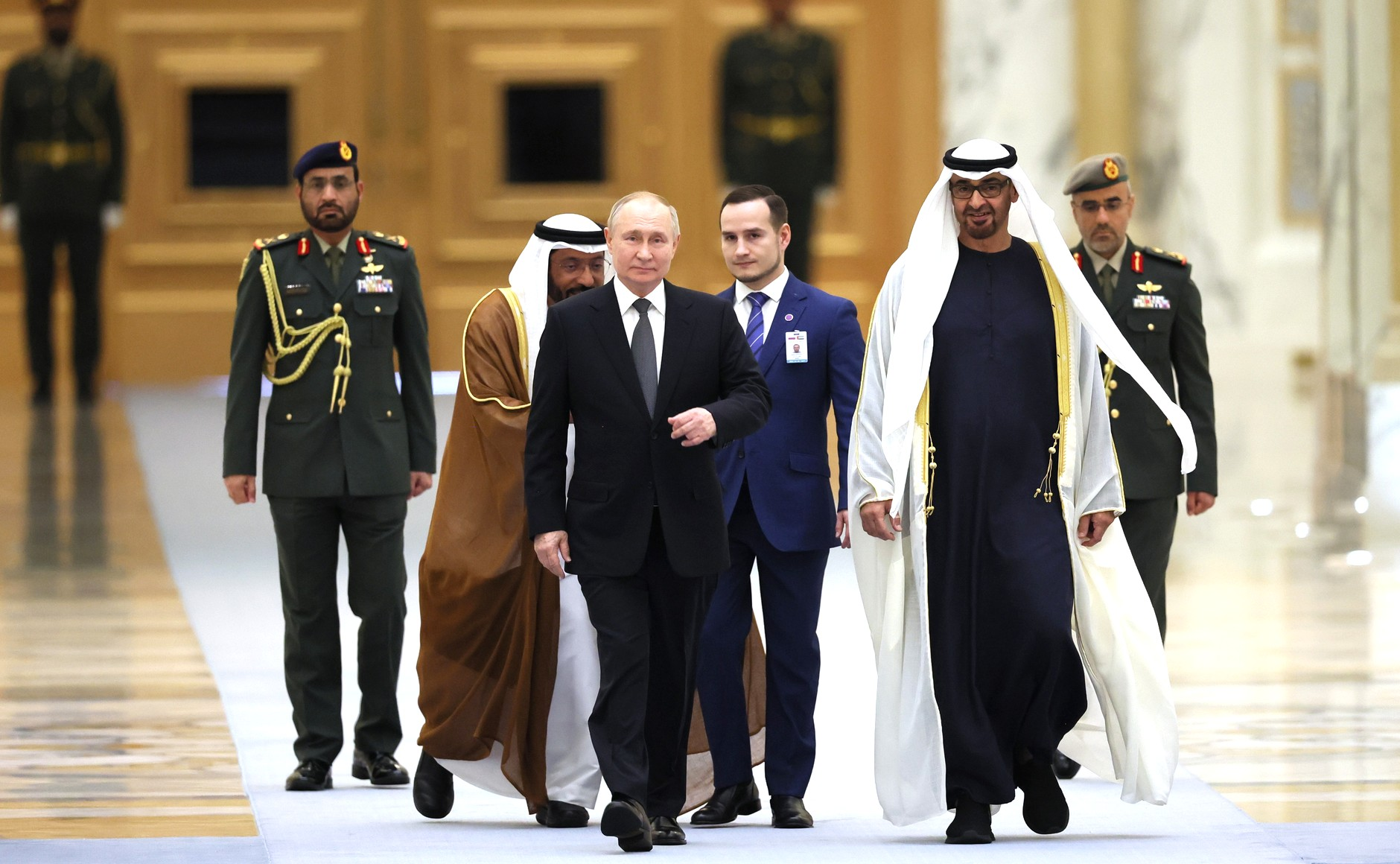
Russian President Vladimir Putin with UAE's President Mohamed bin Zayed Al Nahyan in Abu Dhabi, UAE, 6 December 2023

Under the sanctions imposed by the US and the European Union, Russian oligarchs began looking for safe havens financially. Many of them moved their wealth to countries like the United Arab Emirates (UAE), which could not match the Western sanctions. Investigations spotted a number of superyachts moored in Dubai and the Maldives. Private jets owned by these oligarchs were also tracked flying back and forth from Moscow to Dubai and Israel. The Russian elites have been shifting funds worth hundreds of millions of dollars from sanctioning countries like the UK and Switzerland to countries that do not impose sanctions like the UAE. Russian oligarchs facing sanctions from the West were not just seeking to buy properties in the UAE, but for long-term residence. Analysts assessed that these billionaires could avail the service of the Emirates' "golden visa" program by investing at least $2.7 million in a local company or investment fund. The golden visa program could allow these oligarchs to live, work, and study in the UAE with full ownership of their business.

The shifting to safe havens also involves large gold sales that are now conducted through the UAE first before reaching other destinations. Due to the flexibility of gold transactions, and the ability to re-issue gold certificates as well as gold bullions, it is practically impossible to control the flow of gold from sanctioned entities. Even when gold-rich countries, such as Switzerland had adhered to EU sanctions, and no longer import gold directly from Russia, the trade with such commodities among others, actually increased for 2022 and early 2023. Furthermore, both China and Russia had increased their gold reserves considerably, even before the onset of the hostilities between Russia and Ukraine, driving up the gold price. As the gold trade became less transparent due to the sanctions imposed on Russia, economic effects of such transactions are now much more difficult to predict.

==== Space ====
Continued international collaboration on the operation of and missions to the International Space Station (ISS) has been thrown into doubt, although Russia has continued with resupply missions and crew to the ISS.

==== Environmental effects ====
Scientists suggest the sanctions could be used to accelerate the renewable energy transition/decarbonization (i.e. for Russian fossil fuels sanctions and due to e.g. increased public acceptance of increased energy prices, unconventional energy transition efforts and uncomfortable energy conservation measures).

Europe's ending dependence on Russian fossil fuels lead to a push for energy independence via renewables. For some countries, such as Austria, however, with less alternative energy resources, the exit from Russian gas supplies has been difficult. In 2022/23 Austria imported the same amounts of liquified gas as before the Russian invasion of the Ukraine. Hungary also continues to obtain the same amount of gas as before the onset of the war but due to the fact that direct transfers from Ukraine were halted in summer 2023, it will import Russian gas via the TurkStream pipeline after October 1, 2023.

Secretary-general of the United Nations António Guterres stated that "instead of hitting the brakes on the decarbonization of the global economy, now is the time to put the pedal to the metal towards a renewable energy future."

Some political policy-makers in Europe have made decisions to replace Russian fossil fuel imports with other fossil fuels imports and small temporary increases in European coal energy production and to assist people with high fossil fuel prices.

Economic sanctions during the Russo-Ukrainian war have accelerated a temporary use of coal in energy production worldwide. Soaring natural gas prices have made coal more competitive in many markets, and some nations have resorted to coal as a substitute for potential energy rationing in winter 2022/23. With demand for coal increasing in Asia and Europe, global coal consumption is forecast to rise a minimal amount in 2022. Burning coal or petroleum products emits significantly higher amounts of carbon dioxide and air pollutants compared to natural gas. The return to coal fills the energy gap before transition to greener and more sustainable energy sources.

Europe could see a drop in fossil fuel power generation of 20% in 2023 as a large boost has been given to finding and speeding up renewable energy sources and for some EU countries, continuing longer with nuclear power. The falls being in coal and gas generation with the EU determined to phase out coal quickly as planned and to now phase out gas.

== Enforcement efforts ==
The legal framework of sanctions varies across jurisdictions, including the means of enforcement and compliance.

=== Multilateral cooperation ===
On February 26, 2022, the leaders of the European Commission, France, Germany, Italy, the United Kingdom, Canada, and the United States released "Joint Statement on Further Restrictive Economic Measures," committing to the launch of "a transatlantic task force that will ensure the effective implementation of our financial sanctions by identifying and freezing the assets of sanctioned individuals and companies that exist within our jurisdictions."

On March 16, 2022, financial intelligence units of Australia, Canada, France, Germany, Italy, Japan, the Netherlands, New Zealand, the United Kingdom, and the United States signed a joint letter of intent forming a working group to "enhance, expedite and engage" in coordinated efforts related to sanctions and asset recovery.

The same day, Janet Yellen and Merrick Garland announced the formation of the Russian Elites, Proxies, and Oligarchs (REPO) Task Force with the participation of relevant ministries from Australia, Canada, the European Commission, Germany, Italy, France, Japan, the UK. The Task Force members agree to collect and sharing information to take concrete action including sanctions, asset freezing, and civil and criminal asset seizure, and criminal prosecution.

=== FinCEN advisories for international banking and finance ===
Though it is a United States regulatory entity, the Financial Crimes Enforcement Network is a de facto international regulator due to the dominance of the American dollar and resultant use of U.S.-based correspondent accounts. In March 2022, FinCEN released two "Alerts" intended to instruct institutions on sanctions compliance. Each included several possible "flags" for a suspicious activity report under the Bank Secrecy Act for sanctions avoidance.

FIN-2022-Alert001 "FinCEN Advises Increased Vigilance for Potential Russian Sanctions Evasion Attempts"

- Sanctions Evasion Attempts Using the U.S. Financial System
- Sanctions Evasion Using Convertible Virtual Currency (CVC)
- Possible Ransomware Attacks and Other Cybercrime

FIN-2022-Alert002 "FinCEN Alert on Real Estate, Luxury Goods, and Other High Value Assets Involving Russian Elites, Oligarchs, and their Family Members"

- Real Estate
- Artworks
- Precious Metals, Stones, and Jewelry (PMSJs)
- Other High-Value Assets

=== Enforcement activities of the United States ===
The primary United States sanctions law, International Emergency Economic Powers Act (IEEPA), permits the President (via the Treasury) to block (or "freeze") a designated foreign person or entity's assets. The law also prohibits any United States person from transacting business with the designated foreign person or entity. Specifically, 50 U.S.C. § 1705 criminalizes activities that "violate, attempt to violate, conspire to violate, or cause a violation of any license, order, regulation, or prohibition," and allows for fines up to $1,000,000, imprisonment up to 20 years, or both. Additionally, United States asset forfeiture laws allow for the seizure of assets considered to be the proceeds of criminal activity.

On 3 February 2022, John "Jack" Hanick was arrested in London for violating sanctions against Konstantin Malofeev, owner of Tsargrad TV. Malofeev is targeted for sanctions by the European Union and United States for material and financial support to Donbass separatists. (Note: Through Malofeev, Hanick is close to the pro Russia former Greek defense minister Panos Kammenos and Vladimir Putin gives carte blanche to Tsargrad TV which according to Malofeev is the Russian equivalent to Fox News.) Hanick was the first person criminally indicted for violating United States sanctions during the War in Ukraine.

According to court records, Hanick has been under sealed indictment in the United States District Court for the Southern District of New York since November 2021. The indictment was unsealed March 3, 2022. Hanick awaits extradition from the United Kingdom to the United States.

Footage from the 4 April 2022 seizure of the Motoryacht Tango in Palma de Mallorca from a warrant executed by Guardia Civil, Homeland Security Investigations and Federal Bureau of Investigation

United States Attorney General Merrick B. Garland announces the seizure of the Motoryacht Tango on 4 April 2022.

In the March 1, 2022 State of the Union Address, American President Joe Biden announced an effort to target the wealth of Russian oligarchs.

Tonight, I say to the Russian oligarchs and the corrupt leaders who've bilked billions of dollars off this violent regime: No more.

The United States — I mean it. The United States Department of Justice is assembling a dedicated task force to go after the crimes of the Russian oligarchs.

We're joining with European Allies to find and seize their yachts, their luxury apartments, their private jets. We're coming for your ill-begotten gains.

On March 2, 2022, U.S. Attorney General Merrick B. Garland announced the formation of Task Force KleptoCapture, an inter-agency effort.

On March 11, 2022, United States President Joe Biden signed Executive Order 14068, "Prohibiting Certain Imports, Exports, and New Investment With Respect to Continued Russian Federation Aggression," an order of economic sanctions under the United States International Emergency Economic Powers Act against several oligarchs. The order targeted two properties of Viktor Vekselberg worth an estimated $180 million: an Airbus A319-115 jet and the motoryacht Tango. Estimates of the value of the Tango range from $90 million (U.S. Department of Justice estimate) to $120 million (from the website Superyachtfan.com).

On April 4, 2022, the yacht was seized by Civil Guard of Spain and U.S. federal agents in Mallorca. A United States Department of Justice press release states that the seizure of the Tango was by request of Task Force KleptoCapture, an interagency task force operated through the U.S. Deputy Attorney General. The matter is pending in the United States District Court for the District of Columbia. The affidavit for the seizure warrant states that the yacht is seized on probable cause to suspect violations of 18 U.S.C. § 1349 (conspiracy to commit bank fraud), 50 U.S.C. § 1705 (International Emergency Economic Powers Act), and 18 U.S.C. § 1956 (money laundering), and as authorized by American statutes on civil and criminal asset forfeiture.

On 6 April 2022, the United States Department of Justice unsealed a 2021 criminal indictment of Konstantin Malofeev on the charges of making false statements (18 U.S.C. § 1001), violating United States sanctions under IEEPA (50 U.S.C. § 1705) as well as the derivative regulations of Executive Order 13660, Executive Order 13661, and Executive Order 13662, and 31 CFR 589.201. The Department of Justice states that Malofeyev is the first sanctioned oligarch that the United States have charged.

=== Maritime enforcement actions ===
In May 2026, the French Navy seized the oil tanker Tagor in the Atlantic Ocean in international waters more than 400 nautical miles west of Brittany, with support from the United Kingdom. The vessel had departed from Murmansk, Russia, and was subject to international sanctions. French authorities said it was suspected of operating under a false flag and was escorted for inspection. France opened an investigation into alleged violations of maritime regulations. Russia condemned the seizure as illegal, describing it as “international piracy.”

== Russian counter-sanctions ==
=== 2014 ===
Three days after the first sanctions against Russia, on 20 March 2014, the Russian Foreign Ministry published a list of reciprocal sanctions against certain American citizens, which consisted of ten names, including Speaker of the House of Representatives John Boehner, Senator John McCain, and two advisers to Barack Obama. The ministry said in the statement, "Treating our country in such way, as Washington could have already ascertained, is inappropriate and counterproductive", and reiterated that sanctions against Russia would have a boomerang effect. On 24 March, Russia banned thirteen Canadian officials, including members of the Parliament of Canada, from entering the country.

On 6 August 2014, Putin signed a decree "On the use of specific economic measures", which mandated an effective embargo for a one-year period on imports of most of the agricultural products whose country of origin had either "adopted the decision on introduction of economic sanctions in respect of Russian legal and (or) physical entities, or joined same". The next day, the Russian government ordinance was adopted and published with immediate effect, which specified the banned items as well as the countries of provenance: the United States, the European Union, Norway, Canada and Australia, including a ban on fruit, vegetables, meat, fish, milk and dairy imports. Prior to the embargo, food exports from the EU to Russia were worth around €11.8 billion, or 10% of the total EU exports to Russia. Food exports from the United States to Russia were worth around €972 million. Food exports from Canada were worth around €385 million. Food exports from Australia, mainly meat and live cattle, were worth around €170 million per year.

On August 7, 2014, Russia had previously taken a position that it would not engage in "tit-for-tat" sanctions, but, announcing the embargo, Russian prime minister Dmitry Medvedev said,

"There is nothing good in sanctions and it was not an easy decision to take, but we had to do it." He indicated that sanctions relating to the transport manufacturing sector were also being considered. United States Treasury spokesperson David Cohen said that sanctions affecting access to food were "not something that the US and its allies would ever do".

On the same day, Russia announced a ban on the use of its airspace by Ukrainian aircraft.

=== 2015 ===
In January 2015, it became clear that Russian authorities would not allow a Member of the European Parliament, Lithuanian MEP Gabrielius Landsbergis, to make a visit to Moscow due to political reasons.

In March 2015, Latvian MEP Sandra Kalniete and Speaker of the Polish Senate Bogdan Borusewicz were both denied entry into Russia under the existing sanctions regime, and were thus unable to attend the funeral of murdered opposition politician Boris Nemtsov.

On June 5, 2015, Russian government has "termporarily" banned Latvian and Estonian canned fish products citing "health" concerns. Half of the countries' exports share accounted for Russia.

After a member of the German Bundestag was denied entry into Russia in May 2015, Russia released a blacklist to EU authorities of 89 politicians and officials from the EU who are not allowed entry into Russia under the present sanctions regime. Russia asked for the blacklist to not be made public. The list is said to include eight Swedes, as well as two MPs and two MEPs from the Netherlands. Finland's national broadcaster Yle published a leaked German version of the list.

In response to this publication, British politician Malcolm Rifkind (whose name was included on the Russian list) commented: "It shows we are making an impact because they wouldn't have reacted unless they felt very sore at what had happened. Once sanctions were extended, they've had a major impact on the Russian economy. This happened at a time when the oil price had collapsed and therefore a main source of revenue for the Russian Federation disappeared". Another person on the list, Swedish MEP Gunnar Hökmark, remarked that he was proud to be on the list and said "a regime that does this does it because it is afraid, and at heart it is weak".

On May 15, 2015, with regard to Russia's entry ban on European politicians, a spokesperson from the European Commission said,

"The list with 89 names has now been shared by the Russian authorities. We don't have any other information on legal basis, criteria and process of this decision. We consider this measure as totally arbitrary and unjustified, especially in the absence of any further clarification and transparency."

=== 2016–2021 ===
On 29 June 2016, Russian president Vladimir Putin signed a decree that extended the embargo on the countries already sanctioned until 31 December 2017.

According to a 2020 study, the Russian counter-sanctions did not just serve Russia's foreign policy goals, but also facilitated Russia's protectionist policy. As a result of counter-sanctions, combined with government support of domestic agricultural production, production of grain, chicken, pork, cheese and other agricultural products has increased. Russia's food imports fell from 35% in 2013 to only 20% in 2018. The prices on these products have also risen dramatically though. In Moscow, from September 2014 to September 2018, the average price of cheese increased by 23%, milk by 35.7%, vegetable oil by 65%.

=== 2022–2023 ===
On 3 May 2022, Russia's president Putin signed a decree instructing the Russia government to create within 10 days, a list of sanctioned entities to whom exports of products and raw materials will be forbidden. This decree was described as "the Kremlin's toughest economic response" since a 31 March decree changing the payment schemes of natural gas contracts and Gazprom's halting of natural gas deliveries to Bulgaria and Poland on 27 April.

In July 2023 Russia made a decree that companies from the "Unfriendly Countries List" leaving Russia must sell their assets to Russian buyers at a 50% discount and in addition, must pay a 10% tax levy of at least 10% of the transaction price. The decree also bans including buyback options.

=== 2024 ===
On 25 June 2024, Russia announced ban on access to broadcasts from 81 European Union media outlets, including Agence France-Presse and Politico, in response to the EU's ban on several Russian media outlets. In May 2024, the EU suspended the distribution of four media outlets it labelled "Kremlin-linked propaganda networks," targeting Voice of Europe, RIA news agency, and the Izvestia and Rossiyskaya Gazeta newspapers. In retaliation, the Russian Foreign Ministry published a list of 81 media outlets from 25 EU member states and Pan-European outlets that would be banned in Russia, accusing them of spreading inaccurate information about Russia's military actions in Ukraine. Affected outlets included Agence France-Presse, ORF, Raidió Teilifís Éireann, Politico, and EFE, among others. The ministry stated that the EU's politically motivated actions against Russian media had led to this countermeasure and hinted at a possible review if the EU lifted its restrictions on Russian media. Italian media and officials condemned Russia's decision, calling it unjustified. Politico's Editor-in-Chief for Europe, Jamil Anderlini, also criticized the move, calling for the lifting of restrictions and the release of Evan Gershkovich, who was set to stand trial in Russia on espionage charges.

== Russian shadow fleet ==
The Russian shadow fleet is a complex multi-dimensional maritime phenomenon, which greatly challenges the existing ocean governance, and acts as a method of avoiding the comprehensive sanctions imposed on Russia from 2022. Although Shadow Fleets are no new phenomena, the use of shadow fleets to counter foreign sanctions have gained widespread attention following the 2022 Russian invasion of Ukraine. In order to keep the Russian economy floating, a complex web of shadow fleet vessels has been implemented to maintain an important position on the world’s energy markets.

The Russian Shadow Fleet has become one of Moscow’s most important strategic weapons in the ongoing economic conflict between Russia and the West, and has, so far, proven itself successful. A success, which can be attributed to the use of specific evasive methods, which make the shadow fleet particularly difficult to detect and regulate. Among these methods, the most widely identified include foreign companies taking over former Russian registered vessels, with the purpose of reregistering and reflagging them. The complex ownership setup of these private actors has made monitoring the reregistrations extremely difficult, especially when combined with the fact that not all registries are public. In addition to acquiring former Russian Tankers, acquiring other, often outdated vessels has become an important part of the shadow fleet. Reregistration often happens in what the literature has coined “flags of convenience”, understood as flags belonging to states that have little or no requirements for ships under their registry, hence regulatory oversight on these countries remain limited and difficult. Of the Shadow fleet vessels that are known to the West, most are registered in third world, low income nations including, among others but not limited to, Gabon, the Marshall Islands and Panama. This lack of regulatory oversight remains the primary problem in identifying Shadow fleet vessels currently sailing the World Seas. It is no coincidence that these flags of convenience have been chosen, as the host nations often, apart from having next to no requirements, have economic difficulties, making the open registries an easy source of income.

When using the shadow fleet actively as a method of evading sanctions, and with the widely accepted success that the shadow fleet has, one specific question arises: what can then be done? Although the ecological and judicial impact of these older vessels is known, the geopolitical focus on sanctions targeting the shadow fleet has been given little literary attention. This includes both the monitoring mechanism, as well as the recent use of secondary sanctions.

Secondary sanctions are designed to target non-Russian actors who actively contribute to the Russian economy through the shadow fleet. The use of secondary sanctions can be seen as an attempt to counter the sanctions evasion that the shadow fleet attempts and can be understood as an attempt to target those who assist Russia in circumnavigation sanctions. Until the Russian invasion of Ukraine in 2022, the EU was sceptical about the prospect and possible consequences of implementing secondary sanctions, although these have now been implemented alongside existing sanctions on Russia. The use of Secondary sanctions is, however, just one of a few different geopolitical methods the EU has used in order to stop the Russian Shadow fleet from operating. Among other methods can be mentioned is the continued monitoring of suspicious vessels, this including more rigid insurance demands and vessel listing. Furthermore, putting pressure on the open registries judicially through the UNCLOS regulatory framework, might be a useful approach for foreign policy makers, as well as attempting bargaining approaches with the open registries, making it economically efficient to tighten the regulatory oversight. Although the regulatory framework is in place, and widely agreed, the lack of regulatory oversight remains the main problem in counteracting the shadow fleet, which can be attributed to multiple factors, including poverty, economic difficulty, and a lack of research and focus on how the shadow fleet provides an easy source of income for third world countries.

== See also ==
- Confiscation of Russian central bank funds
- Countering America's Adversaries Through Sanctions Act (US)
- Specially Designated Nationals and Blocked Persons List (US)
- International Emergency Economic Powers Act (US)
- International sanctions during apartheid
- International sanctions during the Russian invasion of Ukraine
- International sanctions during the Venezuelan crisis
- International Sponsors of War
- List of companies that applied sanctions during the Russo-Ukrainian War
- List of military aid to Ukraine during the Russo-Ukrainian War
- Russian financial crisis (2014–2016)
- Yachts impacted by international sanctions following the Russian invasion of Ukraine
