= Ivanna Klympush-Tsintsadze =

Ukrainian politician and journalist

- Іванна Климпуш-Цинцадзе
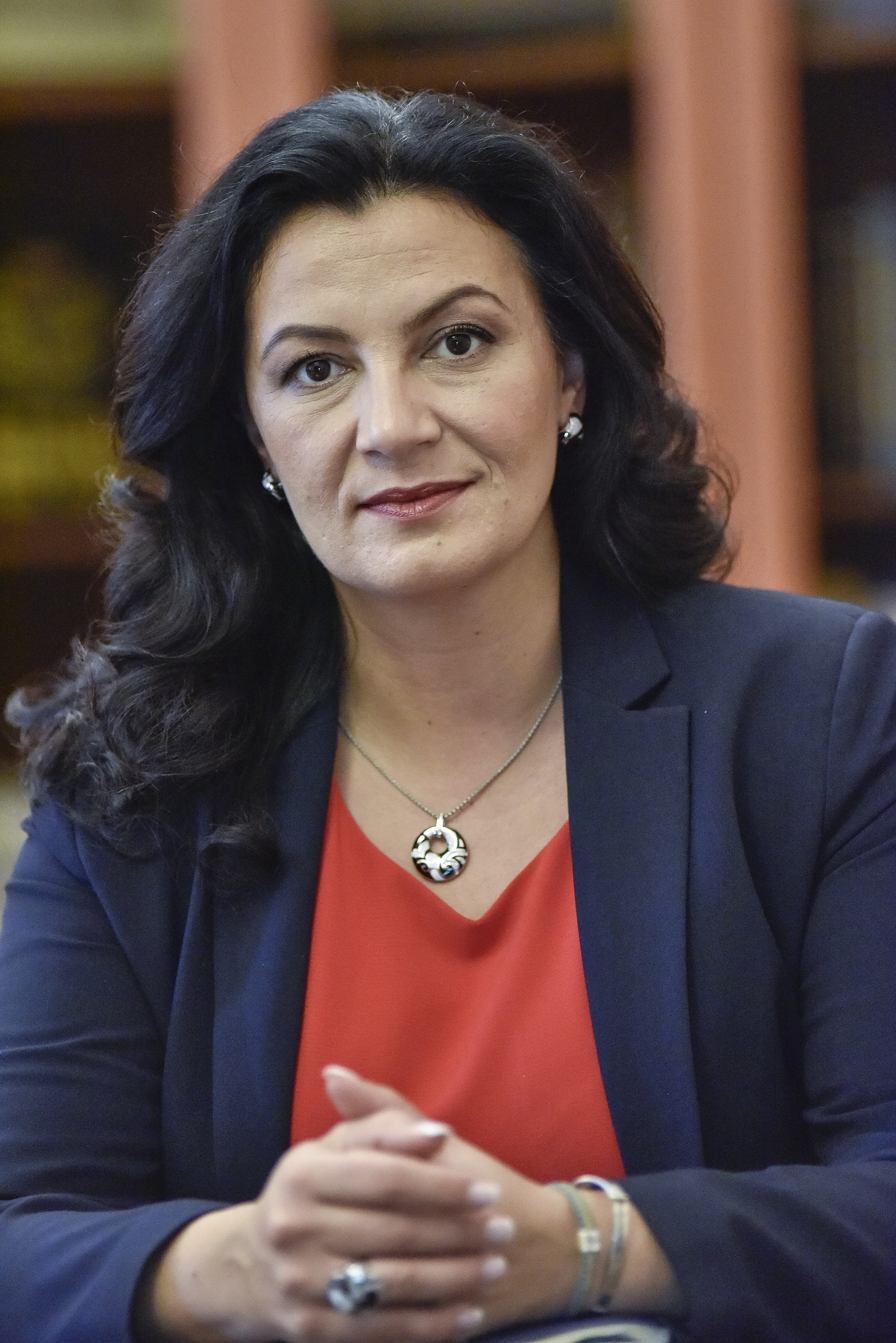
- Klympush-Tsintsadze in 2017

Vice Prime Minister of Ukraine on matters of European integration
- In office 14 April 2016 – 29 August 2019
- President: Petro Poroshenko; Volodymyr Zelenskyy
- Prime Minister: Volodymyr Groysman
- Preceded by: Hryhoriy Nemyria
- Succeeded by: Dmytro Kuleba

Personal details
- Born: Ivanna Orestivna Klympush; 5 July 1972 (age 54) Kyiv, Ukrainian SSR, Soviet Union (now Ukraine)
- Party: Petro Poroshenko Bloc
- Education: Harvard University; National Pedagogical Drahomanov University; University of Montana; Taras Shevchenko National University of Kyiv

Ivanna Orestivna Klympush-Tsintsadze (Ukrainian: Іванна Орестівна Климпуш-Цинцадзе; born 5 July 1972) is a Ukrainian politician and journalist, and former Vice-Prime-Minister for European and Euro-Atlantic Integration of Ukraine. She was elected into the Verkhovna Rada in 2016 and 2019.

== Early life ==
Ivanna Klympush-Tsintsadze was born on 5 July 1972 in Kyiv, Ukraine. She is the daughter of Yaroslava Klympush and Orest Klympush.

== Education ==
1992 – trained at the Summer School of Harvard Ukrainian Research Institute, Harvard University (USA).

1994 – graduated from the National Pedagogical Drahomanov University, a speciality – defectology and speech therapy. Has received diploma of the specialist (with honors).

1993–1994 – studied at the University of Montana, speciality – international relations and international law.

1997 – graduated from the Institute of International Relations of Taras Shevchenko National University of Kyiv with a degree in international relations and received a bachelor's degree in international relations.

1998 – received a master's degree in International Relations (with honors).

== Career ==
1991–1993 – Speech therapist at the Children's Territorial Medical Association of Starokyivsky District;

1994–1999 – Project Manager, Head of the Department of International Relations, NGO 'Ukrainian Independent Center for Political Studies';

1999–2002 – Project Manager at 'Kyiv Center of the East-West Institute';

2001–2002 – Acting Director of the 'Kyiv Center of the East-West Institute';

2002–2007 – Correspondent in the Ukrainian BBC Radio Service (BBC) in US (Washington) and in the Caucasus (Tbilisi);

2007–2009 – Deputy Director for Programs of the International Charitable Organization 'Fund for Support of International Cooperation of Ukraine' ('Open Ukraine Foundation');

2009–2011 – Director of the International Charitable Organization "Fund for Support of International Cooperation of Ukraine" ("Open Ukraine Foundation");

Since 2011 – Director of charitable organization 'Yalta European Strategy';

In 1994–99 Ivanna Klympush worked for the Ukrainian Independent Center of Political Research, while attending the Institute of International Relations in University of Kyiv which she graduated in 1998.

board member of the Public Organization 'Ukrainian Media Center' ('Ukrainian Crisis Media Center'); Alumni of 'Aspen-Ukraine' Association; Member of supervisory boards of the NGO 'Institute for Economic Research and Policy Consulting' and NGO 'Ukrainian Institute of Public Policy'.

Co-author of the book 'The Black Sea Region: Cooperation and Security'.

== Parliamentary background ==
During the elections to the Verkhovna Rada of the VIII convocation (2014) she passed to the Parliament from the party Petro Poroshenko Bloc 'The Solidarity' under the number 61. She was MP from 27 November 2014 to 14 April 2016.

In the July 2019 Ukrainian parliamentary election Klympush-Tsintsadze was placed tenth on the party list of European Solidarity. She was elected to parliament.

== Government background ==
On 14 April 2016, Ukrainian Parliament appointed a new Cabinet of Ministers of Ukraine, where Ivanna Klympush-Tsintsadze got the position of Vice Prime Minister for European and Euro-Atlantic Integration.

On 18 April 2016, the Cabinet of Ministers of Ukraine appointed Ivanna Klympush-Tsintsadze, Vice Prime Minister for European and Euro-Atlantic Integration, responsible for Ukraine's international relations and European integration (Resolution of the Cabinet of Ministers of Ukraine No. 296 dated 18 April 2016).

- First Vice Chairwoman of the Committee on Foreign Affairs of the Verkhovna Rada of Ukraine;
- Chairwoman of the Permanent Delegation to Ukraine of the Parliamentary Assembly of NATO;
- Member of the Ukrainian part of the Parliamentary Association Committee;
- Head of Inter-Parliamentary Group of Friends "Ukraine-EU";
- Head of the Group on Inter-Parliamentary Relations with Georgia;
- First Vice Co-Chair of the Inter-Parliamentary Relations Unit with the United States of America;
- Member of the Inter-Parliamentary Relations Group with the Republic of India;
- Member of the Inter-Parliamentary Relations Group with the Federal Republic of Germany;
- Member of the Inter-Parliamentary Relations Group with Canada;
- Member of the Inter-Parliamentary Relations Unit with the United Kingdom of Great Britain and Northern Ireland;
- Member of the Inter-Parliamentary Relations Group with the Republic of Poland.

24 November 2016 Ivanna Klympush-Tsintsadze and Johannes Hahn (European Commissioner for Neighbourhood and Enlargement Negotiations) signed the agreement on financing the EUACI.

Since August 29, 2019, he has been a People's Deputy of the Verkhovna Rada of Ukraine from the political party "European Solidarity", Chairman of the Committee on Integration of Ukraine with the European Union in the Verkhovna Rada of Ukraine.

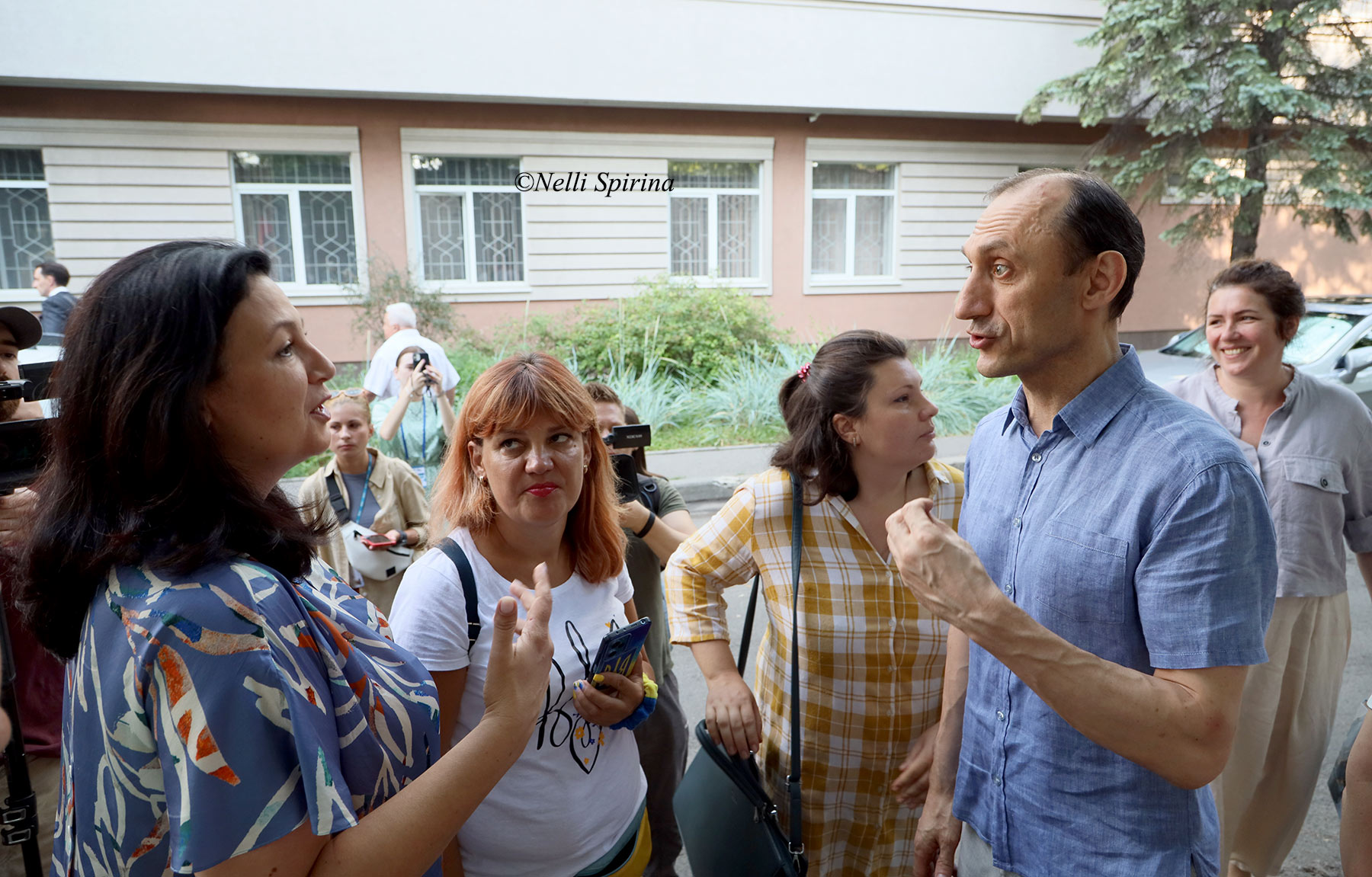
Klympush-Tsintsadze, Colonel Roman Chervinsky and Chervinsky's support group before a hearing at the Shevchenko Court in Kyiv. July 18, 2024

On July 18, 2024, in the Shevchenko Court of Kyiv, she supported the accused Colonel Roman Chervinsky.

=== Personal life ===
Klympush-Tsintsadze is married to Archil Tsintsadze. They have two daughters – Solomiia and Melaniia.

=== Real estate ===
Declaration for 2016.
