= Vasyl Durdynets =

Ukrainian politician and diplomat

- Василь Дурдинець
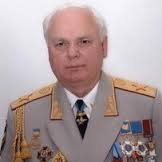
- Durdynets in 1999

Vice Prime Minister of Ukraine on Matters of State Security and Emergencies
- In office 3 July 1995 – 18 June 1996
- Prime Minister: Yevhen Marchuk

7th First Vice Prime Minister of Ukraine
- In office 18 June 1996 – 30 July 1997
- Prime Minister: Pavlo Lazarenko
- Preceded by: Pavlo Lazarenko
- Succeeded by: Anatoliy Holubchenko

Acting Prime Minister of Ukraine (ex officio)
- In office 2 July 1997 – 30 July 1997
- President: Leonid Kuchma
- Preceded by: Pavlo Lazarenko
- Succeeded by: Valeriy Pustovoitenko

Director of the National Bureau of Investigations
- In office July 1997 – March 1999
- President: Leonid Kuchma
- Preceded by: Oleh Lytvak
- Succeeded by: office dissolved

Minister on matters of Emergencies and population security from consequences of the Chernobyl Disaster
- In office 22 March 1999 – 30 November 2002
- Prime Minister: Valeriy Pustovoitenko; Viktor Yushchenko; Anatoliy Kinakh
- Preceded by: Valeriy Kalchenko
- Succeeded by: Hryhoriy Reva

6th Ambassador of Ukraine to Hungary
- In office 2 December 2002 – 15 July 2003
- Preceded by: Orest Klimpush
- Succeeded by: Yuriy Mushka

4th Ambassador of Ukraine to Slovenia
- In office 2 December 2002 – 15 July 2003
- Preceded by: Orest Klimpush
- Succeeded by: Ivan Hnatyshyn

People's Deputy of Ukraine

1st convocation
- In office 15 May 1990 – 10 May 1994
- Constituency: Communist Party of Ukraine, Kirovohrad Oblast, District No.230

2nd convocation
- In office 10 May 1994 – 3 September 1996
- Constituency: Independent, Kirovohrad Oblast, District No.229

Personal details
- Born: 27 September 1937 (age 88) Romočevica, Czechoslovakia (now Romochevytsia, Mukachevo Raion, Zakarpattia Oblast, Ukraine)

Major General Vasyl Vasylovych Durdynets (Ukrainian: Василь Васильович Дурдинець; born 27 September 1937) is a Ukrainian politician and diplomat. He served as Acting Prime Minister of Ukraine during a short period in July 1997.

== Biography and career ==
Vasyl Durdynets was born into peasant family in Czechoslovakia before World War II. In 1960 he graduated in the Law faculty of Ivan Franko Lviv State University. In 1958 through 1970 Durdynets was an active member of the Komsomol of Ukraine (1958–1966) and Komsomol (1966–1970) in Lviv, Moscow, and Kyiv. In 1970, he became a staff member of the Lviv regional committee of the Communist Party of Ukraine.

In 1978 Durdynets was appointed a deputy and in 1982 he became the first deputy Minister of Internal Affairs of Ukraine, holding the post until February 1991. In March 1990 he was elected as a parliamentary to the Verkhovna Rada (first convocation) as member of the Communist Party of the Soviet Union winning the 230th electoral district in Bobrynets, Kirovohrad Oblast. At the first (12th) convocation, Durdynets headed the parliamentary commission on matters of defense and state security and was a non-affiliated member of parliament. Since 29 January 1992 in Verkhovna Rada, Durdynets served as vice-speaker (first deputy head).

To the next convocation Durdynets was reelected as non-affiliated at the 229th electoral district in the same city. At the second convocation Durdynets was a leader of deputy group "Center" and the parliamentary commission on fight with organized crime and corruption. Simultaneously he also served as the first deputy chairman of the Presidential coordination committee in fight with corruption and organized crime.

In July 1995 he rose to the position of Vice-Prime Minister in State Security and Extraordinary Situations and the chairman of Presidential Committee in fight of corruption and organized crime. The following year he became first Vice-Prime Minister (18 June 1996) in the Cabinet of the scandalous Pavlo Lazarenko. After serving a brief term as an acting Prime Minister, he was dismissed and appointed the director of the country's National Investigation Bureau (30 July 1997), while continuing to serve as the chairman of Presidential Committee in fight of corruption and organized crime. In 1996 Durdynets became an initiator in creating of the Ministry of Emergencies and matters of population security from consequences of the Chernobyl Disaster. Since 22 March 1999 he served as a Minister of Extraordinary Situations .

Since 1997 Vasyl Durdynets was promoted to the rank of a general of Internal Affairs Service of Ukraine.

In August 1997 he was admitted to the Council of National Security and Defense of Ukraine (RNBO). On 17 February 2000 he became a member of the government committee in the reformation of the agrarian sector and in the affairs of ecology and extraordinary situations.

In 2002 Durdynets unsuccessfully ran for parliament in the 73rd electoral district in Zakarpattia Oblast as non-affiliated politician.

His state's awards include 5th and 4th Classes of the Order of Prince Yaroslav the Wise, 3rd Class of the Order of Merit, Order of the Red Banner of Labour, Order of the Badge of Honour, Order for Personal Courage, and Personal Firing Weapon.

On 25 April 2011 the President of Ukraine Viktor Yanukovych awarded Durdynets the "Distinguished Juror of Ukraine" as an advisor of the Ministry of Internal Affairs, a participant in the liquidation of consequences of Chernobyl disaster, and a general of Internal Service of Ukraine.

Durdynets is an honorary professor of the National Academy of Internal Affairs.

== See also ==
- Prime Minister of Ukraine

Political offices
| Preceded by Pavlo Lazarenko | Prime Minister of Ukraine (acting); July 1997 | Succeeded by Valeriy Pustovoitenko |
