= List of ambassadors of Ukraine to Hungary =

Ambassador of Ukraine to Hungary
- Incumbent; Fedir Shandor since 2023
- Nominator: Volodymyr Zelenskyy
- Inaugural holder: Dmytro Tkach as Ambassador Extraordinary and Plenipotentiary
- Formation: March 24, 1992
- Website: Ukraine Embassy - Budapest

The Ambassador Extraordinary and Plenipotentiary of Ukraine to Hungary (Ukrainian: Надзвичайний і Повноважний посол України в Угорщині) is the ambassador of Ukraine to Hungary. The current ambassador is Fedir Shandor. He assumed the position in 2023.

The first Ukrainian ambassador to Hungary assumed his post in 1992, the same year a Ukrainian embassy opened in Budapest. Until 2004 the post was responsible for the Ukrainian embassy in Slovenia.

== List of ambassadors ==
=== Ukrainian People's Republic ===
- 1919–1919 – Roman Yarosevych
- 1919–1920 – Mykola Galagan
- 1920–1920 – Lutsiy Kobyliansky (Charge d'Affairs)
- 1920–1921 – Volodymyr Sikevych

=== Ukraine ===
- 1992–1998 – Dmytro Tkach (coincidentally to Slovenia)
- 1998–2002 – Orest Klimpush (coincidentally to Slovenia)
- 2002–2003 – Vasyl Durdynets (coincidentally to Slovenia)
- 2003–2006 – Yuriy Mushka
- 2006–2010 – Dmytro Tkach
- 2010–2014 – Yuriy Mushka
- 2014–2016 – Mykhailo Yunher (Chargés d'affaires ad interim)
- 2016–2022 – Liubov Nepop
- 2024–incumbent – Fedir Shandor
