= Liubov Nepop =

Ukrainian diplomat (born 1971)

- Любов Непоп
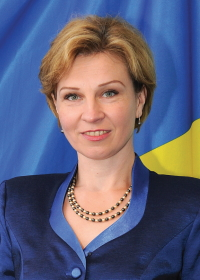
- Nepop in 2020

Ambassador of Ukraine to Hungary
- In office 30 May 2016 – 9 July 2022
- Preceded by: Yuriy Mushka
- Succeeded by: Fedir Shandor

Personal details
- Born: Liubov Vasilivna Nepop; 23 August 1971 (age 55) Kyiv, Ukrainian SSR, Soviet Union
- Education: Taras Shevchenko National University of Kyiv
- Occupation: Diplomat

Liubov Vasilivna Nepop (Ukrainian: Любов Василівна Непоп; born 23 August 1971) is a Ukrainian diplomat who became the ambassador to Hungary from 2016 to 2022.

== Early life and education ==
Nepop was born in Kyiv, Ukraine SSR. She received her degree in linguistics from the Faculty of Linguistics at Taras Shevchenko National University of Kyiv.

== Diplomatic career ==
Nepop entered the Ukrainian diplomatic service and served as an attaché in the Ministry of Foreign Affairs of Ukraine's Department for Europe and America from 1996 to 1997. She held the position of Third Secretary as an attaché at the Embassy in Budapest until 2000. After her return, she advanced to the position of First Secretary in the Department of Policy Analysis and Planning in the State Department.

Following Nepop's tenure as Counselor at the Embassy in Sofia from 2004 to 2007 and her subsequent relocation to Budapest where she continued to serve as an embassy counselor until 2008, she was appointed Deputy Director-General of the State Department for NATO. Prior to being appointed as an Ambassador Extraordinary and Plenipotentiary of Ukraine to Hungary from 30 May 2016 until 9 July 2022, she held the position of Deputy Head of the Mission of Ukraine to the EU while serving as a Minister-Counsellor. She was the President of the Danube Commission in addition to her role as Political Director of the Ukrainian Ministry of Foreign Affairs.

=== Hungary ===
In March 2018, Hungary and Ukraine's diplomatic quarrel worsened after Budapest asked for Kyiv's ambassador to protest what it described as a "death list" that targeted ethnic Hungarians living in Ukraine and military actions near their shared border. In response to inquiries from the media, Levente Magyar stated that Nepop refuted Kyiv's participation in the petition or the list and stated that the troop movements were carried out to safeguard the local populace.

Nepop has been critical of the Hungarian administration ever since the war in Ukraine started, citing among other things the lack of a unified stance with other EU members. She denounced the Hungarian government's stance on the 2022 Russian invasion of Ukraine. She alluded Prime Minister Viktor Orbán, who had previously maintained that "in a war situation we need strategic calm," saying, "You'll only have strategic calm in the grave." She also doubted that Vladimir Putin would halt the invasion of Ukraine if the Russians prevailed, drawing a comparison between the current situation and the 1956 Hungarian Revolution. She threatened Orbán, saying, "You will be next, Putin won't stop!" and criticised him for not joining the fight against Putin. Foreign Minister Péter Szijjártó summoned her "over insulting remarks by Ukrainian authorities directed against the Hungarian leadership."

=== Dismissal ===
Nepop was removed from her position as Ukraine's Ambassador to Hungary by Volodymyr Zelenskyy on 9 July 2022. The Presidential Chancellery in Kyiv published an order that lacked a justification for the ruling. It is known, nevertheless, that the ambassador and the Hungarian government had disagreements. Unjustified recalls of some of her peers in other nations also occurred.

== Honours ==
Throughout her career, she has been awarded the following honours;

- Order of Merit Third Class (22 December 2021)

Diplomatic posts
Preceded by Yuriy Mushka	Ambassador of Ukraine to Hungary; 30 May 2016 – 9 July 2022	Succeeded by Fedir Shandor
