= Orest Klympush =

Ukrainian politician (born 1941)

- Орест Климпуш
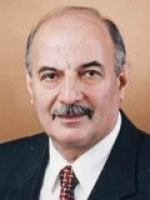

Minister of Transportation
- In office March 1992 – July 1994
- Prime Minister: Vitold Fokin
- Preceded by: post revived
- Succeeded by: Ivan Dankevych

Ambassador of Ukraine to Hungary (concurrently to Slovenia)
- In office 8 December 1997 – 29 April 2002
- President: Leonid Kuchma
- Preceded by: Dmytro Tkach
- Succeeded by: Vasyl Durdynets

People's Deputy of Ukraine

2nd convocation
- In office 11 May 1994 – 12 May 1998
- Constituency: Independent, Zakarpattia Oblast, Rakhiv District No.172

4th convocation
- In office 14 May 2002 – 25 May 2006
- Constituency: Independent, Zakarpattia Oblast, District No.75

Personal details
- Born: 14 February 1941 (age 85) Körösmező, Máramaros County, Hungary

Orest Klympush (Ukrainian: Орест Дмитрович Климпуш; born 14 February 1941) is a Ukrainian engineer, politician, diplomat. He is a son of Dmytro Klympush, the leader of Carpathian Sich formations of the Carpatho-Ukraine.

== Personal life ==
Orest Klympush was born during the World War II on 14 February 1941 in Körösmező, Máramaros County (today, Yasinia, Rakhiv Raion in Ukraine).

From 1957 — worker and auto mechanic at the Yasinsky Forestry Enterprise. He studied part-time at the Khust Forestry Technical School.

1959–1964 — studied at the Kyiv Highway Institute. He graduated from the Kyiv Automobile and Highway Institute in 1964 and received his doctorate there in 1970. He joined the Communist Party in order to defend his dissertation.

From 1965 — Chief Mechanical Engineer at the Khust Motor Transport Depot of Golovlivbud.

From 1971, he worked as an engineer, from 1977 to 1988, he served as deputy director for research at the State Institute of Motor Transport.

In 1987-92 before being appointed the Minister of Transportation, Klympush was a director of the ministerial research institute, the State Automotive Transportation Research and Projection Institute.

In 1988, he became director of the institute and general director of the "Autotransport" Association.

March 20, 1992 – July 11, 1994: Minister of Transportation of Ukraine.

Member of the Verkhovna Rada of Ukraine (2nd convocation) since March 1994 (1st round). Member of the "Constitutional Center" faction. Until December 1997 — chairman of the Subcommittee on Railway, Road, and Air Transport of the Committee on Fuel and Energy, Transport, and Communications.

Advisor to the Prime Minister of Ukraine (in 1995).

December 8, 1997 – April 29, 2002 — Ambassador of Ukraine to Hungary.

Ambassador of Ukraine to Slovenia (March 27, 1998 – April 29, 2002, concurrently).

Member of the Verkhovna Rada of Ukraine (4th convocation) from April 2002 to April 2006. Member of the “United Ukraine” faction (May–June 2002), member of the “People’s Power” group (June 2002–March 2004) and other groups. Member of the Verkhovna Rada of Ukraine’s permanent delegation to the PACE (since June 2002).

Since 2005—Chairman of the All-Ukrainian Association of Transport Employers’ Organizations “Federation of Transport Employers of Ukraine.” Vice President of the All-Ukrainian Public Association “Union of Motor Transport Veterans of Ukraine.”

=== Academic Career ===
Professor in the Department of Engines and Thermal Engineering at the National Transport University; Candidate of Technical Sciences. Teaches the course “Fundamentals of Ecology.”

Academician of the Transport Academy of Ukraine (1992). Professor at the National Transport University.

== See also ==
- Ministry of Infrastructure (Ukraine)
- Ivanna Klympush-Tsintsadze
