= Embassy of Ukraine, Budapest =

Embassy of Ukraine in Hungary

Embassy of Ukraine in Hungary
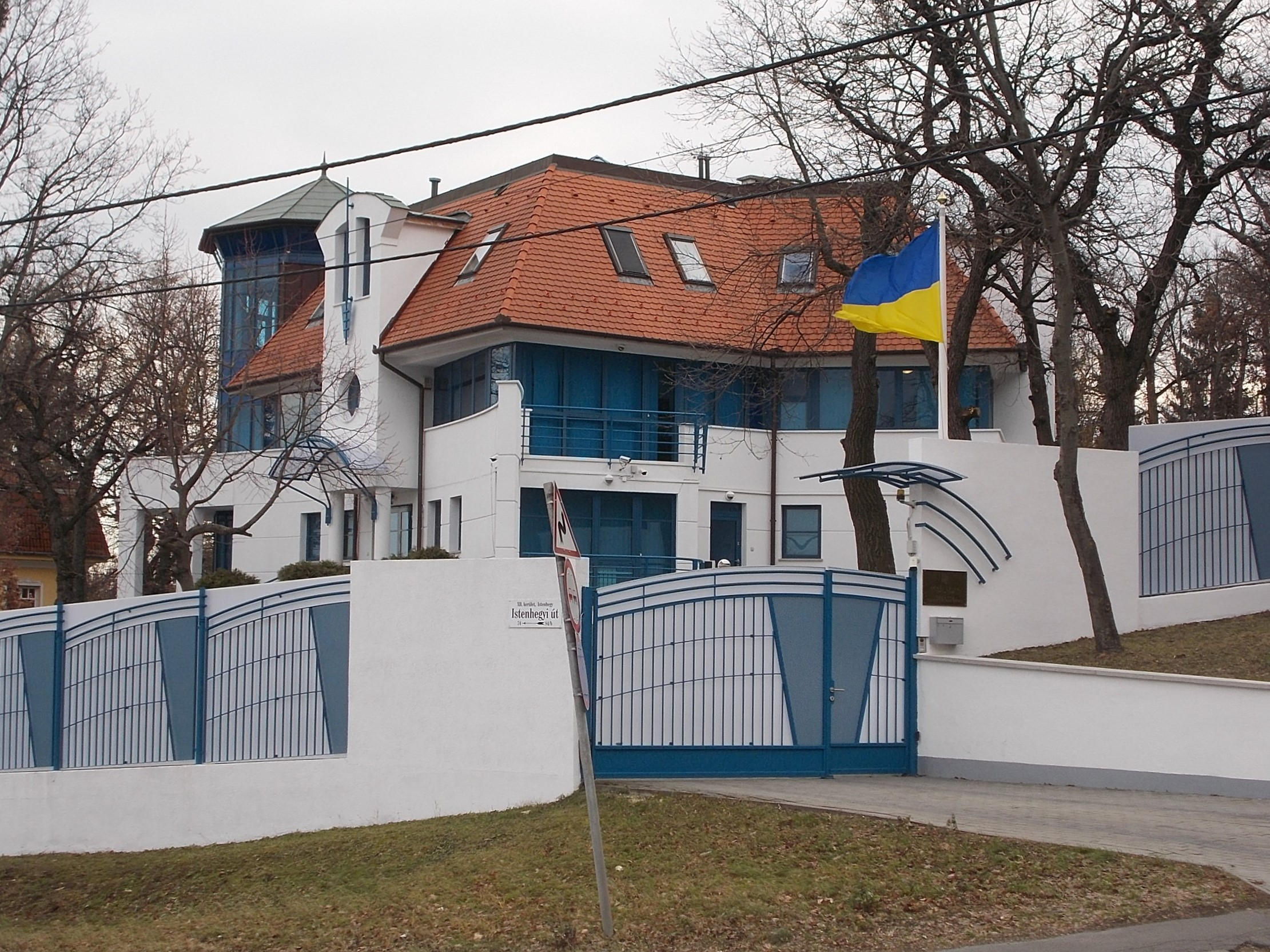
- Embassy of Ukraine in Budapest
- Location: Budapest, Hungary
- Address: 1125, Budapest, 84/B Istenhegyi Str. (ХІІ district)
- Website: Official Website

Embassy of Ukraine in Hungary (Ukrainian: Посольство України в Угорщині) is the diplomatic mission of Ukraine in Budapest, Hungary.

== History of the diplomatic relations ==
Hungary recognized the independence of Ukraine on December 6, 1991, and diplomatic relations between two countries were established same day by signing an agreement in Kyiv on the basics of good neighborliness and cooperation. The Embassy of Hungary was opened in Kyiv on December 6, 1991. On March 23, 1992, Embassy of Ukraine in Hungary began its functioning.

== See also ==
- List of ambassadors of Ukraine to Hungary
- Hungary–Ukraine relations
- List of diplomatic missions in Hungary
- Foreign relations of Hungary
- Foreign relations of Ukraine
