= Second Masol government =

Government of Ukraine

Second Masol Government
- 3rd Cabinet of Ukraine (since 1991)

- Date formed: 16 June 1994
- Date dissolved: 4 April 1995

People and organisations
- Head of state: Leonid Kravchuk / Leonid Kuchma (since July 19, 1994)
- Head of government: Vitaliy Masol
- Status in legislature: Majority

History
- Incoming formation: Kuchma government
- Outgoing formation: Marchuk government
- Outgoing election: 4 June 1990 / 27 March 1994
- Predecessor: Leonid Kuchma
- Successor: Yevhen Marchuk

The Second Masol government was created after the Ukrainian parliament had ousted the previous Cabinet of Leonid Kuchma on September 21, 1993. After Kuchma's dismissal the President of Ukraine Leonid Kravchuk took over the control of cabinet for almost a year.

On June 16, 1994, only 199 deputies voted for the appointment of Vitaliy Masol who headed the cabinet before and was ousted as result of intense student's protests known as the "Revolution on Granite". Masol's new government was Ukraine's third since Ukraine gained its independence in August 1991. Note that not all members of the Cabinet were ministers.

On April 4, 1995, the Cabinet was dismissed due to the vote of no confidence resolution adopted by the Supreme Council of Ukraine.

== Existing members ==
Office	Name minister	Party
First Vice Prime Minister	Yukhym Zvyahilsky	
Vice Prime Minister (on issues of Agro-Industrial Complex)	Volodymyr Demianov	
Vice Prime Minister (on issues of Industry and Construction)	Vasyl Yevtukhov	
Vice Prime Minister (on issues of Humanitarian Policy)	Mykola Zhulynskyi	
Vice Prime Minister (on issues of military–industrial complex)	Valeriy Shmarov	
Vice Prime Minister (on issues of Foreign Economical Activity and Investments)	Valentyn Landyk	
Chairman of State Property Fund	Volodymyr Pryadko	
Chairman of Anti-Monopoly Committee	Oleksandr Zavada	
Governor of National Bank of Ukraine	Viktor Yushchenko	
Chairman of Security Service of Ukraine	Yevhen Marchuk	
Chairman of State Committee of Border Guard	Valeriy Hubenko	
Chairman of State Customs Committee	Anatoliy Kolos	
Minister of Economy	Roman Shpek	
Minister of Forest Business	Valeriy Samoplavsky	
Minister of Machine-Building, Military-Industrial Complex and Conversion	Dmytro Chernenko	
Minister of Rural Business and Provision	Yuriy Karasyk	
Minister of Energy and Electrification	Vilen Semenyuk	
Minister of Communication	Oleh Przhevalsky	
Minister of Culture	Ivan Dzyuba	
Minister on issues of Nationalities and Migration	Oleksandr Yemets	
Minister of Education	Petro Talanchuk	
Minister of Healthcare	Yuriy Spizhenko	
Minister of Natural Environment	Yuriy Kostenko	
Minister of Labor	Mykhailo Kaskevych	
Minister of Industry	Anatoliy Holubchenko	
Minister of Social Security of Population	Arkadiy Yershov	
Minister of Statistics	Mykola Borysenko	
Minister of Population Protection from consequences of Chornobyl Catastrophe	Heorhiy Hotovchyts	
Minister of Youth and Sports	Valeriy Borzov	
Minister of Cabinet of Ministers	Ivan Dotsenko	
Minister of Construction and Architecture	Yuriy Serbin	
Minister of Foreign Economic Relations	Oleh Slepichev	
Minister of Defense	Vitaliy Radetsky	
Minister of Finance	Hryhoriy Pyatachenko	
Minister of Justice	Vasyl Onopenko	
Minister of Internal Affairs	Andriy Vasylyshyn	
Minister of Transport	Orest Klimpush	
Minister of Foreign Affairs	Anatoliy Zlenko	

== Composition ==
Office	Name minister	Party
Prime Minister	Vitaliy Masol	
First Vice Prime Minister	Valeriy Samoplavsky; Yevhen Marchuk	
First Vice Prime Minister (on issues of Economic Reform)	Viktor Pynzenyk	
First Vice Prime Minister - (on issues of Agro-Industrial Complex)	Petro Sabluk	
Vice Prime Minister	Yevhen Marchuk	
Vice Prime Minister	Anatoliy Dyuba	
Vice Prime Minister	Volodymyr Plityn	
Vice Prime Minister (on issues of Humanitarian Policy)	Ivan Kuras	
Vice Prime Minister - Minister of Foreign Economical Relations	Serhiy Osyka	
Vice Prime Minister - (on issues of Financing and Banking)	Ihor Mityukov	
Vice Prime Minister - (on issues of Agro-Industrial Complex)	Petro Sabluk	
Chairman of Security Service of Ukraine	Valeriy Malikov	
Chairman of State Customs Committee	Yuriy Kravchenko	
Chairman of State Committee of Border Guard	Viktor Bannykh	
Minister of Healthcare	Volodymyr Maltsev; Volodymyr Bobrov	
Minister on issues of Nationalities and Migration	Mykola Shulha	
Minister of Machine-Building, Military-Industrial Complex and Conversion	Viktor Petrov	
Minister of Finance	Petro Hermanchuk	
Minister of Cabinet of Ministers	Valeriy Pustovoitenko	
Minister of Internal Affairs	Volodymyr Radchenko	
Minister of Foreign Affairs	Hennadiy Udovenko	
Minister of Coal Industry	Viktor Poltavets	
Minister of Press and Information	Mykhailo Onufriychuk	
Minister of Education	Mykhailo Zghurovskyi	
Minister of Fishing Business	Mykola Shvedenko	
Minister of Natural Environment and Nuclear Safety	Yuriy Kostenko	
