= Fokin government =

Government of Ukraine

Fokin Government
- 1st Cabinet of Ukraine (since 1990)

- Date formed: 18 April 1991
- Date dissolved: 25 February 1992

People and organisations
- Head of state: Head of the Verkhovna Rada presidium / Leonid Kravchuk (since 5 December 1991)
- Head of government: Vitold Fokin
- Member party: Communist
- Status in legislature: Majority

History
- Incoming formation: First Masol government
- Outgoing formation: Kuchma government
- Outgoing election: June 4, 1990
- Predecessor: Vitaliy Masol
- Successor: Leonid Kuchma

The Fokin Government was the second Cabinet of Ministers appointed in independent Ukraine (1990-1991) that was approved following the ousting of the Masol's government due to the 1990 Kyiv's student strike (also known as Revolution on Granite).

On 18 April 1991 the head of the Council of Minister of the Ukrainian SSR was officially renamed as the Prime Minister of the Ukrainian SSR. On 21 May 1991 the former council of ministers was officially renamed as cabinet of ministers of the Ukrainian SSR. On 17 September 1991 Ukrainian SSR was officially renamed into Ukraine.

== Brief scope ==
On June 13, 1990 Verkhovna Rada of Ukrainian SSR acknowledged through its declaration the petition of the Council of Ministers of Ukrainian SSR about its resignation because of reelections to Verkhovna Rada. The council, however was authorized to continue to perform its duties until the new government would be formed. The new chairman of the government was appointed on June 28. Initially the government was headed by Vitaliy Masol, however he was forced to resign due to heavy student's manifestations in Kyiv. In November 1990 the new chairman was appointed Vitold Fokin who replaced the acting chairman Kostyantyn Masik.

On July 16, 1990 the Verkhovna Rada adopted the Declaration of State Sovereignty of Ukraine, after which on July 18 were appointed three chairman's deputies. However, it was not until July 25 when the first members of new council were appointed. The process of confirming the ministerial positions stretched until August 3, 1990.

On April 18, 1991 the Council of Ministers was replaced with the Cabinet of Ministers. Offices of chairman and his deputies became offices of Prime Minister and his vice-ministers. There also was introduced a new special position of state minister, which however was liquidated on February 25, 1992. On February 25 the whole cabinet was reconstructed and reshuffled.

== 1990–1991 composition (last Council of Ministers) ==
Initial composition

Office	Name minister	Appt. Date
Chairman	Vitaliy Masol	June 28
First Deputy Chairman	Oleksandr Tkachenko	July 18
Deputy Chairman	Volodymyr Borysovsky	July 18
Deputy Chairman	Vitold Fokin	July 18

After July 25

Office	Name minister	Appt. Date
Chairman	Vitaliy Masol	June 28
First Deputy Chairman	Anatoliy Statinov	July 25
Deputy Chairman	Volodymyr Borysovsky	July 18
Deputy Chairman	Vitold Fokin	July 18
Deputy Chairman	Kostyantyn Masik	July 25
Deputy Chairman	Viktor Urchukin	July 25
Deputy Chairman	Viktor Hladush	July 25
Director in Affairs of the Council of Ministers	Volodymyr Pekhota	July 25
Minister of Trade	Oleh Slepichev	July 25
Minister of Health Safety	Yuri Spizhenko	July 25
Minister of Energy and Electrification	Vitaliy Sklyarov	July 26
Minister of Internal Affairs	Andriy Vasylyshyn	July 26
Minister of Construction Material Industry	Anatoliy Zolotaryov	July 26
Minister of Social Security	Oleksandra Luk'yanenko	July 26
Minister of Foreign Affairs	Anatoliy Zlenko	July 27
Ministry of Forestry	Valeriy Samoplavsky	July 27
Minister of Bread Products	Mykola Kompanets	July 27
Minister of Water and Water Resources	Viktor Khoryov	July 27
Ministry of Transportation	Pavlo Volkov	July 27
Minister of Light Industry	Hryhoriy Nykytenko	July 30
Minister of Mounting and Special Construction	Oleksandr Shtundel	July 30
Minister of Finance	Oleksandr Kovalenko	August 2
Minister of Communications	Volodymyr Delikatny	August 2
Minister of Justice	Vitaliy Boiko	August 2
Minister of Construction	Volodymyr Plitin	August 2
Minister of Labor	Vitaliy Vasylchenko	August 3
Minister of National Education	Ivan Zyazyun	August 3
Minister of Higher and Middle Special Education	Volodymyr Parkhomenko	August 3

State Committees

Office	Name minister	Appt. Date
Chairman of State Committee in Economy (former Derzhplan)	Vitold Fokin	July 18
Chairman of State Committee in Material-Technical Support	Anatoliy Minchenko	July 26
Chairman of Committee of State Security (KGB)	Nikolai Galushko	July 26
Chairman of State Committee in Statistics	Mykola Borysenko	July 26
Chairman of State Committee in Television and Radio-broadcasting	Mykola Okhmakevych	July 26
Chairman of State Committee in Press-media	Yuri Dyachenko	July 30
Chairman of State Committee in Coal Industry	Mykola Surhai	July 30
Chairman of State Committee in Affairs of Youth, Fitness, and Sport	Valeriy Borzov	July 30
Chairman of State Agro-Industrial Committee	Mykola Sydorenko	July 30
Chairman of State Committee in Protection of Population from Consequences of Chernobyl Catastrophe	Heorhiy Hotovchyts	August 3
Chairman of State Committee in Construction and Architecture	Volodymyr Husakov	August 3

=== Changes ===
- On August 3, 1990 Kostyantyn Masik became the First Deputy Chairman
- On October 23, 1990 Vitaliy Masol was dismissed, while Masik was performing his duties as the First Deputy
- On November 14, 1990 Vitold Fokin was appointed the new Chairman

== 1991–1992 composition (first Cabinet of Ministers) ==
Office	Name minister	Appt. Date
Prime Minister of Ukraine	Vitold Fokin	April 18
First deputy prime-minister	Kostyantyn Masik	May 21
Deputy prime-minister	Oleksandr Maselsky	May 21
State Minister - Minister for the Economy	Anatoliy Minchenko	May 21
State Minister of Defense Complex and Conversion	Viktor Antonov	May 21
State Minister of Agrarian Policy and Provision - Minister of Farm Management	Oleksandr Tkachenko	May 21
State Secretary of Cabinet of Ministers	Volodymyr Pekhota	May 21
State Minister of Investment Policy and Construction Complex	Volodymyr Borysovsky	June 5
State Minister of Industry and Transportation	Viktor Hladush	June 5
State Minister of Private Property and Pririotership	Volodymyr Lanovyi	June 5
State Minister of Defense, National Security, and Emergencies	Yevhen Marchuk	June 5
Minister of Internal Affairs	Andriy Vasylyshyn	June 5
Minister of Justice	Vitaliy Boiko	June 5
Minister of Finance	Oleksandr Kovalenko	June 5
Minister of Trade	Oleh Slepichev	June 5
Minister of Health Security	Yuri Spizhenko	June 5
Minister of Foreign Affairs	Anatoliy Zlenko	June 6
Minister of Forestry	Valeriy Samoplavsky	June 6
Minister of Energy and Electrification	Vitaliy Sklyarov	June 6
Minister of Statistics	Mykola Borysenko	June 6
Minister of National Education	Ivan Zyazyun	June 6
Minister of Culture	Larysa Khorolets	June 6
Minister of Protection Population from Consequences of Chernobyl	Heorhiy Hotovchyts	June 6
Minister of Natural Environment Protection	Yuri Shcherbak	June 19
Minister in Affairs of State Property Privatization and De-monopolization of Industry	Viktor Salnikov	June 19
Minister of International Business Relationships	Valeriy Kravchenko	June 19
Minister of Defense	Kostyantyn Morozov	September 3
Minister of Social Security	Arkadiy Yershov	September 17
Minister of Labor	Mykhailo Kaskevych	October 29
February 1992 reshuffle
Minister of Maichine-Building, Military-Industrial Complex, and Conversion	Viktor Anotnov	February 25
Minister of Investments and Construction	Volodymyr Borysovsky	February 25
Minister of State Resources	Anatoliy Minchenko	February 29
Minister of Industry	Viktor Hladush	February 29
Minister of Economy	Volodymyr Lanovyi	March 5
Minister of Farm Management and Provision	Vasyl Tkachuk	February 29
Minister of Transportation	Orest Klimpush	March 20
Minister of Communications	Oleh Przhevalsky	April 1

State Committees

Office	Name minister	Appt. Date
Chairman of State Security Committee (KGB)	Nikolai Golushko	May 13
Chairman of Service of National Security of Ukraine	Yevhen Marchuk	November 6
Chairman of State Customs Committee	Oleksiy Koval	December 11
Chairman of Committee in Protection of State Border	Valeriy Hubenko	December 25
Chairman of Directory of State Property Fund	Volodymyr Pryadko	July 9

=== Changes ===
1991

- On September 20 KGB was liquidated, in its place was formed the Service of National Security.
- On October 23 the new Minister of Finance was appointed Hryhoriy P'yatachenko replacing Oleksandr Kovalenko.
- On October 29 Maselsky was dismissed. New vice prime minister was appointed on February 25, 1992 (Viktor Sytnyk).
- On December 12 the Ministry of National Education was replaced with the Ministry of Education headed by Petro Talanchuk.
- On December 31 Volodymyr Tymofeyev replaced the Minister of Trade Oleh Slepichev.

1992

- On February 25 all State Ministries were liquidated.
- On February 25 the State Ministry of Defense Complex and Conversion replaced with the Ministry of Machine-Building, Military-Industrial Complex, and Conversion.
- On February 25 the State Ministry of Investment Policy and Construction Complex replaced with the Ministry of Investments and Construction.
- On February 26 the State Secretary of Cabinet of Ministers became the Minister of Cabinet of Ministers.
- On February 29 the State Ministry of Agrarian Policy and Provision replaced with the Ministry of Farm Management and Provision.
- On February 29 the State Ministry of Industry and Transportation split between the Ministry of Industry and the Ministry of Transportation (recreated later).
- On March 5 the State Ministry of Economy replaced with the Ministry of Economy.
- On March 6 Volodymyr Lanovyi was appointed a vice-prime-minister, while holding the post of the Minister of Economy.
- On March 20 Volodymyr Kampo replaced the Minister of Justice Vitaliy Boiko.
- On March 20 Anatoliy Voronkov replaced the Minister of International Business Relationships Valeriy Kravchenko.
- On March 20 Roman Shpek replaced the Minister in Affairs of State Property Privatization and De-monopolization of Industry Viktor Salnikov.
- On July 11 Lanovyi (Minister of Economy) was dismissed.
- On July 11 Valentyn Symonenko was appointed the First vice-prime-minister.
- On September 28 Mykhailo Pavlovsky replaced the Minister of Industry Viktor Hladush.
- On October 1 Fokin was dismissed as the Verkhovna Rada expressed its doubt in government.
- On October 2 Valentyn Symonenko was appointed an acting prime-minister.
- On October 16 the Minister of Cabinet of Ministers was dismissed.
- On October 27 was approved the new Cabinet of Ministers headed by Leonid Kuchma.
- On November 7 Valentyn Symonenko was dismissed.
- On November 13 the Ministry of State Resources was liquidated.
- On November 13 the Ministry of International Business Relationships was liquidated.
- On November 13 the Ministry in Affairs of State Property Privatization and De-monopolization of Industry was liquidated.
- On December 8 the Minister of Farm Management and Provision was dismissed.
- On December 30 the Minister of Investments and Construction was dismissed.
