= Marchuk government =

Government of Ukraine

Marchuk Government
- 4th Cabinet of Ukraine (since 1991)

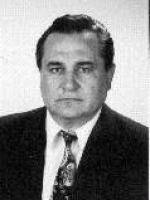
- Date formed: 8 June 1995
- Date dissolved: 27 May 1996

People and organisations
- Head of state: Leonid Kuchma
- Head of government: Yevhen Marchuk
- Deputy head of government: Pavlo Lazarenko; Petro Sabluk; Mykhailo Zubets; Ivan Kuras; Roman Shpek; Viktor Pynzenyk; Vasyl Yevtukhov; Oleksandr Yemets; Anatoliy Kinakh
- Status in legislature: Majority

History
- Outgoing election: 27 March 1994
- Incoming formation: Second Masol government
- Outgoing formation: First Lazarenko government
- Predecessor: Vitaliy Masol
- Successor: Pavlo Lazarenko

The Marchuk government was formed on 8 June 1995 under the leadership of Yevhen Marchuk. It was the first of two governments (along with the First Lazarenko government) to be appointed directly by President Leonid Kuchma. It was the fourth cabinet formed since Ukraine's independence from the Soviet Union, after the Fokin government, Kuchma government, and Second Masol government.

== History ==
=== Formation ===
The Marchuk government was appointed directly by President Leonid Kuchma on 3 March 1995 in an acting capacity, and was subsequently appointed in a full capacity as Prime Minister on 8 June 1995 after the collapse of the Second Masol government. Having previously been appointed as First Deputy Prime Minister of Ukraine, Marchuk was the first of two prime ministers to be appointed directly by the President, along with Pavlo Lazarenko. Marchuk's government also had decreased powers after the 1995 Ukrainian constitutional agreement.

=== Fall ===
Soon after the government's establishment, tensions between Marchuk and Kuchma began to increase as Marchuk prepared for a presidential campaign of his own against Kuchma in 1999. Kuchma cited in his dismissal of Marchuk the worsening state of Ukraine's economy, Marchuk's focus on bolstering his political image, the fact that deputies are forbidden from holding political office, but this was regarded by Marchuk's allies as an effort to push him out of power.

== Composition ==
President Leonid Kuchma appointed each member of the Marchuk government by presidential decree, bypassing the process of nominating them through the Verkhovna Rada.

On 1 December 1995, Serhii Poliakov became Minister of the Coal Industry. Mykhailo Zubets also became Deputy Prime Minister for the agro-industrial complex on 29 March 1996.

Logo	Office	Incumbent
	Prime Minister	Yevhen Marchuk
	First Deputy Prime Minister	Pavlo Lazarenko
	Deputy Prime Minister (Agro-industrial complex)	Petro Sabluk (until 29 March 1996); Mykhailo Zubets (from 29 March 1996)
	Deputy Prime Minister (Humanitarian policy)	Ivan Kuras
	Deputy Prime Minister (Economic policy)	Roman Shpek
	Deputy Prime Minister (Economic reforms)	Viktor Pynzenyk
	Deputy Prime Minister (Fuel-energy complex)	Vasyl Yevtukhov
	Deputy Prime Minister (Political and legal issues)	Oleksandr Yemets
	Deputy Prime Minister (Industrial policy)	Anatoliy Kinakh
	Minister of Internal Affairs	Yuriy Kravchenko
	Minister of Foreign Affairs	Hennadiy Udovenko
	Minister of Foreign Economic Relations and Trade	Serhii Osyka
	Minister of Finance	Petro Hermanchuk
	Minister of Defence	Valeriy Shmarov
	Minister of Social Policy	Arkadii Yershov
	Minister of Justice	Serhiy Holovatyi
	Minister of Healthcare	Yevhen Korolenko
	Minister of Education	Mykhailo Zghurovskyi
	Minister of Energy and Electrification	Oleksii Sheberstov
	Minister of the Coal Industry	Viktor Poltavets (until 1 December 1995); Serhii Poliakov (from 1 December 1995)
	Minister of Forestry	Valerii Samoplavskyi
	Minister of Fisheries	Mykola Shvedenko
	Minister of Industry	Valerii Mazur
	Minister of Economy	Vasyl Hureiev
	Minister of Transport	Ivan Dankevych
	Minister of Press and Information Affairs	Mykhailo Onufriichuk
	Minister of Communications	Valerii Yefremov
	Minister of Agriculture and Food	Pavlo Haidutskyi
	Minister of Environmental Protection and Nuclear Safety	Yuriy Kostenko
	Minister of Culture and the Arts	Dmytro Ostapenko
	Minister of Youth and Sports	Valeriy Borzov
	Minister of Emergency Situations	Volodymyr Kholosha
	Minister of Statistics	Mykola Borysenko
	Minister of Labour	Mykhailo Kaskevych
	Minister of Nationality and Migration	Volodymyr Yevtukh
	Minister of Mechanical Engineering, the Military-Industrial Complex, and Conversion	Valerii Maliev
	Minister of the Cabinet of Ministers	Valeriy Pustovoitenko
