= Kuchma government =

Government in Ukraine from 1992–1994

Kuchma Government
- 2nd Cabinet of Ukraine (since 1991)

- Date formed: 27 October 1992
- Date dissolved: 21 September 1993

People and organisations
- Head of state: Leonid Kravchuk
- Head of government: Leonid Kuchma
- Status in legislature: Majority

History
- Incoming formation: Fokin government
- Outgoing formation: Second Masol government
- Outgoing election: 4 June 1990
- Predecessor: Vitold Fokin
- Successor: Vitaliy Masol

The Kuchma Government was created after the Ukrainian parliament had ousted the previous government of Vitold Fokin on 1 October 1992; it contained some of the ministers of its predecessor.

On 13 December 1992, 316 deputies voted for the appointment of Leonid Kuchma, general director of the PA Pivdenmash, as Prime Minister of Ukraine. His new government was Ukraine's second since Ukraine gained its independence in August 1991. Note that not all members of the Cabinet were ministers.

On 21 September 1993, the Cabinet was dismissed due to the vote of no confidence resolution adopted by the Verkhovna Rada.

== Fokin's ministers (officials) ==
Office	Name minister	Party
Chairman of State Property Fund	Volodymyr Pryadko	
Chairman of Security Service of Ukraine	Yevhen Marchuk	
Chairman of State Customs Committee	Oleksiy Koval	
Governor of National Bank of Ukraine	Vadym Hetman	
Chairman of Anti-Monopoly Committee	Oleksandr Zavada	

== Composition ==
Office	Name minister	Party
Prime Minister	Leonid Kuchma	
First Vice Prime Minister	Ihor Yukhnovsky; Yukhym Zvyahilsky	
Vice Prime Minister (on issues of Industry and Construction)	Vasyl Yevtukhov	
Vice Prime Minister (on issues of Agro-Industrial Complex)	Volodymyr Demianov	
Vice Prime Minister - Minister of Economy	Viktor Pynzenyk	
Vice Prime Minister (on issues of Fuel-Energy Complex)	Yuliy Ioffe	
Vice Prime Minister (on issues of Humanitarian Policy)	Mykola Zhulynskyi	
Vice Prime Minister (on issues of military–industrial complex)	Valeriy Shmarov	
Vice Prime Minister (on issues of Foreign Economical Activity and Investments)	Valentyn Landyk	
Chairman of State Committee of Border Guard	Valeriy Hubenko	
Governor of National Bank of Ukraine	Viktor Yushchenko	
Chairman of State Customs Committee	Anatoliy Kolos	
Minister of Cabinet of Ministers	Anatoliy Lobov; Valeriy Pustovoitenko	
Minister of Energy and Electrification	Vitaliy Sklyarov; Anatoliy Hrytsenko; Vilen Semenyuk	
Minister of Communication	Oleh Przhevalsky	
Minister of Foreign Economic Relations	Ivan Herts	
Minister of Forest Business	Valeriy Samoplavsky	
Minister of Machine-Building, Military-Industrial Complex and Conversion	Viktor Antonov; Dmytro Chernenko	
Minister of Education	Petro Talanchuk	
Minister of Healthcare	Yuriy Spizhenko	
Minister of Natural Environment	Yuriy Kostenko	
Minister of Labor	Mykhailo Kaskevych	
Minister of Industry	Anatoliy Holubchenko	
Minister of Social Security	Arkadiy Yershov	
Minister of Statistics	Mykola Borysenko	
Minister of Transport	Orest Klimpush	
Minister of Population Protection from consequences of Chornobyl Catastrophe	Heorhiy Hotovchyts	
Minister of Youth and Sports	Valeriy Borzov	
Minister of Internal Affairs	Andriy Vasylyshyn	
Minister of Foreign Affairs	Anatoliy Zlenko	
Minister of Defense	Kostyantyn Morozov	
Minister of Finance	Hryhoriy Pyatachenko	
Minister of Justice	Vasyl Onopenko	
Minister of Culture	Ivan Dzyuba	
Minister of Rural Business and Provision	Yuriy Karasyk	
Minister of Construction and Architecture	Yuriy Serbin	
Minister of Economy	Yuriy Bannykov; Roman Shpek	
Minister on issues of Nationalities and Migration	Oleksandr Yemets	
