= Vasyl Tkachuk (politician) =

Ukrainian politician and businessman (1933–2015)

- Василь Ткачук
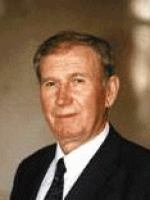
- An official portrait of him from 1998.

Minister of Agriculture and Food
- President: Leonid Kravchuk
- Prime Minister: Vitold Fokin
- In office 29 February 1992 – 8 December 1992
- Preceded by: Oleksandr Tkachenko
- Succeeded by: Yuriy Karasyk

People's Deputy of Ukraine
- In office 29 March 1998 – 31 March 2002
- Constituency: Ivano-Frankivsk Oblast, No. 86

Deputy of the Supreme Soviet of the USSR
- In office 1985–1991
- Constituency: Ivano-Frankivsk Oblast, No. 47

Personal details
- Born: Vasyl Mykhailovych Tkachuk; 10 December 1933 Korolówka, Second Polish Republic (now Korolevka, Ukraine)
- Died: 8 May 2015 (aged 81) Pidhaichyky, Ukraine
- Party: Communist Party of the Soviet Union (1985-1989); NDP (1998-1999); Party of Regional Revival of Ukraine (1999-2000); Party of Regions (2000-2002)
- Education: Ivano-Frankivsk National Technical University of Oil and Gas (1970); Lviv Polytechnic

Vasyl Mykhailovych Tkachuk (Ukrainian: Василь Михайлович Ткачук; 10 December 1933 – 8 May 2015) was a Ukrainian politician and businessman who served as a People's Deputy of Ukraine in the Verkhovna Rada during its second convocation from 1998 to 2002. Prior to this, he briefly served as Minister of Agriculture and Food in the Fokin government from February to December 1992 and as a Deputy of the Supreme Soviet of the USSR from 1985 to 1991.

== Early life ==
Tkachuk was born on 10 December 1933 in the small village of Korolówka, then part of the Second Polish Republic. He was born into an ethnically Ukrainian family, with his father being named Mykhailo Yuriyovych Tkachuk and his mother named Maria Stepanova. When Tkachuk was young, the village of Korolówka was annexed into the Ivano-Frankivsk Oblast of the Ukrainian SSR, and renamed Korolevka.

After this, he attended secondary school, and in 1950, he immediately entered the workforce, becoming an apprentice mechanic and later a gas welder at the Kolomyia Station depot of the regional Lviv Railways. He left the company in 1952 to do his mandatory service in the Soviet Army, and served on the Baltic Fleet for four years before returning to Ukraine to become a mechanic at the Pidhaichyky distillery. He worked there for another twelve years, until 1968, working his way up to director until he left the enterprise when he was appointed chairman of the collective farm "Banner of Communism", also located within the village of Pidhaichyky. Tkachuk would spend eleven more years serving as the collective farm's chairman until 1987. Simultaneously, in 1970, he graduated from the Ivano-Frankivsk National Technical University of Oil and Gas with a specialisation as an engineer. He would also graduate from the Lviv Polytechnic Institute with a specialisation as an economist sometime later.

== Business career ==
In 1987, Tkachuk founded the agricultural company "Prut", one of the few private enterprises to be allowed at the time. In 1992, after Ukrainian independence, Prut was privatised and he became its chairman of the board. On 6 February 1988, he supported the opening of the first commercial newspaper of the USSR, Agro, which was published in Kolomyia.

== Political career ==
Starting in 1985, Tkachuk became a Deputy of the Supreme Soviet of the USSR. Upon becoming a deputy, he appointed Mykhailo Negrych as his deputy and assistant to the Supreme Soviet. In the Soviet, he was mainly focused on agricultural issues and the infrastructure surrounding them, alongside seeking funding for his district and Ivano-Frankivsk Oblast. One of Tkachuk's main things he did in the Soviet was to acquire funding for the Pysanka Museum in Kolomyia, a pysanka museum opened in 1987. In 1989, after the reorganisation of the Supreme Soviet, he became a People's Deputy of the USSR after he left the Communist Party and became an independent representing the electoral district No. 47 (Ivano-Frankivsk Oblast), a position he kept until 1991, when the Soviet Union dissolved and Ukraine became independent. After Ukrainian independence, he briefly left politics, until February 1992 when the Fokin government was reshuffled. Under this reshuffle, Oleksandr Tkachenko was dismissed from the Fokin government as Minister of Agriculture and Food, and on 29 February, Tkachuk was chosen to replace him. Ultimately, though, Tkachuk did not stay in the role long and was dismissed in December after the Kuchma government took power.

Tkachuk returned to politics in 1998 when he ran in the 1998 Ukrainian parliamentary elections for constituency No. 86 (Ivano-Frankivsk Oblast) in the third convocation of the Verkhovna Rada. He was selected during the elections as an independent, but upon joining the parliament, he became a member of the newly created Party of Regions. He also sat on the Committee on Environmental Policy and Natural Resource Management during his time there. His mandate ended in 2002, and he did not run for re-election. After this, he would mainly stay away from politics, but in an interview in 2014, he expressed his beliefs that local farm managers should not be bought out by large holdings in Kyiv, although he said this was mainly caused by the lack of state support programs and widespread land corruption schemes, which forced property owners to sell. Tkachuk also expressed his beliefs that there should be more focus on protecting rural farming communities, or he said small Ukrainian villages would eventually collapse without it.

== Personal life ==
He was married to Anastasia Tikhonovna, a pensioner. They had four children: Lyubomyr (born 1957), an employee at Prut; Mykhailo (1959–1992); Svetlana (born 1964), an entrepreneur; and Ulyana (born 1983), a magistrate of the Diplomatic Academy of the Ministry of Foreign Affairs of Ukraine.

Tkachuk was a long-time resident of Pidhaichyky, which he had worked since 1956. On 8 May 2015, he died in the village of a heart attack. A farewell was set to take place at the courtyard of his home, with the funeral to be held in his hometown of Korolevka on 10 May 2015.

== Honours and awards ==
Tkachuk was awarded with the following honours:

- Order of the Red Banner of Labour (1972)
- Order of Lenin (1976)
- Honoured Worker of Agriculture of the Ukrainian SSR (1978)
- Hero of Socialist Labour (1982)
- Order of Lenin, second award (1982)
- Order of Saint Prince Volodymyr the Great, Equal-to-the-Apostles, 3rd Class (UOC, 1999)
- Order of Prince Yaroslav the Wise, 5th class (2000)
- Hero of Ukraine (Order of State as a civilian, 19 January 2002)
- Honorary Member of the Ukrainian Academy of Agricultural Sciences (2003)
- Jubilee Medal "20 Years of Independence of Ukraine" (2011)
