= Valentyn Symonenko =

Ukrainian politician (born 1940)

Hero of Ukraine Valentyn Symonenko
- Валентин Симоненко
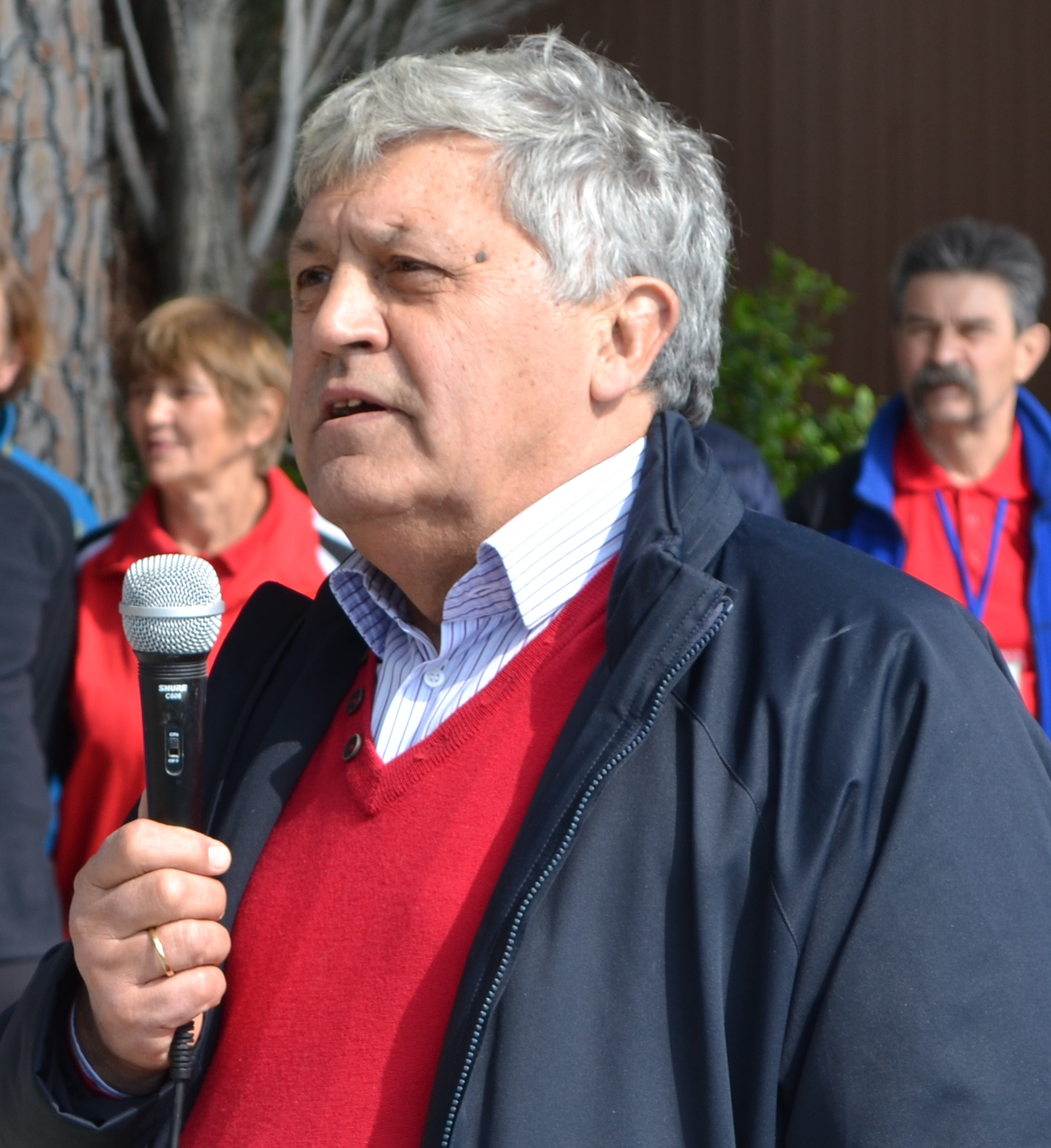
- Symonenko in 2013

2nd First Deputy Prime Minister of Ukraine
- In office 11 July 1992 – 7 November 1992
- Prime Minister: Vitold Fokin
- Preceded by: Kostyantyn Masyk
- Succeeded by: Ihor Yukhnovsky

Acting Prime Minister of Ukraine
- In office 2 October 1992 – 13 October 1992
- President: Leonid Kravchuk
- Preceded by: Vitold Fokin
- Succeeded by: Leonid Kuchma

Presidential Representative in Odesa Oblast
- In office March 1992 – July 1992
- President: Leonid Kravchuk

People's Deputy of Ukraine
- In office May 1994 – May 1998
- In office May 1990 – June 1992

Personal details
- Born: 4 July 1940 (age 86) Odesa, Ukrainian SSR, Soviet Union
- Spouse: Yelena Taratuta
- Children: Serhiy (1963), Kostyantyn (1974), Yelena Vitalivna Lozhkareva
- Education: Odesa State Academy of Civil Engineering and Architecture
- Awards: Hero of Ukraine; Order of Friendship

Valentyn Kostyantynovych Symonenko (Ukrainian: Валентин Костянтинович Симоненко; born 4 July 1940) is a Ukrainian politician and former Soviet Communist Party functionary. Between 1996 and 2011 he was chairman of the Accounting Chamber of Ukraine. He served also as mayor of Odesa from 1983 to 1992, 2nd First Deputy Prime Minister of Ukraine in 1992, and a People's Deputy of Ukraine from 1990–92 and 1994-98.

== Early life ==
Symonenko was born on 4 July 1940 in the city of Odesa, which was then part of the Ukrainian SSR in the Soviet Union. According to later interviews, he stated that his life in Odesa post-World War II consisted of extreme hunger, but led him to develop a desire to "build and create". In 1962, he graduated from the Odesa State Academy of Civil Engineering and Architecture. Afterwords, he was sent to work on the Kyiv Hydroelectric Power Plant as a foreman, before returning to Odesa to work at Odesa Film Studio and Ukrdiprohydroliz and then at the Illichivsk Reinforced Concrete Structures Plant as head of the technical department. By 1973, he was head of the production department of Plant No. 3 "Odessazalizobeton".

== Political career ==
In 1973, he became Head of the Department of Construction for the Odesa City Committee until 1976, when he was promoted to First Secretary of the Pimorsky District Committee of Odesa. His last post before becoming Mayor was as Second Secretary of the Odesa City Committee. Finally, from 1983 to 1992, he served as Mayor of Odesa (de jure Chairman of the Executive Committee of the Odesa City Council). His period as mayor was marked by a construction boom, and he was also appointed as Representative of the President of Ukraine in Odesa Oblast.

He then became First Vice Prime Minister of Ukraine in the Fokin government, and for period of 10 days in October 1992 (2–12 October) ex officio acted as a Prime Minister of Ukraine upon the resignation of Vitold Fokin and the appointment of Leonid Kuchma to the office. Symonenko became the first "acting Prime Minister".

Symonenko has been elected to the Verkhovna Rada (parliament) for three sequential terms (11, 12(1), and 13(2) convocations).

In 1996 he was elected as the Chairman of the Accounting Chamber of Ukraine. In 2003 he was re-elected for the second 7-year term. The Accounting Chamber executes control over revenues and expenditures of the State Budget of Ukraine on behalf of the Verkhovna Rada.

== Post-political career ==
Since his retirement from politics, he has worked as a professor at Kyiv National Economic University within the Department of Financial Audits and Analysis. He was elected a corresponding member of the National Academy of Sciences of Ukraine in 2006.

== See also ==
- Government of Ukraine
- Prime Minister of Ukraine
