= Hubenko =

Hubenko (Ukrainian: Губенко) is a Ukrainian surname. Notable people with the surname include:

- Pavlo Hubenko, real name of Ostap Vyshnya (1889–1956), Ukrainian writer, humourist, satirist, and medical official (feldsher)
- Valeriy Hubenko (1939–2000), head of the State Border Guard Service of Ukraine

== See also ==
- Gubenko
