= Mykola Zhulynskyi =

Ukrainian literary historian and politician

- Микола Жулинський
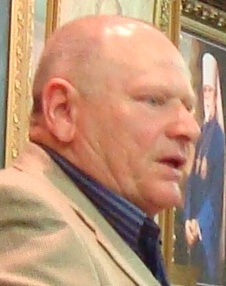
- Zhulynskyi in 2008

Deputy Prime Minister of Ukraine
- In office 30 December 1999 – 29 May 2001
- Prime Minister: Viktor Yushchenko
- In office October 1992 – August 1994
- Prime Minister: Leonid Kuchma; Vitaliy Masol

People's Deputy of Ukraine
- In office 14 May 2002 – 25 May 2006
- Constituency: Our Ukraine Bloc, No. 10
- In office 12 May 1994 – 12 May 1998
- Preceded by: Yaroslav Dmytryshyn
- Succeeded by: Constituency abolished
- Constituency: Volyn Oblast, Lutsk

Personal details
- Born: 25 August 1940 (age 86) Novosilky, Ukrainian SSR, Soviet Union (now part of Naberezhne, Ukraine)
- Party: Liberal Party of Ukraine
- Other political affiliations: Our Ukraine Bloc (2002–2006); Party of Industrialists and Entrepreneurs (2006)

Academic background
- Education: Taras Shevchenko Kyiv State University (KN, 1971; DN, 1982)
- Thesis: Do pytannia pro istorychnyi optymizm radianskoi literatury (KN, 1972); Khudozhnia kontseptsiia liudyny i problema kharakteru u suchasnii radianskii literaturi (DN, 1981)

Academic work
- Discipline: Literary criticism, literary history
- Institutions: National Academy of Sciences of Ukraine
- Main interests: Ukrainian language, Ukrainian literature (Sixtiers, Executed Renaissance, Ivan Franko), literature of the Soviet Union

Mykola Hryhorovych Zhulynskyi (Note: In this name that follows East Slavic naming customs, the patronymic is Hryhorovych and the family name is Zhulynskyi.) (Ukrainian: Мико́ла Григо́рович Жули́нський; born 25 August 1940) is a Ukrainian literary historian and politician who served as deputy prime minister of Ukraine from 1992 to 1994 and from 1999 to 2001. He was also a People's Deputy of Ukraine from 1994 to 1998 (representing Lutsk) and from 2002 to 2006 (on the electoral list of the Our Ukraine Bloc). In addition to his political career, Zhulynskyi is a professor of literary history under the National Academy of Sciences of Ukraine and secretary of the National Writers' Union of Ukraine since 1998.

== Early life and education ==
Mykola Hryhorovych Zhulynskyi was born on 25 August 1940 in the village of Novosilky, in Ukraine's northwestern Rivne Oblast (now part of the village of Naberezhne). His father was a soldier of the Polish Army and Ukrainian Insurgent Army who settled in the United States after being held in a Nazi concentration camp; the two would not meet until 1978. Between 1960 and 1968, he worked a variety of jobs, including as a teacher, at a combine and at a factory in Leningrad. From 1968, Zhulynskyi studied at the faculty of journalism at Taras Shevchenko Kyiv State University. He was also an aspirant under the Academy of Sciences of Ukraine.

== Academic career ==
Zhulynskyi's Candidate of Sciences dissertation, The question on the historical optimism of Soviet literature, (Note: Ukrainian: До питання про історичний оптимізм радянської літератури, romanized: Do pytannia pro istorychnyi optymizm radianskoi literatury) was accepted in 1972. His Doctor of Sciences thesis, The artistic concept of people and the problem of character in modern Soviet literature, (Note: Ukrainian: Художня концепція людини і проблема характеру у сучасній радянській літературі, romanized: Khudozhnia kontseptsiia liudyny i problema kharakteru u suchasnii radianskii literaturi) was accepted in 1981, with both theses being defended before the Institute of Literature of the Academy of Sciences of Ukraine. Zhulynskyi's early academic works in the late 1970s primarily focused on both the Sixtiers and older, more established Ukrainian authors of the time (such as Oles Honchar and Mykhailo Stelmakh). By the late 1980s, he was among the first Ukrainian literary historians to openly discuss the authors of the Executed Renaissance, as well as the works of Ukrainian nationalist writers who fled westward after World War II. Zhulynskyi's 1990 book From Oblivion to Immortality, discussing Ukrainian literature banned by the Soviet government, was awarded the 1992 Shevchenko National Prize. He joined the Writers' Union of Ukraine in 1977, and became the organisation's secretary in 1998.

Zhulynskyi's works since 1991 have focused on Ukrainian literature from the 18th century onwards. A number of his works are about Ivan Franko, to the extent that academic Yevhen Nakhlik classifies Zhulynskyi as a scholar of Franko. Of particular focus for Zhulynskyi is Franko's ideology; Nakhlik argues that Zhulynskyi has sought to disconnect Franko from his Soviet-era image as a socialist writer in favour of more diverse readings of his politics, including liberal democracy and opposition to social democracy in Germany and Russia.

== Political career ==
During the 1989–1991 Ukrainian revolution, Zhulynskyi was a member of the People's Movement of Ukraine prior to its transition into a political party. He was appointed deputy prime minister of Ukraine in October 1992, during the premiership of Leonid Kuchma, and left the government in August 1994. Zhulynskyi was one of five members of the anti-communist national democratic bloc to be appointed to positions in the Kuchma government, alongside Ihor Yukhnovskyi, Oleksandr Yemets, Viktor Pynzenyk and Taras Stetskiv.

Zhulynskyi was elected to the Verkhovna Rada (Ukrainian parliament) at the 1994 Ukrainian parliamentary election, representing Lutsk as an independent. In the Rada, he joined the Constitutional Centre group and was a member of the Culture and Spiritual Committee, serving as head of the Subcommittee on Creative Activities, Art, Language, and Cultural Education Policies. After the 1998 Ukrainian parliamentary election, he returned to work as director of the Institute of Literature at the National Academy of Sciences. From March 1999 to March 2005, Zhulynskyi was deputy chairman of the Liberal Party of Ukraine.

After Viktor Yushchenko became prime minister, Zhulynskyi was again appointed deputy prime minister on 30 December 1999. In this capacity, he headed committees on recovery of Nazi plunder and welfare reform. He left office on 29 May 2001, and was re-elected to the Verkhovna Rada in the 2002 Ukrainian parliamentary election, this time as the tenth candidate on the electoral list of Yushchenko's Our Ukraine Bloc. He left the Our Ukraine Bloc in 2006 to join the Party of Industrialists and Entrepreneurs and was appointed to head the Presidential Council on Culture and Spirituality in January 2006, returning to his position as director of the Institute of Literature in June of the same year. In November 2008, Yushchenko, in his capacity as president, appointed Zhulynskyi as head of the committee awarding the Shevchenko National Prize.
