= Volodymyr Borysovsky =

Ukrainian builder, electrician, politician

- Володимир Борисовський

Minister of Installation and Special Construction
- In office 13 March 1981 – 18 September 1987

Deputy chairman of the Council of Ministers of Ukraine
- In office 18 September 1987 – 1991
- Prime Minister: Vitaly Masol

Minister of Investments and Construction
- In office 5 June 1991 – 30 December 1992
- Prime Minister: Vitold Fokin

Personal details
- Born: April 25, 1933 Debaltseve, Ukrainian SSR
- Died: February 2012 (aged 78)
- Party: Communist Party of Ukraine
- Education: Kyiv Polytechnic Institute
- Occupation: Politician, builder, electrical engineer

Volodymyr Zakharovych Borysovsky (1933–2012) was a Ukrainian builder, electrical engineer, politician.

== Early life ==
Borysovsky was from Donetsk Oblast. He graduated Igor Sikorsky Kyiv Polytechnic Institute in 1956 and until 1963 worked as an electrician and electrical engineer in Kryvyi Rih.

== Professional career ==
In 1961, he joined the Communist Party of the Soviet Union. In 1963–70, Borysovsky worked at the Dnipropetrovsk regional committee of the Communist Party of Ukraine.

== Death ==
He died 11 February 2012.
