= Anatoliy Baranovsky =

Ukrainian politician

- Анатолій Барановський

Ministry of Finance of the Ukrainian SSR
- In office 1961–1979
- Prime Minister: Volodymyr Shcherbytsky Oleksandr Lyashko
- Preceded by: Mykola Shchetinin
- Succeeded by: Vasyl Kozeruk

Chairman of Derzhplan
- In office 1954–1957
- Prime Minister: Nykyfor Kalchenko
- Preceded by: Vasyl Harbuzov
- Succeeded by: Ivan Senin

Ministry of Foreign Affairs of the Ukrainian SSR
- In office 1952–1954
- Prime Minister: Demyan Korotchenko
- Preceded by: Dmitry Manuilsky
- Succeeded by: Luka Palamarchuk

Personal details
- Born: Anatoliy Maksymovych Baranovsky; 25 January 1906 Kiev, Russian Empire
- Died: 9 November 1988 (aged 82) Kiev, Ukrainian SSR, USSR
- Party: CPSU
- Education: Kharkiv Institute of Planning DerzhPlan Ukrainian SSR

Anatoliy Maksymovych Baranovsky (Ukrainian: Анатолій Максимович Барановський) (25 January 1906 – 9 November 1988) was a Ukrainian politician, economist and diplomat. He was Minister of Foreign Affairs of the Ukrainian SSR from 1952 to 1954 and Ministry of Finance of the Ukrainian SSR from 1961 to 1979.

== Education ==
Born in Kiev in 1906, Anatoliy Baranovsky graduated from Kharkiv Institute of Planning DerzhPlan in the Ukrainian SSR in 1933.

== Professional career and experience ==
In 1920–1930 he worked an employee of the tax office, the Komsomol and Soviet bodies Zhytomyr.

In 1933 he was a Senior Economist at the sector, department, deputy head of the State Planning Committee of the Ukrainian SSR.

In 1941 he was Deputy Chairman of People's Commissars of the Ukrainian SSR.

Since the beginning of the War in the offensive Nazi troops in Ukraine spends much work to evacuate important companies in the east to establish mass production of weapons and ammunition.

In 1941–1942 — Head of the Task Force on Industry Military Council of the Southern Front,

During 1942–1944 he worked expert Soviet Foreign Minister for Economic Affairs, participated in the preparation of economic articles (agreements) for an armistice with the Allies in Germany during World War II.

In the years 1944–1952 he was Deputy Chairman of The Council of Ministers of the Ukrainian SSR.

December 18, 1945 – he on behalf of the government of the Ukrainian SSR signed in Washington, D.C. an agreement on assistance to Ukraine international Organizations assistance to victims of war.

In March–May 1945 - Head of the Ukrainian delegation at the IV session of the organization. Participates in the Paris Peace Treaties, 1947.

Head of Delegation of the Ukrainian SSR at the Belgrade Conference of 1948, which developed the Convention on Navigation on the Danube River.

June 10, 1951 – May 10, 1954 — Minister of Foreign Affairs of the Ukrainian SSR

1950–1954 — headed the Ukrainian delegation to V-VIII sessions of the UN General Assembly.

In 1954–1957 — Chairman of the State Planning Commission, Deputy Chairman of the Council of Ministers of the Ukrainian SSR,

in 1957–1961 — first deputy chairman of the State Planning Commission - Minister of Ukraine.

In 1961–1979 he was Ministry of Finance of the Ukrainian SSR.

He died in Kiev on November 9, 1988 at the age of 82.

== Diplomatic rank ==
- Ambassador Extraordinary and Plenipotentiary
