= Kostyantyn Masyk =

Ukrainian diplomat

- Костянтин Масик

Deputy Chairman of the Council of Ministers of the Ukrainian SSR
- In office 11 September 1981 – 18 August 1986
- Prime Minister: Oleksandr Liashko
- In office July 1989 – 3 August 1990
- Prime Minister: Vitaliy Masol

First Deputy Chairman of the Council of Ministers of the Ukrainian SSR
- In office 3 August 1990 – October 1992
- Prime Minister: Vitaliy Masol; Vitold Fokin

Prime Minister of Ukraine (acting, ex officio)
- In office October 1990 – November 1990
- Preceded by: Vitaliy Masol
- Succeeded by: Vitold Fokin
- In office August 1991 – August 1991
- Preceded by: Vitold Fokin
- Succeeded by: Vitold Fokin

Ambassador of Ukraine to Finland (concurrently Sweden, Norway, and Denmark)
- In office 1992 – June 1997
- President: Leonid Kravchuk; Leonid Kuchma
- Preceded by: post revived (Petro Slyvenko in 1920-22)
- Succeeded by: Ihor Podolyev

Personal details
- Born: Kostyantyn Ivanovych Masyk; 9 July 1936 (age 90) Volochysk, Vinnytsia Oblast, Ukrainian SSR, Soviet Union
- Party: Communist Party of Ukraine (1962–1991)
- Occupation: state official, diplomat
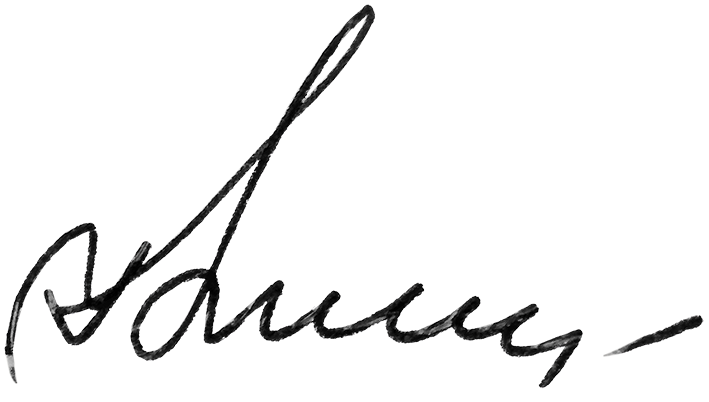
- Signature

Kostyantyn Ivanovych Masyk (Ukrainian: Костянтин Іванович Масик; 9 July 1936) is a Soviet and Ukrainian state official and diplomat.

Masyk was born in Volochysk. A graduate of the Gorky Institute of Water Transport Engineers, Masyk's working career started at the Kyiv factory of ship construction and repair in 1959–60. In 1960s he became an activist of Komsomol of Ukraine becoming its first secretary in Kyiv and Kyiv Oblast.

In 1962 Masyk joined the Communist Party of the Soviet Union and finished the Higher Party School. In 1970s he served on the party's positions in Kyiv and Odesa. In 1980s Masyk was a deputy chairman of council of ministers of the Ukrainian SSR and the First secretary of the Kyiv city party committee.

In 1990-1992 Masyk was a first deputy chairman and vice-prime Minister of Ukraine and was acting head of government soon after ousting of Vitaliy Masol following the 1990 Kyiv students' hunger strike.

In 1992–1997 he served as an ambassador of Ukraine to Finland and after that director of Nadra Bank.

Later Masyk joined Party of Regions.

Political offices
Preceded by	Director of Nadra Bank; 1997	Succeeded by
