= Olyshivka =

Rural locality in Chernihiv Oblast, Ukraine

Olyshivka Олишівка
- Rural settlement
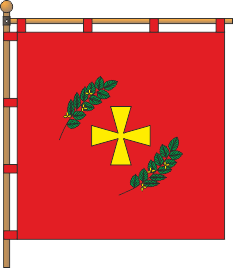
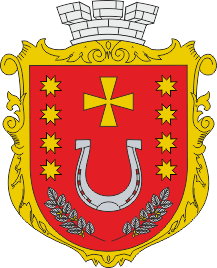
- Flag Coat of arms

- Location within Chernihiv Oblast Location within Ukraine
- Coordinates: 51°13′17″N 31°19′58″E
- Country: Ukraine
- Oblast: Chernihiv Oblast
- Raion: Chernihiv Raion

Population (2022)
  - Total: 1,794
- Time zone: UTC+2 (EET)
  - Summer (DST): UTC+3 (EEST)

Olyshivka (Ukrainian: Олишівка; Russian: Олишевка) is a rural settlement in Chernihiv Raion, Chernihiv Oblast, northern Ukraine. It is located about 20 kilometres (12 mi) south of the city of Chernihiv. It hosts the administration of Olyshivka settlement hromada, one of the hromadas of Ukraine. Population: 1,794 (2022 estimate).

Until 26 January 2024, Olyshivka was designated urban-type settlement. On this day, a new law entered into force which abolished this status, and Olyshivka became a rural settlement.

== Geography ==
The Olyshivka is located in the east of Chernihiv raion, on the left bank of the Desna River. The territory of the Olyshivka is located within the Dnieper Lowland, belonging to the Dnieper basin. A tributary of the Desna River - Smolyanka flows through the territory of the settlement. The relief of the Olyshivka surface is lowland, a slightly undulating plain. There are swamps around the settlement.

The climate of the Olyshivka is moderately continental, with warm summers and relatively mild winters. The average temperature in January is about -8 °C, and in July - +20.0 °C. The average annual precipitation ranges from 550 to 660 mm, with the highest amount of precipitation in the summer period.

The most common sod-podzolic soils. The Olyshivka is located in the natural zone of mixed forests, in Polissya. The main species in the forests are pine, oak, alder. Minerals - loam, peat, sand.

== Economy ==
=== Transportation ===
Olyshivka has access to the Highway M01, connecting Chernihiv and Kyiv. In the other direction, the road connects Olyshivka with Kulykivka.

== Notable people ==
- Vitaliy Masol (1928–2018), Soviet-Ukrainian politician, Head of the Council of Ministers 1987–1990, Prime Minister 1994–1995.
