= Gubenko =

Gubenko (Russian: Губенко) is a gender-neutral Slavic surname of Ukrainian origin that may refer to:

- Nikita Gubenko (born 1994), Russian slalom canoeist
- Nikolai Gubenko (1941–2020), Soviet actor, film and theatre director
- Julius Gubenko (born 1924), professionally known as Terry Gibbs, American jazz musician

In Russia, 3,818 people bear the surname Gubenko, most of them in Krasnodar Krai and Rostov Oblast. Apart from Russia, where it is most common, this surname occurs in 24 other countries.

== See also ==
- and
- Hubenko
