= Mykhailo Kaskevych =

Ukrainian politician and economist

- Михайло Каскевич

Head of the State Committee for Consumer Rights Protection of Ukraine
- In office 30 September 1999 – 10 January 2000
- Prime Minister: Valeriy Pustovoitenko
- Preceded by: Stanislav Syvokon

Governor of Chernihiv Oblast
- In office 30 April 1998 – 12 August 1999
- President: Leonid Kuchma
- Prime Minister: Valeriy Pustovoitenko
- Preceded by: Petro Shapoval
- Succeeded by: Mykola Butko

Minister of Labour
- In office 29 October 1991 – 8 August 1996
- President: Leonid Kravchuk; Leonid Kuchma
- Prime Minister: Vitold Fokin; Leonid Kuchma; Vitaliy Masol; Yevhen Marchuk; Pavlo Lazarenko
- Preceded by: Vitaliy Vasylchenko
- Succeeded by: Mykola Biloblotskyi

Personal details
- Born: 17 February 1948 Nizhyn, Ukrainian SSR, Soviet Union (now Ukraine)
- Died: 20 June 2004 (aged 56) Kyiv, Ukraine
- Education: Kyiv National Economic University

Mykhailo Hryhorovych Kaskevych (Ukrainian: Михайло Григорович Каскевич; 17 February 1948 – 20 July 2004) was a Ukrainian politician and economist.

== Biography ==
Mykhailo Kaskevych was born in 1948 in Nizhyn, Chernihiv Oblast, Ukrainian SSR. After graduating from Kyiv National Economic University in 1973 started a career in public service. Held multiple positions with Ukrainian SSR governing bodies — DerzhPlan and Council of Ministers.

Weeks before the Declaration of Independence of Ukraine was appointed a Deputy Minister of Industrial Privatization and Demonopolization of Ukrainian SSR (the government body later transformed into State Property Fund of Ukraine).

On 29 October 1991 he became a member of the first Cabinet of the independent Ukraine, Fokin government, as the Minister of Labour. Held this office for almost five years, serving in Cabinets of five consecutive Prime Ministers. Resigned on 8 August 1996.

In the late 1990s and early 2000s he had a number of positions in public service, most notably as the Governor of Chernihiv Oblast since May 1998 till August 1999. He was appointed Executive Secretary of the National Securities and Stock Market Commission in 2003.

He died on 20 June 2004, in Kyiv. A heart attack was reported as the cause of death. He is buried at Baikove Cemetery.
