= DerzhPlan =

State Planning Committee
- Derzhavnyi Planovyi Komitet URSR; Державний плановий комітет УРСР

State committee overview
- Formed: September 28, 1921
- Jurisdiction: Government of the Ukrainian SSR
- Headquarters: Kyiv, Ukrainian SSR; 55°45′27″N 37°36′55″E
- Parent State committee: Gosplan and Council of Ministers of the Ukrainian SSR

The DerzhPlan of the Ukrainian SSR (Ukrainian: Держплан УРСР, Russian: Госплан УССР) or State Planning Committee of the Ukrainian SSR was a union-republican authority that conducted state planning of economical and social development of the Ukrainian SSR and controlled execution of national economical plans.

The committee was created on September 28, 1921 as the Ukrainian Commonly-planned Economic Commission as part of the Ukrainian Economical Conference. Later it was subordinated to the Council of People's Commissars (since 1946 - Council of Ministers) of the Ukrainian SSR and the Gosplan (until 1922 - of the Russian SFSR) of the USSR. The base of its organization and activities was the principle of democratic centralism.

== Purpose ==
Derzhplan was developing perspective and annual state plans of economical and social development of the Ukrainian SSR in accordance with program of the Communist Party of the Soviet Union, statements of the party's congresses and the Communist Party of Ukraine, decisions of the Central Committee of the Communist Party of the Soviet Union and the Council of Ministers of the USSR, the Central Committee of Communist Party of Ukraine and Council of Ministers of the Ukrainian SSR and instructions of the Gosplan of the USSR. The plans ensure a proportional development of national economy of the republic, a continuous growth and increase efficiency of public production, a rapid growth of national income, a further scientific-technical progress and a labor productivity growth. Those plans also provide a rational use of based funds and production capacities, material, labor, natural and financial resources, improving product quality, specialization of economy of the Ukrainian SSR in the All-Union division of labor in order to increase contribution in creation of the material-technical base of communism, steady increase of the living standards of the people. Developing plans, the committee provides a rational allocation of productive forces on a territory of the republic based on specialization and cooperation in production and integrated development of regional economies and economic districts.

== Chairman of Derzhplan ==
Unlike the rest of members of the committee who were elected by the Council of Ministers, the chairman of Derzhplan was appointed by the Central Executive Committee of the Ukrainian SSR (since 1937 - Verkhovna Rada).

- November 1922 - November 1923 Hryhoriy Hrynko
- 1923 - 1924 Mikhail Vladimirsky
- June 1925 - December 1926 Hryhoriy Hrynko
- 1926 - 1933 Yakym Dudnyk
- February 1933 - July 7, 1933 Mykola Skrypnyk
- 1933 - November 1934 Yuri Kotsyubynsky
- 1935 - May 1938 Kyrylo Sukhomlyn
- July 1938 - May 28, 1940 Oleksiy Usykov
- May 28, 1940 - 1941 Anatoliy Baranovsky
- 1943 - 1950 Volodymyr Valuyev
- 1950 - 1952 Vasyl Harbuzov
- 1954 - 1957 Anatoliy Baranovsky
- 1957 - 1959 Ivan Senin
- 1959 - 1963 Petro Rozenko
- March 1963 - December 14, 1966 Anton Kochubei
- 1966 - 1967 I.Starovoitenko
- March 1967 - 1979 Petro Rozenko
- January 1979 - July 1987 Vitaliy Masol
- July 1987 - 1990 Vitold Fokin

== See also ==
- Ministry of Economic Development and Trade (Ukraine), successor of the committee
