= Viktor Bannykh =

Viktor Bannykh (Ukrainian: Віктор Іванович Банних; June 28, 1949 – August 14, 2003) was the commander of the State Border Guard Service of Ukraine in 1994–1999, General Colonel.

Military offices
Preceded by Valeriy Hubenko	Commander of the Border Troops of Ukraine; October 1994–December 1999 until January 1995 acting	Succeeded by Borys Oleksiyenko
