= Andriy Vasylyshyn =

Ukrainian militsiya general (1933–2023)

- Андрій Василишин

Minister of Interior
- In office 26 July 1990 – 21 July 1994
- Prime Minister: Vitold Fokin; Leonid Kuchma
- Preceded by: Ivan Hladush (as Minister of Ukrainian SSR)
- Succeeded by: Volodymyr Radchenko

Personal details
- Born: 24 April 1933 Vesnyanka, Starokostiantyniv Raion, Vinnytsia Oblast, Ukrainian SSR, USSR
- Died: 12 October 2023 (aged 90)

Military service
- Allegiance: Soviet Union; Ukraine
- Branch/service: Soviet Army; Militsiya
- Rank: General of Interior Service

Andriy Volodymyrovych Vasylyshyn (Ukrainian: Андрій Володимирович Василишин; 24 April 1933 – 12 October 2023) was a Ukrainian Militsiya general. He was the first interior minister of the independent Ukraine.

== Early life and education ==
Vasylyshyn was born on 24 April 1933 into a peasant family of kolkhoz in the village of Vesnyanka, Starokostiantyniv Raion, Vinnytsia Oblast (today in Khmelnytskyi Oblast), in the historical region of Volhynia. In 1950 he graduated from a training center of Ministry of Soviet Farms of the Soviet Union.

== Career ==
Vasylyshyn was an army general and held the rank of lieutenant general. He was appointed interior minister to the cabinet led by Prime Minister Vitold Fokin following the fall of the communist regime in 1991. He was reappointed to the post in the cabinet led by Prime Minister Leonid Kuchma in October 1992. He was dismissed by the Prime Minister in July 1994. He was replaced by Volodymyr Radchenko in the post.

Vasylyshyn was the president of the International Police Association Ukrainian section and an advisor to Ukraine's ministry of interior.

== Death ==
Andriy Vasylyshyn died on 12 October 2023, at the age of 90.
