= Ivan Kuras =

Ukrainian political scientist

Ivan Fedorovych Kuras (October 3, 1939, in Nemyrivske — October 16, 2005, in Kyiv) was a Ukrainian scientist-political scientist, public and political figure, academician (from April 14, 1995) and vice-president of the National Academy of Sciences of Ukraine, founder of the Institute of Political and Ethnonational Studies of the National Academy of Sciences of Ukraine. He was a member of the Communist Party of the Soviet Union (CPSU) and a member of the Party of Regions faction in the Verkhovna Rada.

== Biography ==
=== Education ===
Born on October 3, 1939, in Nemyrivske, he graduated from the Odesa State University with honors in 1962.

=== Career ===
After university, he worked as a research associate at the Kirovograd Party Archive, simultaneously teaching at the Kirovograd branch of the Kharkiv Polytechnic Institute. In 1964, he enrolled in graduate school at Kyiv State University, where he prepared and defended a doctoral dissertation on the national liberation movement in Ukraine in the early 20th century. He taught at Kyiv University until 1970.

From 1970 to 1972, he was a senior research fellow and scientific secretary at the Institute of Party History at the Central Committee of the Communist Party of Ukraine—a branch of the Institute of Marxism-Leninism at the CC CPSU. From 1972 to 1983, he served as an instructor, consultant, and head of the department's sector of science and educational institutions at the Central Committee of the Communist Party of Ukraine, and from 1983 to 1991, he was the deputy director of the Institute of Political Studies at the Central Committee of the Communist Party of Ukraine. From December 1991, he was the director of the Institute of National Relations and Political Science of the National Academy of Sciences of Ukraine (from 1996—Institute of Political and Ethnonational Studies of the National Academy of Sciences of Ukraine).

From 1988 to 1993, he was the academic secretary of the Department of History, Philosophy, and Law of the National Academy of Sciences of Ukraine, a member of the Presidium of the National Academy of Sciences of Ukraine. From 1998 to 2005, he was the vice-president of the National Academy of Sciences of Ukraine. From 1994 to 1997, he served as Deputy Prime Minister of Ukraine for Humanitarian Affairs. From 1994 to 1996, he was a member of the Constitutional Commission under the President of Ukraine. He chaired state commissions on the affairs of deported peoples of Crimea; on the affairs of deported Germans; on juvenile affairs; on the coordination, reception, transportation, protection, and distribution of humanitarian aid coming from foreign countries, under the Cabinet of Ministers of Ukraine; on the reform of higher education in Ukraine; and on reorganization in the field of science. From 1994 to 2002, he was a member of the Commission on State Awards under the President of Ukraine. In 1997, he was the chairman of the Council on Language Policy under the President of Ukraine, and from 1997 to 1998, the Council on the Preservation of National Cultural Heritage. From October 2000, by the government's decree, he was the chairman of the supervisory board of the National Joint-Stock Company "Nadra Ukrainy", and from 2003, the chairman of the supervisory board of the Kyiv National Medical University, the secretary of the Political Council under the President of Ukraine.

From April 2002 to March 2005, he was People's Deputy of Ukraine of the 4th convocation, elected from the lists of the Electoral Bloc of Political Parties "For a Single Ukraine!". From April 20, 2002, to January 18, 2005, he was a member of the faction of the Party of Regions. He headed the subcommittee on inter-parliamentary relations of the VRU Committee on Foreign Affairs. He led the working group on the development of the Concept for Reforming the Political System of Ukraine.

He lived in Kyiv. Died on October 16, 2005. Buried in Kyiv at the Baikove Cemetery (section No. 52a).

== Scientific achievements ==
A significant event was the publication in 1990 of the scientific-documentary edition "The Famine of 1932-1933 in Ukraine: Through the Eyes of Historians, in the Language of Documents". This collection of articles and documents was the first documentary publication of documents from the highest party-state instances and attest to their undeniable involvement in the infernal events of the 1930s.

Long before the collapse of the USSR, I.F. Kuras raised the issue of the necessity to study national relations before the leadership of the Ukrainian SSR. He initiated the creation of a sector for the history, theory, and practice of interethnic relations at the Institute of Party History and consistently built the corresponding scientific school. In December 1991, the Institute of National Relations and Political Science of the National Academy of Sciences of Ukraine was created, with I.F. Kuras as its director. Under Kuras's leadership, the institute achieved significant achievements in the theoretical-methodological substantiation of the new direction of socio-humanitarian sciences—ethnopolitics, the development of the object-subject area of political science and ethnopolitics, and the refinement of the conceptual-categorical apparatus of these sciences, understanding the dialectic of interaction between ethnic and political, ethnic and regional factors. The ethnonational specificity, character, and peculiarities of the political process and political culture in past and present Ukraine, the religious situation, and the interrelations of different confessions were studied.

== Honors ==
Awarded the title of Merited Worker of Science and Technology of Ukraine (from 1998), laureate of the State Prize of Ukraine in Science and Technology (for 1999).

Awarded the Order of Friendship of Peoples, the Order of the Great Cross (1997; Italy), the Order of the Prince Gediminas 4th degree (1998; Lithuania), the Order of Prince Yaroslav the Wise 5th (1999) and 4th (2003) degrees.

== Memorialization ==
In 2005, by the decision of the Presidium of the National Academy of Sciences of Ukraine, the Institute of Political and Ethnonational Studies of the National Academy of Sciences of Ukraine was named after I. F. Kuras.

On December 20, 2016, a ceremony was held to unveil a memorial plaque on the facade of the Institute of Political and Ethnonational Studies named after I. F. Kuras of the National Academy of Sciences of Ukraine (Kyiv, General Almazov St., 8) to its first director, academician, vice-president of the National Academy of Sciences of Ukraine, Ivan Fedorovych Kuras.

== Sources and literature ==
- Yu. I. Shapoval. Ivan Fedorovych Kuras // Енциклопедія історії України : у 10 т. / редкол.: В. А. Смолій (голова) та ін. ; Інститут історії України НАН України. — К. : Наукова думка, 2009. — Т. 5 : Кон — Кю. — С. 512.
- V. F. Soldatenko. Ivan Fedorovych Kuras // Енциклопедія сучасної України / ред. кол.: І. М. Дзюба [та ін.] ; НАН України, НТШ. — К. : Інститут енциклопедичних досліджень НАН України, 2001–2023. — ISBN 966-02-2074-X.

=== Literature ===
- Yu. Shapoval. Ivan Fedorovych Kuras // Political Encyclopedia. Eds.: Yu. Levenets (chief), Yu. Shapoval (deputy) et al. — K.: Parliamentary Publishing, 2011. — p. 382 ISBN 978-966-611-818-2

== Links ==
- On the website Vernadsky National Library
