= Oleksiy Koval =

Ukrainian property developer and business executive

- Олексій Борисович Коваль
- Born: 25 January 1985 (age 41); Kosikha, Altai Krai, Russian SFSR, Soviet Union
- Citizenship: Ukraine
- Education: Kyiv National Economic University; Kyiv National University of Construction and Architecture
- Occupations: Property developer, business executive
- Known for: CEO of Perfect Group
- Awards

Oleksiy Borysovych Koval (born 25 January 1985) is a Ukrainian property developer and chief executive officer of Perfect Group. He heads the privately held joint-stock company Financial Company Kniahynia Yaroslavna and is a member of the board of directors of the Confederation of Builders of Ukraine. He writes about the property market, construction finance and housing policy.

== Awards ==
He has received the Medal "Honor. Glory. State" – instituted and awarded by the Kyiv City Council.
