= Ivan Senin =

Soviet Ukrainian politician

- Born: Ivan Semenovych Senin; 26 December 1903; Bakhmut uezd, Yekaterinoslav Governorate, Russian Empire
- Died: July 1981 (age 77); Kyiv, Ukrainian SSR, Soviet Union
- Occupations: Member of the Central Committee of the Communist Party of the Soviet Union, People's Deputy
- Spouse: Klavdiya Vykhreva

Ivan Semenovych Senin (Ukrainian: Іван Семенович Сєнін; 26 December 1903 – July 1981) was the First Deputy Chairman of the Council of Ministers of the USSR, a member of the Central Committee of the Communist Party of the Soviet Union, and a Member of the Presidium of the Communist Party of Ukraine.

== Biography ==
Ivan Senin was born in 1903, into a miner's family in Bakhmut uezd. In 1917 he graduated from school in Petrovskyi, and started working at the mine No. 19 at Rutchenkovo, where for four years he was a lamp carrier, and horse driver. In 1921, he was elected the secretary of Rutchenkovo Komsomol committee. In autumn 1922, Senin began studying at Donetsk technical school named after Artem. After the workers' school Ivan Senin graduated from Polytechnic Institute in Kyiv in 1930, then he entered postgraduate school. In 1931 he was appointed the Head engineer of the Kyiv factory "Krasny Humovyk" and in 1932 he worked as Director of "Ukrkabel" plant. In 1938 Ivan Senin was appointed Deputy People's Commissar of USSR consumer industry, and in a year he became People's Commissar.

=== World War II ===
In 1940-1942 Ivan Senin was appointed the Deputy Chairman of People's Commissars of the USSR. In 1941, during World War II he led the command group of the Southwestern Front, starting from December 1942 he worked in the Central Committee. In 1943 he's back for the position of Deputy Chairman of People's Commissars, in 1943-1953 he worked in the position of the Deputy Head of Council of Ministers.

== Political activities ==
In 1949–1965 years he was the member of the Politburo, later - member of Presidium of the Central Committee of Ukrainian TsK VKP(b), in 1956–1961 years - candidate member to the Communist Party Central Committee, in 1961–1966 years - member of the Communist Party Central Committee, Deputy of Supreme Soviet of the Ukrainian SSR (1947–1967) and of Supreme Soviet of the Soviet Union (1946–1966). In the period of 1953-1965 Ivan Senin was appointed the First Deputy Head of Government (in 1957-1959 - the Head of Gosplan of USSR).

As a member of USSR delegation, in 1945 Ivan Senin participated in the UN conference in San Francisco, in 1947 in Paris on behalf of USSR Government he signed peace treaties with Italy, Finland, Bulgaria, Romania and Hungary.

Ivan Senin died in July 1981. He was buried in Kyiv, at Baikove Cemetery.

== Awards and honors ==
- Four Orders of Lenin (1945, 1948, 1958, 1963)
- Order of the Red Banner of Labour (1940)
