= Valeriy Hubenko =

Ukrainian military leader (1939–2000)

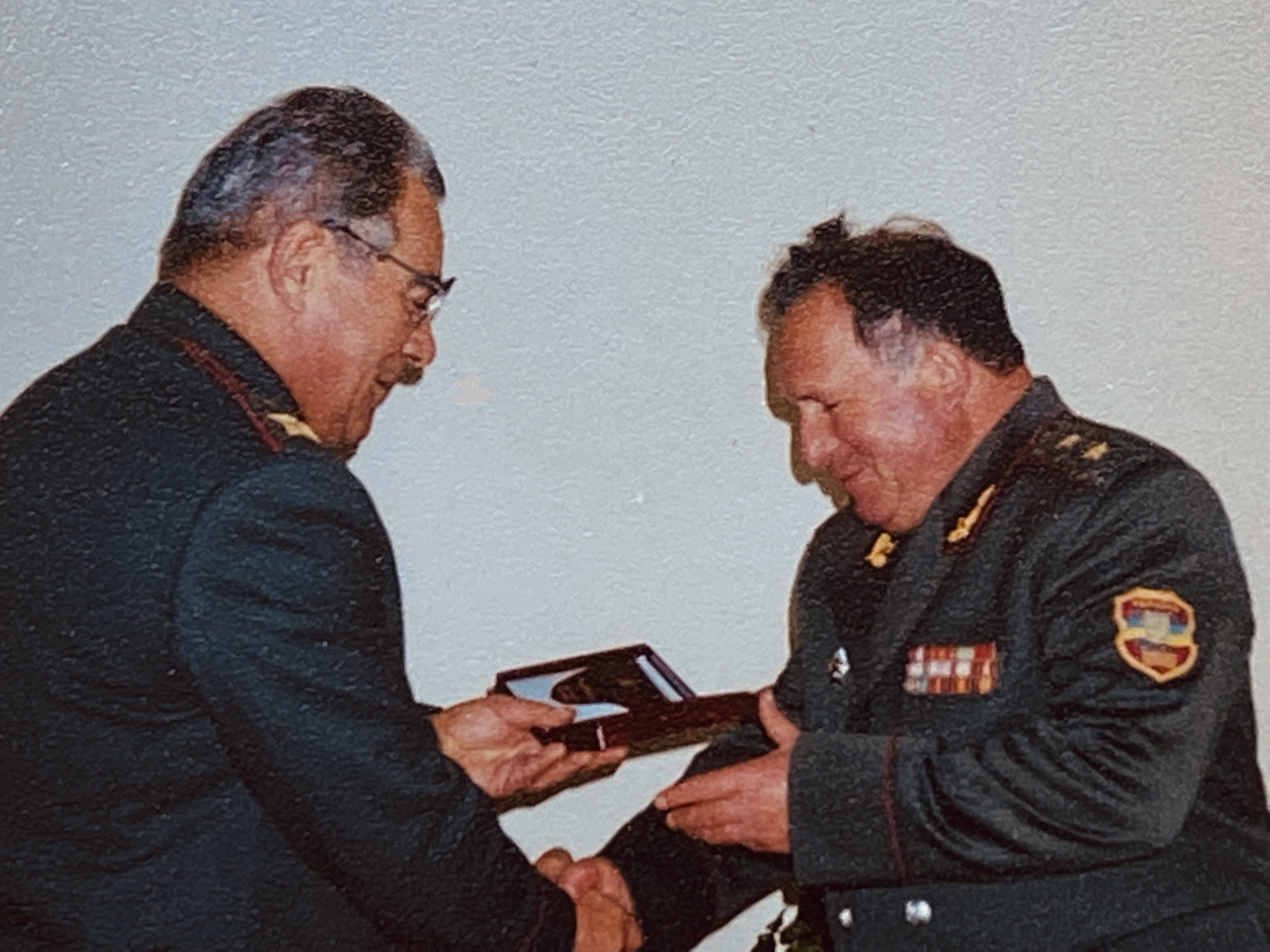
- In office 24 August 1991 – 21 July 1994
- Prime Minister: Vitold Fokin; Leonid Kuchma

Personal details
- Born: January 25, 1939 Kyiv, Ukraine
- Died: February 19, 2000 (aged 61)

Military service
- Allegiance: Soviet Union; Ukraine
- Branch/service: Soviet Border Troops; State Border Guard Service of Ukraine
- Years of service: 1953-1994
- Rank: General of the Army

Valeriy Oleksandrovych Hubenko (Ukrainian: Валерій Олександрович Губенко, 1939–2000) was a Ukrainian military leader. He was the very first chief of the State Border Guard Service of Ukraine in 1991–1994, the second recipient of the General of the Army of Ukraine (1994).

== Biography ==
He was born on January 25, 1939, in Kyiv, Ukraine. He began his career in Melitopol. In 1958, he was drafted into the Border Guard troops and served in the Georgian Border District.

Military offices
Preceded by Aleksei Shelestov	Commander of the Transbaikal Border District (USSR); 1987–1990	Succeeded by Konstantin Pleshko
Preceded by Volodymyr Stus	Commander of the Western Border District (USSR); 1990–1991	Succeeded by himself as Commander of the Border Troops of Ukraine
Preceded by himself as Western Border District (USSR)	Commander of the Border Troops of Ukraine; 1991–1994	Succeeded by Viktor Bannykh
Preceded by	Inspector General General Military Inspectorate under the President of Ukraine; 1995–1998	Succeeded by Vasyl Sobkov
