= Roman Shpek =

Ukrainian diplomat (born 1954)

- Роман Шпек
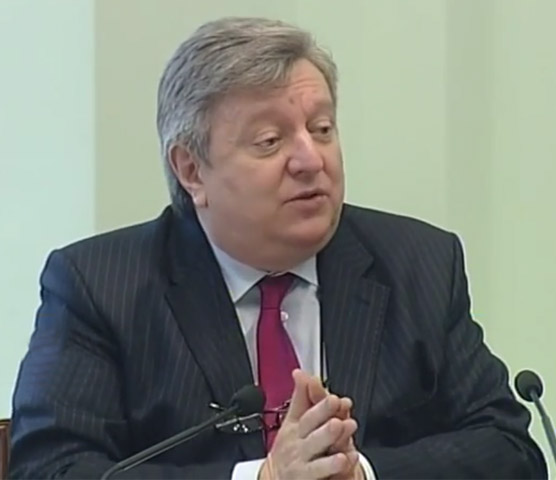
- Shpek in 2014

Chairman of the Supervisory Board of Alfa-Bank (Ukraine)
- Incumbent
- Assumed office 2019

Minister of Economy of Ukraine
- In office 1993–1995
- President: Leonid Kravchuk; Leonid Kuchma
- Prime Minister: Leonid Kuchma; Vitaliy Masol
- Preceded by: Yuriy Bannikov
- Succeeded by: Vasyl Hureyev

People's Deputy of Ukraine

2nd convocation
- In office 1994–1997

Personal details
- Born: 10 November 1954 (age 71) Broshniv-Osada, Ivano-Frankivsk region
- Education: Ukrainian National Forestry University

Roman Vasylovych Shpek (November 10, 1954, Broshniv-Osada, Ivano-Frankivsk region) is a Ukrainian diplomat and statesman.

People's Deputy of Ukraine of the II convocation (1994-1997) and Minister of Economy of Ukraine in 1993–1995.

He holds a diplomatic rank of the Ambassador Extraordinary and Plenipotentiary (2002). Permanent Representative of Ukraine to the European Union in 2000–2007. He was a member of the National Bank of Ukraine. Minister of Economy of Ukraine in 1993–1995.

He was a senior adviser of PJSC "Alfa-Bank (Ukraine)" (Kyiv). Since October 2019, chairman of the supervisory board of Alfa-Bank Ukraine.

== Education ==
In 1976, he graduated with honours from Ukrainian National Forestry University majoring in "Engineering and technology" (started studying in 1971); in 1991, he graduated from the International Institute of Management (IIM-Kyiv) and gained an MBA in International Economics.

== Career ==
In 1976-1978 - he worked as engineer, Chief of Osmoloda Forestry Enterprise in Rozhniativ Raion, Ivano-Frankivsk region, Ukraine.

In 1978-1985 - Engineering Officer, from 1981 – Director of Verkhovynsky Forestry Enterprise in Ivano-Frankivsk region.

In 1985-1989 - Director of Vorokhtiansky Forestry Enterprise in Ivano-Frankivsk region.

In 1989-1992 - Deputy Chairman of the State Committee of Ukraine for the wood industry.

From March 1992 to October 1992 – Minister of the Cabinet of Ministers of Ukraine in Affairs of State Property Privatization and De-monopolization of Industry.

In 1992-1993 - First Deputy Minister of Economy of Ukraine.

In 1993 Shpek was appointed Minister of Economy of Ukraine.

From May 11, 1994 – May 12, 1998 – People's deputy of Ukraine of the II convocation (elected in the 1994 Ukrainian parliamentary election as a single-mandate candidate from Ivano-Frankivsk region).

In 1995-1996 - Deputy Prime Minister for Economic Affairs of Ukraine.

In 1996-2000 - Head of the National Agency for Reconstruction and Development, (from 1998 - National Agency for Development and European Integration).

In 2000-2008 - ambassador, Head of the Permanent Representative of Ukraine to the European Union.

In January 2008, Mr. Shpek quitted the government service and became vice-president of Alfa-Bank (Ukraine). In 2010, he became a member of the Committee for Economic Reforms of Ukraine.

On 16 April 2010, he became a member of the NBU Council. In order not to combine work in the NBU Council with operating activities in the commercial bank, he became a senior advisor to JSC Alfa-Bank in October 2010.

In parallel, in 2010 - 2014, he was appointed Advisor to the President of Ukraine.

On 27 January 2014, he became a chairman of the Independent Association of the Banks of Ukraine (IABU).

Since October 2017 he was appointed as the chairman of the supervisory board of PJSC Ukrsotsbank, later - JSC Ukrsotsbank.

The merger of Alfa-Bank and Ukrsotsbank was completed in autumn 2019. Therefore, on 15 October 2019, Roman Shpek joined the supervisory board of Alfa-Bank and became a chairman of the supervisory board of Alfa-Bank Ukraine.

== Honours and awards ==
- 2003, 11 - Order of Merit, 3rd class (Ukraine)
