= Prime Minister of Ukraine =

Head of government

- Прем'єр-міністр України
- Coat of arms of Ukraine

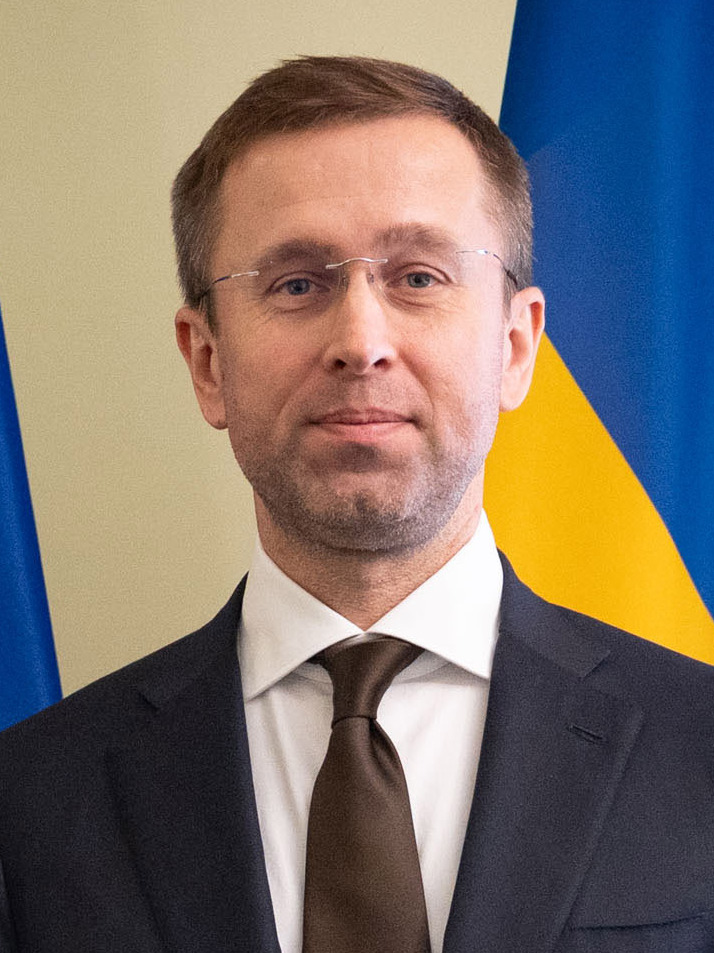
- Incumbent; Serhii Koretskyi since 16 July 2026
- Style: Mr. Prime Minister (informal); His Excellency (diplomatic)
- Type: Head of government
- Member of: Cabinet; National Security and Defense Council
- Seat: Government Building, Kyiv, Ukraine
- Nominator: President of Ukraine
- Appointer: Verkhovna Rada
- Term length: Five years unless the Verkhovna Rada is dissolved sooner No term limits specified
- Inaugural holder: Volodymyr Vynnychenko
- Formation: 28 June 1917; 109 years ago (original); 25 March 1946; 80 years ago (Ukrainian SSR); 24 August 1991; 35 years ago (current form)
- Deputy: First Deputy Prime Minister
- Salary: ₴20,000 monthly
- Website: KMU.gov.ua

The prime minister of Ukraine (Ukrainian: Прем'єр-міністр України, Premier-ministr Ukrainy, pronounced [preˌmjɛrmiˈn⁽ʲ⁾istr ʊkrɐˈjinɪ]) is the head of government of Ukraine. The prime minister presides over the Cabinet of Ministers of Ukraine, which is the highest body of the executive branch of the Ukrainian government. Following the 1991 Declaration of Independence of Ukraine the position replaced the Soviet post of chair of the Council of Ministers of the Ukrainian SSR, which was established on March 25, 1946.

Yulia Tymoshenko was the first woman appointed as the prime minister in the history of Ukraine. Arseniy Yatsenyuk was the first prime minister who came from Western Ukraine. Volodymyr Groysman was the first Jewish Ukrainian prime minister. Two prime ministers were born in the Russian SFSR.

The incumbent prime minister is Serhii Koretskyi, who has been in office since 16 July 2026, accepted by the Verkhovna Rada with 289 votes in favor.

== Appointment ==
The prime minister is appointed by the president with the consent of the Verkhovna Rada. The consent is deemed granted by the parliament when a simple majority of its constitutional membership votes in favour of the candidate nominated by the president. The highest parliamentary approval to date was received by Yulia Tymoshenko who was appointed the prime minister on February 4, 2005, with 373 votes in the Verkhovna Rada. Other prime ministers who received more than 300 votes were Arseniy Yatsenyuk (371), Yatsenyuk again in 2014 (341) Vitold Fokin (332), and Leonid Kuchma (316).

The procedure of granting consent by the parliament is usually preceded by several days of comprehensive consultations and interviews of the candidate by the parliamentary factions. The approval by the legislature is not a mere formality. Some candidates were ratified by a narrow margin and a candidate may be turned down. For instance, in 1999, Valeriy Pustovoitenko fell three votes short of being re-confirmed after he tendered his resignation at the second inauguration of President Leonid Kuchma in 1999. Kuchma chose Viktor Yushchenko as his alternative candidate. Another example is the approval of Yuriy Yekhanurov's candidacy (he fell three votes short of approval, but was confirmed on the second attempt two days later).

After the constitutional amendment of late 2004 and its reinstance in 2014, the president was restricted in their choice of prime minister and was virtually obliged to nominate the person proposed by the parliamentary coalition. The only exception is when the candidate cannot be nominated due to the violation in nomination procedure or the candidate's incompliance with the requirements established by the Constitution and the Ukrainian laws for the prime minister. In this case, the president informs the parliament about the impossibility of submitting a nomination for the proposed candidacy.

The prime minister, as with all members of executive branch, cannot be a member of parliament.

== Duties and powers ==
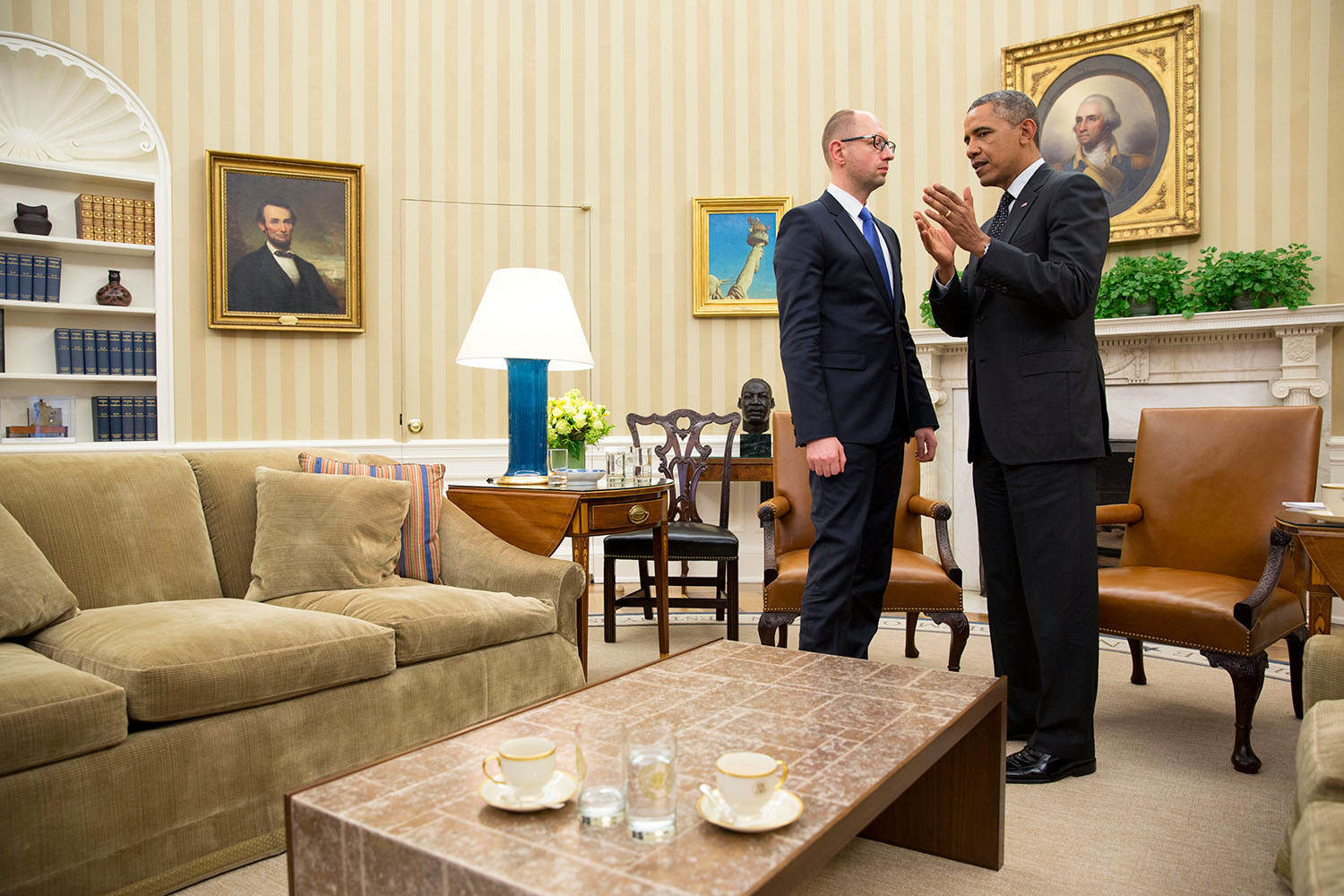
U.S. president Barack Obama talking with Prime Minister Arseniy Yatsenyuk at the conclusion of their bilateral meeting in the Oval Office, March 12, 2014

The prime minister heads Ukraine's executive branch of government, the Cabinet of Ministers, and signs decrees passed by the Cabinet.

The prime minister has the authority to propose candidates for ministry offices to the Verkhovna Rada, with the exception of the minister of foreign affairs and the minister of defence, which are proposed by the president. The prime minister can also propose candidates for the heads of regional administrations to the president for consideration.

The prime minister can also countersign decrees and laws passed by the president. The constitution is silent on the exact regulation of the countersigning. The prime minister (and the respective minister) are responsible for the execution of laws passed by the cabinet.

While in office, the prime minister is granted full legal immunity from all prosecutions and legal proceedings. The prime minister's office is headquartered in the Cabinet of Ministries building in central Kyiv. The prime minister was paid a yearly salary of ₴202,776 (16,898/month) (US$26,770) in 2005. In 2013, following a petition in Fokus magazine, the secretariat of the cabinet stated that the monthly salary of the prime minister was ₴33,980 (US$4,173.42), which is eleven times more than the average salary in the country.

Prime ministers are frequently asked by individual citizens for help in solving their personal problems, sometimes successfully. In 2012, Prime Minister Azarov received dozens of personal pleas every day on his Facebook page.

=== Acting and deputy prime ministers ===
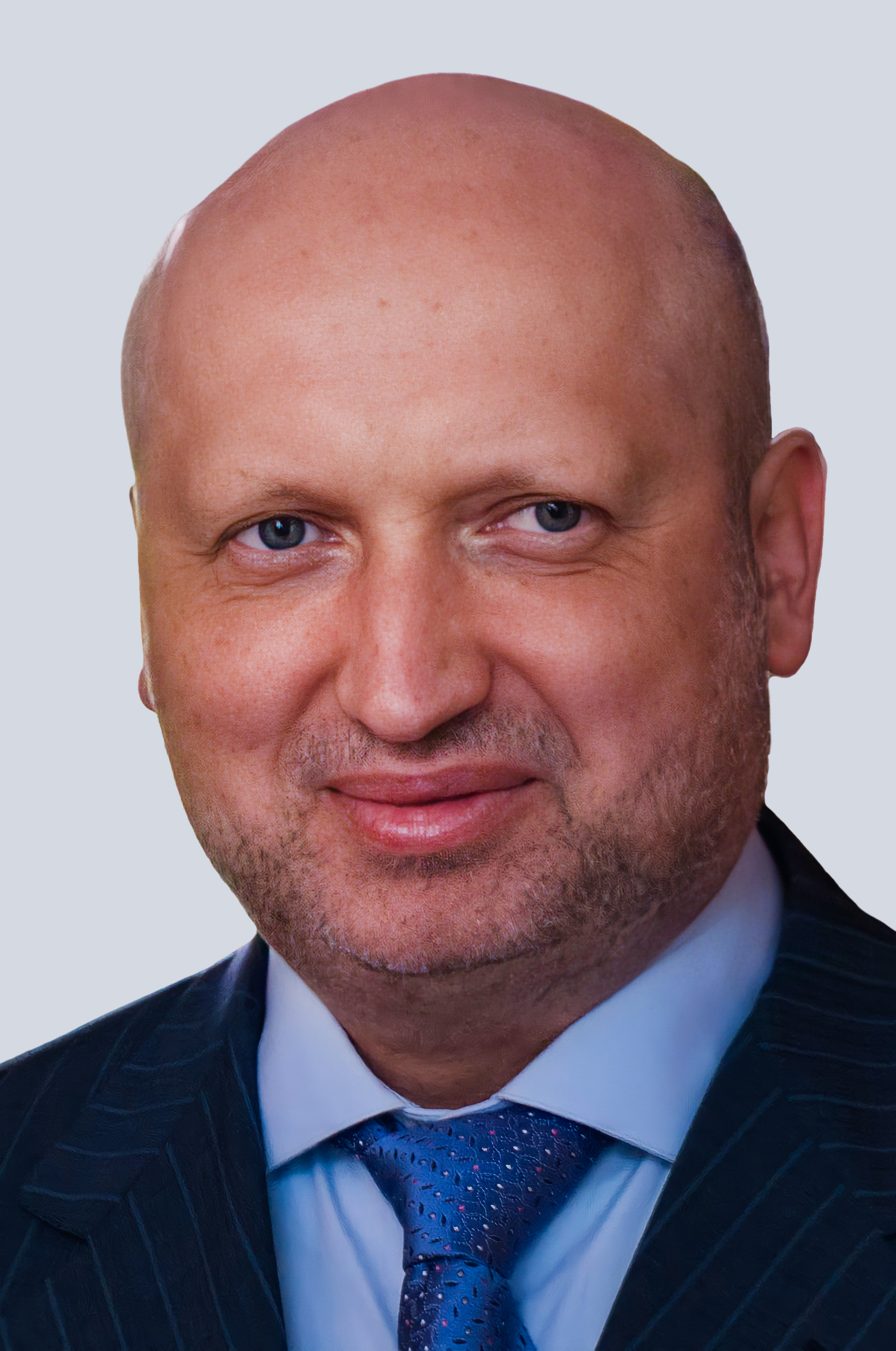
Oleksandr Turchynov served as Acting Prime Minister in 2010 after Yulia Tymoshenko tendered her government's resignation.

The first vice-prime minister, also known as the first deputy, heads the cabinet in the absence of the prime minister due to resignation or dismissal. Among the most notable First deputies were Yukhym Zvyahilsky and Mykola Azarov, who served as the acting prime minister for a longer period of time than anyone else. Valentyn Symonenko, Vasyl Durdynets, Oleksandr Turchynov, and others also served as acting prime minister.

Apart from the first vice-prime minister, there are also several other vice-ministers who support the prime minister and may be in charge of one or more ministries. In 1991–1992 the office of the state minister was also introduced. Traditionally vice-prime ministers are in charge of an area of general state government policy such as the agro-industrial complex, humanitarian affairs, economic affairs, or regional policy. On certain occasions, those deputies may be given regular ministerial portfolios as well, as happened in the Azarov Government in 2010.

== Dismissal and resignation ==
The prime minister, like other Cabinet members, may resign voluntarily by tendering their resignation to parliament (according to the Constitution of Ukraine, the prime minister can only be dismissed by parliamentary vote). Parliament must then consider the matter no later than the 10th day after the resignation application is received, if parliament was not in session at the time of resignation then no later than the first plenary week of the next regular session. A resignation by the prime minister results in the dismissal of the entire Cabinet. After the adoption of the current constitution in 1996, only prime ministers Pavlo Lazarenko and Mykola Azarov have left their post this way. Prime ministers do not have a set term limit, staying in office for the duration of the parliament term, resignation, or dismissal.

Before the constitutional reform of 2004, the prime minister was usually dismissed unilaterally by the president. After the reform, the prime minister can only be dismissed by the parliament. Formally, the Verkhovna Rada needed to pass a resolution of no confidence of the cabinet, which had to result in the prime minister's resignation. However, the parliament could not put such a resolution to the vote within one year of the approval of the cabinet's official programme. The Cabinets of prime ministers Viktor Yushchenko and Viktor Yanukovych were dismissed in this way, with the latter refusing to tender his resignation to the president claiming a violation of the one-year period condition. The cabinet of Yuriy Yekhanurov had also been formally dismissed, but the parliamentary act was subsequently repealed.

== List of prime ministers ==
Since Ukrainian independence from the Soviet Union in 1991, there have been 20 prime ministers.

Serhii Koretskyi is the current prime minister of Ukraine since 16 July 2026.

The longest-serving prime minister is Shmyhal; followed by Mykola Azarov (two terms) and Yulia Tymoshenko (who also served two terms).

Tymoshenko was the first female prime minister of Ukraine.

=== Parliamentary approval ===
#	Date	Prime minister	Origin	Political party	Parliament votes	% (of 450)
1	14 November 1990	Vitold Fokin	Zaporizhzhia Oblast	Independent	332	73.8
2	13 October 1992	Leonid Kuchma	Chernihiv Oblast	Independent	316	70.2
3	16 June 1994	Vitaliy Masol	Chernihiv Oblast	Independent	199	44.2
4	6 March 1995	Yevhen Marchuk	Kirovohrad Oblast	Social Democratic Party of Ukraine	???	???
5	28 May 1996	Pavlo Lazarenko	Dnipropetrovsk Oblast	Hromada	???	???
6	16 July 1997	Valeriy Pustovoitenko	Mykolaiv Oblast	People's Democratic Party	226	50.2
7	22 December 1999	Viktor Yushchenko	Sumy Oblast	Independent	296	65.8
8	29 May 2001	Anatoliy Kinakh	Moldavian SSR	Industrialists	239	53.1
9	21 November 2002	Viktor Yanukovych	Donetsk Oblast	Party of Regions	234	52.0
10	4 February 2005	Yulia Tymoshenko	Dnipropetrovsk Oblast	Batkivshchyna	373	82.9
11	22 September 2005	Yuri Yekhanurov	Russian SFSR	Our Ukraine	289	64.2
12	4 August 2006	Viktor Yanukovych	Donetsk Oblast	Party of Regions	271	60.2
13	18 December 2007	Yulia Tymoshenko	Dnipropetrovsk Oblast	Batkivshchyna	226	50.2
14	11 March 2010	Mykola Azarov	Russian SFSR	Party of Regions	242	53.8
14	13 December 2012	Mykola Azarov	Russian SFSR	Party of Regions	252	56.0
15	27 February 2014	Arseniy Yatsenyuk	Chernivtsi Oblast	Batkivshchyna	371	82.2
15	27 November 2014	Arseniy Yatsenyuk	Chernivtsi Oblast	People's Front	341	75.8
16	14 April 2016	Volodymyr Groysman	Vinnytsia Oblast	Petro Poroshenko Bloc	257	57.1
17	29 August 2019	Oleksiy Honcharuk	Chernihiv Oblast	Servant of the People	290	64.4
18	4 March 2020	Denys Shmyhal	Lviv Oblast	Independent	291	64.7
19	17 July 2025	Yulia Svyrydenko	Chernihiv Oblast	Independent	262	58.2
20	16 July 2026	Serhii Koretskyi	Volyn Oblast	Independent	289	64.2
