= Vitold Fokin =

Prime Minister of Ukraine from 1990 to 1992

- Вітольд Фокін
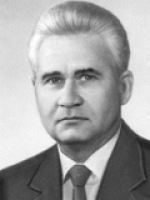
- Official portrait, 1990

1st (Note: As Chairman of the Council of Ministers of the Ukrainian Soviet Socialist Republic until 18 April 1991. Ukraine declared independence from the Soviet Union on 24 August 1991.) Prime Minister of Ukraine
- In office 23 October 1990 – 8 October 1992 (Acting until 14 November 1990)
- President: Leonid Kravchuk
- Preceded by: Vitaliy Masol (Soviet)
- Succeeded by: Valentyn Symonenko (acting)

Member of the Verkhovna Rada
- In office 21 March 1991 – 5 October 1994

Chairman of DerzhPlan
- In office July 1987 – 1990
- Prime Minister: Vitaliy Masol
- Preceded by: Vitaliy Masol
- Succeeded by: Position abolished

Personal details
- Born: 25 October 1932 Novomykolaivka, Dnipropetrovsk Oblast, Ukrainian SSR, Soviet Union
- Died: 20 March 2025 (aged 92) Kyiv, Ukraine
- Party: Independent
- Other political affiliations: CPU (until 1991)
- Spouse: Tomila Fokina (died 2023)
- Children: 2
- Education: National Mining University of Ukraine
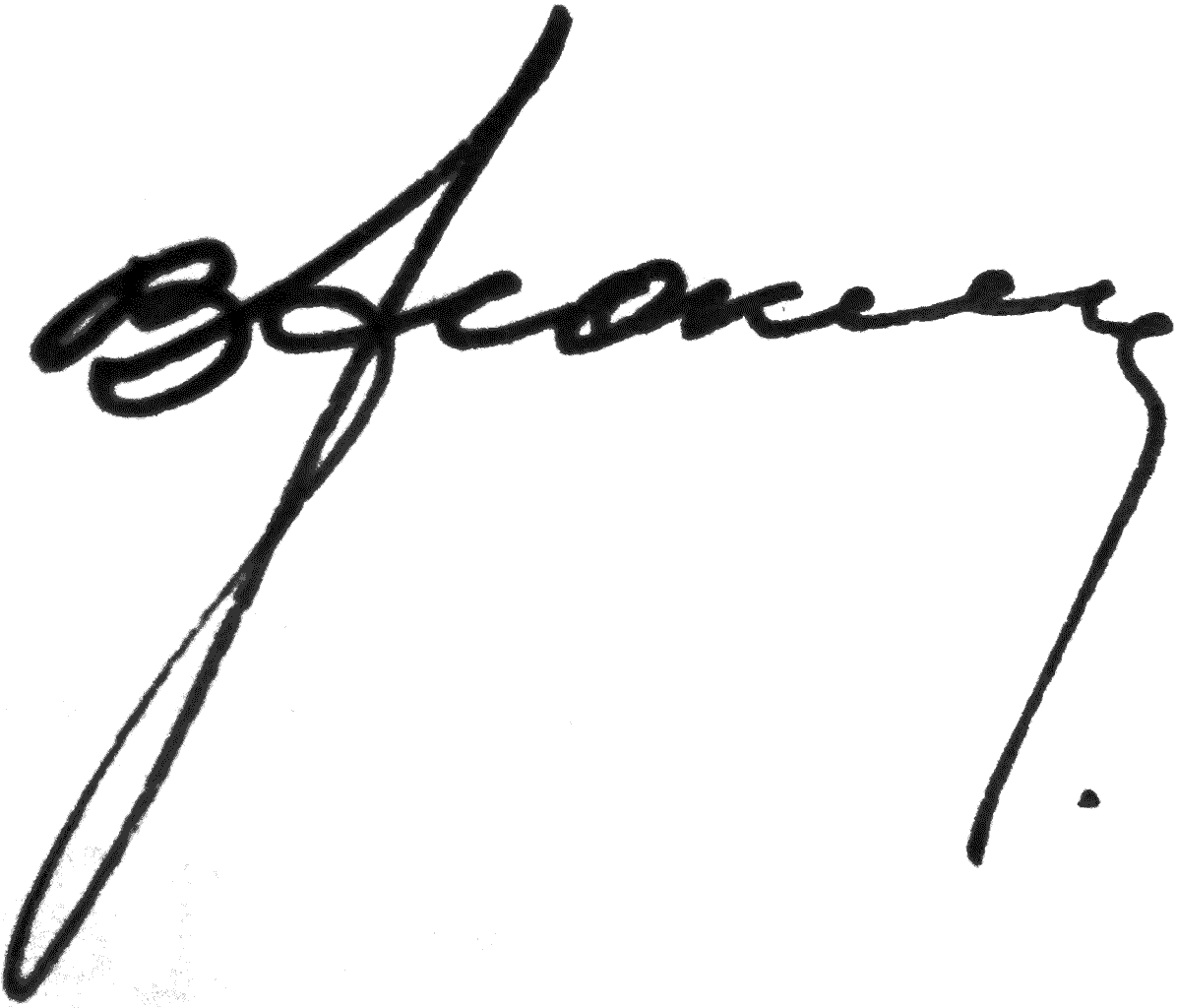
- Signature

Vitold Pavlovych Fokin (Ukrainian: Вітольд Павлович Фокін, Ukrainian pronunciation: [ʋʲiˈtɔlʲd ˈpau̯lowɪt͡ʃ ˈfɔkʲin]; 25 October 1932 – 20 March 2025) was a Ukrainian politician who served as the first Prime Minister of Ukraine from the country's declaration of independence on 24 August 1991 until 8 October 1992. He had earlier served as the prime minister of the Ukrainian Soviet Socialist Republic from 23 October 1990 to 24 August 1991.

After Vitaliy Masol was forced to resign, Fokin was appointed the head of the Council of Ministers of the Ukrainian SSR on 17 October 1990.

== Early life ==
Fokin graduated from the National Mining University of Ukraine in Dnipropetrovsk.

== Prime Minister of Ukraine ==
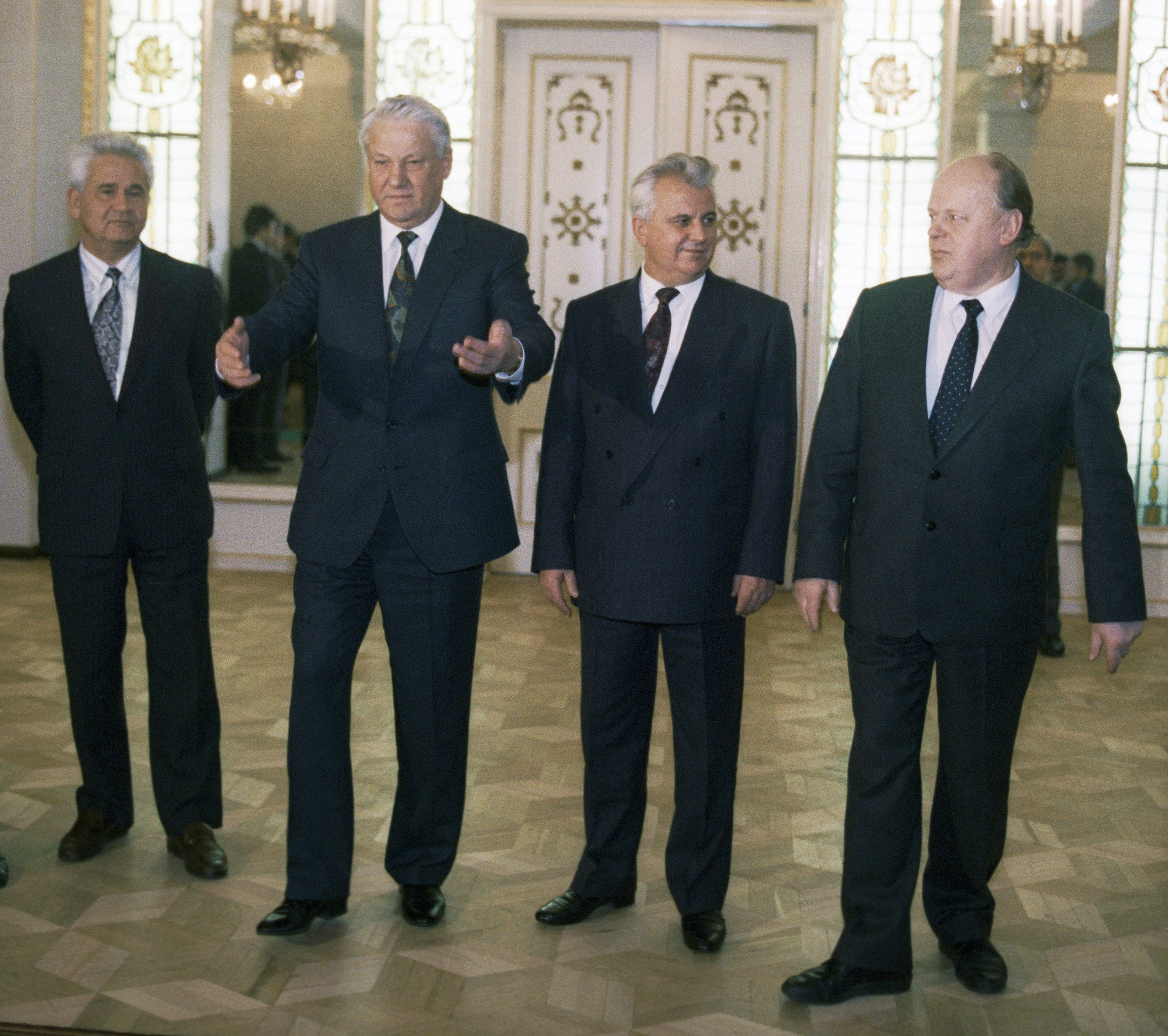
Fokin, with Presidents Leonid Kravchuk, Boris Yeltsin, and Stanislav Shushkevich on 8 December 1991

On 18 April 1991, Fokin was appointed Prime Minister of Ukraine.

On 12 September 1991, the Verkhovna Rada (Ukraine's parliament) adopted its resolution on "Succession of Ukraine" where Ukraine was declared a direct successor of the Ukrainian Soviet Socialist Republic. On 22 August 1992, at a plenary session of the Verkhovna Rada President Leonid Kravchuk accepted a succession diploma from the exiled government of the Ukrainian People's Republic.

Fokin was one of the drafters and signers of the Belavezha Accords that effectively ended the Soviet Union and founded the Commonwealth of Independent States. Before his death, he was the last living signatory.

During his time as prime minister, he avoided radical pro-market reforms, although critics have argued that Fokin's inaction on the matter and excessive subsidies to various unproductive enterprises contributed to hyperinflation (at 1,210% in 1992) and in general to the poor performance of the Ukrainian economy. He resigned on 8 October 1992, under pressure from the Verkhovna Rada and the general public. Until May 1994, he was vice speaker of the Verkhovna Rada. He served as chairman of the supervisory board of AOZT Devon.

== After retirement ==
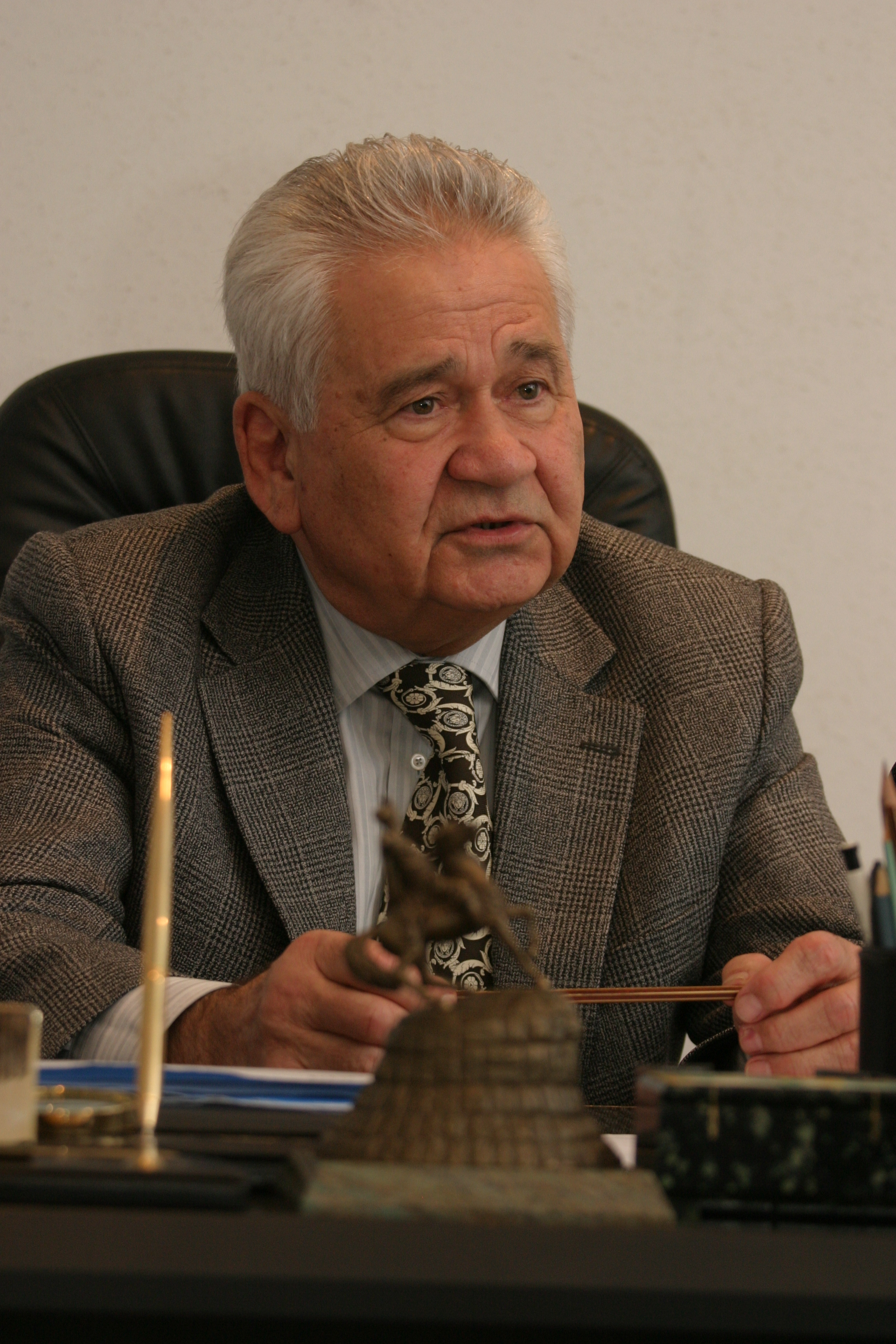
Fokin in 2007

In 2020, the pro-Russian 112 Ukraine TV channel published information about a 2017 interview Fokin gave to Ukrainian journalist Dmitry Gordon, where Fokin attempted to justify the Russian annexation of Crimea following his appointment to the Trilateral Contact Group on Ukraine, a contact group of representatives from Ukraine, Russia, and the Organization for Security and Co-operation in Europe which sought to facilitate a diplomatic resolution of the war in Donbas. On 30 September 2020, Ukrainian president Volodymyr Zelenskyy signed a decree dismissing Fokin from the Trilateral Contact Group because he had not been guided in his "activities and statements by the national interests of Ukraine." Fokin was dismissed a few days after he had claimed that there was "no war between Russia and Ukraine in Donbas".

On 27 March 2022, during the Russian invasion of Ukraine, a Russian missile hit Fokin's house; Fokin himself was not injured because he was in Moldova at the time.

Fokin died in Kyiv on 20 March 2025, at the age of 92.

== Notes ==
Political offices
Preceded by Ivan Samiylenko as Head of government of the Ukrainian People's Republic (in exile)	Prime Minister of the Ukrainian SSR (Ukraine); 1991–1992	Succeeded by Leonid Kuchma
Preceded by himself as Chairman of Council of Ministers of the Ukrainian SSR	Prime Minister of the Ukrainian SSR (Ukraine); 1991–1992	Succeeded by Leonid Kuchma
Preceded by Vitaliy Masol	Chairman of Council of Ministers of the Ukrainian SSR (Ukraine); 1990–1991	Succeeded by himself (as Prime Minister of the Ukrainian SSR)
