= Vitaliy Masol =

Ukrainian statesman (1928–2018)

- Віталій Масол
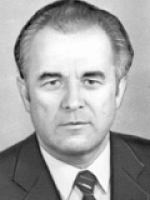
- Official portrait, 1990

3rd Prime Minister of Ukraine
- In office 16 June 1994 – 6 March 1995
- President: Leonid Kravchuk; Leonid Kuchma
- Preceded by: Yukhym Zvyahilsky (acting)
- Succeeded by: Yevhen Marchuk

Chairman of the Council of Ministers of Ukrainian SSR
- In office July 10, 1987 – October 23, 1990
- President: Valentyna Shevchenko; Volodymyr Ivashko (acting); Leonid Kravchuk (acting)
- Preceded by: Oleksandr Liashko
- Succeeded by: Vitold Fokin

Head of DerzhPlan
- In office January 1979 – July 1987
- Prime Minister: Oleksandr Liashko
- Preceded by: Petro Rozenko
- Succeeded by: Vitold Fokin

People's Deputy of Ukraine
- In office May 1990 – May 1994
- In office May 1994 – May 1998

Personal details
- Born: Vitaliy Andriyovych Masol; 14 November 1928 Olyshivka, Kyiv Oblast, Ukrainian SSR, Soviet Union (now Ukraine)
- Died: 21 September 2018 (aged 89) Kyiv, Ukraine
- Party: Communist Party of Ukraine
- Spouse: Nina Masol
- Children: Ihor Masol
- Education: Kyiv Polytechnic Institute
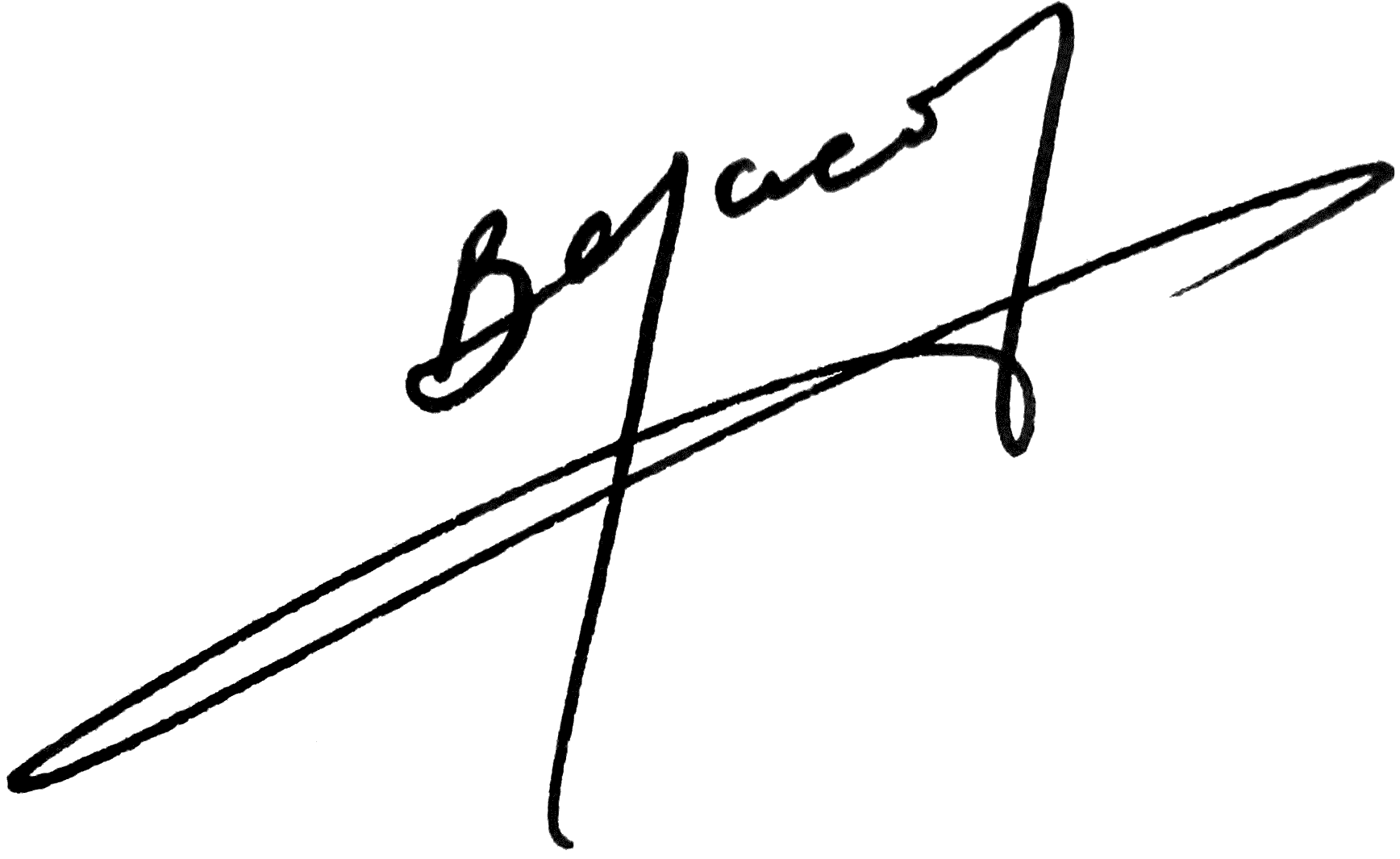
- Signature

Vitaliy Andriyovych Masol (Ukrainian: Віталій Андрійович Масол, Ukrainian pronunciation: [ʋʲiˈtalʲii̯ ɐndˈrʲijowɪt͡ʃ mɐˈsɔl]; 14 November 1928 – 21 September 2018) was a Soviet-Ukrainian politician who served as leader of the Ukrainian government on two occasions. He held various posts in the Ukrainian Soviet Socialist Republic, most notably the Head of the Council of Ministers, which is the equivalent of today's Prime Minister, from 1987 until late 1990, when he was forced to resign. He was later Prime Minister of Ukraine, confirmed in that post on 16 June 1994. He resigned from that post on 1 March 1995.

== Early life and career ==
Vitaliy Andriyovych Masol was born in a village near Chernihiv, Ukrainian Soviet Socialist Republic on 14 November 1928. He graduated in 1951 from Kyiv Polytechnic Institute with a degree in mechanical engineering. He worked as an engineer at the New Kramatorsk Machinebuilding Factory and rose to become the head of the technical department, the head of the mechanical shop and then the deputy chief engineer. In 1971, he was awarded a doctorate in technical science; his thesis was in regards to the fatigue strength of carbon steel used to manufacture ship propellers at the plant.

== Political career ==
=== In the Soviet Union ===
Masol was a member of the Communist Party of Ukraine. In 1972, he became deputy chairman of the state planning committee in Ukraine at the invitation of First Secretary of the Communist Party of Ukraine, Vladimir Shcherbitsky. Shcherbitsky had intended to make him deputy minister for oil but decided that there was a more urgent vacancy on the committee. Masol later became chair of the committee and a member of the commission in charge of decontamination following the Chernobyl disaster. Masol became Deputy Head of the Ukrainian Council of Ministers on 16 January 1979.

He served as Head of the Council of Ministers (equivalent of today's Prime Minister) of the Ukrainian SSR from 1987 until 17 October 1990, when he was forced to resign and was replaced by Vitold Fokin. He was forced into resignation by Ukrainian student protests and hunger strikes known as the Revolution on Granite. Masol was a member of the Congress of People's Deputies of the Soviet Union between 1989 and 1991.

=== In independent Ukraine ===
President Leonid Kravchuk's appointment of Masol as Prime Minister of Ukraine on 16 June 1994 with his image of "an advocate of state-controlled economy" was seen as a surprise and a pre-election concession to the communist-dominated Verkhovna Rada (Ukraine's parliament). Masol was once again reinstated by President Leonid Kuchma. Masol was against most of Kuchma's reform plans and openly so; he sometimes mobilized the Verkhovna Rada against Kuchma. Masol resigned on 1 March 1995, but continued to attend meetings of the Verkhovna Rada. Masol's two periods in this office saw the beginnings of the collapse of the Soviet Union and the establishment of a new political system in Ukraine.

== Awards ==
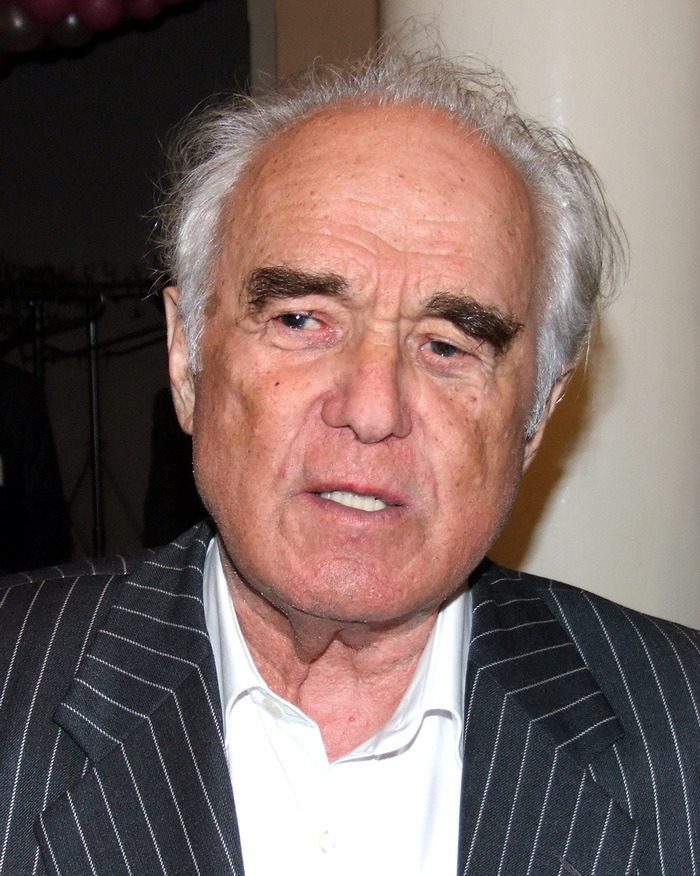
Masol in 2009

During his public service, Vitaliy Masol received numerous civil and state awards and recognition, including the Order of Lenin (in both 1966 and 1986), the Order of the October Revolution (in 1971), the Order of the Red Banner of Labour (in 1978), the Order of the Badge of Honour (in 1960), the Order of Merit 3rd class (in 1997) and 1st Class (in 2008), the Order of Prince Yaroslav the Wise 5th Class (in 1998) and 4th Class (in 2003).

The Kyiv City Council stripped the title of "Honorary Citizen of the City of Kyiv" from Masol on 26 May 2023. It stated it did so in accordance with Ukrainian decommunization laws.

== Death ==
Masol died on September 21, 2018, in Kyiv, at the age of 89. The cause of death was not revealed.

Political offices
Preceded by Oleksandr Liashko	Prime Minister of Ukraine (Ukrainian SSR); 1987–1990	Succeeded by Vitold Fokin
Preceded by Yukhym Zvyahilsky	Prime Minister of Ukraine; 1994–1995	Succeeded by Yevhen Marchuk
