= Lazarenko =

Lazarenko (Ukrainian: Лазаренко) is a surname, derived from the given name Lazarus. Notable people with the surname include:

== People ==
- Angelina Lazarenko (born 1998), Russian volleyball player
- Cliff Lazarenko (born 1952), English darts player
- Ivan Sidorovich Lazarenko (1895–1944), Red Army general and Hero of the Soviet Union
- Olga Lazarenko (born 1980), Russian skier
- Pavlo Lazarenko (born 1953), former prime minister of Ukraine
- Rostyslav Lazarenko (born 1994), Ukrainian military pilot
- Tetiana Lazarenko (born 2003), Ukrainian beach volleyball player
- Viktor Lazarenko (born 1957), Soviet/Ukrainian footballer
- Viktoriia Lazarenko (born 2003), Russian skier
- Vitaly Lazarenko (1890–1939), Russian/Soviet acrobat

== Fictional characters ==
- Lana Lazarenko, alternative name for comic book character Lana Lang

== See also ==
- United States v. Lazarenko, a decision of the United States District Court for the Northern District of California about Pavlo Lazarenko
