= Leonid Kuchma =

President of Ukraine from 1994 to 2005

- Леонід Кучма
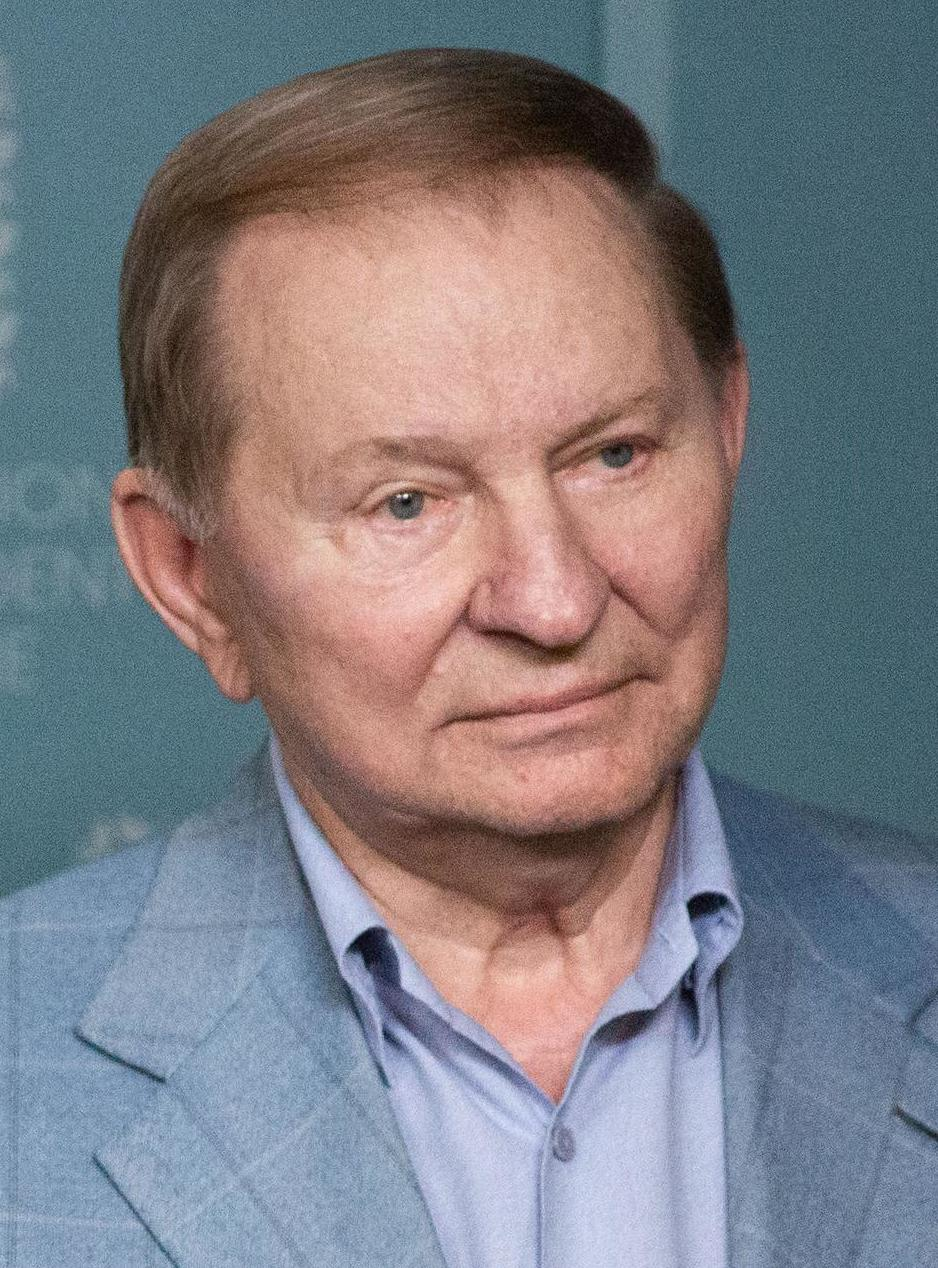
- Kuchma in 2019

2nd President of Ukraine
- In office 19 July 1994 – 23 January 2005
- Prime Minister: Vitaliy Masol; Yevhen Marchuk; Pavlo Lazarenko; Valeriy Pustovoitenko; Viktor Yushchenko; Anatoliy Kinakh; Viktor Yanukovych; Mykola Azarov (acting)
- Preceded by: Leonid Kravchuk
- Succeeded by: Viktor Yushchenko

2nd Prime Minister of Ukraine
- In office 13 October 1992 – 22 September 1993
- President: Leonid Kravchuk
- Preceded by: Vitold Fokin
- Succeeded by: Yukhym Zvyahilsky (acting)

Representative of Ukraine in the Trilateral Contact Group on Ukraine
- In office 3 June 2019 – 28 July 2020
- President: Volodymyr Zelenskyy

General Director of Pivdenmash
- In office November 1986 – 13 October 1992
- Preceded by: Oleksandr Makarov
- Succeeded by: Yuriy Alekseyev

People's Deputy of Ukraine
- In office 15 May 1990 – 15 July 1994
- Constituency: Dnipropetrovsk Oblast, Krasnohvardiiskyi District, Dnipropetrovsk (1990–May 1994); Chernihiv Oblast, No. 448 (May–July 1994)

Personal details
- Born: 9 August 1938 (age 88) Chaikyne, Chernihiv Oblast, Ukrainian SSR, Soviet Union
- Party: Independent (1991–present)
- Other political affiliations: Communist Party of the Soviet Union (1960–1991)
- Spouse: Lyudmila Talalayeva (m. 1962)
- Children: Olena Pinchuk
- Education: Dnipropetrovsk State University (KTN, 1960)
- Leonid Kuchma's voice Kuchma on the formation of a European Neighbourhood Policy Action Plan for Ukraine; Recorded 7 September 2004
- Central institution membership: 1976–1991: Member, Central Committee of the Communist Party of Ukraine; 1986: Delegate, 27th Congress of the Communist Party of the Soviet Union; 1990: Delegate, 28th Congress of the Communist Party of the Soviet Union

Leonid Danylovych Kuchma (Ukrainian: Леонід Данилович Кучма, IPA: [leoˈn⁽ʲ⁾id dɐˈnɪlowɪtʃ ˈkutʃmɐ]; born 9 August 1938) is a Ukrainian politician who served as the second president of Ukraine from 19 July 1994 to 23 January 2005. The only president of Ukraine to serve two terms, his presidency was marked by economic stabilization and an improvement in Russia–Ukraine relations, but at the same time was accompanied by democratic backsliding and growth of the influence of Ukrainian oligarchs, as well as several scandals.

After a successful career as a rocket engineer and businessman in the Soviet Union, Kuchma began his political career in 1990, when he was elected to the Verkhovna Rada (Ukrainian parliament); he was re-elected in 1994. He served as Prime Minister of Ukraine between October 1992 and September 1993. Kuchma took office after winning the 1994 presidential election against his rival, incumbent President Leonid Kravchuk. Kuchma won re-election for an additional five-year term in 1999. Corruption accelerated after Kuchma's election in 1994, but in 2000–2001, his power began to weaken in the face of exposures in the media.

Kuchma's administration began a campaign of media censorship in 1999, leading to arrests of journalists, the death of Georgiy Gongadze, and the subsequent Cassette Scandal and mass protests. The Ukrainian economy continued to decline until 1999, whereas growth was recorded since 2000, bringing relative prosperity to some segments of urban residents. During his presidency, Ukrainian-Russian ties began to improve. Kuchma declined to seek a third term in office, instead supporting Party of Regions candidate Viktor Yanukovych for the 2004 election. Following public protests over the alleged electoral fraud which escalated into the Orange Revolution, Kuchma took a neutral stance and was a mediator between Viktor Yushchenko and Viktor Yanukovych. Between 2014 and 2020, Kuchma was a special presidential representative of Ukraine at the quasi peace talks regarding the war in Donbas.

Kuchma's legacy has proven controversial, and he has been described as authoritarian by various sources. Widespread corruption and media censorship under Kuchma's administration continue to have an impact on Ukraine today, and he has been accused of promoting oligarchism.

== Early life and family ==
Leonid Danylovych Kuchma was born in the village of Chaikyne in rural Chernihiv Oblast on 9 August 1938 to Danylo Prokopovych and Paraskoviia Trokhymivna Kuchma. The origins of Kuchma's family are unclear, though his surname is most common in the western Lviv Oblast, and after his election as president various parts of Ukraine claimed to have been the original location of his family. One myth from Drohobych claimed that an individual named Danylo Kuchma left the town for Dnieper Ukraine in 1927, while western Ukraine was ruled by Poland and Ukrainisation policies were in effect in the Ukrainian SSR. Biographer Kost Bondarenko has cast doubt on these stories, saying that they are likely common in various regions of Ukraine as a result of Kuchma's unclear lineage. Kuchma was born into a family of peasants and is the youngest of three children. Both of his older siblings worked as coal miners. Kuchma's early life was shaped by the confluence of Ukrainian, Belarusian and Russian culture in northern Chernihiv Oblast; the mixed Russian–Ukrainian Surzhyk dialect was the most frequently used language in the region.

Danylo Kuchma was an ideological communist who joined the Communist Party of the Soviet Union in the 1930s. He was mobilised into the Red Army shortly after Operation Barbarossa, and fought in the 229th Rifle Division. He died at a field hospital in the village of Novoselitsy, Novgorod Oblast in 1944, and his remains were identified in 1997. Leonid lived with his mother during the Nazi German occupation, and after Chaikyne was destroyed by the Germans in a Bandenbekämpfung retaliatory attack against Soviet partisans in nearby Bryansk, they fled to neighbouring Karasi, where Paraskoviia's sister was working as a teacher. Karasi was later subjected to aerial bombardment and artillery attacks amidst the German retreat, again displacing the Kuchma family, this time into the forests. After the war's end, the Kuchma family moved onto a kolkhoz, where they lived in a hut with an area of 10 square metres (110 ft^{2}). The remainder of Kuchma's childhood was dominated by destitute poverty, particularly during the Soviet famine of 1946–1947, which significantly affected eastern Ukraine.

Kuchma joined the CPSU in 1960, graduating from Dnipropetrovsk State University (now the Oles Honchar Dnipro National University) with a degree in engineering physics the same year. As one of the first students at the university studying physics (a position of increased importance as a result of the nuclear arms race during the Cold War), Kuchma came under the patronage of Leonid Brezhnev, then First Secretary of the Dnipropetrovsk Regional Committee of the Communist Party of Ukraine, and the defence industry Kuchma sought employment in was a crucial part of Brezhnev's Dnipropetrovsk Mafia patronage network. (Note: Commonly referred to as a 'clan'.) Kuchma holds a Candidate of Engineering Sciences degree, and was a professor at Dnipropetrovsk State University after his graduation. The topic of his thesis remains classified as of 2007, though Bondarenko has posited that it may have been about missile launch facilities for the R-36 missile under development at the time Kuchma would have written his thesis. An apocryphal claim states that early in his career Kuchma was nicknamed chekushka for his short stature and alcoholism; biographer Gennady Korzh has disputed this, noting that documents from the KGB, which continually monitored Kuchma due to his career in the rocket industry, never alluded to such a thing.

=== Engineering and business career ===
After graduation, Kuchma worked in the field of aerospace engineering for the Dnipropetrovsk-based Pivdenne Design Bureau, which designed missiles and space rockets for the Soviet Union. At the age of 28 he served as testing director at the Baikonur cosmodrome in Kazakhstan, and he was later secretary of the Communist Party committee at Pivdenne. As one of the designers of the R-36 missile, Kuchma was awarded the Lenin Prize. Kuchma also worked in the Soviet space programme under Sergei Korolev for some months in 1961, amidst the Space Race, before returning to Pivdenne to work as a rocket designer.

Kuchma became the director of rocket manufacturer Pivdenmash in 1986, succeeding Oleksandr Makarov. He had previously served as head of the party committee at the company from 1976 to 1982. Pivdenmash was the Soviet Union's main manufacturer for intercontinental ballistic missiles, as well as the main supplier for the country's space programme. By the time he resigned as the company's director in 1992, Kuchma had become a red director and a member of the nomenklatura "par excellence", according to human rights activist Adrian Karatnycky.

== Early political career ==
Kuchma was serving as head of a committee of Komsomol members at Pivdenne in 1961 when he was appointed head of the Komsomol in Dnipropetrovsk's Industrialnyi District. That summer, he was sent to a kolkhoz to organise weed control efforts (as was a popular summer activity in the Komsomol). Most of those working under Kuchma were young women.

While working on the kolkhoz, Kuchma fell in love with the Russian-born Lyudmila Talalayeva, and presented her with a bouquet on 19 June 1961. The two married the next year. Talalayeva was the adopted daughter of Gennady Tumanov, chief of technology at Pivdenmash and later a low-level minister. The Ukrainian Independent Information Agency posited in 2007 that Kuchma's marriage into Tumanov's family benefited his career. Bondarenko argues against such allegations, citing individuals close to Kuchma as saying that Tumanov was a Stalinist who disliked nepotism.

Kuchma was elected to the Central Committee of the Communist Party of Ukraine in 1976, the same year that he became head of the Communist Party committee at Pivdenmash. He was a delegate to the 27th and 28th Congresses of the CPSU.

By 1989, Ukraine was in the midst of a popular revolution against the Soviets. Though it was centred around Lviv in the west, the revolution's supporters were increasingly travelling throughout Ukraine spreading rhetoric against Soviet rule, which the Ukrainian Soviet government failed to provide a popular alternative to. With the survival of communism in question, Kuchma was faced with a choice between further integrating himself into Ukrainian political structures or leaving Ukraine for Russia to continue his business career. He ultimately decided to fully enter politics, and in December 1989 declared his intention to run for the Supreme Soviet of the Ukrainian SSR at the 1990 election.

Kuchma was elected to the Supreme Soviet in 1990, representing Dnipropetrovsk's Krasnohvardiiskyi District (now Chechelivskyi District). At the time, he described himself as an ethnic Russian. During the 1991 Soviet coup attempt Kuchma was in Dnipropetrovsk; according to Bondarenko, while he did not actively back the putschist State Committee on the State of Emergency, he was prepared to support the committee as the new Soviet government. After the failure of the coup attempt, Kuchma voted in favour of the Declaration of Independence of Ukraine, saying of the coup, "We snuck by this time, but why should the fate of Ukraine further depend on events occurring beyond her borders?" (Note: Russian: На этот раз пронесло, но почему судьба Украины и дальше должна зависеть от событий, происходящих за ее пределами?) He endorsed Ihor Yukhnovskyi in the 1991 Ukrainian presidential election; the election was won by Leonid Kravchuk, the chairman of the Supreme Soviet.

== Premiership ==
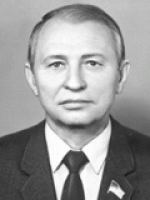
Official portrait as a People's Deputy of Ukraine, 1990

Ukraine's independence and the dissolution of the Soviet Union, unlike in the cases of the formerly Soviet-aligned states of Central Europe, presented the challenge of building previously nonexistent state and economic institutions. Kravchuk, as well as Vitold Fokin, the prime minister of Ukraine appointed after the 1990 election, were faced with hyperinflation, economic collapse and the growth of organised crime. Kravchuk's efforts to build a centralised state were rejected by a coalition of industrialists and pre-independence regional elites. As a result of the power struggle, Fokin was forced to resign, and the group of business and local bosses pushed Kravchuk to appoint Kuchma in his place. Two other individuals (Valentyn Symonenko of Odesa and Azovstal Iron and Steel Works director Oleksandr Bulianda) were publicly floated for the position, but after Zaporizhstal director Vitaliy Satskyi publicly expressed his desire for Kuchma to become prime minister, he was confirmed by the Verkhovna Rada (the parliament and successor to the Supreme Soviet) on 13 October 1992.

Kuchma's government included five anti-communist national democrats: Yukhnovskyi, Oleksandr Yemets, Viktor Pynzenyk, Taras Stetskiv and Mykola Zhulynskyi. Besides the inclusion of individuals from the anti-government Democratic Bloc, the government included several members of the Dnipropetrovsk Mafia, as well as other business figures from the Donbas. Seventeen members of the new government maintained their positions from the Fokin government.

Kuchma alleged that Ukraine's economic dependence on Russia, the absence of sovereign credit resources provided by the Ukrainian government and a lack of developmental aid were among the sources of the economic crisis, statements that were publicly perceived as attacks on Kravchuk's presidency. While Kuchma initially proposed to reassert state control over the economy and maintain the Fokin government's system of bailouts for state-owned enterprises, his position changed at first to restructuring of state enterprises into joint-stock companies with the government as the controlling shareholder before he embraced privatisation in January 1993. Kuchma proposed to reduce deficit spending from 35% of Ukraine's gross domestic product to 5–6%, reduce monthly inflation to 2–3%, implement privatisation and progressive taxes, abolish state monopolies and reduce export restrictions.

Kuchma's premiership oversaw Ukraine's abandonment of the Soviet ruble as currency and the introduction of the karbovanets as the temporary legal tender, preceding a drop in hyperinflation that would allow for the adoption of the hryvnia. On 18 November 1992, Kuchma's government was provided by the Rada with the right to rule by decree to undertake economic reforms and combat corruption. In addition to these decrees, which were permitted within a six-month period until 18 May 1993, Kuchma was granted the right to change any established laws and propose new legislation to the Rada. The only limit placed upon the decrees was that they could be revoked by the Rada within ten days of their enactment. Among the decrees passed by Kuchma's government, welfare spending was reduced, the state monopoly on trade was abolished and debt monetisation was banned.

Kuchma's reforms were staunchly opposed by the Rada, which was largely made up of ex-communists and blocked his economic policies, as well as the Donetsk Clan patronage network. Other problems faced by Kuchma in pushing through reforms included the opposition of some members of the cabinet (chiefly deputy prime minister and minister of the agro-industrial complex Volodymyr Demianov) to the measures and the continued autonomy of both the National Bank of Ukraine and the State Property Fund, therefore leaving monetary and credit policy outside of the government's control. Karatnycky has cast doubt on the seriousness of the programme, noting that, "In reality, privatization lagged far behind the shiny reformist rhetoric," and that the Ukrainian state failed to prevent (and at times even assisted in) widespread corruption in the privatisation process, resulting in the further enrichment of elites.

As a result of declining economic situation, in June 1993 a wave of miners' strikes started in the Donbas, with their participants demanding higher wages and pensions. The Rada, prescient of the previous wave of strikes in 1989 that had been a key part of the revolution, soon voted to accept their demands. In response to the strikes and increased political unrest, snap parliamentary and presidential elections were scheduled for March and June 1994, respectively. Kuchma resigned from office on 22 September 1993, blaming Kravchuk for the inability to achieve economic reforms. Subsequently, Kravchuk placed the responsibilities of the cabinet and the prime minister under the presidency, while appointing Yukhym Zvyahilsky of the Donetsk Clan as acting prime minister. Yurchenko argues that the 1993–1994 political crisis was a struggle between factions of the elites, claiming that Donetsk Clan sought to utilise the strikes to criticise Kuchma's economic policies, strengthen their political and economic power and obtain autonomy for the Donbas from the Ukrainian government.

== 1994 elections ==
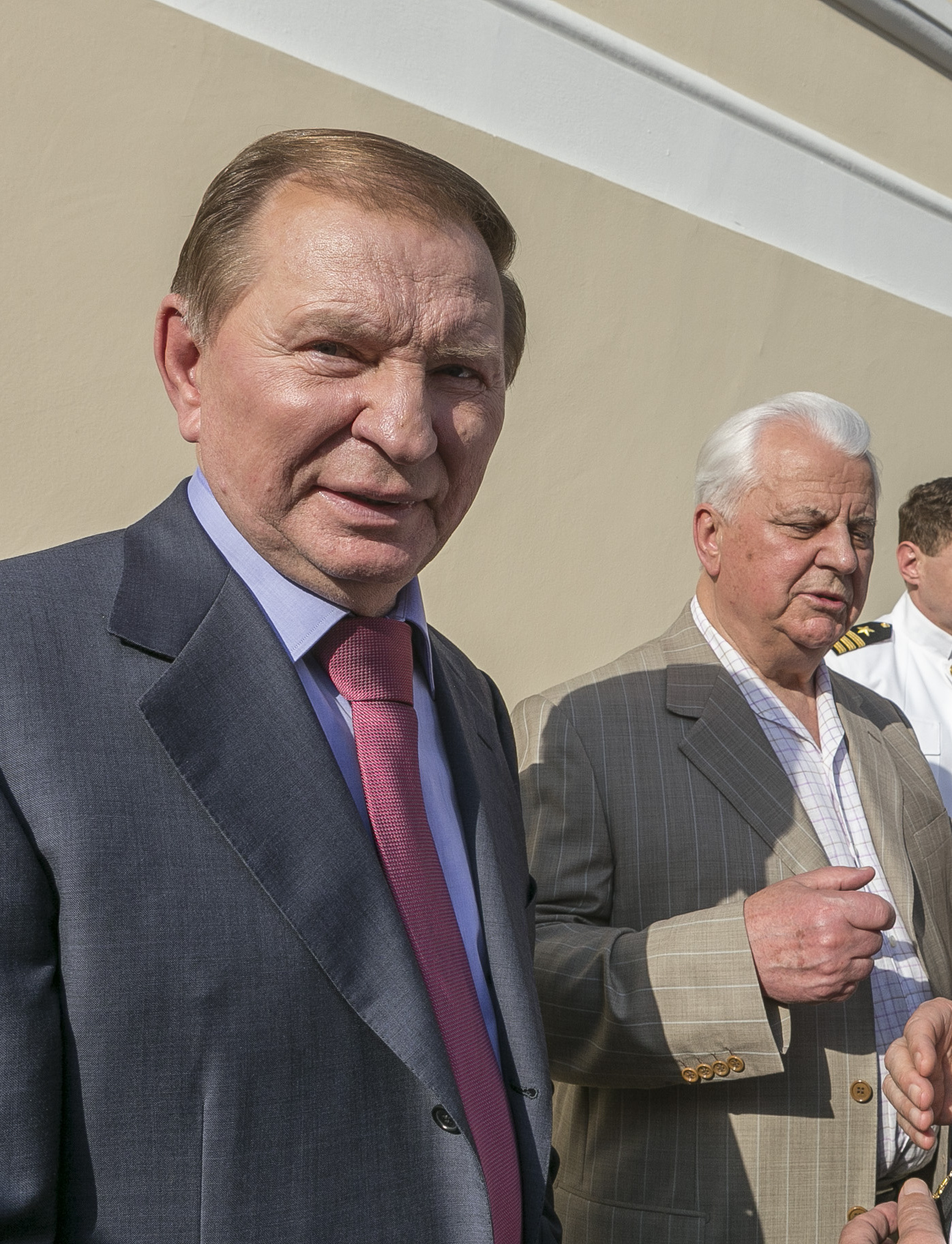
Kuchma with Leonid Kravchuk in 2014. Kravchuk was Kuchma's predecessor as president and rival in the 1994 Ukrainian presidential election.

Following Kuchma's resignation, he was re-elected at the 1994 Ukrainian parliamentary election, this time representing the 448th district in Chernihiv Oblast. Kuchma, who won his constituency with 91% of the vote, was one of a number of individuals elected to the Rada described as "possible rivals" to Kravchuk by Steven Erlanger of The New York Times, alongside reformist economists Pynzenyk and Volodymyr Lanovyi, leader of the national-democratic Rukh party Viacheslav Chornovil, and chairman of the Rada Ivan Plyushch. In contrast to expectations of low turnout, 75% of Ukrainians voted in the parliamentary election Kuchma also became leader of the Ukrainian Union of Industrialists and Entrepreneurs, a lobbying group for business interests linked to the red directors. The Union of Industrialists and Entrepreneurs would later provide financial backing for Kuchma's 1994 presidential campaign.

Kuchma's main ally, both in the Rada and his presidential campaign, was leader of the liberal New Ukraine party Volodymyr Hrynyov. Alongside Hrynyov, Kuchma founded the Inter-Regional Bloc of Reforms (Ukrainian: Міжрегіональний блок реформ, romanized: Mizhrehionalnyi blok reform, abbreviated MRBR) in December 1993, and the two served as co-chairmen of the party. The MRBR was cautious of the national democrats such as Rukh, with Kuchma describing the national democrats pejoratively as "national chauvinists". Likewise, the national democrats were suspicious of both Hrynyov and Kuchma's sympathies for the Commonwealth of Independent States, the Russian language in Ukraine and economic reintegration with Russia; Kuchma's statement that "Ukraine cannot live without Russia" caused further controversy on the right. Despite these differences, the MRBR and Rukh were forced into negotiations for a political alliance after the parliamentary election as a result of the victory of the reconstituted Communist Party of Ukraine (Ukrainian: Комуністична партія України, romanized: Komunistychna partiia Ukrainy, abbreviated KPU) and their mutual antipathy towards Kravchuk.

By the time of his victory in the parliamentary election, Kuchma had already announced his intention to challenge Kravchuk in a snap presidential election to be held later that year. A few days after his parliamentary victory, Kuchma was visited at his home in Dnipropetrovsk by a delegation of leading business and industry figures from southern and eastern Ukraine. Kuchma later recounted the meeting as such to Bondarenko:

"They were directors of the largest enterprises of Dnipropetrovsk, Kharkiv, Donetsk, my friends from Pivdenmash. The team was led by the director general of Motor Sich, Vyacheslav Bohuslayev. The conversation was turned to business straight away. 'The election result is good but could be better. We mean "larger". We are confident that you shall ballot for presidency.'"

Kuchma claims to Bondarenko that he initially expressed incredulity to Bohuslayev about being selected as a presidential candidate. He also referred to the circumstances of his election in 1994 as "by accident" in 2002. Yurchenko argues that this endorsement by political and economic bosses in southern and eastern Ukraine enabled Kuchma's election to the presidency.

Results of the second round of the 1994 Ukrainian presidential election. Kuchma's best results were in southern and eastern Ukraine, while Kravchuk was dominant in western Ukraine.

The presidential election was primarily based around language and ethnicity, with Kravchuk taking a more nationalist position than he had in 1991. All but one candidate (Oleksandr Moroz of the Socialist Party of Ukraine) out of seven contesting the 1994 election was an independent. Kravchuk sought to cast Kuchma as a Russophile, baselessly claiming that he was anti-Ukrainian, sought to surrender the Black Sea Fleet and Crimea to Russia, and endeavoured to restore the Soviet Union. In Western media, Kuchma was frequently compared to Alexander Lukashenko, the pro-Russian president of Belarus who had been elected earlier that year. Kuchma rejected accusations of Russophilia, arguing that he favoured balanced relations with both Russia and the West; in the spring of 1994, he travelled to Washington, D.C. along with campaign officials Oleksandr Volkov, Dmytro Tabachnyk and Oleksandr Tkachenko to demonstrate a pro-Western position, meeting with American diplomats Zbigniew Brzezinski and Jeane Kirkpatrick and members of the non-governmental organisation Freedom House. Kuchma's supporters emphasised his business and managerial credentials as former director of Pivdenmash, as well as his support for strong presidential power. In contrast to Kravchuk's backing from Ukrainian state media (including radio, television and Holos Ukrayiny, the government gazette), pro-Kuchma messaging was often broadcast on Russian state television channel ORT, which had a larger viewership. Kuchma also received financial support from Seabeco and Nordex, two companies tied to Boris Birshtein (a business partner of Sergei Mikhailov, leader of the Solntsevskaya Bratva). Wilson states that both Seabeco and Nordex faced allegations of organised crime ties and involvement in arms trafficking, particularly to Iran and North Korea.

Kuchma placed second in the first round of the election, with 31.3% to Kravchuk's 37.7%. In the second round, however, he defeated Kravchuk in an upset, with 52.1% to Kravchuk's 45.1%. While he was not formally endorsed by the KPU (which, like Rukh, declined to endorse a candidate), Kuchma's support largely came from its members, as well as residents of southern and eastern Ukraine. Conversely, Kravchuk found himself supported largely by Ukrainian speakers and those from western Ukraine, a reversal of the 1991 election.

== First presidential term (1994–1999) ==
Kuchma was inaugurated as the second president of Ukraine on 19 July 1994, taking the oath of office on the 16th-century Peresopnytsia Gospel. Kuchma's inauguration marked a peaceful transition and rotation of power, establishing a precedent that has since governed Ukraine. In an inaugural address described as "controversial" by political scientist Andrew Wilson, Kuchma advocated Eurasianism, accusing Kravchuk of a policy of isolationism and describing Ukraine as economically and socially part of Eurasia. Members of the Communist Party cheered and applauded during the speech, while right-wing deputies left the Verkhovna Rada building in protest, also unsuccessfully attempting to drown out Kuchma's address with chants of "Shame!" (Note: Ukrainian: ганьба!) Kuchma further argued for economic liberalisation and pledged to pass a law establishing Russian as the co-official language of Ukraine. After the ceremony, Kuchma walked from the Verkhovna Rada building to Mariinskyi Palace, where Kravchuk formally invested him with presidential powers.

=== Domestic policy ===
==== Economic reforms ====
Real annual GDP growth of Ukraine, 1990–2011. GDP contractions continued, but lessened during Kuchma's first term, eventually leading to GDP growth in his second.

Kuchma's 1994 presidential campaign had primarily focused on economic reform, and following his victory he began pursuing a programme of economic liberalisation intended to resolve Ukraine's protracted economic crisis as his chief priority. Immediately after Kuchma's election as president, minister of economy Roman Shpek was given the responsibility for reforming the economy in line with the recommendations of foreign advisers, such as the Soros Foundation, USAID, the European Union's TACIS programme and the International Monetary Fund, as well as members of the Ukrainian diaspora. Kuchma initially advocated for a "socially oriented market economy" as a middle road between liberalisation and maintaining the Soviet economic system, as well as gradual market reform in place of shock therapy, but it soon became apparent that avoiding liberalisation was impossible.

After removing Kravchuk-appointed prime minister Vitaliy Masol and appointing Yevhen Marchuk as his successor in March 1995, Kuchma and Marchuk agreed to appoint the liberal economist Viktor Pynzenyk as first deputy prime minister. Alongside National Bank of Ukraine head Viktor Yushchenko, Pynzenyk oversaw a 1996 monetary reform that led to the replacement of the karbovanets with the hryvnia as Ukraine's currency, as well as the introduction of budgetary discipline measures that Karatnycky credits with reducing hyperinflation and budget deficits. The NBU's December 1993 pause on credit issuances also assisted in the reduction of hyperinflation and economic stabilisation.

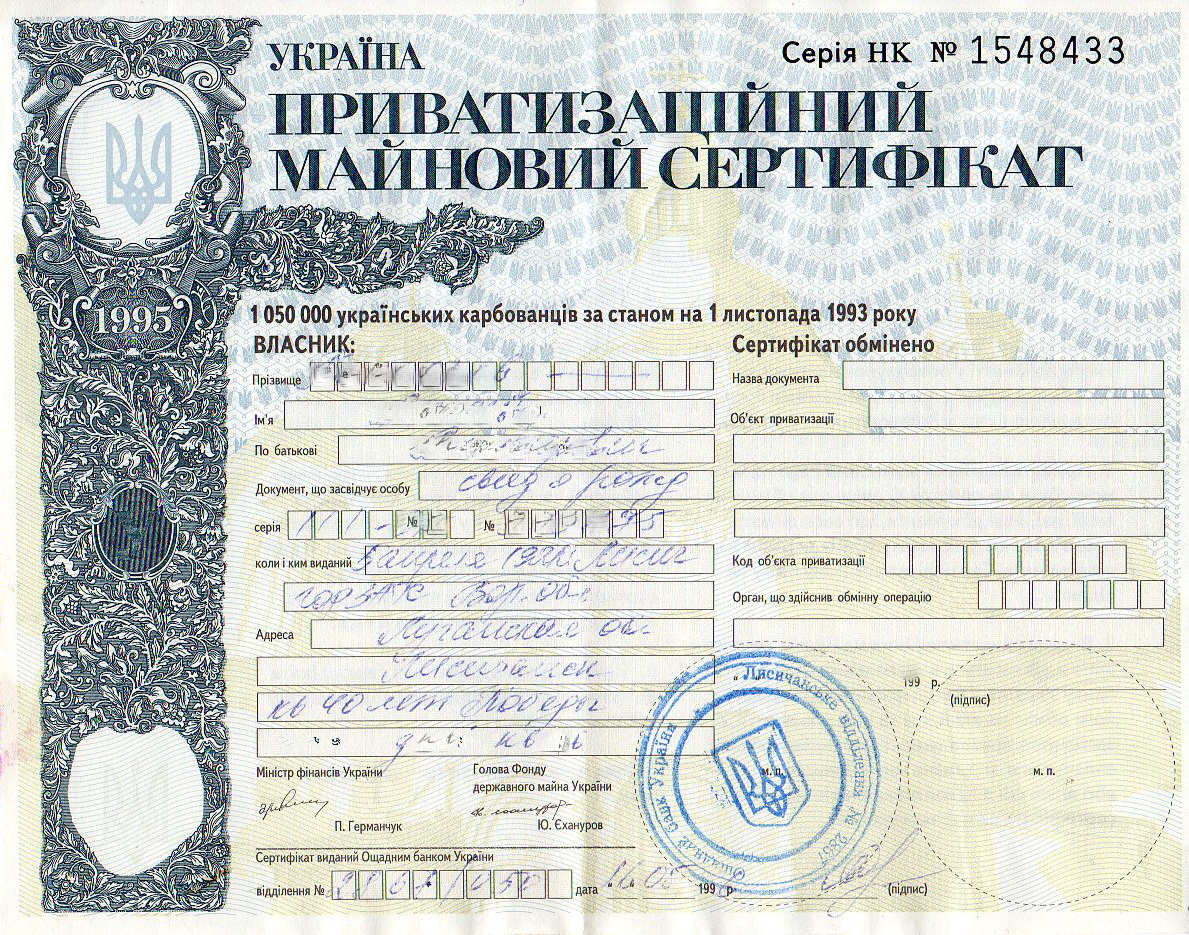
A privatisation voucher issued in 1995

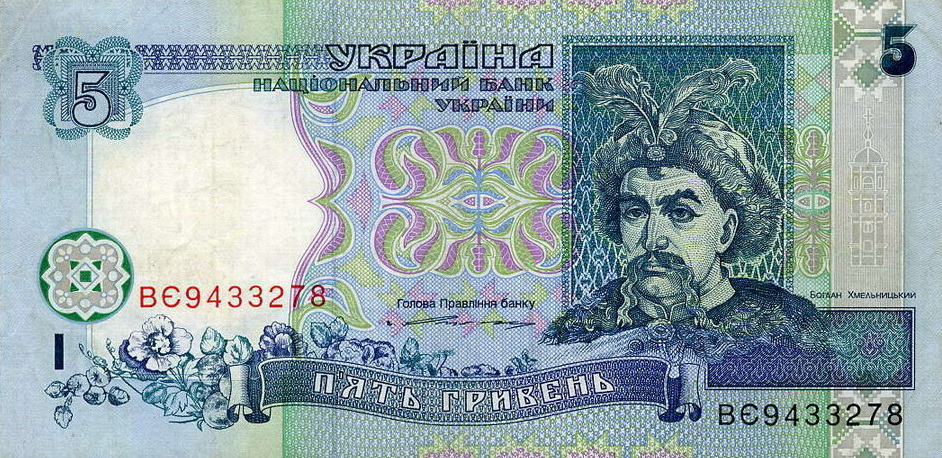
A five-hryvnia banknote introduced in 1996

Price liberalisation during Kuchma's first months as president helped to reduce shortages and reinvigorated the agricultural sector. The abolition of subsidies on gas imports from Russia further reduced the budget deficit. Through a presidential decree, Kuchma also reduced the maximum personal income tax from 90% to 50%. In 1994–1995 the Rada adopted a new Law on Taxation and reduced the value-added tax rate. By March 1995 the financial stabilisation allowed the Ministry of Finance to issue treasury bills.

In 1995 privatisation vouchers were distributed through Oschadbank, Ukraine's state savings bank, to 28.5 million people (55% of the population). These certificates could either be used by citizens themselves in privatisation auctions, or transferred to a state-licensed investment fund. Sale of vouchers was not allowed. The privatisation policy was managed by Yuriy Yekhanurov, head of the State Property Fund. The Rada, dominated by the KPU, attempted to block privatisation efforts and issued a list of up to 6,000 enterprises excluded from being privatized. The privatisation of smaller enterprises had been largely completed by 1996, but many large-scale and medium enterprises were either appropriated by their managers through insider privatisation at minimum cost, or remained state property. Voucher privatisation was officially ended in mid-1997 and replaced by cash privatisation through outside investors. By that time the share of Ukraine's GDP originating from private sector had risen to 55%, further increasing to 65% after 2002, although some estimates offered the number of 80%.

According to Wilson, the prime opponent of economic reforms were the clans, who sought to maintain their economic interests; Kuchma blamed the leftist majority in the Rada for blocking reforms, though Wilson criticises this position by noting that Kuchma was given full power to pursue reforms under the 1996 constitution. Yurchenko argues that reforms proceeded through privatisation after the passage of the 1996 constitution, and that his control over the State Property Fund enabled the capture of state-owned enterprises by Kuchma's allies and the growth of a new capitalist class. Conversely, Paul D'Anieri, Kuzio and Robert Kravchuk state that Ukraine did not pursue economic reforms to a significant extent under Kuchma's first term, placing importance on institutional continuity rather than shock therapy.

==== Corruption and organised crime ====
Both as prime minister and during his presidential campaign, Kuchma had vowed to combat the increasingly powerful Ukrainian mafia. Kuzio argues that of all the candidates in the 1994 presidential election he took the strongest position against corruption, adopting populist messaging that economic reforms proposed by Kravchuk were cover for the "utter plundering" of Ukraine. By 1994, 40% of Ukraine's economy was derived from profits made in the black market. Presidential adviser Oleksandr Razumkov noted in spring 1996 that the proliferation of the black market had enabled the mafia to assert control over a large number of businesses, including Ukraine's many state-owned enterprises. In 1995, Kuchma's government briefly considered passing economic reforms to formalise the black market with a handful of exceptions, such as the drug trade.

Kuchma's presidency was marked from its outset by increased corruption and patronage. According to Wilson, "Kuchma soon gained notoriety for showering appointments and favours on his home region of Dnipropetrovsk". The role of Birshtein's business interests during Kuchma's campaign presaged the further expansion of the mafia during his first term, including increased involvement in organised crime by state officials who used . Academic Hans van Zon classifies the Ukrainian government under Kuchma's rule as neopatrimonial, noting the increasing subordination of formal governmental structures such as the Rada to the Presidential Administration and the clans. Informal agreements regarding state appointments, such as a 1994 deal between the Dnipropetrovsk Mafia and the Kyiv Seven, enabled further expansion of presidential powers through patronage networks. Another deal with the Donetsk Clan led to Volodymyr Shcherban's appointment as governor of Donetsk Oblast in July 1995; the deal proved short-lived, as Shcherban's desire to obtain local control over the coal industry led to his removal and replacement by Viktor Yanukovych in May 1997.

Kuchma's first presidential term was marked by the emergence of the Ukrainian oligarchs. Kuchma has been accused of complicity in oligarchisation by various sources, such as van Zon, who says that the privatisation process being engineered to balance clan interests furthered state capture, and political scientist Rosaria Puglisi, who states that the promotion of the Dnipropetrovsk Mafia's members to high-ranking positions directly led to the crystallisation of a financial and political elite with control over state resources. Puglisi further defines Ukraine's economic system under Kuchma as rent-seeking, relying on personal contacts with the Presidential Administration in order to obtain financial advancement through exemptions from state regulation. Bondarenko argues that Kuchma encouraged the development of an oligarchic system in order to ensure state stability and consolidation while preventing the emergence of a single dominant figure.

On 28 May 1996, Kuchma appointed Pavlo Lazarenko (governor of Dnipropetrovsk Oblast) as prime minister, succeeding Yevhen Marchuk. The appointment of Lazarenko, a fellow member of the Dnipropetrovsk Mafia, marked the total control of the clan over Ukrainian state institutions. Prior to his appointment, Lazarenko was popular in Dnipropetrovsk Oblast for his policies (including a free public transport scheme), while also gaining notoriety for his alleged status as a crime boss who oversaw mafia activities throughout the region. As prime minister Lazarenko soon became embroiled in high-profile embezzlement scandals, and in the face of pressure from Western diplomats, the liability of Lazarenko's corruption to Kuchma's approval ratings and Lazarenko's own increasing popularity, he resigned or was dismissed in July 1997. Lazarenko unsuccessfully mounted a political campaign against Kuchma after leaving the premiership, accusing Kuchma of organising a political campaign against him, until his February 1999 arrest and conviction on embezzlement charges in the United States. Bondarenko describes Kuchma's appointment of Lazarenko as among the greatest mistakes of his presidency, while Karatnycky notes that with Lazarenko's appointment Kuchma "perhaps unknowingly" gave one of the highest state offices to a leading figure in Ukrainian organised crime.

==== Adoption of the Constitution ====
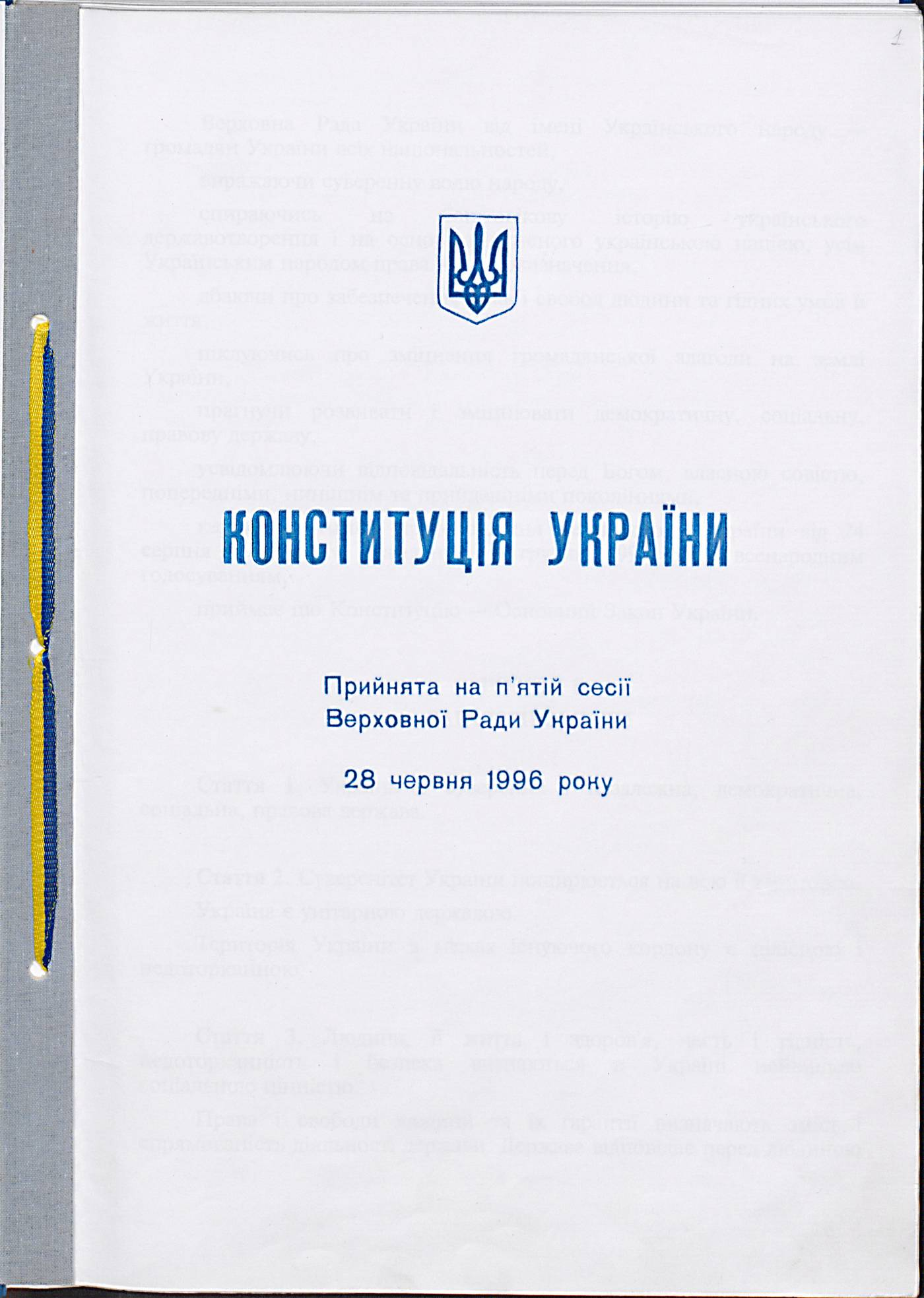
Kuchma oversaw the 1996 adoption of the Constitution of Ukraine after a conflict with the leftist-dominated Verkhovna Rada

Kuchma inherited an informal and chaotic constitutional situation based on the 1978 Constitution of the Ukrainian SSR, which, while removing explicit references to the leading role of the party and socialism, still lacked an effective separation of powers; previous attempts to write a constitution during Kravchuk's presidency failed as a result of political polarisation. During his 1994 presidential campaign Kuchma rejected the importance of writing a new constitution as of lesser importance compared to economic affairs, but he supported a strong presidential system with devolution of economic powers to the regions.

After his inauguration, Kuchma began to pursue constitutional reform with increased intensity, seeking the subordination of the remnant soviets and the regions to the Verkhovna Rada, which would itself have its powers more clearly defined in order to prevent it from "interfering with the work of the executive", according to political scientist Kataryna Wolczuk. Kuchma's supporters further argued that Ukraine possessed a history a strong head of state, citing the positions of kniaz and hetman, the Emperor of Russia and the General Secretary of the CPSU as precedents for strong presidential power. As a check on the leftist-dominated Rada, Kuchma proposed an indirectly elected senate as an upper house of the parliament, whose members would be selected from presidentially-appointed regional representatives. Wolczuk credits Kuchma's premiership (as well as, to a lesser extent, his business career) as informing his proposals for a strong executive and weak legislature. Against Kuchma, the left supported a Soviet-inspired parliamentary system based on the supremacy of a unicameral Verkhovna Rada, as well as direct democracy provided by referendums and the continued existence of the soviets. The national democrats, in contrast to both Kuchma's entourage and the left, lacked a cohesive programme, at various points alternating between support for a parliamentary system based on those of Western Europe and a presidential system like that of the US, with some on the right feeling that the latter was necessary due to the dominance of leftist and independent deputies in the Rada after the 1994 elections.

Kuchma soon became embroiled in a struggle with Oleksandr Moroz, chairman of the Verkhovna Rada and leader of the Socialist Party of Ukraine. Moroz, who had been elected to the position of chairman with Kuchma's support, proposed to limit presidential powers, a suggestion that Kuchma later recalled as leaving him incensed. To force the left into accepting his proposals, Kuchma threatened the usage of a referendum to dissolve the Rada and legalise a favourable constitution. The right, seeking to advance economic reforms and weaken the leftist parliamentary majority, backed Kuchma's proposal for greater presidential prerogatives.

In spite of the lack of legal basis for a referendum, Kuchma's popularity at the time, coupled with his control over the Central Election Commission and backing from the clans, convinced the Rada to begin negotiations over the constitution, eventually culminating in the signing of a constitutional agreement by Moroz and Kuchma on 8 June 1995, granting additional powers to the presidency. Researcher Oleh Protsyk argues that the usage of intimidation was "soon to be one of [Kuchma's] favorite tactics for conflict resolution".

Alarmed by the prospect of Gennady Zyuganov's victory in the 1996 Russian presidential election and efforts by the KPU to block the Constitution's passage until after Zyuganov won, Kuchma and the Rada alike sought with increased urgency to secure a compromise that would be able to secure a parliamentary majority. As a result, Kuchma abandoned his proposals of bicameralism and reducing the Rada's powers. The final Constitution of Ukraine was adopted on 28 June 1996 by 315 votes in favour. It established a semi-presidential system, enabling the president to appoint the prime minister and granting him control over foreign, defence and security policy. Concessions were made to both the left (with promises of expansive welfare) and the right (by defining Ukrainian as the sole state language and establishing a separation of powers).

In practice, Kuchma's presidency has been criticised for failing to engage in the development of a liberal and democratic system; Wilson notes that Ukraine continued to possess a politicised bureaucracy after the Constitution's passage and that Ukraine lacked judicial independence, and describes Kuchma's government as increasingly prone to authoritarianism and democratic backsliding. Likewise, D'Anieri criticises the Constitution as it existed under Kuchma for its strong presidential powers, and states that Kuchma would later use ambiguously legal methods to revise the Constitution in 2000, furthering a precedent of weak constitutional or legal norms.

=== Crimea policy ===
Location of Crimea within the Black Sea

Pro-Russian separatism in Crimea dated back to 1992, when the Republic of Crimea declared independence from Ukraine, a declaration that the Supreme Soviet of Russia later backed by condemning the transfer of Crimea to Ukraine and calling for negotiations over the future of the region. Kuchma won 82.6% of the vote in Crimea in the 1994 presidential election, in part due to his support for the Russian language, as well as the association of his campaign with federalism and dual citizenship.

Kuchma initially refused to involve himself in Crimean politics, particularly the matter of a dispute between separatist president Yuriy Meshkov, who sought the support of the Don Cossacks and the Russian military to integrate Crimea into Russia, and the more cautious Verkhovna Rada of Crimea. After a January 1995 declaration of the Crimean Verkhovna Rada calling for the restoration of the Soviet Union and increased diplomacy between Ukraine, Russia and Belarus, the Ukrainian government moved to destroy the separatist movement. At a 17 March 1995 speech to the Verkhovna Rada, Kuchma raised the matter of Crimea, calling on the Rada to abrogate the peninsula's 1992 constitution that provided for secession. The same day, the Rada voted 246–55 to abolish the constitution and the position of president and to prosecute Meshkov for issuing decrees that contravened Ukrainian law. Power was transferred to Anatoliy Franchuk, prime minister of Crimea and a relative of Kuchma through marriage. The Verkhovna Rada of Crimea called on the State Duma (the successor to the Supreme Soviet of Russia) to protect the rights of Crimea's Russian-speaking population, but the first Chechen War in which Russia's military was embroiled prevented a significant response. Ukrainian measures to reestablish control over Crimea were also bolstered by the support of the Crimean Tatars (particularly the Mejlis of the Crimean Tatar People, the ethnic group's chief representatives).

Kuchma also negotiated a conclusive end to the Black Sea Fleet dispute during his presidency. While the general agreement to split the Black Sea Fleet equally between Russia and Ukraine remained since 1992, Russia increasingly took issue with the matter of Sevastopol, where Russia sought "restricted access" to individuals not associated with the Russian military and the deployment of FSB Border Service troops to the city. The matter was ultimately settled by the Partition Treaty on the Status and Conditions of the Black Sea Fleet, which was signed by Lazarenko and Russian prime minister Viktor Chernomyrdin in May 1997. The treaty confirmed Sevastopol's status as a Ukrainian city, while at the same time lifting trade barriers between Ukraine and Russia and permitting the presence of the Russian Black Sea Fleet in Crimea for a period of 20–25 years. The Partition Treaty was generally celebrated in Ukraine as a victory, though academic James Sherr notes that some Ukrainian politicians feared it was renegotiating Ukrainian integration into Russia or a distraction from economic failures ahead of the 1998 and 1999 elections. The Partition Treaty was later terminated by Russia following the 2014 annexation of Crimea.

Ahead of the 1998 Ukrainian parliamentary election Kuchma refused to sign a presidential decree that would have temporarily enfranchised non-citizen Crimean Tatars to vote in the election, as had been previously done in 1994. He argued against the claims that the Crimean Tatars, who were largely citizens of Uzbekistan at the time, faced difficulties in obtaining Ukrainian citizenship, a requirement to vote under the 1996 constitution. On 18 February 1998, he signed a law enabling snap elections to the Verkhovna Rada of Crimea and abolishing the mixed electoral system in Crimea that established quotas for the non-Slavic population (including 14 seats for Crimean Tatars). This, along with the Verkhovna Rada's refusal to pass a law that would have enfranchised Crimean Tatars, triggered protests and clashes with police ahead of the elections.

=== Foreign policy ===
Kuchma and European Commission President Jacques Santer, 1995

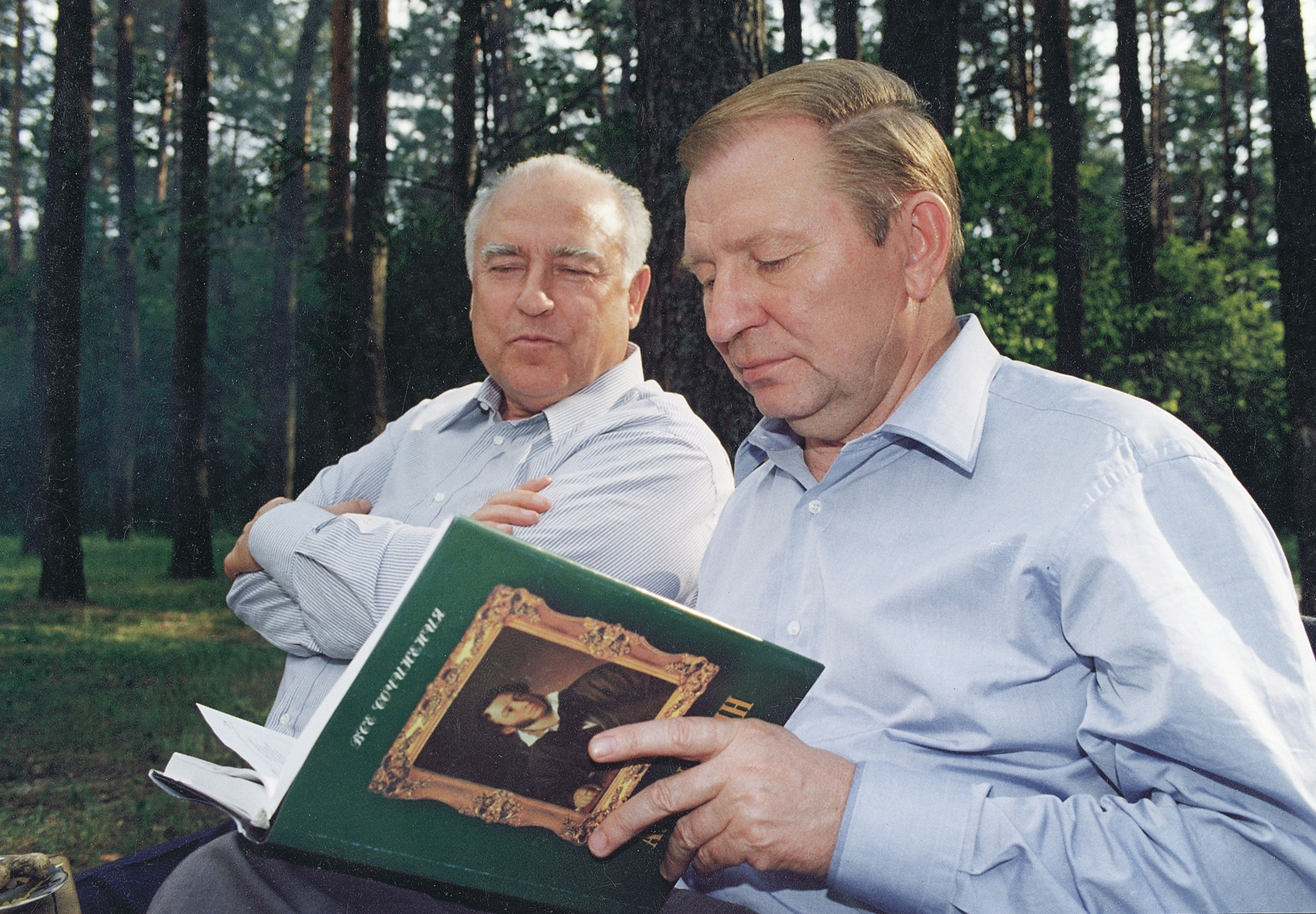
Kuchma and Russian prime minister Viktor Chernomyrdin, 1999

Kuchma was elected for his first term in 1994 on promises of improving relations with Russia. In his inaugural address, he said:

Historically, Ukraine is part of the Euro-Asian cultural and economics space. Ukraine's vitally important national interests are now concentrated on this territory of the former Soviet Union. ... We are also linked with... the former republics of the Soviet Union by traditional scientific, cultural and family ties... I am convinced that Ukraine can assume the role of one of the leaders of Euro-Asian economic integration.

Kuchma signed a Treaty of Friendship, Cooperation, and Partnership with Russia, and endorsed a round of talks with the CIS. Additionally, he referred to Russian as "an official language". Despite this, Kuchma's foreign policy wasn't characterized with any kind of reorientation toward Moscow, and under his presidency Ukraine's involvement into the CIS continued in the same limited manner, as under his predecessor. In 1994, Ukraine joined the Partnership for Peace program. The next year Ukraine also became a member of the Council of Europe. In 1996, Kuchma signed a special partnership agreement with NATO and raised the possibility of Ukraine's membership of the alliance.

== Second term as president (1999–2005) ==
=== 1999 re-election ===
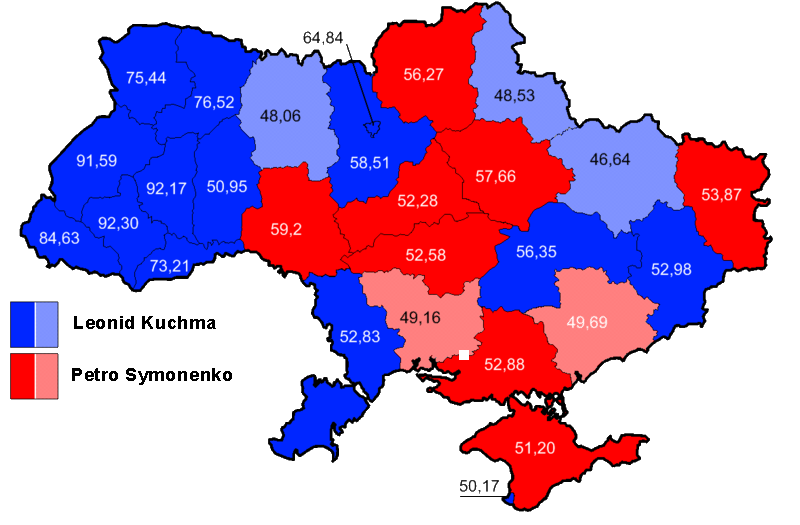
Results in the Second round of the 1999 presidential election: Blue – Leonid Kuchma, red – Petro Symonenko

Kuchma was re-elected in 1999 to his second term. His opponent in the runoff was Communist leader Petro Symonenko, whose party had significantly improved its result during the previous year's parliamentary election. This time the areas that had given Kuchma strongest support last time voted for his opponents, and the areas which had voted against him during the 1994 election came to his support. The result of the 1999 election was to a large degree decided by a split in the left-wing opposition and a strong media bias in Kuchma's favour, and was interpreted as a decisive break with Ukraine's Soviet past. According to historian Serhy Yekelchyk, President Kuchma's administration "employed electoral fraud freely" during the 1999 presidential elections and the following 2000 constitutional referendum.

=== Domestic policy ===
During its later years, Kuchma's presidential regime was described as a "blackmail state" due to his government's systematic use of blackmail in order to persecute political opponents. Kuchma's administration closed opposition papers and several journalists and political opponents, such as Viacheslav Chornovil, died in mysterious circumstances. Opponents accused him of involvement in the killing in 2000 of journalist Georgiy Gongadze, but Kuchma has consistently denied such claims. Critics have also blamed Kuchma for restrictions on press freedom. Kuchma is believed to have played a key role in sacking the Cabinet of Viktor Yushchenko by Verkhovna Rada on 26 April 2001. After his dismissal Yushchenko became the main leader of anti-Kuchma opposition.

Kuchma's Prime Minister from 2002 until early January 2005 was Viktor Yanukovych, after Kuchma dismissed Anatoliy Kinakh, his previous appointee.

=== Foreign policy ===
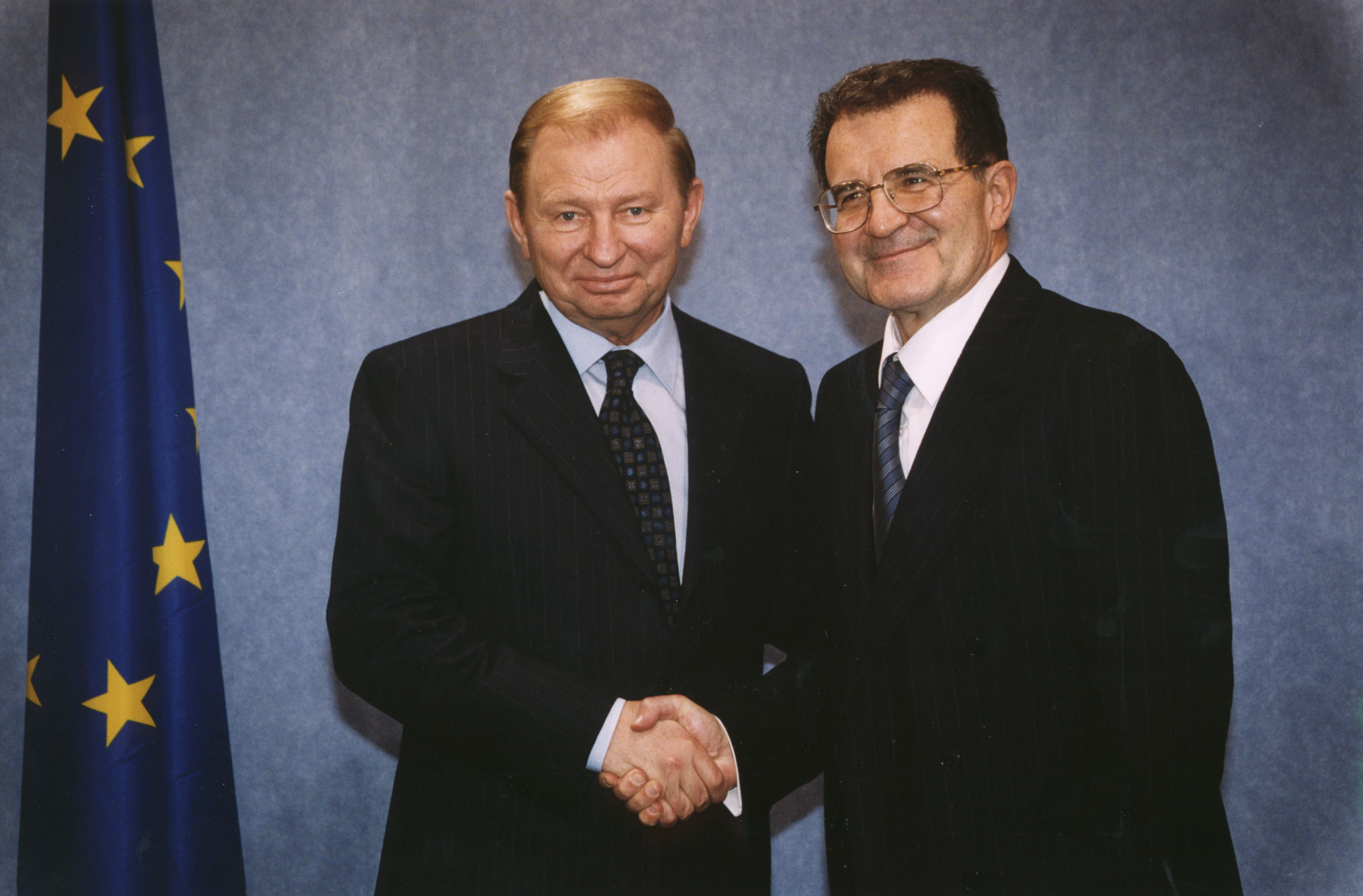
Kuchma with President of the European Commission Romano Prodi in Brussels, 5 December 1999

In 2002, Kuchma stated that Ukraine wanted to sign an association agreement with the European Union by 2003–2004 and that Ukraine would meet all EU membership requirements by 2007–2011. He also hoped for a free trade treaty with the EU.

In 2003 Ukraine agreed "in principle" to join the Eurasian Economic Space.

Under Kuchma's leadership, the Armed Forces of Ukraine participated in the Iraq War.

After Kuchma's popularity at home and abroad sank as he became mired in corruption scandals, he turned to Russia as his new ally. From the late 1990s he adopted a foreign policy which he described as "multi-vector", reaching out to Russia, Europe, and the United States. Critics assessed this policy as manipulating both the West and Russia to the personal benefit of Kuchma and Ukrainian oligarchs.

On 4 October 2001, Siberia Airlines Flight 1812 was shot down over the Black Sea by the Ukrainian Air Force while en route to Novosibirsk, Russia, from Tel Aviv, Israel. All 78 occupants of the plane, most of whom were Israelis visiting relatives in Russia, were killed. Following the shootdown, Kuchma initially refused to accept the resignation of Oleksandr Kuzmuk, Minister of Defence of Ukraine, and said, "Look what is happening around the world, in Europe. We are not the first, and we will not be the last. There is no need to make a tragedy out of this. Mistakes happen everywhere, and not only on this scale, but on a much larger, planetary scale." A week later, however, Kuchma announced his willingness to cooperate with Russian investigators, apologised to the governments of Russia and Israel, and accepted Kuzmuk's resignation.

=== Murder of Georgiy Gongadze and Cassette Scandal ===
From 1998 to 2000, Kuchma's bodyguard Mykola Melnychenko was allegedly eavesdropping Kuchma's office, later publishing the recordings. The release of the tapes – dubbed the Cassette Scandal – supposedly revealed Kuchma's numerous crimes, in particular approving the sale of radar systems to Saddam Hussein among other illegal arms sales and ordering the death of journalist Georgiy Gongadze.

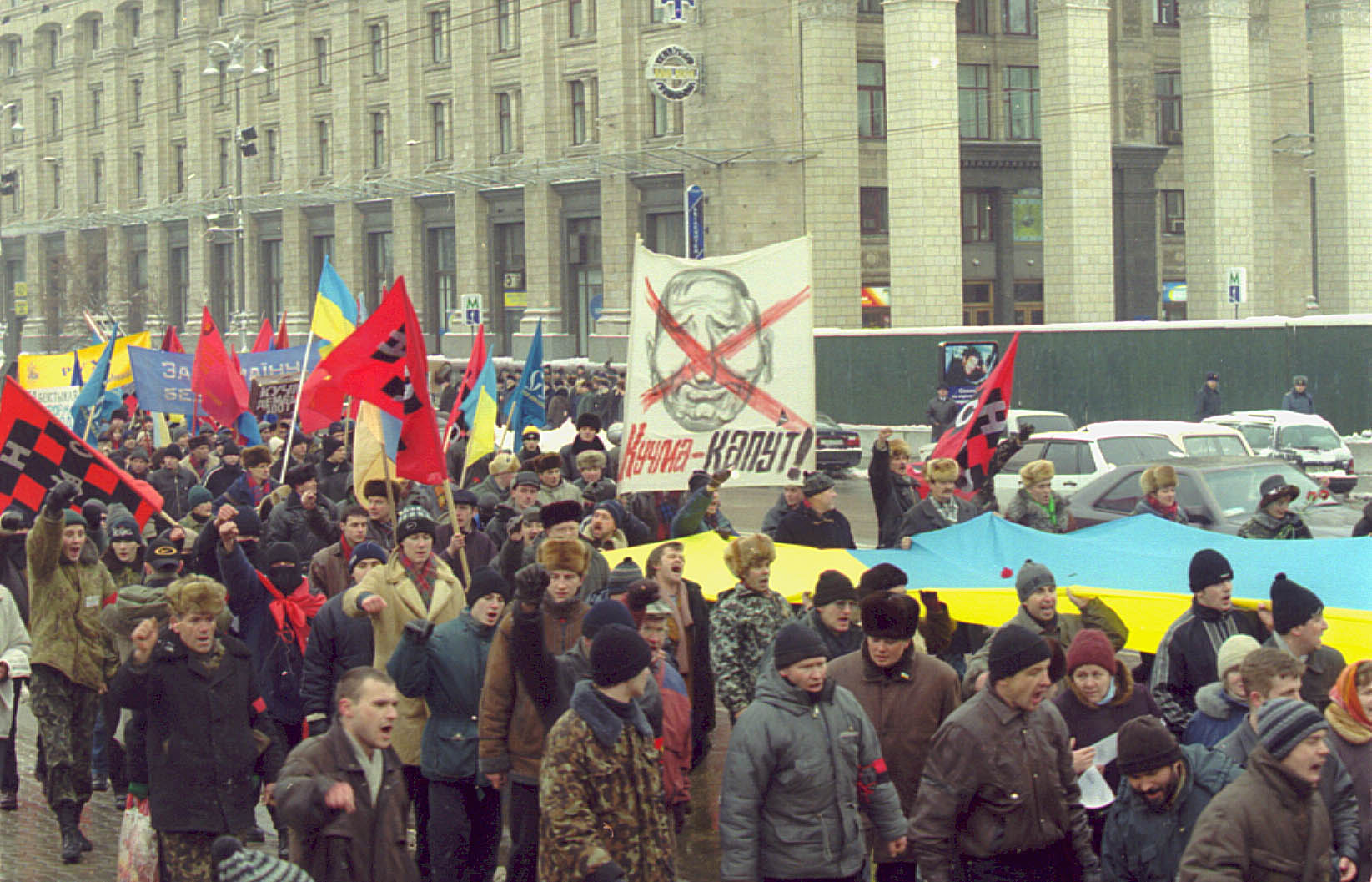
Ukraine without Kuchma protests, 6 February 2001

In September 2000, Gongadze disappeared and his headless corpse was found mutilated on 3 November 2000. On 28 November, opposition politician Oleksandr Moroz publicised the tape recordings implicating Kuchma in Gongadze's murder. In 2005, the Ukrainian Prosecutor General's office instigated criminal proceedings against Kuchma and members of his former administration in connection with the murder of Gongadze. In 2005, the press reported that Kuchma had been unofficially granted immunity from prosecution in return for his graceful departure from office.

Critics of the tapes point to the difficulty of Melnychenko recording 500 hours of dictaphone tape unaided and undetected, the lack of material evidence of said recording equipment, and other doubts which question the authenticity and motive of the release of the tape. Kuchma acknowledged in 2003 that his voice was one of those on the tapes, but claimed the tapes had been selectively edited to distort their meaning.

However, according to the United States ambassador to Ukraine, Carlos Pascual, that the tapes are genuine, undistorted, unaltered, and not manipulated. His statement was based on the conclusion made by FBI Electronic Research Facility's analysis of the original recording device and the original recording, which found no unusual sounds which would indicate tampering of the recording, detected no breaks in its continuity and no traces of manipulation in the digital files.

The Prosecutor General of Ukraine's Office cancelled its resolution to deny opening of criminal cases against Kuchma and other politicians within the Gongadze-case on 9 October 2010. On 22 March 2011, Ukraine opened an official investigation into the murder of Gongadze and, two days later, Ukrainian prosecutors charged Kuchma with involvement in the murder. A Ukrainian district court ordered prosecutors to drop criminal charges against Kuchma on 14 December 2011 on grounds that evidence linking him to the murder of Gongadze was insufficient. The court rejected Melnychenko's recordings as evidence. Gongadze's widow, Myroslava Gongadze, lodged an appeal against the ruling one week later.

During the trial of Oleksiy Pukach for the murder of Gongadze, he claimed that Kuchma and Kuchma's head of his Presidential Administration, Volodymyr Lytvyn, were the ones who ordered the murder. Pukach was convicted and sentenced to life imprisonment for his part in the murder of Gongadze.

First Deputy Prosecutor General of Ukraine Renat Kuzmin claimed 20 February 2013 that his office had collected enough evidence confirming Kuchma's responsibility for ordering Gongadze's assassination. Kuchma's reply the next day was, "This is another banal example of a provocation, which I've heard more than enough in the past 12 years".

=== 2004 Ukrainian presidential election and Orange Revolution ===
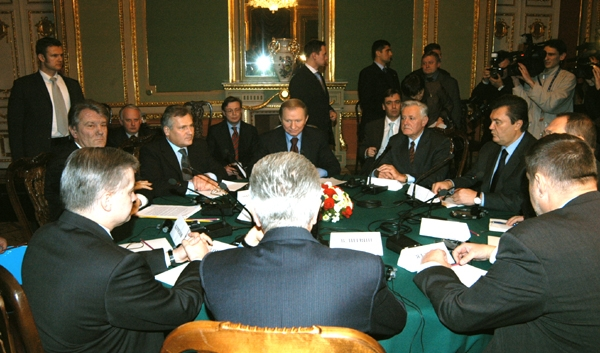
Kuchma (seated in the middle) participating in the "round table" talks between Yushchenko, Yanukovych and international representatives during the Orange Revolution, 1 December 2004

Kuchma's role in the 2004 Ukrainian presidential election and subsequent Orange Revolution is not entirely clear. In the run-up to the elections, oligarchs opposed to Leonid Kuchma contributed about $150 million to opposition political parties. According to Michael McFaul, U.S. ambassador to Russia from 2012 to 2014 and architect of Barack Obama's policy in the region, the U.S. government spent more than $18 million on "democracy promotion" in the two years leading up to the election. Kuchma, who had been cleared by the Constitutional Court to run for a third term, eventually refused to take part in the elections and endorsed the candidacy of Viktor Yanukovych, who was also supported by Russian president Vladimir Putin. After the second round on 22 November 2004, it appeared that Yanukovych had won the election by fraud, which caused the opposition and independent observers to dispute the results, leading to the Orange Revolution.

Kuchma was urged by Yanukovych and Viktor Medvedchuk (the head of the presidential office) to declare a state of emergency and hold the inauguration of Yanukovych. He denied the request. Later, Yanukovych publicly accused Kuchma of a betrayal. Kuchma refused to officially dismiss Prime Minister Yanukovych after the parliament passed a motion of no confidence against the Cabinet on 1 December 2004. Soon after, Kuchma left the country. He returned to Ukraine in March 2005.

In September 2011, Kuchma stated that he believed that Yanukovych was the real winner of the 2004 election.

== Post-presidency ==
Kuchma has been active in politics since his presidency ended. He aligned himself with President Viktor Yushchenko in 2005, but later raised concerns about the president in correspondence with John F. Tefft, then United States Ambassador to Ukraine. Kuchma said in October 2009 that he would vote for Victor Yanukovych in the 2010 Ukrainian presidential election and endorsed him during the presidential campaign. In a document dated 2 February 2010 and uncovered during the United States diplomatic cables leak, Kuchma, in a conversation with Tefft, called the voters' choice between Yanukovych and Yulia Tymoshenko during the second round of the 2010 presidential election as a choice between "bad and very bad" and praised (the candidate eliminated in the first round of the election) Arseniy Yatsenyuk instead.

=== Involvement in the 2014 pro-Russian conflict in Ukraine ===
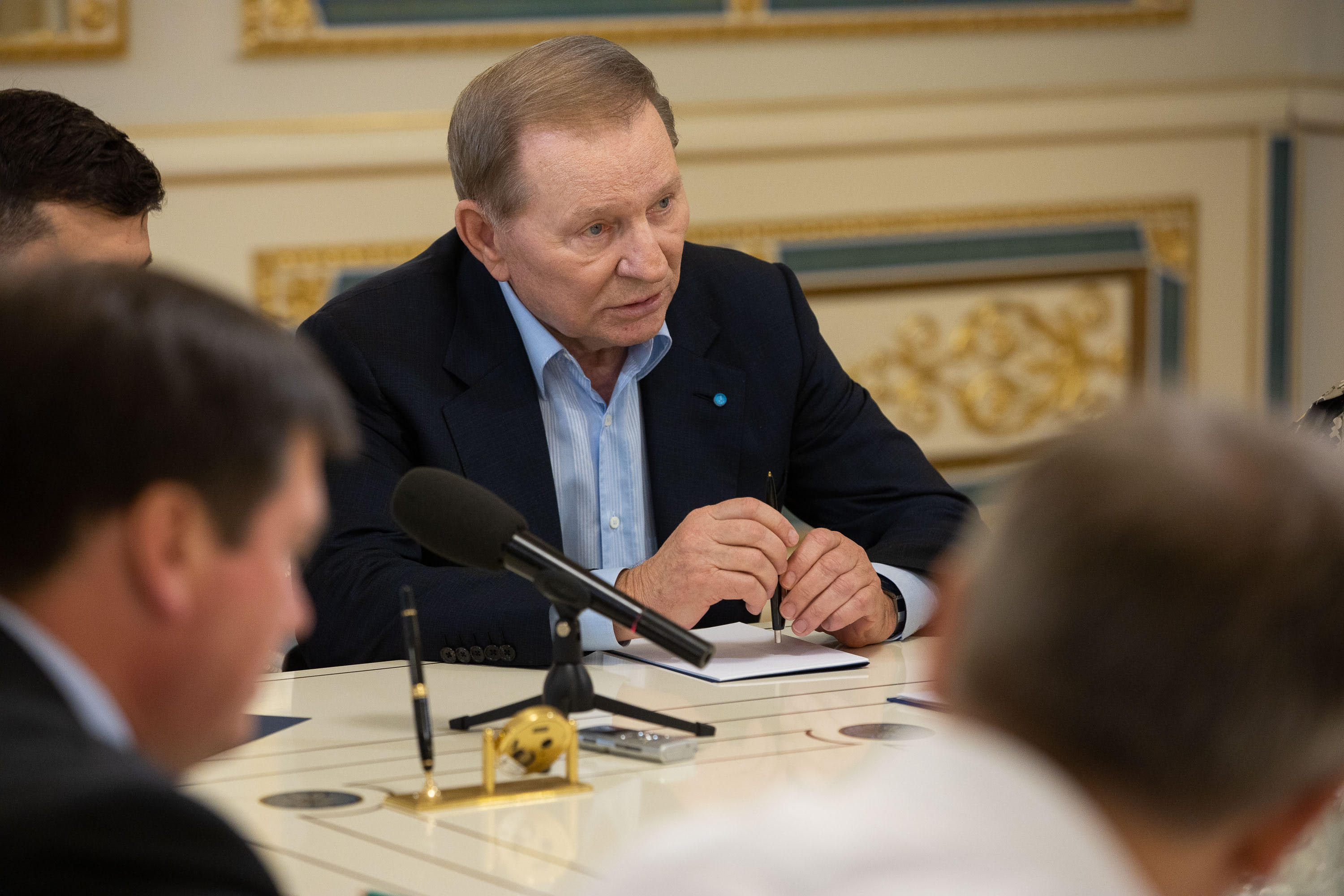
Kuchma meeting with president Volodymyr Zelensky as a member of the Ukrainian delegation in talks related to the Donbas War in 2019

Kuchma represented Ukraine at negotiations with the armed separatists in the Donetsk and Luhansk provinces on 21 June 2014 to discuss President Petro Poroshenko's peace plan. His role as a diplomat was received positively by the west and Russia as well as by the public in Ukraine.

On 11 February 2015, Kuchma was one of the signatories of a draft plan to end the conflict in Donbas. The summit was known as Minsk II. The plan ensured that a ceasefire was implemented; reaction from leaders in Europe was generally positive.

In March 2015, Kuchma delivered an address calling on the west for greater involvement in the region. He criticized the action of Russian-backed forces in the attempt to seize the town of Debaltseve.

In September 2015, Kuchma was again appointed as the representative for Ukraine at the Trilateral Contact Group. The group met in Belarus to discuss ending the conflict in Donbas. In early 2017, Kuchma spoke out against the transport blockade of Donbas. In March 2017 at the Trilateral Contact Group (TCG) in Minsk, he demanded that the Russian Federation repeal their decree on the recognition of passports issued in separatist-held areas.

On 2 October 2018, Kuchma stepped down as Ukraine's representative in the Trilateral Contact Group due to his age. He returned to the talks in June 2019, at the request of newly elected Ukrainian president Volodymyr Zelenskyy and after mediation by Victor Pinchuk. According to American sources, he left the post again in July 2020, citing fatigue. He was replaced by Leonid Kravchuk.

=== Russian invasion of Ukraine ===
When Russia began its invasion of Ukraine in 2022, Kuchma said that he would remain to help defend the country: "I stay at home, in Ukraine, because we are all in our Homeland, there is no other. And we will defend it together until the very victory – without division into party columns, without personal interests and old arguments. United we stand around the Flag, the Army, and the President. Ukraine is not Russia. And it will never become Russia. No matter how hard they want this. We are already winning. And this can’t be stopped. And I will only say to the Russian Federation that I agree with the words of my compatriots who say in one voice: damn you all!".

In November 2023, Kuchma presented his new book Ukraine is Not Russia: Twenty Years Later.

== Family and personal life ==
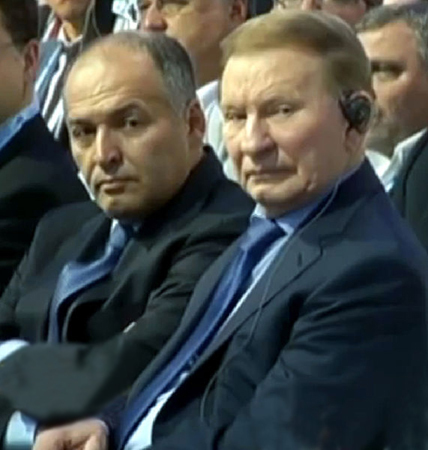
Kuchma with his son-in-law Viktor Pinchuk in 2014

Kuchma has been married to Lyudmyla Talalayeva since 1967. is the Honorary President of the National Fund of Social Protection of Mothers and Children, "Ukraine to Children" and is also known as a paralympic movement in Ukraine supporter.

Kuchma's only child, daughter Olena Pinchuk, is married to Viktor Pinchuk, an industrialist and philanthropist whose Victor Pinchuk Foundation regularly hosts Ukraine-dedicated and philanthropic forums at the annual World Economic Forum in Davos. Victor Pinchuk made headlines when it was revealed that one of his lobbyists was previously picked by Donald Trump for national security aide.

Kuchma was an amateur guitar player in his younger years. He was also known for his skill at the complicated card game preferans.

In 2003, he published his book, Ukraine is Not Russia.

After retirement, Kuchma was allowed to keep the state-owned dacha in Koncha-Zaspa for his personal use upon completion of his state duties. Government order #15-r, which allowed Kuchma to keep his estate, was signed by acting Prime Minister Mykola Azarov on 19 January 2005. Kuchma was also allowed to keep his full presidential salary and all service personnel, along with two state-owned vehicles. That order also stated that these costs would be paid out of the state budget.

== Legacy ==
Kuchma's legacy as President of Ukraine has proven divisive and controversial. He has been commonly referred to as authoritarian, and his attacks on independent media, as well as his economic reforms, have continued to impact Ukraine in the years since he left office.

=== Ideology ===
Political advisor Dmytro Vydrin and first head of Kuchma's presidential administration Dmytro Tabachnyk claimed Kuchma to be a representative of centrist forces supported by Ukraine's industrial establishment, and denied his allegiance to any particular ideology. According to them, during his presidency Kuchma combined his functions as a political leader with those of a manager, seeing Ukraine as a stabilizing force on the post-Soviet space and as an equal participant in the global market. Kuchma himself didn't deny Ukraine's need for a national idea, but refused to see it in exclusively ethnonationalist terms. According to Taras Kuzio, Kuchma's refusal to sacrifice Ukraine's nation- and state-building despite his policies of normalizing relations with Russia, proved that the allegiance of his Russophone voters to the idea of an independent Ukrainian state was not weaker than that of Ukrainophone Ukrainians.

=== Economic and political legacy ===
Kuchma's detractors have accused him of establishing the Ukrainian oligarchs with his economic reforms, and many oligarchs entered politics during his presidency, among them Kuchma's son-in-law Viktor Pinchuk, Viktor Medvedchuk, Ihor Bakai, Kostyantyn Zhevago and Heorhiy Kirpa.

Kuchma's political legacy has also been impactful. Each of his successors except Volodymyr Zelenskyy began their political career under and with the support of Kuchma. Several other politicians, such as Medvedchuk, Volodymyr Lytvyn, Leonid Derkach, Volodymyr Horbulin, and Oleksandr Omelchenko also were promoted by Kuchma during his tenure in office.

=== Criminal persecution ===
Despite numerous human rights abuses during his tenure, such as vote rigging in the 2004 presidential election, and the mysterious deaths of numerous political opponents, among them Gongadze and Viacheslav Chornovil, Kuchma has never been charged with a crime, and numerous attempts to do so have proven unsuccessful.

== Awards ==
Arms of Leonid Kuchma as knight of the Order of Civil Merit (Spain)

Ukrainian honours

- Order of the Ukrainian Orthodox Church (Moscow Patriarchate) of St. Ilya of Murom, 1st class (2004)
- Honorary Citizen of the Donetsk Oblast (2002)

Foreign honours

- Knight Grand Cross with Grand Cordon of the Order of Merit of the Italian Republic (3 May 1995)
- Knight Collar of the Order of Civil Merit (4 October 1996)
- Istiglal Order (6 August 1999)
- Order of Merit for the Fatherland, 1st class (Russia, 20 April 2004) – for his contribution to strengthening friendship and cooperation between Russia and Ukraine
- Grand Cross of the Order of Vytautas the Great (Lithuania, 20 September 1996)
- Grand Cross of the Order of the Lithuanian Grand Duke Gediminas (Lithuania, 4 November 1998, Ludmila too)
- Order of the Golden Eagle (Kazakhstan, 1999)
- Grand Cross with Chain of the Order of the Star of Romania (Romania, 2000)
- Order of the Republic (Moldova, 2003)
- Order of the White Eagle (Poland, 1997; renounced in 2026, see Polish Order of the White Eagle controversy)
- Order Laila Utama Dardzha Kerabat, 1st class (Brunei, 2004)
- Chain of the Order of Prince Henry (Portugal, 16 April 1998) 3 February 1999
- Order of the "Star of Bethlehem" (State of Palestine, 2000)

== Notes ==
Political offices
Preceded by Valentyn Symonenko	Prime Minister of Ukraine; 1992–1993	Succeeded by Yukhym Zvyahilsky; Acting
Preceded by Leonid Kravchuk	President of Ukraine; 1994–2005	Succeeded by Viktor Yushchenko
