= Multi-Vector Policy =

Foreign policy doctrine

The Multi-Vector Policy or Multi-Vector Doctrine (Russian: многовекторность, romanized: mnogovektornost) is a foreign policy doctrine that seeks to maintain balanced and cooperative relations with multiple global powers rather than aligning exclusively with one geopolitical bloc. This strategy was adopted by the countries of Kazakhstan and Ukraine seeking to preserve sovereignty, enhance economic opportunities, and navigate complex international dynamics. By engaging with diverse political and economic partners—including major powers such as Russia, the United States, China, and the European Union—this policy aims to maximize strategic flexibility, mitigate external pressures, and secure national interests. While proponents argue that it fosters stability and economic diversification, critics contend that it can lead to inconsistencies in long-term policy direction and hinder deeper integration with specific alliances.

== Background ==
The concept of a Multi-Vector Policy in foreign relations was first articulated by Kazakh President Nursultan Nazarbayev in May 1992, following the dissolution of the Soviet Union. In his policy article titled Strategy for the Formation and Development of Kazakhstan as a Sovereign State, Nazarbayev emphasized the importance of maintaining balanced relations with major global powers to ensure national security and economic development.

A similar approach was later adopted in Ukraine under President Leonid Kuchma, who, during the 1994 Ukrainian presidential election, positioned himself as a pro-Russian candidate. This policy followed the Pavlychko Doctrine of President Leonid Kravchuk and Dmytro Pavlychko, which advocated for Ukraine to remain a neutral, non-aligned, and non-nuclear state. While the doctrine was later criticized in Ukraine for its perceived naivety, it aligned with the broader political climate of the 1990s, when demilitarization and denuclearization were widely supported, particularly in the aftermath of the 1986 Chernobyl disaster.

== Kazakhstan ==
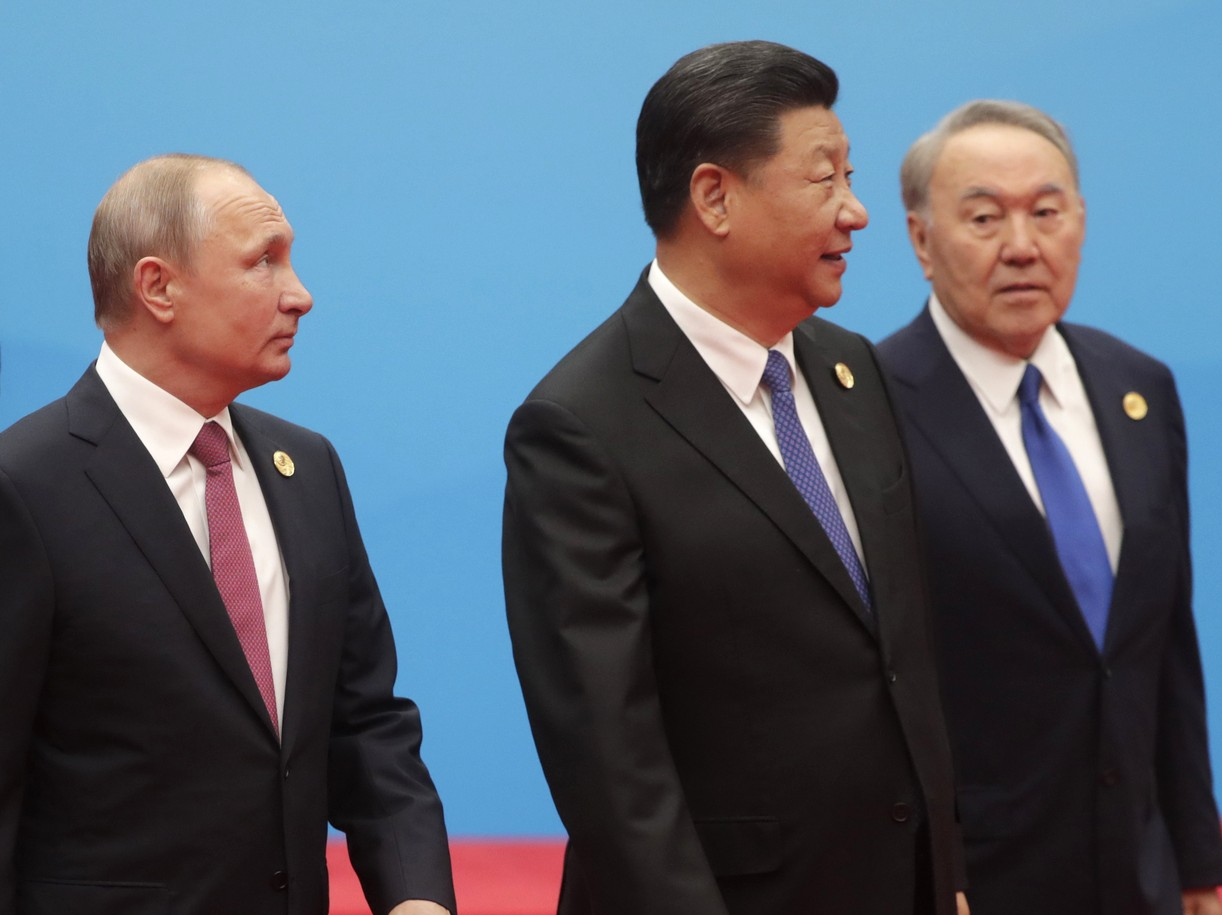
Russian president Vladimir Putin, Chinese leader Xi Jinping and Kazakhstan president Nursultan Nazarbayev during a Shanghai Cooperation Organisation summit

Kazakhstan's Multi-Vector Policy, introduced in 1992 by President Nursultan Nazarbayev, sought to balance political and economic integration with former Soviet republics while avoiding Russia’s dominance in the region. This strategy aimed to secure Kazakhstan’s security and foster economic development by cultivating diverse relationships with global powers, including Russia, China, and the United States. Under Nazarbayev, Kazakhstan integrated within the Commonwealth of Independent States (CIS) while also expanding diplomatic ties beyond the former Soviet space. His approach, characterized by "opportunistic multi-alignment," allowed Kazakhstan to engage with both regional and extra-regional powers and multilateral organizations, thus enhancing its security and economic position. Nazarbayev’s policy led to regional integration efforts like the Central Asian Economic Community (CAEC) and the Eurasian Economic Community (EurAsEC), while also strengthening ties with the West and China. Furthermore, Kazakhstan participated in multilateral initiatives such as the Shanghai Cooperation Organization (SCO) and the Cooperation Council of Turkic-Speaking States (CCTSS), securing its legitimacy and diplomatic room for maneuver despite Russia’s military presence in the region.

After Nazarbayev's resignation in 2019, his successor, President Kassym-Jomart Tokayev, upheld the Multi-Vector Policy, reaffirming Kazakhstan's commitment to diversifying its foreign relations. Tokayev maintained strong ties with Russia while also working to strengthen connections with the European Union, China, and other global powers. Under Tokayev’s foreign policy, Kazakhstan has continued to balance its strategic interests amid shifting geopolitical dynamics, including the challenges posed during the Russian invasion of Ukraine. The country has worked to maintain its neutrality while navigating pressures from Russia and the West, aiming to preserve its multi-vector foreign policy approach in the context of these global developments.

== Ukraine ==
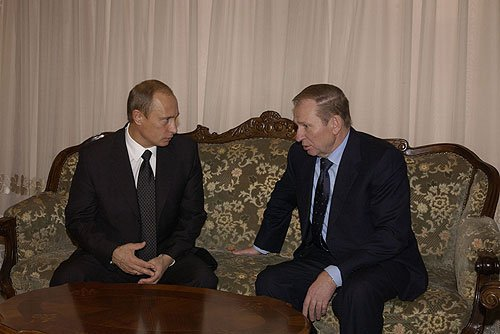
Ukrainian President Leonid Kuchma (right) with Russian President Vladimir Putin, 2003. The Multi-Vector Policy supported improved relations between Ukraine and Russia

Under President Leonid Kuchma, Ukraine adopted the Multi-Vector Policy, aiming to balance relations with both Western and Eastern powers. This shift from a pro-Russian stance to a non-aligned position was unexpected but helped improve Ukraine's foreign relations. In 1996, the Gore-Kuchma Commission was formed to strengthen ties with the United States, and in 1997, Kuchma negotiated an agreement with Russia over Crimea, which recognized Ukraine's territorial integrity in exchange for Russian naval basing rights.

The Multi-Vector Policy became a key part of Kuchma's foreign policy, and after the Orange Revolution, some Ukrainian leaders continued to pursue similar approaches, though with more emphasis on Europe. This policy was later compared to President Viktor Yanukovych's "balanced policy," with some suggesting Kuchma was more successful at balancing relations with both Russia and the West.

=== Cassette Scandal ===
After Kuchma's re-election in 1999, he proclaimed that Ukraine would pursue a course of integration with the European Union, and the term "Multi-Vector Policy" was formally retired by the Ministry of Foreign Affairs in the summer of 2001. Despite this, Kuchma's second term would be marked by Ukraine moving closer to Russia and distancing itself from the West. This change primarily began after the 2000 Cassette Scandal, in which alleged recordings of Kuchma were revealed which purportedly indicated him ordering the killing of journalist Georgiy Gongadze and authorising the sale of the Kolchuga passive sensor to Ba'athist Iraq.

== Controversy ==
The Multi-Vector Policy has also been controversial, with opponents such as historian and politician Petro Kuzyk arguing that it increased Ukraine's reliance on Russia and being used as justification to stall efforts to accede to the European Union. Leaders of the Orange Revolution such as Viktor Yushchenko also sought to shift away from the Multi-Vector Policy towards a pro-Western policy that retained ties with Russia. These claims have been countered by supporters of the Multi-Vector Policy such as Serhiy Tihipko, who have argued that the Multi-Vector Policy is pragmatic and improves Ukraine's economic development.

The 2022 unrest in Kazakhstan, followed by the deployment of Russian-led CSTO troops, raised concerns that Kazakhstan was shifting away from its Multi-Vector Policy. Critics, including Jennifer Brick Murtazashvili, argue that Kazakhstan’s decision to accept CSTO intervention marked a departure from its historically balanced multi-vector foreign policy, signaling a growing alignment with Russia and undermining its long-standing neutrality in navigating competing global powers.
