= 2000 Ukrainian constitutional referendum =

A four-part constitutional referendum was held in Ukraine on 16 April 2000. The referendum was called by President Leonid Kuchma, and asked voters whether they approved of four amendments to the constitution that would increase the powers of the President and introduce an upper chamber.

Although all four were approved by wide margins, the changes were never implemented by the Verkhovna Rada on the basis that the referendum was unconstitutional, as it had not passed the proposals before they went to a referendum. The Venice Commission that reviewed the case confirmed the questionable nature of the referendum that should be reviewed by the Constitutional Court of Ukraine.

As of 2025, this was the most recent referendum in Ukraine.

== Questions ==
1. Do you support the proposal to complete Article 90 of the Constitution of Ukraine with a new third part with the following content: "The President of Ukraine can suspend the powers of the Verkhovna Rada of Ukraine, if the Verkhovna Rada of Ukraine fails to form a stable and operational majority in one month, or if it fails to adopt the state budget of Ukraine prepared and submitted in due form by the Cabinet of Ministers of Ukraine in three months." That could be considered as an additional reason for the dissolution of the Verkhovna Rada of Ukraine by the President of Ukraine with a corresponding amendment to paragraph 8 part one of Article 106 of the Constitution of Ukraine: "and other cases as established in the constitution of Ukraine"?
2. Do you agree with the necessity to limit the immunity of the People's Deputies of Ukraine and to delete paragraph three of Article 80 of the Constitution of Ukraine which reads: "People's Deputies of Ukraine cannot be held criminally liable, detained or arrested without the consent of the Verkhovna Rada"?
3. Would you agree to reduce the number of People's Deputies of Ukraine from 450 to 300 and to replace, in this context, in the first part of Article 76 the words "four hundred and fifty" by "three hundred", and to make corresponding changes in the legislation on elections?
4. Do you agree that it is necessary to create a two-chamber parliament where one of the chambers would represent interests of the Ukrainian regions, and to introduce the corresponding changes to the Constitution of Ukraine and legislation on elections?

== Conduct ==
According to historian Serhy Yekelchyk President Kuchma's administration "employed electoral fraud freely" during the referendum.

== Results ==
Question	For		Against		Invalid/ blank	Total votes	Registered voters	Turnout (%)	Result
Question	Votes	%	Votes	%	Invalid/ blank	Total votes	Registered voters	Turnout (%)	Result
Additional circumstances under which the president can suspend parliament	25,177,984	85.92	4,126,394	14.08	393,669	29,698,047	36,629,926	81.08	Approved
Introducing limitations on parliamentary immunity	26,461,382	90.24	2,862,560	9.76	370,763	29,694,705	36,629,926	81.07	Approved
Reducing the number of members of parliament from 450 to 300	26,730,432	91.14	2,597,915	8.86	366,514	29,694,861	36,629,926	81.07	Approved
Making the parliament bicameral	24,284,220	82.94	4,994,336	17.06	416,824	29,695,380	36,629,926	81.07	Approved
Source: Nohlen & Stöver

== See also ==
- Ukraine without Kuchma - a protest campaign partially provoked by the unpopular referendum
