= United States v. Lazarenko =

2004 United States money laundering trial for a former Ukrainian Prime Minister

- Court: United States District Court for the Northern District of California
- Full case name: United States of America vs. Pavel Ivanovich Lazarenko
- Started: 2000
- Decided: June 3, 2004
- Citation: 476 F.3d 642

Court membership
- Judge sitting: Martin Jenkins

United States v. Lazarenko, 476 F.3d 642, was a landmark decision of the United States District Court for the Northern District of California in which it was ruled that former Prime Minister of Ukraine Pavlo Lazarenko had committed money laundering, wire fraud, and interstate transportation of stolen property by using American banks, along with banks in several other countries, to illegally launder money plundered from Ukrainian businesses and the government during his tenure as Governor of Dnipropetrovsk Oblast and later as Prime Minister of Ukraine. One of the largest money laundering trials in American history, it was notably the first case in which a foreign head of state or government had been convicted in the United States for money laundering and the second case in which a foreign head of state or government had been convicted of a crime in the United States, following United States v. Noriega. The case was closely followed in Ukraine, with widespread support for Lazarenko's conviction.

== Background ==
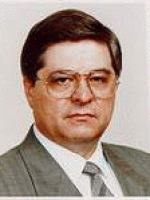
Pavlo Lazarenko in 1998

Pavlo Lazarenko served as Governor of Dnipropetrovsk Oblast from 1992 to 1994, shortly following the 1989–1991 Ukrainian revolution and the dissolution of the Soviet Union. During that period, he became closely connected to the Dnipropetrovsk Mafia of high-ranking politicians, business oligarchs, and organised crime, led by Leonid Kuchma. Lazarenko also sought to personally enrich himself, preventing any business from functioning unless half of all revenue was handed over to him. Lazarenko's organised crime connections allowed him to serve as the effective leader of the Ukrainian mafia in the region, and he had a reputation as a strict, but fair leader.

When Kuchma was elected as President of Ukraine in 1994, Lazarenko, along with other members of the Dnipropetrovsk Mafia, became part of Kuchma's official entourage, with Lazarenko becoming Minister of Energy in the new government. He would eventually become Prime Minister of Ukraine in May 1996 after being personally appointed by Kuchma. During this period, he continued to use his position for personal enrichment, illegally acquiring natural gas through bartering and transferring stolen funds to banks in Antigua and Barbuda, Hungary, the Netherlands, Poland, Switzerland, and the United States, among several other countries.

As the extent of Lazarenko's corruption was unveiled, Kuchma was forced to dismiss him as Prime Minister. Lazarenko responded by mounting an effort to challenge Kuchma, which led to a bitter conflict between pro-Lazarenko oligarchs and Kuchma's government. Kuchma was ultimately successful, and Lazarenko fled abroad, eventually entering Switzerland through unclear means. There, he was arrested on charges of using a falsified Panamanian passport, and the Verkhovna Rada subsequently stripped him of his immunity and opened criminal proceedings against him. Lazarenko fled Switzerland a day later for the United States, where he was again arrested in relation to his falsified passport. He attempted to claim asylum, but was refused, and the United States government announced charges against him in May 2000.

== First trial ==
Lazarenko's trial began in mid-March 2004 at the United States District Court for the Northern District of California. Assertions by the prosecution against Lazarenko were backed up by Petro Kirichenko, who pled guilty and revealed information about Lazarenko's activities in return for a lighter sentence, and Andre Walkowicz, a banker at Credit Suisse who had been involved in transfers of money by Lazarenko to offshore accounts.

Lazarenko was found guilty on 29 counts of money laundering, wire fraud, and interstate transportation of stolen property on June 3, 2004, and sentenced to nine years' imprisonment on August 25, 2006. He subsequently appealed to the United States Court of Appeals for the Ninth Circuit.

== Appeal to the Ninth Circuit Court of Appeals ==
Lazarenko's appeal to the Ninth Circuit Court of Appeals began on June 9, 2008, with Lazarenko filing a Rule 29 motion. The Ninth Circuit Court noted the trial's size, saying that "the scope of the indictment was massive and the trial testimony voluminous." Ultimately, it ruled that 15 of the counts be discarded, particularly charges relating to United Energy Systems of Ukraine. Other charges relating to Lazarenko's business relationship with Kirichenko were also dismissed. Lazarenko has since made several appeals going as high as the Supreme Court of the United States, though none of his appeals have been successful. He has argued that there is no demonstrable link between the funds currently held by the United States government and any ill-gotten gains he acquired during his political career.

== Later trials ==
Lazarenko was released from prison in November 2012 and held for a short time at a U.S. Immigration and Customs Enforcement detention center before being released. Another trial began relating to Lazarenko's offshore assets, which is still ongoing as of 2018, making it the longest asset forfeiture trial in United States history. It is additionally the largest and most complex asset forfeiture trial in United States history, according to one of Lazarenko's lawyers in 2016. It is still ongoing as of 2019.

== In Ukraine ==
Lazarenko's trials have been closely followed in Ukraine, where he is extremely unpopular. Anti-corruption campaigners in Ukraine have called for his extradition, with one activist saying, "I'd be disappointed if the United States granted him asylum." The Anti-Corruption Action Center, based in Kyiv, has also pursued a legal battle against Lazarenko in an effort to return the stolen funds to Ukraine. The connection between Lazarenko's trial and criminal cases against Yulia Tymoshenko since 2010 has also been noted in Ukrainian media, although Tymoshenko's UESU have been cleared of any relation to Lazarenko in the United States.
