= Red directors =

Russian term

Red directors (Russian: Красные директора) is a term in Soviet, post-Soviet and in Russian economics and politics, currently designating people from the Soviet industrial and managerial elite, directors of enterprises who took leading positions in the Soviet era and remained in them after the transition of Russia and the CIS countries to a market economy. In this sense, the term came into circulation at the suggestion of Nezavisimaya Gazeta and Kommersant in the early 1990s.

Red directors had informal connections, large team management skills and had a bright understanding of industrial technologies. Thanks to that, often an alliance between a large investor and an old red director emerged. According to Anatoly Chubais, red directors were the most influential force of Russia in the first half of the 1990s, when they got rapidly enriched; however, they also became the object of criminal encroachments of criminal groups seeking to seize enterprises with export potential.
